= St Matthew's Church, Leicester =

St Matthew’s Church, Leicester
- St Matthew’s Church, Leicester
- 52°38′30.9″N 1°7′23.6″W
- OS grid reference: SK 59424 05266
- Location: Leicester
- Country: England
- Denomination: Church of England

History
- Status: Demolished
- Dedication: St Matthew
- Consecrated: 1 May 1867

Architecture
- Architect: George Gilbert Scott
- Groundbreaking: 4 October 1865
- Completed: 1867
- Demolished: 1988

Specifications
- Capacity: 1,000 persons

Administration
- Diocese: Until 1926 Peterborough; From 1926 Leicester

St Matthew's Church, Leicester was a Church of England church on Montreal Road, Leicester from 1867 to 1988.

== History ==
The foundation stone of St Matthew's Church was laid on 4 October 1865 by William Perry-Herrick Esq of Beaumanor Hall.

This church was designed by Sir George Gilbert Scott in the thirteenth century style. It was constructed with granite from Mountsorrel with brick and freestone window surrounds and buttresses. It was a hall church with nave, aisles, chancel and tall lancets. A tower was planned but never completed. The aisles were divided from the nave by arcades of six arches on each side, supported alternately by cylindrical stone columns, and clustered columns composed of brick, surrounded by stone shafts. The roof was of stained deal, with the plaster between the beams stencilled from designs by the architect. Gas lighting was provided by Skidmore's works at Coventry, and the heating by Haden of Trowbridge.

The church was consecrated on 1 May 1867 by the Bishop of Peterborough, Rt. Revd. Francis Jeune.

The church was demolished in 1988 to make way for new housing.

== Incumbents ==
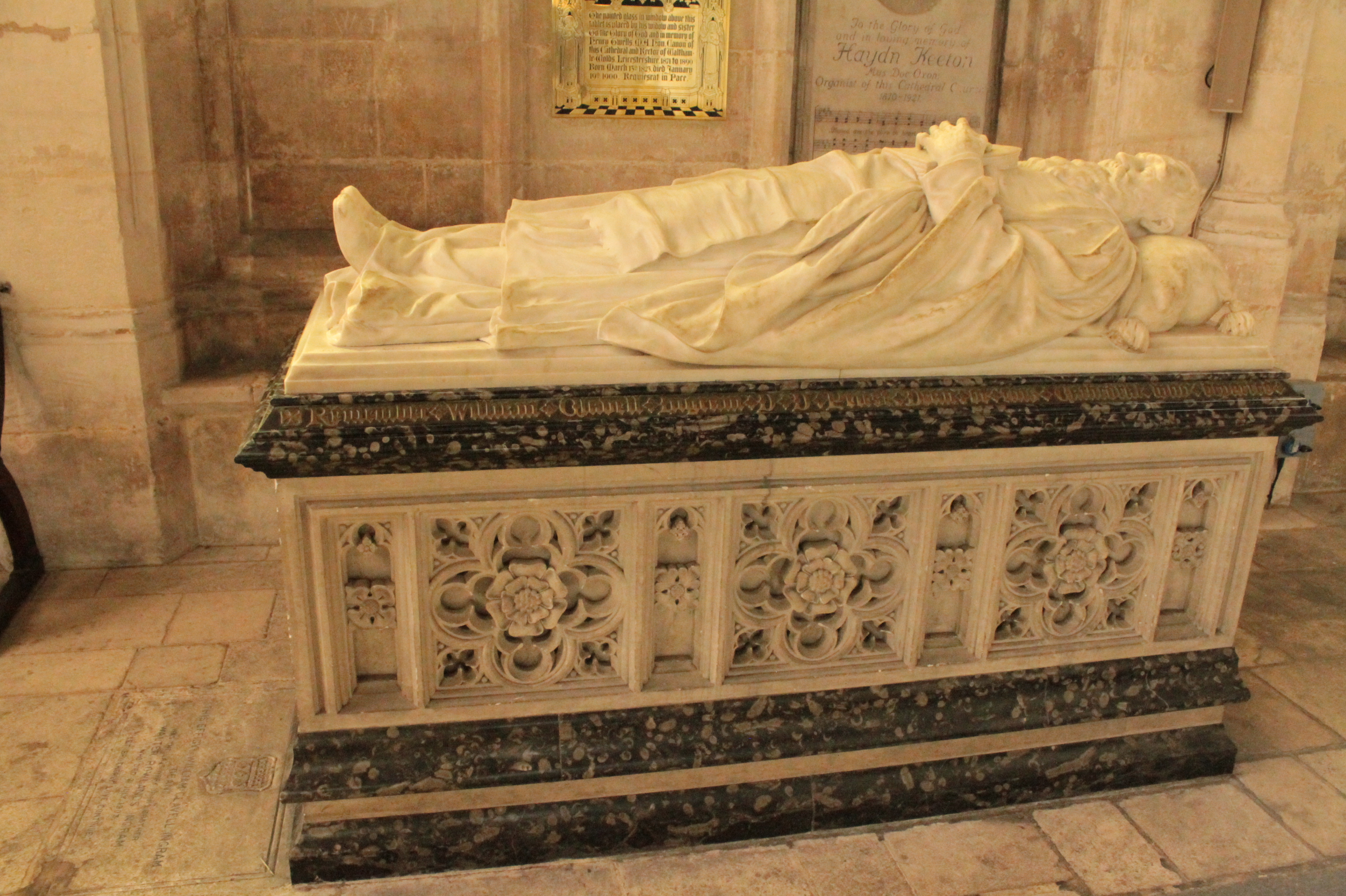
Memorial to William Clavell Ingram in Peterborough Cathedral

- T. Henry Jones 1867 - 1869 (formerly vicar of Greetham)
- George Venables 1869 - 1874
- William Clavell Ingram 1874 - 1893 (afterwards Dean of Peterborough)
- Maurice Theodore Brown 1893 - 1911 (formerly vicar of St Barnabas’ Church, New Humberstone, Leicester, afterwards vicar of St Dionysius' Church, Market Harborough)
- Frederick Billingsley Ambrose Williams 1913 - 1918 (afterwards vicar of Wymondham)
- E. E. Smith 1918 - 1923
- J.R. Quarterman 1923 - 1938 (afterwards vicar of St Paul's Church, Leicester)
- Victor Frederick Hambling 1938 - 1942
- J.W. Burford 1942 - 1952
- William Norman Waring 1952 - 1959 (formerly vicar of St Olave's Church, Mitcham, afterwards vicar of All Saints’ Church, Southend)
- Kenneth Frank Middleton 1960 - ca. 1981

== Organ ==
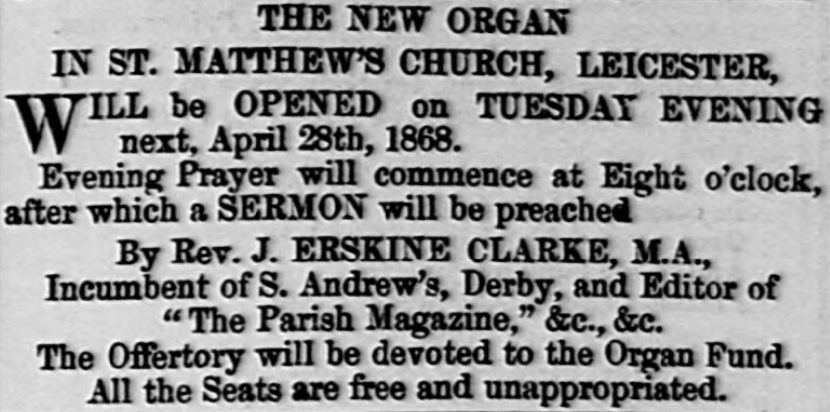
From the Leicester Journal - Friday 24 April 1868

A pipe organ was installed in 1868 by Bishop & Starr. It was enlarged in 1871 by the addition of the Bourdon and the choir division. It was rebuilt and enlarged in 1901 by Taylor and Son of Leicester, then being a three manual and pedal 27-stop instrument. A specification of the organ can be found on the National Pipe Organ Register.
