= Randolph Wise =

Randolph George Wise (20 January 1925 – 9 September 1999) was the Dean of Peterborough in the Church of England from 1981 until 1992 (made Dean Emeritus in 1997).

Educated at St Olave's and St Saviour's Grammar School he served with the RNVR from 1943 to 1947. After studying for a degree at The Queen's College, Oxford, he was ordained in 1952 and began his career with a curacy at Lady Margaret, Walworth. He was the Vicar of Stocksbridge from 1960 to 1966 and then the Bishop of London's Industrial Chaplain until 1972 when he became Guild Vicar of St Botolph, Aldersgate. From 1976 to 1981 he was Rector of Notting Hill.

Church of England titles
Preceded by Richard Shuttleworth Wingfield-Digby	Dean of Peterborough; 1981–1992	Succeeded by Michael Bunker
