= George Keay =

Scottish cricketer and educator

Personal information
- Full name: George Alexander Keay
- Born: 14 March 1897; Broughty Ferry, Forfarshire, Scotland
- Died: 8 August 1981 (aged 84); Swanage, Dorset, England
- Batting: Right-handed
- Bowling: Right-arm off break

Domestic team information
- Years: Team
- 1919–1920: Oxford University

Career statistics
Competition	First-class
Matches	3
Runs scored	26
Batting average	8.66
100s/50s	–/–
Top score	15
Balls bowled	144
Wickets	3
Bowling average	31.33
5 wickets in innings	–
10 wickets in match	–
Best bowling	3/11
Catches/stumpings	3/–
- Source: Cricinfo, 18 June 2020

George Alexander Keay MC (14 March 1897 – 8 August 1981) was a Scottish first-class cricketer and educator.

Keay was born in March 1897 at Broughty Ferry, Forfarshire. He was educated in England at Whitgift School, after which he immediately enlisted in the British Army as a second lieutenant with the Royal Field Artillery in July 1916. He was promoted to lieutenant in January 1918 and was awarded the Military Cross in the 1919 Birthday Honours. Following the war he resigned his commission and matriculated to Brasenose College, Oxford. While studying at Oxford, he made three appearances in first-class cricket for Oxford University, playing against the Gentlemen of England and the Australian Imperial Forces cricket team in 1919, and the British Army cricket team in 1920. He scored 26 runs in his three matches and took 3 wickets.

After graduating from Oxford, Keay became a schoolmaster. He gave evidence in the 1953 trial of Miles Giffard, whom he had taught at Rugby School, testifying to Giffard's strange behaviour whilst a pupil. Keay died at Swanage in August 1981.
