= Francis Lockier =

Francis Lockier, D.D. (b Norwich 9 May 1668 – d Peterborough 17 July 1740) was the Dean of Peterborough from 1725 until his death.

He was educated at Norwich School and Trinity College, Cambridge. He held the Yorkshire livings of Handsworth and Aston. He was also Chaplain to the King from 1717 until 17127.

Church of England titles
Preceded by John Mandeville	Dean of Peterborough; 1725–1740	Succeeded by John Thomas
