= Marsham Argles =

English Anglican priest (1814–1892)

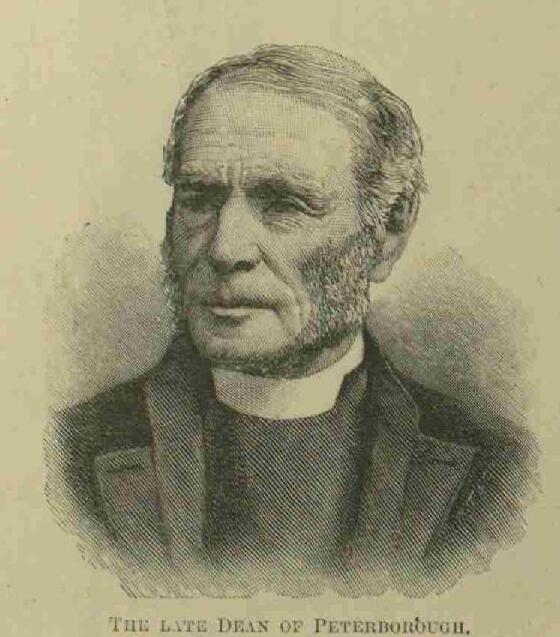
- Born: 7 July 1814
- Died: 1892 (aged 77–78)
- Alma mater: Merton College
- Occupation: Canon
- Parent(s): George Argles

Marsham Argles (7 July 1814 – 19 November 1892) was an Anglican priest who was Dean of Peterborough from 1891 until his death a year later.

Argles was born in Limerick, Ireland into the landed gentry, the son of Capt. George Argles of the Royal Navy and Jane Atkinson. His father died by suicide in 1831 after being in a "desponding state of mind", stabbing and shooting himself to death at the family home in Southampton.

He was educated at Merton College, Oxford, and ordained into the priesthood in 1838. His first posts were curacies at St Peter's Church, Bolton, St Martin-in-the-Fields, London, and Cranford, Northamptonshire after which he was appointed Vicar of Gretton.

In 1851, he was appointed rector at Barnack, Peterborough, which had been without a priest since 1844, when the disgraced Herbert Marsh was relieved of his duties after a scandal with one of his French mistresses. Argles used his own funds as a benefactor to Barnack Church and restored and expanded the 16th-century rectory. The rectory, now named Kingsley House, is a Grade II-listed building.

He then began a long association with Peterborough Cathedral, firstly as a Canon, then Chancellor, and finally Dean.

He married Margaret, daughter of George Davys, Bishop of Peterborough. He died in 1892 in Southsea, near Portsmouth. He had five sons, four of whom predeceased him, and four daughters: Mary, Alice, Edith, and Agnes. His youngest daughter, Agnes, married Francis Thicknesse. His surviving son was Rev. Canon George Marsham Argles.

Church of England titles
Preceded by John James Stewart Perowne	Dean of Peterborough; 1891 –1892	Succeeded by William Clavell Ingram
