= James Simpson (priest) =

British Anglican priest (1865–1948)

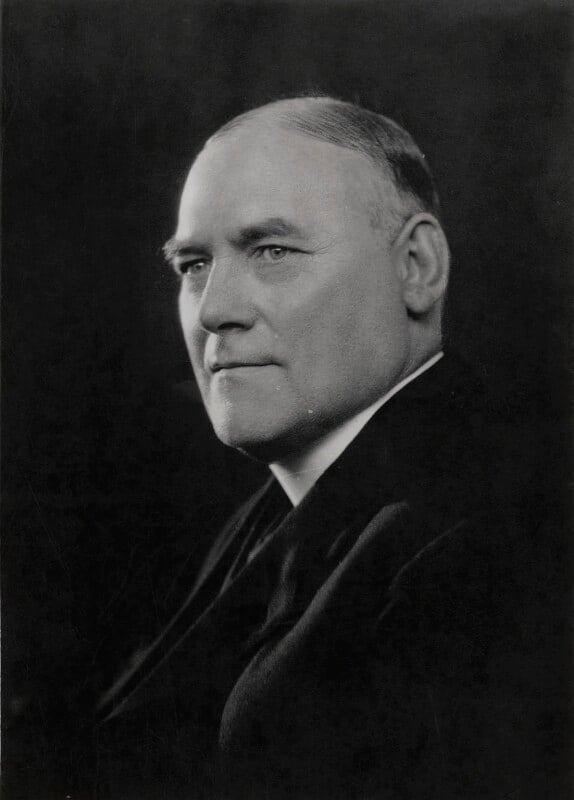
Simpson in 1928–48

James Gilliland Simpson (16 October 1865 – 10 October 1948) was the Dean of Peterborough in the Church of England from 1928 to 1942.

He was educated at the City of London School and Trinity College, Oxford, he was ordained in 1889 and began his career with a curacy at Leeds Parish Church. He was then appointed Vice Principal of Edinburgh Theological College after which he was Principal of Leeds Clergy School before becoming Canon of Manchester in 1910. Two years later he became a Canon of St Paul's, a post he held for seventeen years before his elevation to the Deanery. He was a noted author.

Church of England titles
Preceded by Arnold Henry Page	Dean of Peterborough; 1908 –1928	Succeeded by Noel Charles Christopherson
