= Augustus Saunders =

British headmaster and Anglican dean (1801–1878)

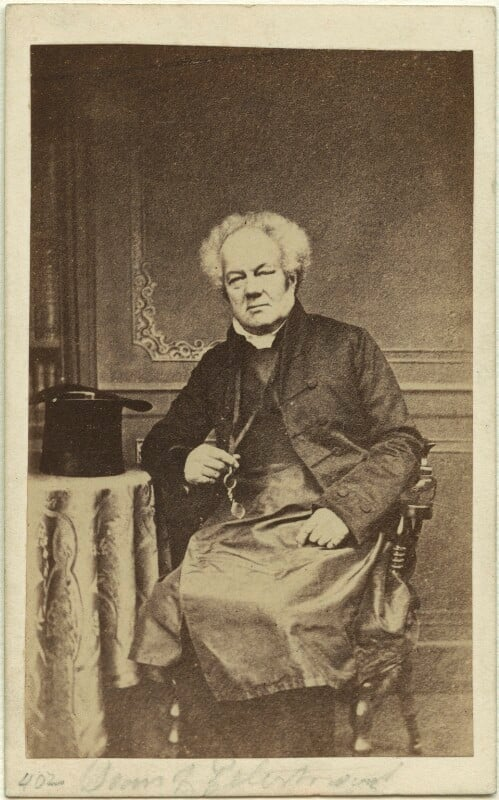
Saunders in 1863

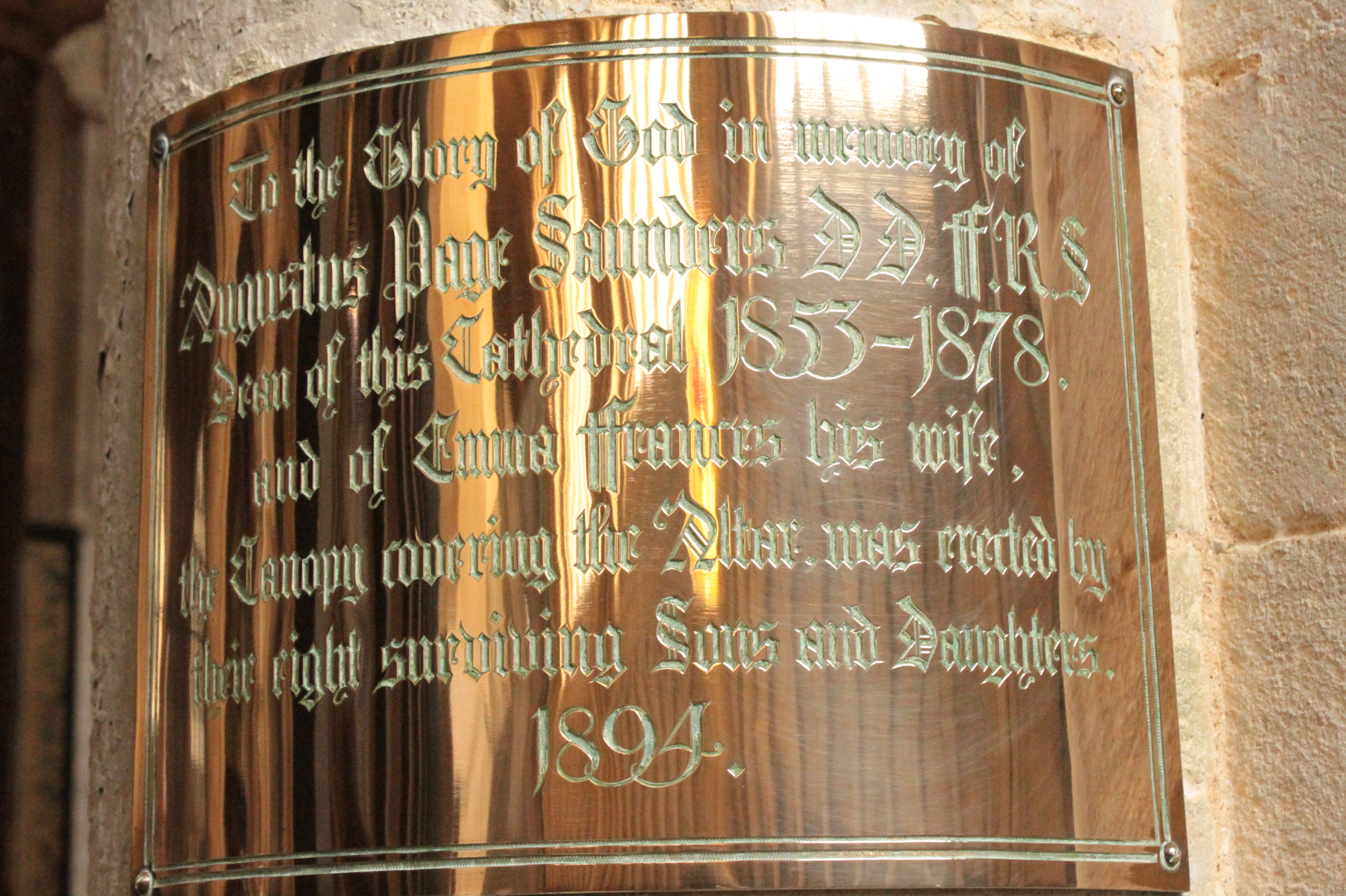
Memorial to Augustus Page Saunders, Peterborough Cathedral

Augustus Page Saunders FRS (1 March 1801 – 21 July 1878), was a British Headmaster of Charterhouse School and Dean of Peterborough Cathedral.

== Life ==
A son of Robert Saunders, of Lewisham, and his wife, Margaret Keble, he was educated at Charterhouse School and Christ Church, Oxford.

Saunders was ordained a priest in 1825. In 1832, he was appointed as vicar of Ravensthorpe, Northamptonshire, resigning in 1835. He had also been made a domestic chaplain to Richard Bagot, Bishop of Oxford, in 1832. He was awarded the degree of Doctor of Divinity in 1842.

He served as Headmaster of Charterhouse School from 1832 to 1853, and was then Dean of Peterborough from 1853 until his death. In 1872, he declined the Deanery of Winchester.

In 1833, he was elected a Fellow of the Royal Society.

== Memorials ==
A brass plaque was erected on a column in the south-east section of Peterborough Cathedral, close to the burial place of Mary, Queen of Scots.

== Family ==
He married Emma Frances Walford in 1838 and had 10 children.
