= Noel Christopherson =

British Anglican dean (1890–1968)

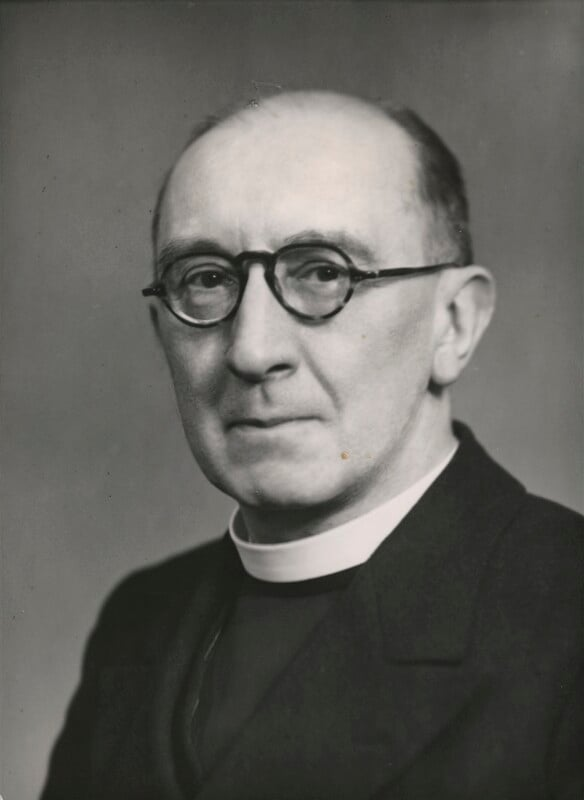
Christopherson in 1943

Noel Charles Christopherson, MC (21 December 1890 – 29 May 1968) was an Anglican priest who was the dean of Peterborough in the Church of England from 1943 until 1965.

== Biography ==
Christopherson was educated at Uppingham School and St John's College, Oxford.

He was ordained in 1913 and began his career with a curacy at St John's, Walworth. He was then appointed domestic chaplain to the Bishop of Newcastle. During the Great War, Christopherson was a temporary chaplain to the forces (TCF). At his interview in August 1916, it was noted that he was 25, single and could write and speak French. He was posted, first to the camp at Clipstone and then, in October, 1916, to the Western Front. The deputy chaplain-general on the Western Front noted that Christopherson was 'strong and fit'.

Christopherson remained a TCF until he was demobilised in 1919, having earned a Military Cross and a Mention in Despatches. The MC was gazetted on 30 May 1919, as part of the 1919 Birthday Honours, in a list of 'rewards for distinguished service in connection with military operations in France and Flanders'. When peace returned he became vicar of St John's, East Dulwich then archdeacon of Colombo. While there he was proposed as bishop of Melanesia but was not in the end appointed because an Evangelical was sought and he was Anglo-Catholic. From 1935 he was Vicar of Eltham and after that Rural Dean of Woolwich before his elevation to the deanery. He was considered for the vacant post of bishop of Lincoln in 1946 but Archbishop Fisher did not support his candidature, writing 'I am sure he is in his right place where he is and that he has not got the qualities' adding that he is 'likeable but unpunctual Christopherson, therefore, remained at Peterborough until his retirement.

Church of England titles
Preceded by James Gilliland Simpson	Dean of Peterborough; 1943–1965	Succeeded by Richard Shuttleworth Wingfield-Digby
