= Arnold Page =

Arnold Henry Page was the Dean of Peterborough in the Church of England from 1908 until 1928.

Born in Carlisle on 1 March 1851 and educated at Repton and Balliol, he was called to the bar in 1878 and ordained in 1883. He began his career with curacies at St Mary's, Bryanston Square and St Botolph's, Bishopsgate and was then appointed Rector of Tendring before his elevation to the Deanery. He died on 10 November 1943.

Church of England titles
Preceded by William Hagger Barlow	Dean of Peterborough; 1908 –1928	Succeeded by James Gilliland Simpson
