= James Curthroppe =

James Curtroppe, M.A. (Oxon) was the third dean of Peterborough.

He was prebendary of Lincoln Cathedral from 1544 and canon in the 6th prebend at Christ Church Cathedral, Oxford from 1546; and held both positions until his death in 1557.

== Notes ==
Church of England titles
Preceded by Gerard Carleton	Dean of Peterborough; 1549–1557	Succeeded by John Boxall
