= Michael Bunker =

English Anglican Dean

Michael Bunker (born 22 July 1937) was the Dean of Peterborough in the Church of England from 1992 until 2006.

Educated at Acton Technical College and Oak Hill Theological College, he was ordained in 1964. After curacies at St James’ Church, Alperton and the Parish Church of St Helen, Merseyside he held two incumbencies in Muswell Hill (St James then St Matthew) before his elevation to the Deanery.

Church of England titles
Preceded by Richard Shuttleworth Wingfield-Digby	Dean of Peterborough; 1992–2006	Succeeded by Charles William Taylor
