= Henry Beaumont (priest) =

Henry Beaumont LL.D. (died 30 June 1627) was a Canon of Windsor from 1622 to 1628 and Dean of Peterborough from 1617 to 1628.

== Career ==
He was educated at All Souls College, Oxford and graduated MA in 1574, BD in 1586, and DD in 1616.

He was appointed:

- Rector of Long Ditton, Surrey

He was appointed to the second stall in St George's Chapel, Windsor Castle in 1600, and held the stall until 1622 when he was appointed Dean of Windsor. On his death in 1627, he was buried in the chapel.
