= Francis Leycester =

Francis Lockier, BD was the first dean of Peterborough.

Leycester graduated from the University of Cambridge in 1521. A Cluniac monk he was the last prior of St Andrew's Priory, Northampton.

Church of England titles
Preceded by First incumbent	Dean of Peterborough; 1541–1542	Succeeded by Gerard Carleton
