= 1919 Birthday Honours (MC) =

This is a list of Military Crosses (MC) awards in the 1919 Birthday Honours.

The 1919 Birthday Honours were appointments by King George V to various orders and honours to reward and highlight good works by citizens of the British Empire. The appointments were made to celebrate the official birthday of The King, and were published in The London Gazette from 3 June to 12 August. The vast majority of the awards were related to the recently ended War, and were divided by military campaigns. A supplementary list of honours, retroactive to the King's birthday, was released in December 1919.

== Military Cross (MC) ==
=== Aden Peninsula ===
For valuable services rendered in connection with military operations in the Aden Peninsula —

- Lt. Charles Hodding, Indian Army (Aden Machine Gun Company)

=== Balkans ===
For distinguished service in connection with military operations in the Balkans —

- Lt. Thomas Howard Weldon Adams, Royal Field Artillery
- Temp Lt. John Reynolds Ashford, Surrey Yeomanry
- Temp Capt. Henry Martindale Bamford, Royal Engineers
- 2nd Lt. Ernest Bancroft DCM East Lancashire Regiment
- 2nd Lt. Dingwall Latham Bateson, King's Royal Rifle Corps, attd. Gloucestershire Regiment
- Lt. John James Bayley, Royal Garrison Artillery, Special Reserve
- Temp Capt. Owen Albert Beaumont, Royal Army Medical Corps
- Temp Capt. Robert K. Birnie Royal Army Medical Corps
- Lt. Cyril Ernest Burge, Yorkshire Light Infantry, Special Reserve, attd. South Lancashire Regiment
- Temp Capt. Mansfield Horace James Cherry, Royal Field Artillery
- Capt. Charles Clarke, Cameron Highlanders
- Lt. James Ellis Rutherford Dam, Royal Field Artillery, Special Reserve
- Temp Capt. Henry Montague Dayies, Welsh Regiment
- Lt. Ernest George Dickens, Royal Field Artillery
- Temp Capt. Robert Dickie, Royal Field Artillery
- Lt. James Johnston Dunlop, Lothians and Border Horse
- Temp Capt. Norman Eachus, Cheshire Regiment
- Temp Lt. Walter Stuart Emerson, Suffolk Regiment
- Capt. Richard Fitton, King's Royal Rifle Corps
- Rev. Charles Stanley Fleet, Royal Army Chaplains' Department
- Lt. William Fraser, Argyll and Sutherland Highlanders
- Lt. Arthur Bertie Gay, Royal Field Artillery
- Temp Capt. Benjamin Balfour de Witt Gibbs, Welsh Regiment
- Lt. William John Goodman, Royal Garrison Artillery
- Temp Lt. Ronald, Gray, Royal Field Artillery
- Temp Lt. Percy Henry Hadida, Gloucestershire Regiment
- Capt. Alfred Hastings St. George Haraersley, Shropshire Light Infantry
- Temp Capt. Joseph Bastable Harris, South Wales Borderers
- Capt. Allan Hartree, Royal Garrison Artillery
- Lt. Albert Haw, Royal Field Artillery, Special Reserve
- Capt. Arthur Hardie Hill, Royal Garrison Artillery
- Temp Capt. Eric Carew Hudson, Machine Gun Corps
- Capt. William Webb Humphreys, Duke of Cornwall's Light Infantry
- Lt. Reginald Leyfield, Middlesex Regiment
- Temp Lt. Andrew Logan, Royal Field Artillery
- Lt. Montague Percy Lothian, Argyll and Sutherland Highlanders
- Temp Capt. Wilfred Victor Macaskie, Royal Army Medical Corps
- Capt. Alistair Cameron Macdonald, Royal Army Medical Corps, Special Reserve
- Lt. Harold Miclntosh, Argyll and Sutherland Highlanders
- Lt. Cedric Armyn Cecil May, Cheshire Regiment
- Capt. Herbert Thomas Moore, Royal Garrison Artillery
- Lt. Roger Morton, Cheshire Regiment
- Temp Capt. David Roy Orr, Scottish Rifles
- Temp Capt. Robert Elias Lloyd Owen, Royal Garrison Artillery
- Temp Lt. Ronald William Parviii
- Capt. Malcolm Currie Peake, Royal Lancaster Regiment
- Temp Lt. Alec Peters
- Capt. Herbert Phillips, Middlesex Regiment
- Capt. Alexander Hastings Renny, Royal Scots
- Temp Lt. Alfred Maurice Rex, Royal Field Artillery
- Temp Lt. George Herbert Richmond, Shropshire Light Infantry
- Capt. Harold Robert Herman Rouquette, Royal Garrison Artillery
- Capt. Selby Shaw, Royal Garrison Artillery
- Temp Capt. James Robert Fyfe Smith, Royal Field Artillery
- Lt. John Henry Smith, Royal Garrison Artillery
- Capt. George Foster Stedman, York and Lancaster Regiment
- Lt. John Francis Dawes Steedman, Royal Engineers
- Temp Lt. Frederick Alexander Stephenson, South Wales Borderers
- 2nd Lt. Cyril Parker Stevens, Duke of Cornwall's Light Infantry
- Temp Lt. John Samuel Stott DCM Argyll and Sutherland Highlanders
- Lt. Edgar Aubrey Stringer, Hampshire Royal Garrison Artillery T.F
- Temp Capt. William Edward Sunderland DCM Royal Field Artillery
- Lt. Charles Copley Swift, Royal Engineers
- Lt. Albert Thomas, Duke of Cornwall's Light Infantry
- Temp Lt. Harry William Thomas, Machine Gun Corps
- Lt. John Ernest Howard Tripp, Royal Garrison Artillery, Special Reserve
- Lt. Leslie Francis Vick, Royal Field Artillery
- Capt. Phillip Lovibond Villar, South Wales Borderers
- Temp 2nd Lt. Frank Stockdale Walker, Cheshire Regiment
- Temp Lt. Alfred Waters Wells, Machine Gun Corps
- Temp 2nd Lt. John Samuel White MM Royal Engineers
- Temp Lt. David Wilson, Royal Garrison Artillery
- Temp Lt. Edwin Frank Woodsford, Royal Army Service Corps
- Lt. Stanley Doubleday Wright, Derbyshire Yeomanry

=== Eastern Russia ===
For distinguished services rendered in connection with military operations in Eastern Russia —

- Temp Capt. Robert J. MacAlpine OBE

=== France and Flanders ===
For distinguished service in connection with military operations in France and Flanders—

- Temp Capt. Thomas Walter Adam, Royal Engineers
- Temp Capt. Frederick Adams, Suffolk Regiment
- Temp Capt. Edward Homfray Addenbrooke, Gloucestershire Regiment
- Temp Lt. Frank Charles Ager, Liverpool Regiment
- Lt. Ernest Edward Ainsley, Royal Horse Artillery
- Lt. James Todd Allardice, Royal Highlanders
- Lt. Ronald Edward Taylor Allen, Royal Field Artillery
- Temp Lt. Andrew Miller Anderson, Royal Irish Rifles
- 2nd Lt. Charles Jamieson Anderson, Royal Garrison Artillery
- Temp Regimental Sergeant Maj. Hugh Anderson, Army Cyclist Corps
- Lt. Roderick Andrew Anderson, Scottish Rifles
- Lt. Thomas Anderson, Royal Garrison Artillery
- Temp Capt. William Anderson, Royal Army Veterinary Corps
- Lt. William Balfour Anderson, Highland Light Infantry
- Capt. Kenneth Forsyth Angus, Royal Garrison Artillery
- Lt. Seymour Willoughby Anketell-Jones, Royal Garrison Artillery
- Capt. Hesleytyne Oswals Charlton Anne, Royal Field Artillery
- Lt. John Heap Appleton, 4th Res. of Cavalry
- 2nd Lt. Cuthbert Alphonse Arnold, Royal Garrison Artillery
- Temp Lt. Cecil Rhodes Arnott, Machine Gun Corps
- Lt. Frederick William Ashard, Seaforth Highlanders
- Capt. Howard Dudley Ashby, Royal Garrison Artillery
- Temp Lt. Robert Leslie Ashcroft, Royal Lancaster Regiment
- Lt. Reginald St. George Atchley, Royal Field Artillery
- Capt. John Smallshaw Atherton, Royal Army Service Corps
- Temp Lt. George Nelson William Atkinson, Machine Gun Corps
- Temp Capt. Herbert Atkinson, Northumberland Fusiliers
- Temp Lt. Alfred Jubus Auret, Royal Engineers
- Temp 2nd Lt. Janes Arthur Ayles, Royal Engineers
- Lt. Elliott Glasspool Baker, Dorsetshire Regiment
- Temp Lt. Reginald James Baker, Royal Fusiliers
- Lt. Christopher Lucy Baldwin, Royal Artillery
- Lt. Thomas Oscar Balk, Royal Engineers
- 2nd Lt. George Bannell, Royal Sussex Regiment
- Lt. Arthur Digby Banting, Royal Garrison Artillery
- Temp Capt. Arthur Stapleton Barker, Duke of Cornwall's Light Infantry
- Lt. Frank Lewis Thornhill Barlow, Welsh Guards, attd. Machine Gun Regiment
- Temp Lt. Leonard Barnes, Royal Field Artillery
- Rev. Richard Langley Barnes, Royal Army Chaplains' Department
- Lt. Bernard Maurice Barr, Royal Field Artillery
- Lt. Frank Peace, Barrett, Yorkshire Dragoons
- Lt. Henry Barrett, Royal Field Artillery
- Lt. Randle Charles Barrington-Foote, Royal Field Artillery
- 2nd Lt. Roderick Barron, North Staffordshire Regiment
- Temp Lt. Frederick William Bartholomew, Machine Gun Corps
- Lt. David Hill Batchelor, Royal Scots
- 2nd Lt. Ronald Alec Bates, Royal Field Artillery
- Temp Lt. Bertram Saxon Beale, Tank Corps
- Capt. Hon Wentworth Henry Canning Beaumont, Machine Gun Regiment
- Sergeant Maj. George Beck DCM Royal Warwickshire Regiment
- Lt. Albert Caleb Beckett DCM Royal Engineers
- Temp Lt. Alfred Ernest Beddow, Tank Corps
- Lt. Alfred Bedford, Nottinghamshire and Derbyshire Regiment
- Lt. Harold John Bednall, Royal Field Artillery
- Lt. Norman Wendover Beeson, Royal Field Artillery
- Rev. James Arthur Herbert Bell, Royal Army Chaplains' Department
- Temp Lt. Francis Bell, Machine Gun Corps
- Lt. Geoffrey Foxall Bell, Royal Field Artillery
- Lt. Montague Bellamy, Royal Garrison Artillery
- Lt. Eric Norman Wood Bennett, Royal Field Artillery
- Lt. George Guy Marsland Bennett, Royal Irish Rifles, and Machine Gun Corps
- Lt. Stanley Joseph Docking Berger, Nottinghamshire and Derbyshire Regiment
- 2nd Lt. Leonard Williams Bethell, Royal Field Artillery
- Lt. Reginald Norton Betts, Liverpool Regiment
- Lt. Andrew Wheldon Biles, Royal Engineers
- Lt. Edward Arnold Binney, Royal Field Artillery
- Temp Lt., Hay Ellerton Binns, Royal Engineers
- Lt. Albert Harold Birch, Royal Field Artillery
- Lt. William Reginald Birch, 1st Dragoons
- Lt. Oliver Bird, Welsh Guards
- Lt. William Birnie, Seaforth Highlanders
- Capt. George Hitchcock Blake, Royal Army Service Corps attd. Rifle Brigade
- Lt. William Edmund Roberts Blood, Royal Engineers
- Temp Lt. Arthur Noel Bloor, Leicestershire Regiment
- Temp Capt. Frederick Edward Vivian Blowen, South Wales Borderers, attd. Cheshire Regiment
- Lt. Douglas Roper Blundell, London Regiment
- Lt. Harold Bond, Royal Garrison Artillery
- Temp Lt. Frank Thomas Foster Bone, Machine Gun Corps
- Lt. Worship Booker, North Irish Horse
- Lt. Francis Edward Henry Bostock, Royal Field Artillery
- Temp Regimental Sergeant Maj. Herbert William Boulger, Royal Engineers
- Lt. Richard West Bowen, Gloucestershire Regiment, attd. Devonshire Regiment
- Temp Lt. Frank George Bower, Middlesex Regiment
- Lt. Alexander Murray Bowman, Highland Light Infantry
- Capt. Reginald Courtenay Boyle, West Somerset Yeomanry
- 2nd Lt. Donald Edward Brackenbury, Royal Field Artillery
- Temp Lt. Harold Frank Brand, Royal Engineers
- Lt. Reginald Briars, South Staffordshire Regiment
- Lt. John Mindrum Briggs, Durham Light Infantry, and Machine Gun Corps
- Temp Capt. Alfred John Brightwell, West Yorkshire Regiment
- Temp Quartermaster and Capt. Harry Britton, Liverpool Regiment
- Temp 2nd Lt. Gilbert Brooking, Royal Army Service Corps
- Temp 2nd Lt. Leslie Dyker Brothers, Royal Army Service Corps
- Lt. Laurence Broughton, Royal Garrison Artillery
- Temp Lt. Charles Barrington Brown
- 2nd Lt. Cyril Brown, Royal Berkshire Regiment
- Lt. Francis Maxwell Brown, Royal Garrison Artillery
- Lt. James Brown, Royal Garrison Artillery
- Lt. Kenneth Robert Brown Royal Garrison Artillery
- Temp Lt. Robert Brown, Royal Engineers
- Lt. Thomas Gilbert Brown, West Riding Regiment
- Lt. Victor Frederick Browne, Royal Artillery
- Lt. Jack Bertram Browning, Royal Engineers
- Temp Capt. Robert Bruce, Royal Engineers
- Lt. William George Buchanan, Royal Field Artillery
- Temp Lt. Kenneth Dudley Bullpitt, Tank Corps
- Temp Lt. Alec Burgess, Royal Engineers
- Lt. William Bernard Burke, Royal Irish Rifles
- Lt. William Patrick Burns, East Lancashire Regiment, attd. Tank Corps
- Lt. Joseph Augustus Burnside, North Lancashire Regiment
- Temp 2nd Lt. Cecil Burton, Royal Engineers
- Quartermaster, and Capt. Noah Burton, Royal Lancaster Regiment
- Lt. Wynne Colby Butcher, Royal Garrison Artillery
- Lt. Leolin George Butler, Royal Engineers
- Lt. Edward Reed Byas, North Staffordshire Regiment
- Temp Capt. Thomas Geoffrey Caddick-Adams, Machine Gun Corps
- Temp Lt. Geoffrey Charles, Caddy, Machine Gun Corps
- 2nd Lt. Henry Forbes Calder, Royal Highlanders
- Capt. Oliver Reginald Caldwell, Royal Garrison Artillery
- Lt. Robert Cameron, Royal Engineers
- Temp Capt. Colin Bruce Campbell
- Lt. John Charles Campbell, Royal Horse Artillery
- Temp Lt. William Lamont Campbell, Royal Engineers
- Lt. Miles Howell Canning, Royal Engineers
- Lt. Frank Carpenter, Royal Field Artillery
- Temp Lt. George Aaron Carr, King's Royal Rifle Corps
- Temp Lt. James Carr, Motor Machine Gun Corps
- Lt. Henry William Carter, Royal West Surrey Regiment
- Temp Capt. Herbert Frederic Carter
- Temp Capt. Robert Burnside Carter Royal Army Medical Corps
- Capt. John Cartland, Royal Warwickshire Regiment, attd. Royal Sussex Regiment
- Temp Capt. Cecil Caradoc Carus-Wilson, Royal Marine Artillery
- Lt. Carl Furness Casper, Royal Garrison Artillery
- Capt. Godfrey Ernest Castle, Royal Field Artillery
- Temp Lt. Joshua Rowe Cater, Royal Field Artillery
- Capt. Wilmot Smyth Caufield, Leinster Regiment
- Lt. Ronald Valentine Cecil Cavendish, Nottinghamshire and Derbyshire Regiment, attd. Argyll and Sutherland Highlanders
- Capt. Harry Chambers, Royal Garrison Artillery
- Lt. William George Chandler, Suffolk Regiment
- Lt. George Chaney, Gloucestershire Regiment
- Temp Lt. Francis Eglington Charter, Royal Field Artillery
- Lt. Harold Edwin Cheeseman, Royal Field Artillery
- Quartermaster and Capt. James Patrick Cherry, Durham Light Infantry
- Temp Capt. Alexander Ian Chesney, attd. Intell. Corps
- 2nd Lt. Haydn Chester, Royal Garrison Artillery
- 2nd Lt. Percy Herbert Chinnery, Royal Field Artillery
- Temp Lt. Pearson Choate, Middlesex Regiment
- Temp Capt. Cyril Bayley Christopherson, Welsh Regiment
- Rev. Noel Charles Christopherson, Royal Army Chaplains' Department
- Capt. William King Churchhouse, Royal Army Medical Corps
- Temp 2nd Lt. George Wilson Clark, East Yorkshire Regiment
- Lt. Hudson Owen Clark, Royal Garrison Artillery
- Temp Lt. Arthur Leslie Rimmer Clarke, Royal Engineers
- Temp Lt. Edwin John Clarkson, Royal Engineers
- Temp Lt. Alfred Maxwell Cleghorn, Royal Engineers
- Lt. Charles Mathew Clode, Norfolk Regiment
- Temp Capt. William Garnett Codling, Royal Engineers
- Lt. William Melville Codrington, Royal Engineers
- Lt. Walter Ashton Coker, Loyal North Lancashire Regiment
- Rev. Charles Cole-Hamilton, Royal Army Chaplains' Department
- Temp Capt. Howard Ebenezer Collier Royal Army Medical Corps
- Lt. Walter Collins, Gordon Highlanders
- Lt. John Percy Colson MM West Riding Regiment
- Lt. James Douglas Conover, Royal Field Artillery
- 2nd Lt. Thomas Henry Constable MM Loyal North Lancashire Regiment, attd. York and Lancaster Regiment
- Temp 2nd Lt. John Stevens Cook, Royal Lancaster Regiment
- Lt. Michael Edwin Cook, Royal Field Artillery
- Lt. Reginald Valentine Travers Cooke, Devon Royal Garrison Artillery
- Quartermaster and Lt. William Coombes DCM Machine Gun Corps
- Temp Lt. Charles Ernest Tyrone Cooper, Seaforth Highlanders
- Lt. Cyril Harrison Cooper, Northumberland Fusiliers
- Temp 2nd Lt. John Alfred Guy Coote, Suffolk Regiment
- Lt. Fiennes Wykeham Mann Cornwallis, 17th Lancers, Machine Gun Corps
- Temp 2nd Lt. George Reginald Court, Tank Corps
- Lt. Norman Cowell, Royal Garrison Artillery
- Company Sergeant Maj. John Cowie, Royal Highlanders
- 2nd Lt. Samuel John Cox, Royal Garrison Artillery
- Temp Lt. Edward Charles Coxwell, Worcestershire Regiment
- Temp Capt. Walter Crabtree Royal Army Medical Corps
- Temp Lt. Archibald Campbell Craig
- Capt. Henry David Cook Craig, Highland Light Infantry
- Capt. Finlay Ross Cramb, Gordon Highlanders Royal Engineers
- Lt. Gervase Watson Crawshaw, Manchester Regiment
- Lt. Jack William Leslie Crawshay, Welsh Guards
- Temp Capt. Walter Robert Creighton, Royal Army Service Corps
- 2nd Lt. George Herbert Critchley, Royal Horse Artillery
- Lt. Charles Dymock Crofts, Royal Field Artillery
- Capt. Thomas Grant Crosse, Royal Garrison Artillery
- Capt. Guy Robert Crouch, Oxfordshire and Buckinghamshire Light Infantry, attd. Gloucestershire Regiment
- Lt. Reginald Joe Calthrop Crowden, Lincolnshire Regiment
- Lt. James Crowley, 5th Dragoon Guards
- Lt. Richard Hunt Croydon, Royal Field Artillery
- Lt. William Rowan Cruikshank, Royal Field Artillery
- Lt. Alfred Frederick Morice Capel Cure, Royal Horse Artillery
- Lt. Cyril William Daboorn, Royal Garrison Artillery
- Quartermaster and Lt. William Dadd, Royal Warwickshire Regiment
- Temp Lt. Thomas Daggar, Royal Engineers
- Battery Sergeant Maj. Herbert Graham Dale, Royal Field Artillery
- Lt. John Charles Dallas, Middlesex Regiment
- Company Sergeant Maj. Henry Dalton, Argyll and Sutherland Highlanders
- Rev. Eugene Daly, Royal Army Chaplains' Department, Royal Army Medical Corps
- Lt. Basil Danells, Sussex Yeomanry, attd. Machine Gun Corps
- Capt. Basil Derbyshire, Nottinghamshire and Derbyshire Regiment
- Capt. John Conyers d'Arcy, Royal Field Artillery
- Lt. Herbert Bruce Davidson, Royal Garrison Artillery
- Lt. Evan Cyril Davies, Duke of Cornwall's Light Infantry
- 2nd Lt. Owen Parry Davies, Royal Garrison Artillery
- Capt. Phillip Havelock, Royal Garrison Artillery
- Lt., Reginald George Reynolds Davies, 16th Lancers, attd. Machine Gun Corps
- Lt. Thomas Stanley Davis, Royal Field Artillery
- Temp 2nd Lt. Robert William Davison, Royal Irish Rifles, attd. Royal Inniskilling Fusiliers
- Lt. Ernest Philip Dawson, Royal Field Artillery
- Temp 2nd Lt. Gilbert Buy, Royal Engineers
- Temp Capt. Max Everard Delafield Royal Army Medical Corps
- Lt. Miles Christopher Dempsey, Royal Berkshire Regiment
- Lt. Lionel Herbert Dermer, Royal Engineers
- Company Lt. John Peter Fane de Salis, Royal Engineers
- Capt. Peter Daniel Desbrow, Royal Garrison Artillery
- Rev. Cecil Norman de Vine, Royal Army Chaplains' Department
- Temp Lt. Robert Cyril Dewhurst
- Lt. Algernon Newson Dickson, Royal Field Artillery
- Capt. Thomas Cedric Harold Dickson, Royal Dublin Fusiliers, attd. Royal Inniskilling Fusiliers
- Lt. Philip Kenelm Digiby-Jones, Royal Fusiliers
- Temp Capt. Norman Margrave Dillon, Tank Corps
- Temp Lt. Alfred-Benjamin Diplock, Lancashire Fusiliers
- Lt. Alfred Chessington Dixon, Tank Corps
- Lt. Gordon Stewart Dixon, Royal Field Artillery
- Temp Lt. Hubert John Dixon, Royal Warwickshire Regiment
- Lt. Reginald Crawshaw Dobson, Royal Garrison Artillery
- Lt. Robert Dobson, Royal Lancaster Regiment
- Lt. William Mansfield Dohson, Royal Garrison Artillery
- Temp Lt. William-Mark Dodd, York and Lancaster Regiment
- Company Sergeant Maj. James Donnelly DCM MM Durham Light Infantry
- Temp Lt. James Downs, King's Own Yorkshire Light Infantry
- Lt. John Edwin Doyle, Lincolnshire Regiment, attd. Tank Corps
- Temp Capt. Joseph Stanislaus Doyle Royal Army Medical Corps
- Temp Lt. Douglas Laurel McCready Drew, Royal Garrison Artillery
- Capt. Alexander Erskdne Drynan Royal Army Medical Corps
- Lt.-John Rowland Dudin, Royal Field Artillery
- Lt. Arthur Paterson Duffes, Royal Garrison Artillery
- Rev. Joseph Henry du Moulin-Browne, Royal Army Chaplains' Department
- Lt. Leslie Duncan, London Regiment
- Capt. Alfred Joseph Dunlop Royal Army Medical Corps
- Temp Lt. Douglas Hamilton Dunlop, Royal Engineers
- Lt. John Donald Dunlop, Royal Scots Fusiliers
- Temp Lt. Edward Bernard Dunn, Royal Engineers
- Quartermaster and Capt. John Dunne, London Regiment
- Capt. Alan Algernon Mario Durand, Royal Field Artillery
- Temp Lt. Bernard Harry Durrant, Royal Engineers, attd. Machine Gun Corps
- Temp Lt. Robert Edward Edwards, West Riding Regiment
- Temp Capt. George Ernest Elkington Royal Army Medical Corps
- Temp Lt. Walter Parker Ellen, Royal Sussex Regiment
- Capt. Noel Bayzand Ellington, Cheshire Regiment
- Lt. Henry Ernest Elliott, Royal Garrison Artillery
- Temp Capt. Cotiway Trevor Ellis, Royal Welsh Fusiliers
- Lt. Samuel Gilbert Ellis, Royal Field Artillery
- Temp Lt. Charles Frederick Elsey, Royal Berkshire Regiment
- Lt., William Emslie, Gordon Highlanders, secd. Machine Gun Corps
- Lt. Alfred James Enoch, Nottinghamshire and Derbyshire Regiment, attd. Tank Corps
- Temp Lt. Hubert Etherington, Royal Garrison Artillery
- Capt. Philip Eustace-Smith, Northumberland Hussars
- 2nd Lt. Edward Rees Evans, Royal Field Artillery
- Temp Capt. Frederick William Evans
- Rev. John Evans, Royal Army Chaplains' Department
- Temp Lt. Owen Herbert Evaria, Machine Gun Corps
- Temp Lt. William Arthur Evans, Royal Engineers
- Lt. Charles Noble Fairburn, Royal Field Artillery
- 2nd Lt. Edward Faithorn, Royal Scots Fusiliers
- Temp Capt. Gilbert John Farie Royal Army Medical Corps
- Lt. Harold Lister Farquhar, Coldstream Guards
- Lt. Hamlyn George Faulkner, Machine Gun Corps
- Temp Capt. Franklin Leonard Fay, Royal Engineers
- Lt. Reginald Ernest Feiling, King Edward's Horse
- Temp Lt. Alfred Leopold Felton, Royal Fusiliers
- Lt. Thomas Frederick Fenn Royal Engineers
- Capt. Joseph Henry Fenner, Royal Garrison Artillery
- 2nd Lt. Alexander Straughan Fenwick Royal Garrison Artillery
- Lt. Alexander Wilson Ferguson, Royal Scots Fusiliers
- Temp Lt. Hugh Ferguson, Royal Engineers
- 2nd Lt. Ian Ross Ferguson, Royal Garrison Artillery
- Temp Lt. Thomas Dickson Ferguson, Royal Engineers
- Capt. William Pike Ferguson Royal Army Medical Corps
- Capt. Frederick Denton Field, Royal Garrison Artillery
- 2nd Lt. Charles Findlay, Royal Garrison Artillery
- Temp Lt. Douglas Herbert Fish, Royal Field Artillery
- Lt. Harry Williams Fisher, Royal Field Artillery
- Lt. Paull Fisher, Royal Engineers
- Temp Lt. Herbert Flesher, Royal Engineers
- Lt. Walter Leo Fletcher, Royal Field Artillery
- Temp Lt. John Ernest Crawford Flitch, Royal Field Artillery
- 2nd Lt. Harold Walter Ford, attd. South Staffordshire Regiment
- 2nd Lt. Kenneth Jermyn Ford, Royal Field Artillery
- Capt. Archibald Thomas Forman, Royal Field Artillery
- Temp Lt. Robert Archibald Forrest, York and Lancaster Regiment
- Lt. Gerald Forsyth, London Regiment
- Lt. John Fowler, Royal Welsh Fusiliers
- 2nd Lt. Edward Charles Fox, East Lancashire Regiment, attd. Cheshire Regiment
- Temp Capt. Henry Frampton, Somerset Light Infantry
- Temp Lt. Angus Jeffrey Eraser, Tank Corps
- Temp Lt. Charles Fraser, Manchester Regiment
- Temp 2nd Lt. John Baird Fraser, Royal Lancaster Regiment
- Capt. Robert CliffordFreeman, Royal Engineers
- Temp 2nd Lt. John Thomas French, Royal Engineers
- Temp Lt. John Laurence Fryers, Intell. Corps
- Lt. David Fergus Fulton, Royal Engineers
- Lt. Gordon Furze, Coldstream Guards
- Lt. Norman Franklin Gadsdoit, Essex Regiment, secd. Machine Gun Corps
- Temp 2nd Lt. Norman William Gallagher, Royal Engineers
- Temp Capt. John Brady Galligan Royal Army Medical Corps, attd. Royal Garrison Artillery
- Lt. Robert Angus Galloway, Royal Engineers
- Lt. Norman George Gane, Royal Scots Fusiliers
- Temp Capt. Arthur James Gardiner, Royal Field Artillery
- Capt. David Gould Gardiner Royal Army Medical Corps, attd. Devonshire Regiment
- Temp Lt. Hugh Gascoigne, Worcestershire Regiment
- Lt. Neville Archibald Gass, Royal Horse Artillery
- Lt. Charles de Lisle Gaussen, Royal Engineers
- Lt. Alan John Gee, Royal Field Artillery
- Temp Capt. Walter Hope George, Machine Gun Corps
- Lt. George Howard Gibbs, Royal Dublin Fusiliers
- Capt. Alexander Muir Gibson Royal Army Medical Corps
- 2nd Lt. Francis Stuart Gibson, Royal Garrison Artillery, Special Reserve
- Lt. James Forsyth Gibson, Royal Engineers
- Lt. Ernest Gilbert, Worcestershire Regiment
- Lt. Joseph Gill, West Yorkshire Regiment
- Temp 2nd Lt. Minto Rodger Gillanders, Royal Engineers
- Lt. Gordon Edward Charles Rowland Gilman, Royal Engineers
- 2nd Lt. Thomas Taylor Gilroy, West Riding Regiment
- Lt. Frederick Glasgow, Gloucestershire Regiment
- Lt. Augustin Munro Glen, Royal Field Artillery
- Temp Lt. Arthur Stanley Glover, Royal Engineers
- Lt. Malcolm Gibbs Goddaid, Royal Field Artillery
- Temp Lt. William Coxy Goddard, Royal Engineers
- Lt. Leslie Allison Godfree, Royal Field Artillery
- Lt. John Wentworth Godley, Royal Field Artillery
- Capt. Charles Eric Griffith Goodall, Lincolnshire Regiment
- Lt. Anthony Trevor Gooding, Royal Field Artillery
- 2nd Lt. Frank Jenkins Goodliff, Royal Field Artillery
- Temp 2nd Lt. Harold William Goodson, Bedfordshire Regiment, attd. Hertfordshire Regiment
- Temp Capt. Herbert Crawford Gordon, Royal Inniskilling Fusiliers
- Temp Capt. Thomas Gordon, Royal Army Veterinary Corps
- Capt. Hubert Maurice Gorringe, Royal Engineers
- Lt. George Gosnold, Royal Garrison Artillery
- Temp Quartermaster and Capt. Joseph Goss, King's Own Scottish Borderers
- Lt. Guy Francis Gough, Royal Irish Fusiliers
- Lt. John Lockhart Gow, Honourable Artillery Company
- 2nd Lt. William Younger Gow, Royal Warwickshire Regiment
- Temp Capt. Joseph Graham Royal Army Medical Corps
- 2nd Lt. Alexander John Grant, Highland Light Infantry
- Lt. William Albert Grasby, Machine Gun Corps
- Lt. Henry Charles Green, Royal Field Artillery
- Lt. Vincent Edward Green, North Staffordshire Regiment
- Temp Lt. Bertram Thomas Greenwood, Royal Engineers
- Capt. Harold Gustave Francis Greenwood, Royal Engineers
- 2nd Lt. March Greenwood, Royal Garrison Artillery
- Lt. Percy Williams Greest, Royal Field Artillery
- Lt. Thomas, Gregory, Royal Field Artillery
- Lt. Norman Grey, Royal Field Artillery
- Capt. William Arthur Grey-Wilson, Durham Light Infantry, attd. Machine Gun Corps
- Temp 2nd Lt. Gwynne Griffith, Essex Regiment, attd. London Regiment
- Lt. Ernest Cyril Griffiths, Royal Field Artillery
- Temp Lt. Ivor Clifford Griffiths, Machine Gun Corps
- Temp Capt. Alexander Sinclair Leslie Grove, Lincolnshire Regiment
- Rev. Sidney Groves, Royal Army Chaplains' Department
- 2nd Lt. George Guest, Royal Engineers
- Temp Lt. Michael Guthrie, Northumberland Fusiliers
- Temp Capt. John Kenneth Gwinnell, Royal Fusiliers
- Lt. Patrick Emmet Sarsfield Hackett, South Lancashire Regiment
- Lt. Thomas William Dalby Hackett, Royal Field Artillery
- Lt. Hubert Gordon Hague, Seaforth Highlanders
- 2nd Lt. James Haig, Royal Scots
- Lt. Herbert Haithwaite, Royal Engineers
- Temp 2nd Lt. Anthony Hall, York and Lancaster Regiment
- Capt. Alner Wilson Hall, London Regiment
- Lt. Lionel Reid Hall, Royal Scots
- 2nd Lt. William George Hall DCM Royal Field Artillery
- 2nd Lt. Peter Hamilton, Royal Field Artillery
- Lt. William Percy Hamilton, Royal Field Artillery
- Lt. Francis Aylmer Hamlet, Royal Dublin Fusiliers
- Lt. Robert Geoffrey Hammond, Royal Field Artillery
- Temp Lt. Henry David Hanbury, Royal Engineers
- Capt. Reginald Henry Osgood Hanbury, 15th Hussars
- Temp 2nd Lt. Ernest Thomas Gordon Hancock, Royal Garrison Artillery
- Lt. George Augustus Hancock, Nottinghamshire and Derbyshire Regiment
- Lt. Leonard Wyvill Hancock, Nottinghamshire and Derbyshire Regiment
- Capt. Augustus Cameron Hancocks, Royal Field Artillery
- Temp Capt. Thomas Milnes Harbottle, Royal Engineers
- Capt. Arthur Geoffrey Pallison Hardwick, Royal Army Medical Corps
- Capt. Bradford Hopewell Harper, Royal Engineers
- Sergeant Maj. Alma Inkerman Harris, Loyal North Lancashire Regiment
- Temp Capt. Richard Paget Harrison
- Lt. John Barker Hartley, Royal Garrison Artillery
- Temp Lt. Reginald Hartley, York and Lancaster Regiment
- 2nd Lt. Norman Leslie Hartridge, Royal Field Artillery
- Temp Lt. John James Harwood, Lancashire Fusiliers
- Temp Capt. Godfrey Sinclair Hasell, Royal Engineers
- Lt. Charles Henry Hastings, King's Own Yorkshire Light Infantry
- 2nd Lt. Daniel Evans Havard, Royal Garrison Artillery
- Lt. George Laurence Hawes, Royal Field Artillery
- Lt. Bernard Gwynne Twyford-Hawkes, Worcestershire Regiment
- Capt. Hervey Carleton Hawkins, Welsh Regiment attd. Liverpool Regiment
- Capt. James Charles Edward Hay, Scottish Rifles
- Lt. Richard Henry Percy Hayward, Royal Field Artillery
- Sergeant Maj. Walter Headland, Bedfordshire Regiment
- Capt. Thomas Lane Claypole Heald, Cheshire Regiment
- Lt. Maurice Healy, Royal Dublin Fusiliers
- Temp Regimental Sergeant Maj. Harry Heath, Worcestershire Regiment
- Temp Lt. Oliver Heggs, East Lancashire Regiment
- Temp Lt. Andrew Morris Henderson, Tank Corps
- Capt. George Francis Henderson, Scottish Horse Yeomanry, attd. Cameron Highlanders
- Temp Lt. James Liddell Henderson, Scottish Rifles, attd. Liverpool Regiment
- Temp Capt. Henry Thomas Richard Hendin, Royal Welsh Fusiliers
- Temp Capt. James Leith Hendry, Royal Army Medical Corps, attd. Royal Garrison Artillery
- Lt. Charles Henning, Royal Field Artillery
- Lt. Ian Mitchell Henry, Highland Light Infantry
- Temp Lt. Ernest William Herbert, Royal Field Artillery
- Lt. Evelyn Herbert, attd. Royal West Surrey Regiment
- Temp 2nd Lt. David Wighton Herd, Tank Corps
- Capt. James Roland Hewitt, Royal Field Artillery
- Regimental Quartermaster Sergeant James Laurence Heyworth, Liverpool Regiment
- Temp Capt. Cecil Barclay Hibbert, Machine Gun Corps
- Capt. Julian Hickey, Royal Field Artillery
- Lt. James Birchall Hide, Royal Garrison Artillery
- Temp Lt. Frank Frederick Arnold Higgitt, Tank Corps
- Temp Lt. Basil Benjamin Hill, Tank Corps
- Temp Lt. Thomas Harry Hill, Worcestershire Regiment
- Temp Capt. Arthur William Hills, Middlesex Regiment
- Lt. Leslie Hills, Royal Field Artillery
- Lt. Arthur Hinckley, Royal Garrison Artillery
- Temp Lt. George Vernon Hinds, Royal West Kent Regiment attd. Royal Engineers
- Lt. Frederick James Colquhoun Hindson, Royal Garrison Artillery
- 2nd Lt. Christopher Huntington Hird, Royal Engineers
- Temp Capt. Herbert Henry Hiscocks, Tank Corps
- Temp Lt. Christopher Gurney Hoare, Guards Machine Gun Regiment
- Temp 2nd Lt. Edwin Salter Hoare, Royal Engineers
- Temp 2nd Lt. Hubert Thomas Hockey MM Wiltshire Regiment
- Temp Capt. George Agincourt Hodges, Royal Army Medical Corps, attd. Tank Corps
- Temp Capt. Geoffrey Walter Hodgkinson
- Temp Lt. Phillip Sydney Hodgkinson, Tank Corps
- Capt. Roger Thomas Alexander Hog, Royal Field Artillery
- Temp Lt. George Langdon Hogbin, Royal Field Artillery
- Lt. Thomas Alexander Hogg, Royal Field Artillery
- Capt. Harold Roy Holcroft, Worcestershire Regiment
- Temp Capt. Thomas Adamson Holden, Durham Light Infantry
- Lt. Sidney James Holloway, London Regiment, attd. Lancashire Fusiliers
- Temp Capt. William Bradley Holme, Liverpool Regiment
- Sergeant Maj. Henry Holmes, Northamptonshire Regiment
- Temp Capt. John David William Holmes, Royal Engineers
- Capt. Jeffery John Archer, Viscount Holmesdale, Coldstream Guards
- Temp Capt. James Frederic Holt, Royal Engineers
- Temp Capt. Vernon Harrison Holt, Royal Garrison Artillery
- Lt. Gilbert Percivale Hoole, Royal Garrison Artillery
- Temp Lt., Ernest Jack Hooper, Tank Corps
- Lt. Harold Ridley Hooper, Suffolk Regiment
- Lt. John Joseph Hooper, Royal Garrison Artillery
- Lt. Keith Hanslip Hopkins, Rifle Brigade
- Lt. Cyril Rupert Horley, Oxfordshire and Buckinghamshire Light Infantry
- Lt. Bertram Percy Hornby, Royal Field Artillery
- Quartermaster and Lt. William Wake Horsman, Nottinghamshire and Derbyshire Regiment
- Temp Lt. Kenneth Charles Horton, Royal Engineers
- Temp Capt. Gerald Vernon Hotblack
- Lt. Ernest Frederick Housden, Royal Field Artillery
- Capt. Algernon George Mowbray Frederick Howard, Duke of Lancaster's Own Yeomanry
- Capt. Alfred Walpole Howard, Royal Inniskilling Fusiliers
- Capt. Eric Spencer Gravely Howard, Royal Field Artillery
- Company Sergeant Maj. Sidney Thomas Hubbard, Rifle Brigade
- Temp Lt. Thomas William Hucker, King's Own Yorkshire Light Infantry
- Lt. Cuthbert Lang Huggins, 3rd Hussars
- Lt. Alfred Harcourt Hughes, Royal Field Artillery
- Capt. Alfred Morgan Hughes, Royal Army Medical Corps
- Temp Capt. Edward George Victor Hughes, Royal West Kent Regiment
- Lt. George Leonard Hughes, Royal Garrison Artillery
- Lt. Philip Charles Hughes, City of London Yeomanry, attd. London Regiment
- Lt. Thomas Maughan Hume, Royal Field Artillery
- Lt. Henry Humphreys, Royal Engineers
- Lt. Leonard William Hunt, Somerset Light Infantry, attd. Lancashire Fusiliers
- Temp Lt. Albert Richmond Hunter, late Northumberland Fusiliers
- Rev. John Miller Hunter, Royal Army Chaplains' Department
- 2nd Lt. William Aldred Hunter, Royal Garrison Artillery
- Lt. Robin Leslie Hutchins, Royal Horse Artillery
- Lt. David Hutton, Gordon Highlanders, attd. 1st Battalion
- Temp Lt. Percival Forbes Huttbn, Northumberland Fusiliers
- Capt. Gervas Huxley, East Yorkshire Regiment, attd. Intell. Corps
- Temp Capt. Claudius George Hyde, Royal Garrison Artillery
- Temp Lt. Walter Ingham, Royal Engineers
- Lt. Harold York Irwine, Royal Garrison Artillery
- 2nd Lt. Wilfred Lingard Jackson, Royal Garrison Artillery
- Lt. Lionel Ernest Brooksby Jacob, London Regiment
- 2nd Lt. Leslie Harrison Jaques, Royal Field Artillery
- Temp Lt. Arthur Jarvis, Gloucestershire Regiment
- Capt. Franz Julius Jebens, Royal Fusiliers
- Temp Lt. John Samuel Jerome, Royal Engineers
- Lt. Charles Beckett Johnson, Liverpool Regiment
- Temp Lt. Herbert Thomas Johnson, Royal Engineers
- Lt. James Johnston, Highland Light Infantry
- Capt. James Charles Johnstone, Devonshire Regiment, attd. Intell. Corps
- Lt. Cyril Ernest Turner Jones, Royal Engineers
- Temp Lt. Edgar Thomas Jones
- Capt. Ion Mordecai Jones, Leinster Regiment, attd. Royal Inniskilling Fusiliers
- Battery Sergeant Maj. James Harry Jones DCM Royal Horse Artillery
- Temp Lt. Mervyn Vickers Jones, Royal Engineers
- Capt. Thomas Kirkham Jones, Royal Engineers
- Temp Lt. Thomas Lloyd Jones, Royal Welsh Fusiliers
- Temp 2nd Lt. Sydney Juleff, Royal Engineers
- Lt. Charles Robert Julian, Royal Garrison Artillery
- Temp Lt. Andrew Kay, King's Own Scottish Borderers
- Lt. Gerald Steinfeld Kaye, Royal Field Artillery
- Lt. Edward Hugo Ohm Keates, King's Own Yorkshire Light Infantry
- Lt. George Alexander Keay, Royal Field Artillery
- 2nd Lt. Eric Ernest Keen, Royal Garrison Artillery
- Lt. Reginald Thomas Keenan, Royal Field Artillery
- Temp 2nd Lt. Ernest Kelly, Machine Gun Corps
- Lt. Maurice Henry Vaughan Kendall, Royal Warwickshire Regiment
- Lt. Arthur Kennedy Royal Army Medical Corps
- Lt. Norman Dougall Kennedy, King's Own Scottish Borderers
- Temp Capt. Frank Brown Kenny, Royal Engineers
- Lt. Cuthbert Babington Kensington, Royal Garrison Artillery
- Lt. Henry Vernon Kerr, Monmouthshire Regiment
- 2nd Lt. Arthur Edwin Pomeroy Kershaw, Royal Field Artillery
- Capt. Geoffrey Goodier Kershaw, Manchester Regiment
- Temp Lt. Thomas Garbutt Key, Royal Field Artillery
- Temp Capt. Claude Gorringe Killick, Durham Light Infantry
- Capt. Geoffrey Stuart King, West Somerset Yeomanry
- Lt. Harold James King, Royal Garrison Artillery
- Temp Lt. Peter King, Royal Engineers
- Temp Lt. Joseph Julius Kino, Royal Field Artillery
- Lt. Eric George Kirk, Royal Garrison Artillery
- Temp Capt. Robert Closeburn Kirkpatrick, Royal Garrison Artillery
- Lt. Alfred Frederick Kite, Royal Field Artillery
- Temp Lt. Charles Henry Knight, Royal Sussex Regiment
- Lt. Leonard James Knight, South Staffordshire Regiment
- Capt. Vere Ronald Krohn, Royal Field Artillery
- Capt. Eustace John Laine, Royal Army Veterinary Corps
- Capt. Colin Moncrieff Laing, Northumberland Hussars Royal Artillery
- Temp Lt. Arthur William Lambert, Northumberland Fusiliers
- Lt. John Henry Graham Lang, Royal Field Artillery
- Lt. Arthur Herbert Legh, Cheshire Regiment
- Temp Capt. Edgar Couch Lemon, Royal Engineers
- Lt. James Dawson Leslie, Gordon Highlanders
- 2nd Lt. Albert Edward Lewis, Royal Field Artillery
- Lt. John Frederick Allen Lewis, Pembroke Yeomanry
- Temp Lt. Thomas Charles Stephens Lewis, Army Cyclist Corps
- Lt. Vivian Maurice Lewis, Welsh Regiment
- Temp Capt. Percy Light, Cheshire Regiment
- Lt. Robert John Liddle, Scottish Rifles
- Temp Lt. Charles Crawford Lindsay, Royal Engineers
- Temp Lt. Donald Septimus Lindsay, Machine Gun Corps
- Lt. William James Lindsay-Forbes, Royal Field Artillery
- Temp Capt. Henry James Linfoot
- Temp Capt. Havelock Thomas Lippiat, Royal Army Medical Corps
- Lt. Alexander Campbell Wishart Little, Royal Garrison Artillery
- Temp Capt. Charles Mellis Lloyd
- Lt. John Williatt Lloyd, Royal Engineers
- Temp Capt. Stanley Lloyd
- Lt. William Edward Lloyd, Royal Garrison Artillery
- Temp Lt. Cyril Logan, Royal Inniskilling Fusiliers
- Temp Capt. John Logan, Royal Scots, secd. Machine Gun Corps
- Lt. Arthur George Thomas Lomer, Nottinghamshire and Derbyshire Regiment
- Rev. Henry Hugh Lonnguet Longuet-Higgins, Royal Army Chaplains' Department
- Temp Capt. Eric Gordon Loudoun-Shand
- Lt. George Cecil Lowbridge, Royal Engineers
- Temp 2nd Lt. Leonard Lowndes, Manchester Regiment, attd. Worcestershire Regiment
- Temp Lt. Merrick Dunlop Lucas, Gloucestershire Regiment
- Capt. John Noel Lumley, 13th Hussars
- Temp Capt. William Lunn
- Temp 2nd Lt. Robert Reid Lyle, Tank Corps
- Rev. The Hon Charles Frederick Lyttelton, Royal Army Chaplains' Department
- Temp Capt. David McDonald McAlister, Royal Field Artillery
- Temp Capt. Douglas Robertson McBean
- Temp Capt. John Bertram McCabe, Royal Army Medical Corps
- Lt. Thomas Francis McDermott, Royal Garrison Artillery
- Lt. Kenneth Mackenzie Macdonald, Royal Field Artillery
- Temp Capt. Alexander James McDuff, Royal Field Artillery
- Temp Capt. Roderic MacGill, Royal Army Medical Corps
- Lt. George McGowan, Cheshire Regiment
- Lt. John Charles McGrath, Royal Field Artillery
- Rev. Archibald McHardy, Royal Army Chaplains' Department
- Lt. Duncan McFarlane McIntosh, Royal Scots Fusiliers
- Lt. William MacIntyre, Royal Highlanders, Welsh Regiment
- Lt. William Bertram McIntyre, Royal Garrison Artillery
- Lt. Wallace Rae McKaig, Liverpool Regiment
- Lt. George McKay, Gordon Highlanders, attd. Machine Gun Corps
- Sergeant Maj. Malcolm Mackay DCM Seaforth Highlanders
- Temp Capt. William Ian McKeand
- Lt. Ronald McKechnie, North Somerset Yeomanry
- Capt. Thomas Barrington McKee Royal Army Medical Corps
- Temp Lt. Kenneth Alexander McKelvey, Machine Gun Corps
- Capt. Hector David MacKenzie, Lovat's Scouts, Yeomanry
- 2nd Lt. Murdo Mackenzie MM Seaforth Highlanders
- Capt. Charles R. Mackintosh, attd. Royal Scots
- Capt. William Patrick MacLaughlin, Royal Garrison Artillery
- Temp 2nd Lt. Augustus McLoughlin, Machine Gun Corps
- Temp Capt. John McMillan Royal Army Medical Corps, attd. Tank Corps
- Lt. Norman McMonnies, Seaforth Highlanders, attd. Royal Engineers
- Capt. Hubert George McMullon, Royal Garrison Artillery
- Lt. Douglas McNaughton, attd. Highland Light Infantry
- Temp 2nd Lt. David Morrison McSwan, Royal Engineers, attd. Machine Gun Corps
- Temp Capt. Ivan Robert Madge, Royal Garrison Artillery
- Temp Capt. Duncan Malloch Royal Army Medical Corps
- 2nd Lt. Charles Graham Mann, Royal Warwickshire Regiment
- Lt. Douglas Bruce Upfield-Mann, Somerset Light Infantry
- Lt. Nathaniel Mann, Royal Garrison Artillery
- Capt. William Horace Mann, Royal Wiltshire Yeomanry
- Lt. William-Henry Mares, Royal Engineers
- Lt. Henry David Reginald Margesson, 11th Hussars
- Lt. Leonard David Marks, Royal Field Artillery
- Capt. Arthur Thornthwaite Marsden, North Lancashire Regiment
- Temp Lt. Alexander Marshall, Machine Gun Corps
- Capt. Norman Marshall, East Yorkshire Regiment
- Lt. Cyril Frederick Martin, Royal Garrison Artillery
- Lt. Frederick George Stephen Martin, Northamptonshire Regiment
- Lt. George Martin, Royal Garrison Artillery
- Quartermaster and Lt. Robert. Martin, London Regiment
- Lt. Thomas Fitzgerald Martin, Royal Field Artillery
- Temp Capt. Thomas Mason, Royal Fusiliers
- Capt. Charles Henri Masse, Royal Army Service Corps
- Temp Capt. Allan Massey Royal Army Medical Corps
- Capt. Ralph Frederick Hugh Massy-Westropp, Royal Dublin Fusiliers
- 2nd Lt. John George Mathieson, Seaforth Highlanders
- Capt. Peter Mathisen, Yorkshire Light Infantry, attd. Machine Gun Corps
- Temp Lt. Henry Idris Matthews, Machine Gun Corps
- Temp Capt. Richard FitzGerald Maurice, Tank Corps
- Lt. Maxwell Sidney Harold Maxwell-Gumbleton, Royal Field Artillery
- Lt. Edward Walter Nunn May, Royal Field Artillery
- Lt. Harry May DSO Royal Field Artillery, attd Royal Engineers
- Lt. Leopold Frederic May, North Staffordshire Regiment
- Lt. John William Mayer, Royal Garrison Artillery
- Temp Lt. Oscar Mayers, Royal Field Artillery
- Temp Lt. Alfred Geoffrey Horace Mayhew, Royal Field Artillery
- Temp Capt. Charles Fordred Mayosr, Northumberland Fusiliers
- Lt. Charles Stanley Meadows, Royal Field Artillery
- Capt. Herbert Meredith, North Staffordshire Regiment
- Lt. James White Merryweather, Royal Engineers
- Lt. Charles Edgar Metcalfe, Royal Field Artillery
- Lt. Sydney Herbert Mews, Royal Field Artillery
- Lt. Thomas Herbert Midgley, Royal Engineers
- Lt. Harry Midwood, Royal Field Artillery
- Capt. Bevis Lipscombe Miles, London Regiment
- Lt. Charles Frederick Miles, Royal Field Artillery
- Temp 2nd Lt. Alexander Stoddart Millar, Argyll and Sutherland Highlanders
- Lt. Douglas Owen d'Elboux Miller, Royal Field Artillery
- Lt. Euan Alfred Brews Miller, King's Royal Rifle Corps
- Temp Quartermaster and Capt. Henry George Miller, Royal Army Medical Corps
- Lt. James Miller, Royal Field Artillery
- Lt. John Drummond Miller, Argyll and Sutherland Highlanders
- Lt. William Adam Miller, King Edward's Horse
- Lt. Archibald Cecil Mills, Devonshire Royal Garrison Artillery
- Lt. Frederick Mills, Royal Scots, Machine Gun Corps
- Lt. Arthur John Milne, Royal Field Artillery
- Temp Lt. Charles William Milne, Royal Inniskilling Fusiliers
- Temp Capt. Arthur Stanley Mitchell, Royal Engineers
- 2nd Lt. Leonard Hewitt Mitchell, Royal Garrison Artillery
- Temp Capt. Ernest Bell Mollett, Middlesex Regiment
- Lt. Walter Turner Monckton, Royal West Kent Regiment
- Capt. David Frederick Money, London Regiment
- Lt. Hugh Edmund Langton Montgomery, North Irish Horse
- Capt. George Moody, Lincolnshire Regiment, attd. Machine Gun Corps
- Lt. Juan Christian Moolman, Royal Field Artillery
- Lt. Basil Gates Moore, Royal Field Artillery
- 2nd Lt. Ernest John Moore, Royal Garrison Artillery
- Capt. Frank Leslie Morgan, Royal Warwickshire Regiment, attd. North Lancashire Regiment
- Lt. George Brown Morgan, Royal Garrison Artillery
- Lt. George Roderick Morgan, Royal Field Artillery
- 2nd Lt. Thomas Morgan, Royal Garrison Artillery
- Temp Lt. Thomas William Morgan, Royal Field Artillery
- Lt. Walter Vyvyan Lewis Morgan, Glamorgan Royal Garrison Artillery
- Temp Lt. John Edward Modey, Essex Regiment
- Temp 2nd Lt. Harold Arthur Morris, Royal Engineers
- Lt. Walter Frederick Morris, Norfolk Regiment
- Lt. Hubert Peter Morrison, Royal Field Artillery
- Temp Lt. Stanley Fremantle Mort, Royal Engineers
- Temp Capt. Wilfred Rowland Mount, Royal Engineers
- Temp Lt. Erie Mackenzie Muncaster, Royal Engineers
- Lt. Geoffrey Reginald Gilchrist Mure, Royal Horse Artillery
- Lt. William Sydney Murland, 10th Hussars
- Sergeant Maj. Albert James Murphy, Shropshire Light Infantry
- Lt. Patrick Murphy, Royal Irish Rifles
- Lt. John Kidson Darby Musgrave, Royal Garrison Artillery
- Lt. Patrick Ernest Neale, 2nd King Edward's Horse, attd. Machine Gun Corps
- Temp 2nd Lt. Robert Nedll, Royal Army Service Corps
- Lt. Harold George Nelson, Royal Garrison Artillery
- Lt. Horace Claude Charles Newnham, Hampshire Regiment
- Temp Capt. Cyril Mainwaring Newman, Lancashire Fusiliers
- Lt. Frederick William Herbert Nicholas, Bedfordshire Regiment
- Lt. Jonas Edward Nichols, Royal Field Artillery
- Lt. Humphrey John Nicholson, 6th Dragoons
- 2nd Lt. Ernest Alfred North DCM Lancashire Fusiliers
- Temp Lt. John Thomas Nuttall, Northumberland Fusiliers attd. Bedfordshire Regiment
- Temp Capt. Charles Eric Gillespie Nye, Royal Engineers
- Lt. Cyril Carrington O'Connor, Royal Garrison Artillery
- Temp Capt. John Frederick Odell, Royal Engineers
- Quartermaster and Capt. Edward O'Hanlon, Wiltshire Regiment
- 2nd Lt. William Robert Ollis, North Staffordshire Regiment
- Temp Capt. Daniel MacLennan Oman, Highland Light Infantry
- 2nd Lt. Edward James Hobbs Orchard, Lancashire Fusiliers
- Temp Lt. Frank Edward Orchard, Duke of Cornwall's Light Infantry
- Lt. Simon-Dodd Ord, Essex Regiment
- Lt. Herbert Orton, Royal Field Artillery
- Lt. Richard Bourke Osborne, Grenadier Guards
- Rev. Robert Vincent O'Shaughnessey, Royal Army Chaplains' Department
- Capt. O'Donnell O'Sullivan Royal Army Medical Corps, attd. Royal Warwickshire Regiment
- Temp Capt. Stuart Oswald
- Company Lt. Samuel Harrison Yardley Oulsnam, Royal Garrison Artillery
- Lt. Arthur Reginald Page, Royal Engineers
- Temp Capt. Humphrey Paget, North Lancashire Regiment
- Lt. George Macaulay Painter, Suffolk Regiment, attd. Royal Engineers
- 2nd Lt. Frank William Paley DCM MM King's Royal Rifle Corps
- Lt. Cyril Palmer, Essex Regiment, attd. Machine Gun Corps
- Lt. Charles Edward Parker, Shropshire Light Infantry
- Lt. Alexander Paterson, London Regiment
- Temp Capt. William Lyle Paterson, Royal Army Medical Corps, attd. Royal Garrison Artillery
- Capt. George Archibald Mackay Paxton, Essex Regiment
- Lt. Henry Tayne, Royal Artillery
- Lt. John Raphael Peacey, Royal Garrison Artillery
- Lt. Walter Peake, East Kent Regiment
- Temp Lt.William Henry Pearce, Royal Engineers
- Temp Capt. Norman Robertson Pearson, Rifle Brigade
- Temp Lt. William Pearson, Royal Irish Rifles
- Lt. Edward Walter Peate, Royal Welsh Fusiliers
- George Hugh Peckham, West Kent Yeomanry, attd. East Kent Regiment
- Lt. Alfred Peirce, Royal Garrison Artillery
- Lt. George Owen Peirce, Royal Field Artillery
- Temp Lt. George Pellew, Royal Engineers
- Lt. Geoffrey Harris Pemberton DSO Lancashire Fusiliers
- Lt. George Brooks Penfold, Royal Field Artillery
- Temp Capt. William Maxwell Penny Royal Army Medical Corps
- Lt., Edward Guy Pentreath, Royal Garrison Artillery
- Quartermaster and Capt. Henry Joseph Percy DCM East Surrey Regiment, attd. Royal Fusiliers
- Temp 2nd Lt. Isidoro Edmund Perez, Royal Engineers
- Capt. Robey Thorpe Perry, Royal Guernsey Artillery
- Lt. James Alexander Philips, Monmouthshire Regiment
- Lt. i Thirlwell Philipson, Guards Machine Gun Regiment
- Temp Lt. William Henry Phillips, Welsh Regiment
- Temp Capt. Robert Wilson Picken, Royal Engineers
- George Wimble Picot, Wiltshire Regiment
- Lt. Arthur Vincent Piggott, 2nd King Edward's Horse
- Temp Lt. Bevis Platt, Royal Engineers, attd. Royal Garrison Artillery
- Lt. Benjamin Douglas Plummet, Northumberland Fusiliers, secd. Royal Engineers
- Lt. Sydney Richard Pooock, Leinster Regiment, attd. Machine Gun Corps
- Temp Lt. Geoffrey Kemp Podd, Royal Engineers
- Lt. Herbert Pomeroy, Cheshire Regiment, attd. Labour Corps
- Temp Lt. Robert Arthur Pomeroy, Labour Corps
- Lt. Stephen Einar Gilbert Ponder, Royal Garrison Artillery
- Lt. Edward Poole, City of London Yeomanry
- Temp Lt. Edward Poole, Rifle Brigade, attd. London Regiment
- Temp 2nd Lt. George Williams Poole, South Staffordshire Regiment
- Quartermaster and Lt. Benjamin Pooley, Cambridgeshire Regiment
- 2nd Lt. Eliot Porter, Royal Field Artillery, Special Reserve
- Lt. Joseph Pearson Postlethwaite, Royal Garrison Artillery
- Lt. Harold Joseph Potts, London Regiment
- Temp Capt. Thomas Pratt, West Yorkshire Regiment
- Lt. Lawrance Caleb Pressland, Royal Garrison Artillery
- Lt. Hugh Oliver Pring, Somerset Light Infantry
- Lt. William Conradi Watt Pringle, Royal Field Artillery
- Capt. Maurice Arthur Prismall, London Regiment
- Lt. Inyr Roger Hilton Carwardine Probert, Royal Horse Artillery
- Lt. Lancelot Eric Alan Prothero, East Kent Regiment
- Lt. William Provost, Oxfordshire and Buckinghamshire Light Infantry
- Capt. Edward Francis Mortimer Puxon, Nottinghamshire Yeomanry, attd. Nottinghamshire and Derbyshire Regiment
- Lt. Herbert Garnet Wakeley Pye, Royal Field Artillery
- Lt. John Pyle, Highland Light Infantry, and Machine Gun Corps
- Sergeant Maj. Byron Edward Rabjohn, 20th Hussars
- Lt. Victor Harry Raby, attd. London Regiment
- Lt. Demetrius Ractivand, Shropshire Light Infantry
- Lt. John Rae, Royal Engineers
- Rev. David Randell, Royal Army Chaplains' Department, attd. Essex Regiment
- Lt. Victor Rathbone, King Edward's Horse
- Temp 2nd Lt. John Rawle, Middlesex Regiment
- Sergeant Maj. John Rawlinson, 17th Lancers
- Temp Capt. James Forrest Alexander Readman, Royal Engineers
- Lt. Herbert William Reah, Royal Engineers
- Lt. Wilfred Deuchar Reed, Royal Field Artillery
- Lt. Emrys Francis Rees, Royal Field Artillery
- Lt. Sidney Ernest Reeve, Royal Field Artillery
- Temp Capt. Francis Warrack Reid, Highland Light Infantry
- Capt. Leslie Cartwright Reid, Royal Engineers
- Lt. Edward Frank Rendell, Royal Engineers
- Temp Lt. Lancelot Edward Joshua Reynolds, Royal Engineers
- 2nd Lt. Vernon Frank Rhodes, Royal Field Artillery
- Lt. Cecil Edwin Rice, Middlesex Regiment
- Capt. Henry James Rice Royal Army Medical Corps, attd. Liverpool Regiment
- Quartermaster and Capt. George Richards, King's Royal Rifle Corps, attd. London Regiment
- Lt. Robert Laddie Thomson Richardson, Royal Scots
- Lt. Roland Edward Acril Richardson, Royal Garrison Artillery
- Lt. Alexander Herbert Oliver Riddell, Bedfordshire Regiment
- Lt. Fergus Harold Ridge, Royal Engineers
- Lt. George Thomas Ridge, Somerset Light Infantry
- Lt. John Douglas Ritchie, Gordon Highlanders
- 2nd Lt. Frederick William Rivett, Royal Garrison Artillery
- Quartermaster and Capt. William Herbert Roberton, Durham Light Infantry
- Lt., Edmund George Roberts, Royal Garrison Artillery
- Lt. Owen Fiennes Temple Roberts, Royal Garrison Artillery
- Capt. Reginald Geoffrey Roberts, 7th Dragoon Guards
- Lt. Ian Sterphen Robertson, Seaforth Highlanders
- Temp Capt. James Dewar Robertson Royal Army Medical Corps, attd. Machine Gun Corps
- Temp Capt. George Denis Burke Roche
- Lt. Henry Colenso Hodda, Royal Engineers
- Capt. Hubert Rodwell, Royal Army Service Corps
- Lt. Hender Molesworth Rogers, Shropshire Light Infantry
- Temp Lt. Lionel Rogers Durham Light Infantry
- Lt. Claude Cecil Rose, London Regiment, secd. Machine Gun Co
- Temp Capt. Leonard Roseveare, Royal Garrison Artillery
- Capt. Charles Gordon Ross, London Regiment
- Lt. James Frederick Stanley Ross, Royal Engineers
- Temp Lt. James MacLarern Ross, Royal Engineers
- Temp Lt. John Mowat Ross, Army Cyclist Corps
- Temp Capt. Eric Walkden Rostern, Royal Engineers
- Lt. Edgar Rotheray, Royal Field Artillery
- Lt. Robert Row, Royal Engineers
- Temp Lt. Herbert Vincent Rowlands Royal Field Artillery
- Temp Lt., Eric Royston, Royal Fusiliers
- Lt. Leonard Merrick Budge, Worcestershire Regiment, attd. Royal Welsh Fusiliers
- Lt. George Archer Busk, Royal Highlanders
- Temp Capt. Alexander Russell, Royal Garrison Artillery
- Temp Capt. John Kingsley Butter, Labour Corps
- Temp Capt. George Ryder, Royal Engineers
- Temp Lt. Charles Douglas St. Leger, Machine Gun Corps
- Temp Capt. diaries Sadler, Manchester Regiment
- Lt. Cyril Sebastian Salmon, Royal Irish Rifles, and Machine Gun Corps
- Lt. Leonard James William Salmon, Suffolk Regiment
- Lt. Edward Joseph Saltwell, Royal Field Artillery
- Temp Capt. Arthur Hamilton Sampson, West Yorkshire Regiment
- Lt. Eric Henry Lancelot-Sander, Middlesex Regiment
- Capt. Benjamin John Meadows Sanders, Royal Garrison Artillery
- Capt. John Forbes William Sandison Royal Army Medical Corps
- Temp Capt. Douglas Mill-Saunders, Bedfordshire Regiment
- Lt. Kenneth Phillips Sawyer, Royal Field Artillery, attd. Royal Engineers
- Lt. Harold Selwood Sawyer, South Lancashire Regiment
- Temp Capt. Charles Edell Scott, King's Royal Rifle Corps
- Lt. Duncan Scott, Royal Garrison Artillery
- Capt. Francis Gerald Scott, Royal Field Artillery
- Temp Lt., Robert Francis Cloete Scott, Lincolnshire Regiment
- Capt. Sidney Scott Royal Army Medical Corps
- Lt. William Arthur Searle DCM Royal Field Artillery
- Rev. Walter Sellers, Royal Army Chaplains' Department, attd Shropshire Light Infantry
- Lt. Stanley Augustus Seys, London Regiment
- Temp Lt. Alan James Shanks, Machine Gun Corps
- Lt. Alexander Shanks, Argyll and Sutherland Highlanders, attd. Machine Gun Corps
- Lt. Ronald Shapley, London Regiment
- Capt. Philip Henry Sharpe, Royal Engineers
- Capt. James Norrie Shaw, Royal Scots
- Temp Surgeon-Lt. Reginald Kenworthy Shaw RN
- Lt. John Frederick Sheppard, Royal Field Artillery
- Temp Lt. Gerald Ormsby Sherrard, Royal Garrison Artillery
- Lt. Edmund Alfred Shipton, Cambridgeshire Regiment, attd. Royal Engineers
- Lt. Cecil Douglas Shott, 2nd City of London Yeomanry, attd. Tank Corps
- 2nd Lt. Charles Ashley Shute DCM York and Lancaster Regiment
- Capt. William Richard Shutt, Royal Warwickshire Regiment
- Capt. Ernest Frederick Malcolm Sim, Welsh Regiment
- Temp Lt. Leonard Stephen Barrington Simeon, Royal Fusiliers
- Capt. Frank Keith Simmons MVO Highland Light Infantry
- Company Sergeant Maj. Hubert George Simons DCM Coldstream Guards
- Temp Lt. Louis Arthur Skinner, Royal Engineers
- Temp Lt. Percy Edward Slingo, Royal Engineers
- Temp 2h d Lt. Alexander Small, Rifle Brigade
- Capt. Richard Reginald Smart, North Irish Horse
- Lt. Charles Smith, Cheshire Regiment
- Temp 2nd Lt. George Alfred Smith, Tank Corps
- Temp Lt. Harrison Churchill Smith, Royal Marine Light Infantry
- Temp Lt. Norman Smith, Royal Engineers
- Temp Lt. Robert Smith, Seaforth Highlanders
- Capt. Thomas Cairns Smith, Scottish Rifles
- Lt. William Leslie Winslow Smith, Royal Garrison Artillery
- Temp Lt. Philip Harry Solomon, Royal Field Artillery
- Lt. Raymond Thomas Somerville, Royal Lancaster Regiment
- Lt. Charles Archibald Philip Southwell, Royal Garrison Artillery
- Temp Lt. Edgar Ford, Spears, Royal Engineers
- Temp Capt. Arthur Herbert Spicer Royal Army Medical Corps
- Lt. John James Hofer Spink, Royal Garrison Artillery
- Lt. John Chailes Garth Spooner, Royal Field Artillery
- 2nd Lt. Leonard Spragg, Royal Garrison Artillery
- Lt. JamesBaker Sproston, Royal Garrison Artillery
- Lt. Arthur Stab, Royal Field Artillery
- Lt. Percy Scott Stanbury, Northamptonshire Regiment
- Lt. Edward James Standen, Lancashire Fusiliers
- Lt. John Keith Stanford, Suffolk Regiment
- Lt. Ronald Thomas Stanyforth, 17th Lancers
- Lt. Walter Bayntun Starkey, North Somerset Yeomanry
- Lt. John Morley Stebbings, Royal Field Artillery
- Temp Capt. Frank Dunbar Steen, King's Royal Rifle Corps
- Temp Capt. Frederick Geoffrey Roger Byng Stephens, Rifle Brigade
- Lt. Warren Trestrail Stephens, Nottinghamshire and Derbyshire Regiment
- Temp Lt. Arthur David Stephenson
- Lt. Douglas Carter Stern, Royal West Kent Regiment, attd. 1st Battalion
- Temp Capt. Rupert Donald Steward, Royal Field Artillery
- Lt. Alexander Bremner Stewart, Royal Scots
- Lt. James Allan St. Clair Stewart, Royal Field Artillery
- Lt. William Hinton Stewart, Royal Garrison Artillery
- Lt. Thomas Cyril Stirrup, York and Lancaster Regiment
- Temp Capt. George Fuller Stone, Worcestershire Regiment
- Capt. William Arthur Stone, Honourable Artillery Company
- Lt. Frederick Stanley Straight, Oxfordshire and Buckinghamshire Light Infantry, secd. Royal Engineers
- Capt. Gilbert Streeten, Royal Engineers, attd. Royal Engineers
- Lt. Alexander Fulton Struthers, Scottish Rifles
- Lt. George Murrell Stuart, Norfolk Regiment
- Lt. Thomas Fisher Stubington, Royal Field Artillery
- Lt. Thomas Sturrock, Royal Field Artillery
- Capt. William Ridley Styles, 12th Lancers, attd. Machine Gun Corps
- 2nd Lt. Louis Frederick Summerfield, Royal Garrison Artillery
- Lt. Francis Ian Sinclair Sutherland, Royal Scots
- Lt. William Sutton, Durham Light Infantry, attd. Tank Corps
- Lt. David Richard Swaine, Royal Garrison Artillery
- Temp Lt. Charles Francis Swann, Machine Gun Corps
- Lt. Arthur Clifford Swift, Royal Garrison Artillery
- Sergeant Maj. Ernest Tabb DCM Devonshire Regiment
- 2nd Lt. Charles David Tabor MM Royal Garrison Artillery
- Temp Lt. John Scott Taggart, Royal Engineers
- Temp Lt. Horace William Tamblyn, Royal Engineers
- Temp Lt. George Aubrey Taplin, Royal Garrison Artillery
- Temp Lt. James Tarbit, King's Royal Rifle Corps, attd. Somerset Light Infantry
- Temp Lt. Arthur Charles Tarbutt, Royal Highlanders
- Capt. Andrew Buxton Tawse, Royal Highlanders, secd. Tank Corps
- Temp Lt. Albert Jenkins Taylor, Royal Engineers
- Lt. Harold Taylor, Royal Engineers
- Temp Capt. Montagu Wilbraham Taylor, East Surrey Regiment
- Lt. Robert Allan Grant Taylor, Royal Scots Fusiliers
- Capt. Stanley Taylor, Royal Field Artillery
- Temp Lt. Sydney George Taylor, Royal Field Artillery
- Quartermaster and Capt. William John Thexton, Welsh Regiment
- Capt. Frederick Dunbar Thomas, Royal Field Artillery
- Lt. Harold Thomas, South Staffordshire Regiment
- 2nd Lt. Gerald William Thompson, Royal Garrison Artillery
- 2nd Lt. Horace Albert Thompson DCM Royal Field Artillery
- Temp Capt. Robert Howie Thomson, Royal Army Medical Corps
- Lt. Edmund Basil Thornhill, Royal Field Artillery
- Temp 2nd Lt.Thomas William Thurley, Manchester Regiment
- Temp Lt. Alfred Cecil Timms, Essex Regiment
- Lt. Montague William Tipler, Northamptonshire Regiment
- Lt. George Herbert Norris Todd, Royal Horse Artillery
- Company Sergeant Maj. John Charles Toogood, Royal Scots Fusiliers
- Lt. John Lock Totterdell, 6th Dragoons, attd. Royal Engineers
- Lt. George Cokt Totton, Northamptonshire Regiment
- Temp Capt. Eric Morse Townsend, Royal Army Medical Corps
- Lt. Bernard David Tracy, Royal Garrison Artillery
- Temp Capt. John Cumberland Landalfl Train, Royal Engineers
- Lt. Temp Capt. Denys Robert Trefusis, Royal Horse Guards
- Temp 2nd Lt. Bernard Gaines Trevor, West Yorkshire Regiment, attd. King's Own Yorkshire Light Infantry
- Lt. Wenzel Alfred Tuczek, Essex Yeomanry
- Temp Capt. Henry William Turner, Royal Army Medical Corps
- Capt. William Howell Turner, Royal Field Artillery
- 2nd Lt. George Alec Turney, Royal Field Artillery
- Temp Lt. Fred Tye, Middlesex Regiment
- Temp Capt. Vyvian Alfred Tylor, Machine Gun Corps
- Temp 2nd Lt. Harold Alsonso Underhill, Royal Engineers
- Lt. Reginald Harry Unwin, Royal Field Artillery
- Temp Lt. Claude Cecil Valder, Royal Engineers
- Lt. Ronald Visto Alexander Valentine, London Regiment
- Lt. Ferdinand Jules Vambeck, South Irish Horse, attd. Army Cyclist Corps
- Temp Lt. Henry Monckton Vatcher, Royal Engineers
- Lt. Edward Ventham DCM Royal Garrison Artillery
- Lt. Arthur Wadsworth, Middlesex Regiment
- Lt. Charles Elvey Waite, Royal West Kent Regiment, attd. West Yorkshire Regiment
- Temp Capt. Alfred Stewart Wakely, Royal Army Medical Corps
- Capt. Cecil Edward Walker, Royal Garrison Artillery
- Lt. Edward Walker, Royal Field Artillery
- Lt. Berthon Ellerslie Wallace, Royal Garrison Artillery
- Lt. John Charles Walton, Royal Garrison Artillery
- Lt. Richard Warburton, Fife and Forfar Yeomanry, secd. Tank Corps
- Lt. Francis Ward, Scots Guards
- Temp Lt. Henry Wardall, Essex Regiment
- 2nd Lt. Thomas Zacharias Waters, Royal Garrison Artillery
- Lt. James Anderson Scott Watson, Royal Field Artillery
- Temp Lt. Norman Watson, Northumberland Fusiliers
- Temp Capt. Cecil Victor Wattenbach, Royal Fusiliers
- Capt. John Oscar Donald Way, R. Anglesey, Royal Engineers
- Lt. Charles George Frederick Webb, Royal Artillery
- Temp Capt. Stanley Augustus Webb, Royal Field Artillery
- Lt. William Sidney Webster, Royal Field Artillery
- Capt. Cecil McAlpine Weir, 7th Scottish Rifles, attd. Tank Corps
- Temp Lt. Frank West, Devonshire Regiment
- Lt. Frederick Sackville West, Royal Field Artillery, attd. Royal Engineers
- Lt. Victor Reginald Westcott, Shropshire Light Infantry
- Lt. Reginald White, Lincolnshire Regiment
- Temp Capt. Richard Alfred Victor White, attd. Lancashire Fusiliers
- 2nd Lt. Jack Whitelock, East Yorkshire Regiment, attd. Lancashire Fusiliers
- Temp Lt. Edward Whitley-Baker, Royal Engineers
- Lt. George Whittle, Highland Light Infantry
- Temp Capt. Francis Wilding, Royal Army Service Corps, attd. Tank Corps
- Temp Lt. James Wilkie, North Lancashire Regiment, attd. East Lancashire Regiment
- Temp Quartermaster and Lt. Harry Wilkinson, Durham Light Infantry
- Lt. Charles Gordon Williams, South Lancashire Regiment, secd. Royal Engineers
- Lt. Frederick John Williams, Royal Inniskilling Fusiliers
- Temp Lt. Henry Ronald Williams, Royal Field Artillery
- Temp Lt. John Ernest Williams, Royal Welsh Fusiliers
- Lt. Leslie Graeme Williams, Royal Garrison Artillery
- Temp 2nd Lt. Thomas Williams, Welsh Regiment
- Lt. George Harold Williamson, Nottinghamshire and Derbyshire Regiment
- Capt. George Scott Williamson, Royal Army Medical Corps
- Lt. Welburn Harry Williamson, Royal Field Artillery
- Temp Lt. Raymond Wilmot, Royal Field Artillery
- 2nd Lt. Andrew Alexander Wilson, Cameron Highlanders
- Lt. Charles Morell Wilson, Royal Army Ordnance Corps
- Lt. Harold Edward Wilson, Liverpool Regiment
- Capt. Tom Drummond Wilson, Royal Scots
- Lt. Rudolph Winter, Royal Garrison Artillery
- Temp 2nd Lt. Albert Witham, Welsh Regiment
- Quartermaster and Capt. Joseph Withers DCM Leicestershire Regiment
- Lt. John Calder Wood, Gordon Highlanders, attd. Royal Engineers
- Lt. John Morton Devereux Wood, Royal Field Artillery
- Lt. John Noel Wood, Royal Field Artillery
- Lt. John Paterson Wood, Scottish Rifles, attd. South Staffordshire Regiment
- Lt. William Stanley Wood, Royal Garrison Artillery
- 2nd Lt. AlbertEdward Woods, Northumberland Fusiliers
- Lt. Leslie Woods, Royal Field Artillery
- Capt. Geoffrey Harold Woolley VC London Regiment
- Lt. Christopher Pemberton Worsfold, Royal Engineers
- Lt. Charles Wright, Royal Field Artillery
- Rev. Norman-Macleod Wright, Royal Army Chaplains' Department
- Lt. Thomas Lawrence Wright, Royal Garrison Artillery
- Temp 2nd Lt. Walter-Anthony Wright, Machine Gun Corps
- Lt. Geoffrey Noel Wykes, Leicestershire Regiment
- Capt. Hon Everard Humphrey Wyndham, Guards, Machine Gun Regiment
- Temp 2nd Lt. Frank Louis Youles, Labour Corps
- Temp Lt. George Young, Machine Gun Corps
- Lt. Gordon, Drummond Young, Royal Army Service Corps, attd. Royal Garrison Artillery
- The Rev. William Paulin Young DCM Royal Army Chaplains' Department
- Lt. Guy Bertram Yoxall, West Yorkshire Regiment
- Temp Lt. Esme George Yung-Bateman, Royal Field Artillery

Canadian Forces

- Capt. Arthur Claude Henry Andrews, Central Ontario Regiment
- Rev. Hon Capt. William Robert Ramsay Armitage, Canadian Chaplains' Service
- Capt. Arthur Baird, Canadian Engineers
- Lt. William Louis Barrett-Lennard, Nova Scotia Regiment
- Capt. Thomas Douglas Bennett, Canadian Army Medical Corps
- Lt. Edward Alexander Bird, Canadian Garrison Artillery
- Capt. John Black, Quebec Regiment
- Capt. George Warsop Griffiths Booker, Canadian Engineers
- Lt. John Lawther Bryant, Canadian Engineers
- Lt. Charles H. Bunoe, British Columbia Regiment
- Capt. James Burgoyne, Saskatchewan Regiment
- Temp Capt. Frank Warren Burnham, Canadian Machine Gun Corps
- Capt. Leslie Godwin Chance, Saskatchewan Regiment
- Capt. Bernard Dysart Coombes, Manitoba Regiment
- Lt. William John Cowan, Saskatchewan Regiment
- Capt. Edward Herbert Daniel, British Columbia Regiment
- Temp Lt. Vernon Russell Davies, Canadian Machine Gun Corps
- Battery Sergeant Maj. Frank Elmer Dobson, Canadian Field Artillery
- Capt. Hugh Percival Adams Edge, Central Ontario Regiment
- Lt. Edwin Ronald Evans, Canadian Field Artillery
- Temp Lt. Ralph Lindsay Feurt, Alberta Regiment
- Lt. Robertson Fleet, Canadian Field Artillery
- Capt. Walter Ross Flewin, British Columbia Regiment
- Sergeant Maj. Frederick Gillingham DCM Princess Patricia's Canadian Light Infantry, Eastern Ontario Regiment
- Quartermaster and Hon Capt. Arthur Grindell, British Columbia Regiment
- Lt. David Adams Guildford, Canadian Garrison Artillery
- Capt. Hector Clayton Hall, Canadian Army Medical Corps
- Capt. Harry Ellis Hanwell, Canadian Railway Troops
- Lt. Charles Ernest Henderson, Central Ontario Regiment
- Capt. Harry Edwin Henderson, Canadian Machine Gun Corps
- Lt. Harold Yeldersley Hicking, Saskatchewan Regiment
- Lt. George Tweedie Inch, Canadian Field Artillery
- Capt. George Irving, Fort Garry Horse
- Lt. Glenn Harlan Keeler, Nova Scotia Regiment
- Capt. John Kirkcaldy, Canadian Field Artillery
- Lt. Herbert Cridge Laundy MM Canadian Field Artillery
- Capt. Stanley Alfred Lee, Fort Garry Horsey
- Capt. Norman Lisle Le Sueur, Quebec Regiment
- Lt. John Patrick MacCormac, Canadian Garrison Artillery
- Lt. Donald McGillivray, Canadian Machine Gun Corps
- Lt. Ellice Allan MacKenzie, Canadian Garrison Artillery
- Capt. Allister Thompson MacLean, Canadian Engineers
- Capt. Stanley Grover McSpadden, British Columbia Regiment
- Capt. Irvine Meredith Marshall, Canadian Engineers
- Capt. John Campbell Matheson, Alberta Regiment
- Lt. Chester Henry Mathewson, Canadian Field Artillery
- Capt. George Hamilton May, Canadian Army Service Corps
- Capt. William Taylor May, Canadian Engineers
- Lt. Arnott James Minnes, Canadian Field Artillery
- Quartermaster and Hon Capt. Henry George Monger, Saskatchewan Regiment
- Lt. Julian Impey Monteith, Central Ontario Regiment
- Lt. Robert Arthur Seymour Nash, Canadian Field Artillery
- Sergeant Maj. Ernest Nicholls DCM Eastern Ontario Regiment
- Capt. Roy Nordheimer, Royal Canadian Dragoons
- Lt. James O'Reilly, Canadian Div. Artillery
- Sergeant Maj. James Page DCM Quebec Regiment
- Temp Capt. Alfred Glynn Pearson DCM Princess Patricia's Canadian Light Infantry, Eastern Ontario Regiment
- Capt. Francis Cyril Powell DCM Lord Strathcona's Horse
- Capt. Frank Scammell, Central Ontario Regiment
- Temp Capt. Almon Wilmot Scott, Alberta Regiment
- Lt. Arthur Frederick Shaw, Canadian Engineers
- Capt. Jesse Skinner, Canadian Machine Gun Corps
- Capt. Percy Nash Amati Smith, Western Ontario Regiment
- Capt. William Clegg Smith, Canadian Cyclist Battalion
- Lt. James Matthias Snetsinger, Canadian Machine Gun Corps
- Sergeant Maj. Sverre Sorenson, Canadian Field Artillery
- Lt. Vernon Robert Spearing, Quebec Regiment
- Lt. William Errol Boyd Starr, Canadian Garrison Artillery
- Lt. Ray Alden Stewart, Quebec Regiment
- Lt. Walter Margrave Taylor, Canadian Field Artillery
- Capt. Philip Charles Tidy, C.M.R., Central Ontario Regiment
- Capt. William Stephen Trenholme, Canadian Garrison Artillery
- Capt. Ambert Hastie Veitch, Canadian Army Medical Corps
- Lt. Richard Clampitt Vooght, Canadian Field Artillery
- Lt. Clarence Victor Warner, New Brunswick Regiment
- Lt. Frederick Herbert Wheatley MM Canadian Machine Gun Corps
- Lt. David Wilson, British Columbia Regiment
- Capt. Robert Harold Wilson, Central Ontario Regiment
- Capt. John Addie Wotherspoon, Saskatchewan Regiment
- Lt. Charles Alexander Young, Canadian Machine Gun Corps

Australian Imperial Forces

- Capt. Rupert Reid Agnew, Australian Infantry
- Lt. Charles Reddie Allanson, Australian Infantry
- Lt. Richard Vallance Andrewartha, Australian Infantry
- Lt. John Robert Baird, Australian Infantry
- Lt. Percy Ambrose Ballard, Australian Infantry
- Lt. John AlfredBartels, Australian Infantry
- Lt. Arthur James Beck, Australian Infantry
- Capt. Diavid Henry Bodycomb, Australian Army Medical Corps
- Capt. John Carlisle Bootle, Australian Infantry
- Capt. James Pascoe Caddy, Australia Engineers
- Lt. Donald Cameron, Australian Infantry
- Lt. Thomas Wilson Cameron, Australian Infantry
- Capt. Allan Campbell, Australian Infantry
- Capt. Archie Sheridan Cockburn, Australian Army Medical Corps
- Capt. Henry Samuel Cope, Australian Infantry
- Lt. Charles Thomas Crispe, Australian Infantry
- Lt. Norman Wilson Cuzens, Australian Infantry
- Lt. Frederick James Deacon, Australia Engineers
- Lt. George Frederick Seyler Donaldson, Australia Engineers
- Lt. Harry Downes MM Australian Infantry
- Lt. Charles Robert Duke, Australian Infantry
- Capt. Gordon Allan Dunbar, Australian Infantry
- Lt. Frank Victor Whitefoot Duncan MM 2nd Australia Machine Gun Battalion
- Capt. Stanley William Evers, Australian Infantry
- Lt. Augustus Clive Berkeley Fitzhardinge, Australian Infantry
- Capt. Daniel Arthur Fowler, Australian Field Artillery
- Capt. Alexander John Fullerton-Andrew, Australian Field Artillery
- Lt. Charles Wynyard Game, Australian Infantry
- Capt. Robert Austen Goldrick, Australian Infantry
- Lt. James Taylor Gray, Australia Engineers
- Lt. William Harvey, Australian Infantry
- Lt. William Warren Bowman Hogarth, Australian Field Artillery
- Lt. John Dennison Howell, Australian Infantry
- Lt. William Jackson, Australian Infantry
- Lt. Nigel Travers Kingsmill, Australian Field Artillery
- Lt. Frederick William MacGibbon, Australian Infantry
- Lt. Charles Roy MacKenzie, Australia Engineers, attd Royal Engineers
- Sergeant Maj. Hugh Mackenzie, Australian Infantry
- Lt. Robert Walter Marriott, Australia Army Service Corps
- Quartermaster and Capt. William May, Australian Infantry
- Lt. William Douglas McDermid, A.M.G. Battalion
- Lt. Clarence Frederick McDougall, Australian Infantry
- Lt. Donald Lincoln McKenzie, Australian Infantry
- Capt. Valentine Meates, Australian Field Artillery
- Capt. Leslie George Merkel, 5th Australia Divisional Engineers
- Lt. George Hedley Miller, 13th Australian Field Artillery Brigade
- Lt. Harald Miller, Australian Infantry
- Capt. Throsby Morell, Australian Field Artillery
- Lt. Francis Arnold Moseley, Australian Imperial Force
- Lt. Frank Peter Mountjoy, Australian Field Artillery
- Capt. Frederick William Newth, Australian Infantry
- Lt. Bryan Desmond O'Neil, Australian Field Artillery
- Lt. Arthur Richard Pegler, Australian Machine Gun Battalion
- Capt. Frederick George Phippard, Australia Engineers
- Lt. Tom Malcolm Price, Australian Engineers
- Lt. Herbert Guy Raymond, Australian Field Artillery
- Lt. Oswald Garnet Reynolds, Australian Infantry
- Lt. Lubin James Robertson, Australia Infantry
- Lt. John Salter, Australian Infantry
- Capt. Cyril Douglas Savage, Australian Infantry
- Lt. Lancelot Beck Smith, Australian Infantry
- Lt. Vernon Harcourt Henry Smith, Australian Machine Gun Battalion
- Capt. Frank Noel Snow, Australian Field Artillery
- Lt. Thomas Hamlet Taylor, Australian Infantry
- Lt. Edwin Marsden Tooth, Australian Engineers
- Lt. Percy Elgar Wand, Australian Engineers
- Lt. Leslie Edward Watson, Australian Machine Gun Battalion
- Lt. Anthony Claud Woolrych, Australian Imperial Force
- Lt. Oscar Charles Zehnder, Australian Field Artillery

New Zealand Forces

- Lt. John Sinclair Chisholm, Canterbury Regiment
- 2nd Lt. Philip Sidney Cousins, Auckland Regiment
- Lt. Malcolm Keith Draffin, NZ Engineers
- Capt. William Ellis Earnshaw, NZ Field Artillery
- Lt. Edgar Beilby Edwards, NZ Rifle Brigade
- Lt. James Walt Fraser, Canterbury Regiment
- Capt. George Walter Horn, NZ Machine Gun
- 2nd Lt. Hohepa Jacob, NZ Maori Battalion
- Lt. Gordon Cosgrove Laws, Wellington Regiment
- Lt. Nairn Victor Le Petit, Auckland Regiment, attd. NZ Infantry Brigade
- Lt. Kenneth John Mackenzie, Otago Regiment
- Lt. Ernest Marsden, NZ Engineers, attd. Royal Engineers
- Lt. Valentine Marshall, NZ Rifle Brigade
- 2nd Lt. Ernest Sydney Mayn, Otago Regiment
- Lt. William Stewart Rae, NZ Engineers

South African Forces

- Lt. Harry Bailey, SA Heavy Artillery
- Lt. Alfred Scott Crooks, SA Infantry
- Temp Lt. John Thorburn Humphrey, SA Infantry
- Lt. Ernest Arthur John Maddison, SA Heavy Artillery
- Temp Lt. Frank Whitmore Mellish, SA Horse Artillery
- Sergeant Maj. George Meredith, SA Infantry
- Temp Lt. Arthur Hirst Rushforth, SA Horse Artillery
- Temp Capt. Walter Eric Thomas, Rhodesia Regiment, attd. King's Royal Rifle Corps
- Lt. Herbert William Unwin, SA Horse Artillery

Newfoundland Forces

- Temp Lt. Robert Allan Postlethwaite, Royal Newfoundland Regiment
- Temp Capt. James Robins Stick, Royal Newfoundland Regiment
- Temp Lt. Frederick Walter Waterman, Royal Newfoundland Regiment

=== Italy ===
For distinguished service in connection with military operations in Italy —

- Temp Capt. Frederick Leonard Allan, Northumberland Fusiliers
- Temp Lt. Frank Argles, Border Regiment
- Capt. Laurence Ball Royal Army Medical Corps, Royal Berkshire Regiment
- Lt. Tom Irving Bond, Royal Field Artillery
- Lt. Howard Gilbert Boulton, Worcestershire Regiment
- Lt. Maurice Blumfield Brown, Honourable Artillery Company
- Temp 2nd Lt. Charles William Buckwell, West Yorkshire Regiment
- Lt. Harold Philip Bundy, Worcestershire Regiment
- 2nd Lt. John Ford Bygott, South Staffordshire Regiment
- Temp Capt. Andrew Fulton Calderwood, Durham Light Infantry
- Temp Lt. Cecil Varidepeer Clarke, South Staffordshire Regiment
- Capt. James Bertram Coates, Royal West Surrey Regiment
- Temp 2nd Lt. William Thomson Colville, Durham Light Infantry
- Temp Capt. John Francis Conlin, Royal Field Artillery
- Temp Quartermaster and Capt. Ernest Albert Cooper, West Yorkshire Regiment
- Company Sergeant Maj. John Cooper, Royal Warwickshire Regiment
- Capt. Henry Criswell, Royal Engineers
- Lt. Alexander Pierre Darby, Essex Regiment
- Temp Lt. Leonard Charles Dickens, Yorkshire Regiment
- Lt. Keith Anstruther Duncan, Royal Field Artillery
- Lt. Godfrey Lewis Trevor Eaton, South Staffordshire Regiment
- Lt. James Edward England, Honourable Artillery Company
- Lt. John Wood Fawdry, Royal Warwickshire Regiment
- Lt. John Tabberer Fletcher, Royal Field Artillery
- Company Sergeant Maj. Thomas Edward Fletcher DCM MM Border Regiment
- Lt. Charles Tait Fortune, Royal Engineers
- Lt. John Charles Blagdon Gamlen, Oxfordshire and Buckinghamshire Light Infantry
- Lt. Charles James Gardner, Royal Field Artillery
- 2nd Lt. Sydney Wilson Gardner, York and Lancaster Regiment
- 2nd Lt. George Harold Garton, Royal Warwickshire Regiment
- Lt. William Howard Green, Royal Lancaster Regiment
- Sergeant Maj. Thomas Hannon DCM Royal Welsh Fusiliers
- Lt. Robert Stafford Wrey Harding, Royal Field Artillery
- Lt. Alfred Harrod, Royal Warwickshire Regiment
- Temp 2nd Lt. Lawrence Hart, Yorkshire Regiment
- Lt. Edwin Cowtan Hatton, Royal Welsh Fusiliers
- Lt. James John Gilbert Hay, Gordon Highlanders
- Lt. James Dennis Healey, Lincolnshire Regiment
- Temp Lt. Christopher Douglas Hely-Hutchinson, Royal Artillery
- Temp Capt. Reginald Lockyer Hibberdine, South Staffordshire Regiment
- 2nd Lt. Ernest Edward Howell, Oxfordshire and Buckinghamshire Light Infantry
- Lt. George Joseph Somerset Hubbard, Dorsetshire Regiment
- Temp Lt. David James, Machine Gun Corps
- Lt. David Moy John, Royal Welsh Fusiliers, Special Reserve, attd. 1st Battalion
- Lt. Harry Marshall Keen, Royal Sussex Yeomanry
- Lt. Reginald Kerry, York and Lancaster Regiment
- Lt. Kenneth Charles Warner Lacey, Royal 1st Devonshire Yeomanry
- Capt. Frank Litchfield, Northamptonshire Yeomanry
- Lt. Edward Mack, Essex Regiment, attd. Machine Gun Corps
- Temp Capt. John Burnett Matthews, Royal Army Medical Corps, attd. Oxfordshire and Buckinghamshire Light Infantry
- Temp Capt. James McLean McKnight, Royal Garrison Artillery, Indian Army
- Lt. Alexander Gladstone McTurk OBE 2nd Lovat's Scouts Yeomanry
- Temp 2nd Lt. Ernest Edward Miller, Wiltshire Regiment
- Rev. William Graham Moeran, Royal Army Chaplains' Department
- Temp Lt. Arthur Orwin
- Rev. Walter Mundell Paterson, Royal Army Chaplains' Department, attd. Gordon Highlanders
- Rev. Arthur Gwilym Alfred Picton, Royal Army Chaplains' Department
- Lt. Leiwis Greville Pocock, Royal Field Artillery
- Temp Capt. Lionel John Treleaven Polgreen, Yorkshire Light Infantry
- Lt. William John Hedley Pope, Gloucestershire Regiment
- Temp Lt. James Clifford Ray, Northumberland Fusiliers
- Temp Lt. John Robinson, Machine Gun Corps
- Capt. Donald Gordon Romanis, Royal Garrison Artillery
- 2nd Lt. William Rugman, Royal Warwickshire Regiment
- Lt. Paul James Sainsbury, West Riding Regiment
- Lt. Alfred Julius Sington, Royal Field Artillery
- Capt. Edward Montagu Cavendish, Lord Stanley, Grenadier Guards
- Lt. Max Burgoyne Stone, Gloucestershire Regiment
- Temp 2nd Lt. Edward Sydney, Machine Gun Corps
- Lt. Joseph Tobin, Royal Field Artillery
- Rev. Hugh Wilfrid Todd, Royal Army Chaplains' Department
- Lt. William Arthur Todd, Royal Field Artillery
- Lt. Charles Cogan Usher, King's Own Scottish Borderers
- Capt. Maurice Charles Wade, Royal Warwickshire Regiment
- Lt. Alan Leslie Wilson, Royal Engineers
- Lt. James Young Wilson, Royal Field Artillery
- Temp Quartermaster and Capt. Arthur Mayall Winder, Manchester Regiment
- Lt. Robert Pearson Winter, Royal Engineers

=== North Russia ===
For distinguished services rendered in connection with military operations in North Russia (Archangel Command) —

- Lt. Adolphpe Beckerleg, Royal Engineers
- Sergeant Maj. Harold Green Glögg, Liverpool Regiment
- Lt. Joseph Hodgson, Liverpool Regiment
- Capt. Humphrey Willis Chetwode Lloyd DSO Wiltshire Regiment
- Rev. Rupert Joseph Roche, Royal Army Chaplains' Department
- Capt. Rachard Graham Smerdon, Liverpool Regiment

=== Awarded a Bar to the Military Cross (MC*) ===
==== East Africa ====
For distinguished service in connection with military operations in East Africa —

- Temp Capt. Edward Andreas Priestland MC King's African Rifles

==== France and Flanders ====
For distinguished service in connection with military operations in France and Flanders—

- Capt. David Dick Anderson MC East Yorkshire Regiment
- Lt. Norman Sandeman Bostock MC South Staffordshire Regiment
- Temp Capt. John Wilder Burdett MC Leicestershire Regiment
- Temp Capt. Charles Ellis Merriam Coubrough MC Royal Garrison Artillery
- 2nd Lt. Augustus George Dickson MC Royal Field Artillery
- Lt. Charles Stanley Fisher MC Royal Garrison Artillery
- Temp Capt. Cecil Francis Tyssen Haigh MC Royal Army Ordnance Corps
- Temp Lt. Henry William Kernick MC Royal Engineers
- Temp Capt. Frank Horace-Liddell MC
- Capt. Henry Joseph Milligan MC Royal Army Medical Corps
- Lt. Harold John Mortimer MC Royal Garrison Artillery
- Lt. Edward Mount MC Royal Engineers
- Capt. William Maingay Ozanne MC West Riding Regiment
- Temp Capt. William McCutcheon Patrick MC Royal Engineers
- Capt. Alan Grant Richardson MC Royal Engineers
- Lt. Arthur Rought MC Royal Engineers
- Temp Capt. Alfred Henry Sayer MC
- Capt. Stuart Scrimgeour MC Suffolk Regiment
- Temp Capt. Eric H. Smythe MC
- Lt. Henry John Edwin Stinson MC Royal Garrison Artillery
- Lt. George Surtees MC Manchester Regiment
- Lt. James Frederick Tamblyn MC East Surrey Regiment
- Lt. Edward Maxwell Tyler MC Royal Horse Artillery
- Temp Capt. Charles William Vincent Webb MC

Australian Imperial Forces

- Capt. Charles Adrian Boccard MC Intelligence Corps, Australian Imperial Force
- Lt. George Hubert Wilkins MC Australian Imperial Force

New Zealand Forces

- Capt. Henry Delphus McHugh MC NZ Cyclist Battalion

=== Awarded a Second Bar to the Military Cross (MC**) ===
==== France and Flanders ====
For distinguished service in connection with military operations in France and Flanders—

- Temp Capt. Francis Rainalt Abbott Granville MC* Royal Fusiliers

== See also ==
- 1919 Birthday Honours - Full list of awards.
