= John Thomas (bishop of Salisbury) =

English bishop

- Bishop of Salisbury
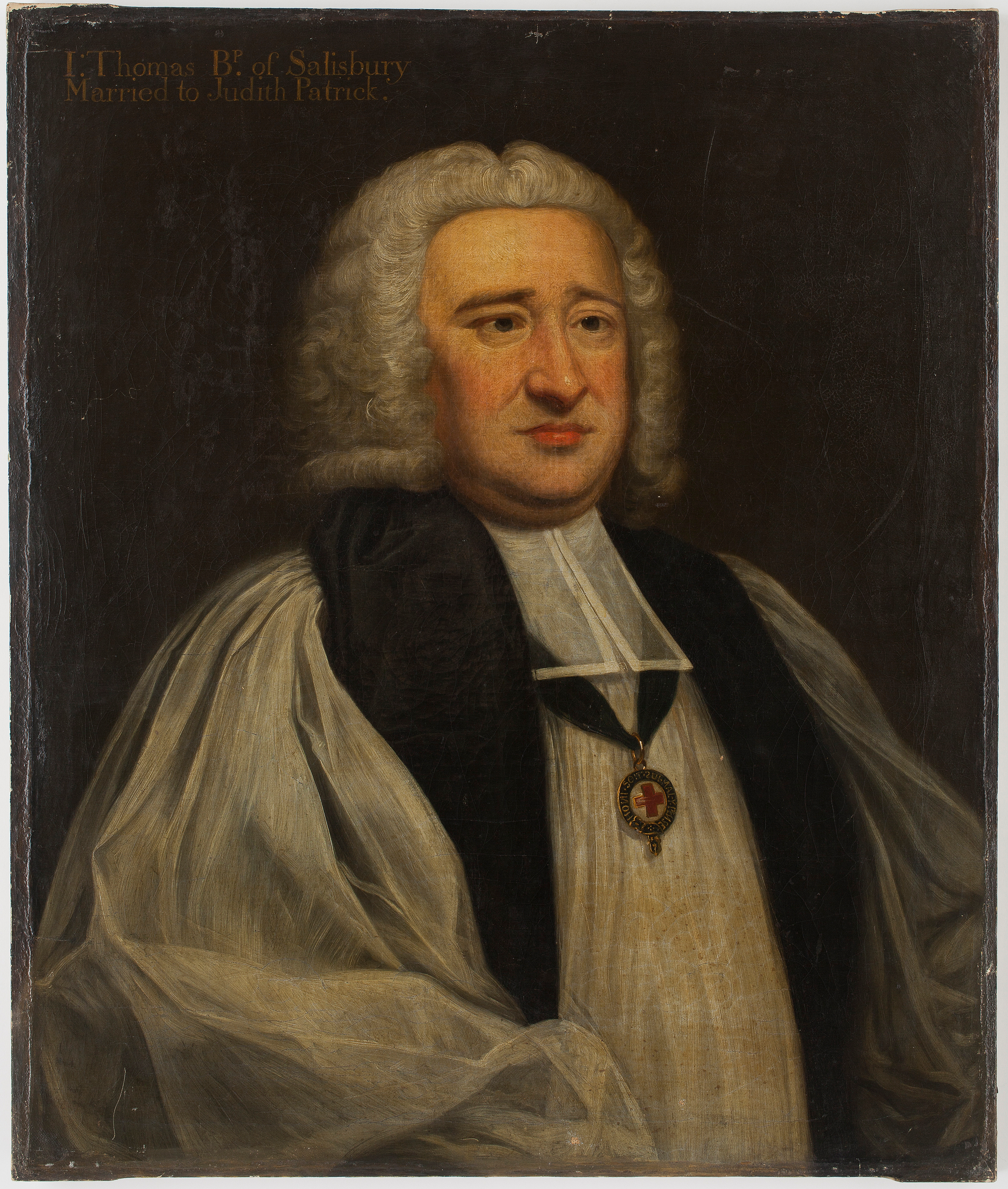
- John Thomas, painted after 1757 by un unknown artist. Around his neck can be seen the insignia of the Order of the Garter.
- Diocese: Diocese of Salisbury
- In office: 1761–1766 (d.)
- Predecessor: John Gilbert
- Successor: John Hume
- Other posts: Bishop of Lincoln (1744–1761); Chancellor of the Order of the Garter (1761–1766)

Orders
- Consecration: 1 April 1744

Personal details
- Born: 23 June 1691 City of London
- Died: 20 July 1766 (aged 75) Salisbury
- Denomination: Anglican
- Education: St Catharine's College, Cambridge

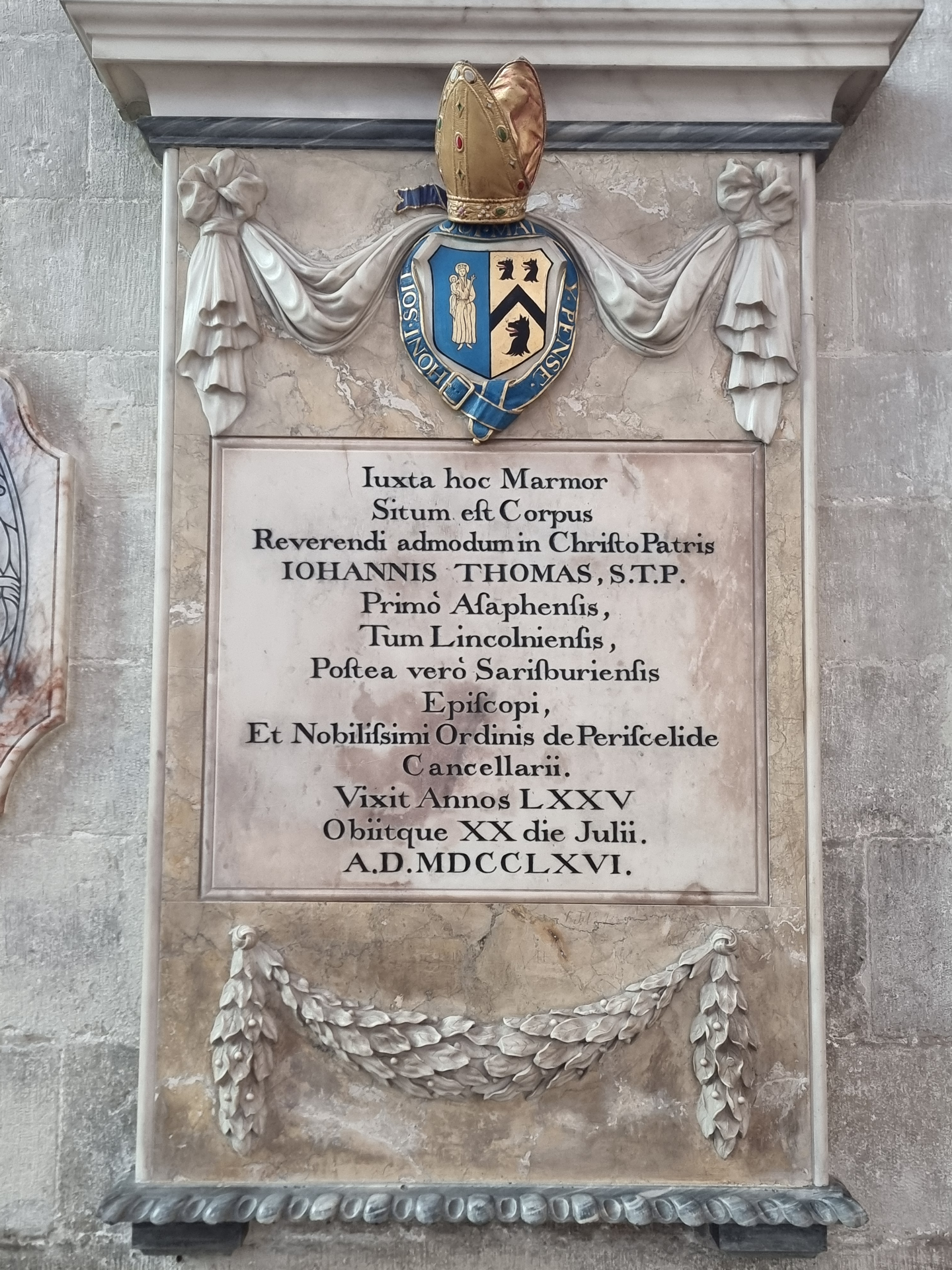
Monument to Bishop John Thomas in Salisbury Cathedral

John Thomas (1691–1766) was an English Bishop of Lincoln and Bishop of Salisbury.

== Life ==
Born on 23 June 1691, he was the son of a drayman in Nicholson's brewery in the parish of All Hallows the Great in the City of London, and was sent to the parish school. He was admitted to Merchant Taylors' School on 11 March 1703. He graduated B.A. in 1713 and M.A. in 1717 from Catharine Hall, Cambridge, was made D.D. in 1728, and incorporated at Oxford on 11 July of the same year.

He became chaplain of the English factory at Hamburg, where he was highly popular with the merchants, published a paper in German called the Patriot in imitation of The Spectator, and attracted the notice of George II, who offered him preferment in England, if his ministers would leave him any patronage to bestow. In 1736 he was presented to the rectory of St Vedast Foster Lane; he accompanied the king to Hanover at his personal request. His knowledge of German had commended him to the king, who liked him, and refused to quarrel with him for having dined at Cliefden with Frederick, Prince of Wales. He succeeded Francis Lockyer as dean of Peterborough in 1740, in spite of the opposition of the Duke of Newcastle. In 1743 he was nominated to the bishopric of St Asaph, but was immediately transferred to Lincoln, to which he was consecrated at Lambeth on 1 April 1744.

He was translated to Salisbury in November 1761 (where he was ex officio the Chancellor of the Order of the Garter), died there on 20 July 1766, and was buried in Salisbury Cathedral. His library was sold in 1767. He left one daughter, married to John Taylor, chancellor of Salisbury. Of his four wives, the first was a niece of Bishop Sherlock. The famous wedding-ring 'posy,' 'If I survive I'll make them five,' is attributed to him. Thomas was the author of sermons published between 1739 and 1756.

== Notes ==
Church of England titles
Preceded by Francis Lockier	Dean of Peterborough; 1740–1744	Succeeded by Robert Lamb
Preceded by Richard Reynolds	Bishop of Lincoln; 1744–1761	Succeeded by John Green
Preceded by Robert Hay Drummond	Bishop of Salisbury; 1761–1766	Succeeded by John Hume
