= William Barlow (dean of Peterborough) =

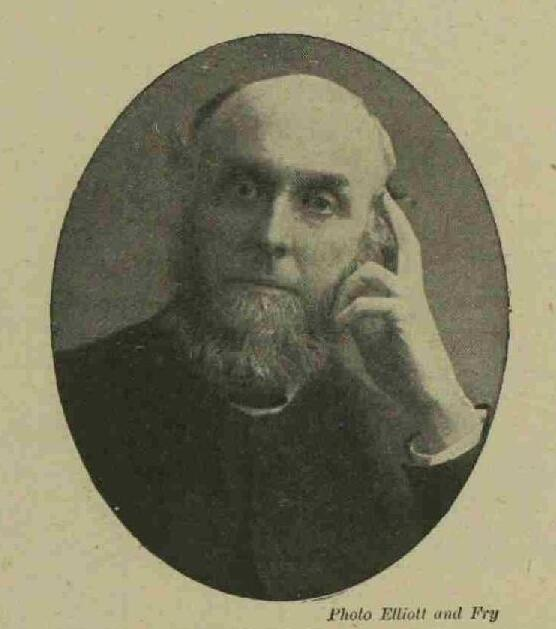
- Born: 5 May 1833; Matlock
- Died: 10 May 1908 (aged 75); Peterborough
- Alma mater: St John's College
- Children: Anderson Montague-Barlow
- Position held: Dean of Peterborough (1901–1908)

William Hagger Barlow (1833–1908) was the Dean of Peterborough in the Church of England from 1901 until his death in 1908.

William Hagger Barlow was born in 1833, son of Henry Hagger, Vicar of Pitsmoor, and educated at St John's College, Cambridge. Ordained in 1858, he began his career with a curacy at St James', Bristol before being appointed Vicar of St Bartholomew Montpelier. After serving as Vicar of St. Ebbe's, Oxford, from 1875 he was Principal of the Church Missionary Society College, Islington and was later Vicar of St Mary's Islington. He was elevated to the Deanery in June 1901, and installed in Peterborough Cathedral 5 October 1901, preaching there for the first time the following morning

Church of England titles
Preceded by William Clavell Ingram	Dean of Peterborough; 1901 –1908	Succeeded by Arnold Henry Page
