= William Ingram (priest) =

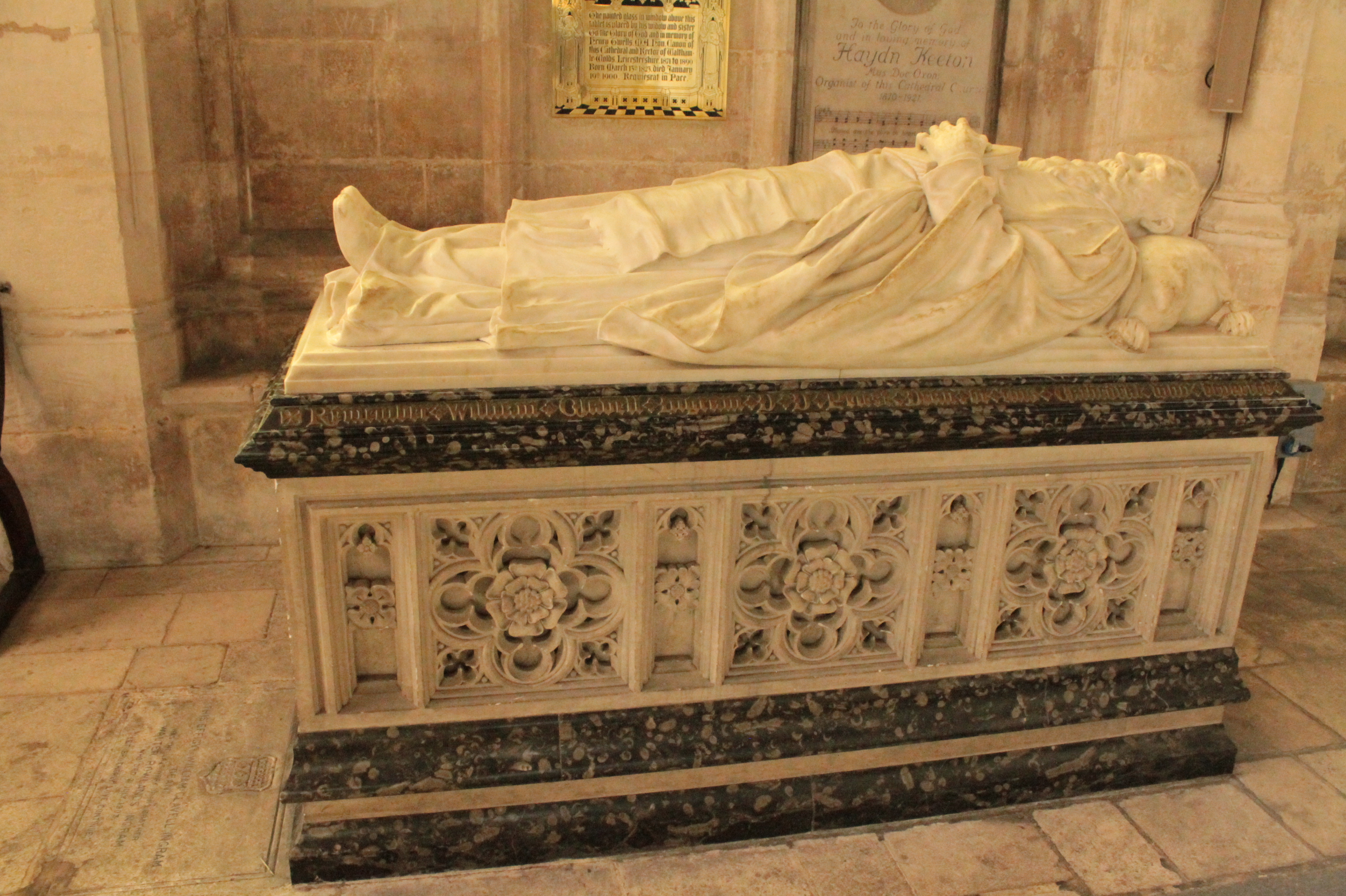
Memorial to William Clavell Ingram in Peterborough Cathedral

William Clavell Ingram was an Anglican priest and the Dean of Peterborough in the Church of England from 1893 until his death in 1901.

Born on 11 August 1834 at Chedburgh, Suffolk, the son of Rev. George Ingram and Jane Kaines Clavell, he was educated at Jesus College, Cambridge. He was a master at Lancing College then a chaplain to HM Forces before being appointed vicar of Kirk Michael, Isle of Man. From 1874, he was vicar of St Matthew's Church, Leicester before his elevation to the deanery. In 1900–1901, he wrote and published a biography of his friend, the Rev. Canon Henry Twells.

He died on 26 April 1901, and three years later a memorial to him was put in place at Peterborough Cathedral. The life-size marble effigy was carved by his brother Walter Rowlands Ingram. The monument stands in the south-east section close to the burial place of Mary, Queen of Scots.

Church of England titles
Preceded by Marsham Argles	Dean of Peterborough; 1893 –1901	Succeeded by William Hagger Barlow
