= Gerard Carleton =

Gerard Carleton (died 1549) was the second Dean of Peterborough.

He graduated from Queens' College, Cambridge in 1524. He was rector of Stanway from 1531 to 1542; and a canon of Westminster from 1540 until his death in 1549.

== Notes ==
Church of England titles
Preceded by Francis Leycester	Dean of Peterborough; 1543–1549	Succeeded by James Curthoppe
