= Dick Wingfield Digby =

Richard Shuttleworth Wingfield Digby (19 August 1911 – 29 January 2007) was the Dean of Peterborough in the Church of England from 1966 to 1980.

He was educated at the Nautical College, Pangbourne, and Christ's College, Cambridge. He was ordained in 1937 and began his ministry as a curate at St Andrew's, Rugby. He then became a chaplain to the Forces and was a prisoner of war from 1940 to 1945. When peace returned he became vicar of All Saints, Newmarket and then Rural Dean of Bury before his appointment to the deanery.

Church of England titles
Preceded by Noel Charles Christopherson	Dean of Peterborough; 1966–1980	Succeeded by Randolph George Wise
