= Dean of Peterborough =

Head of the chapter at Peterborough Cathedral, England

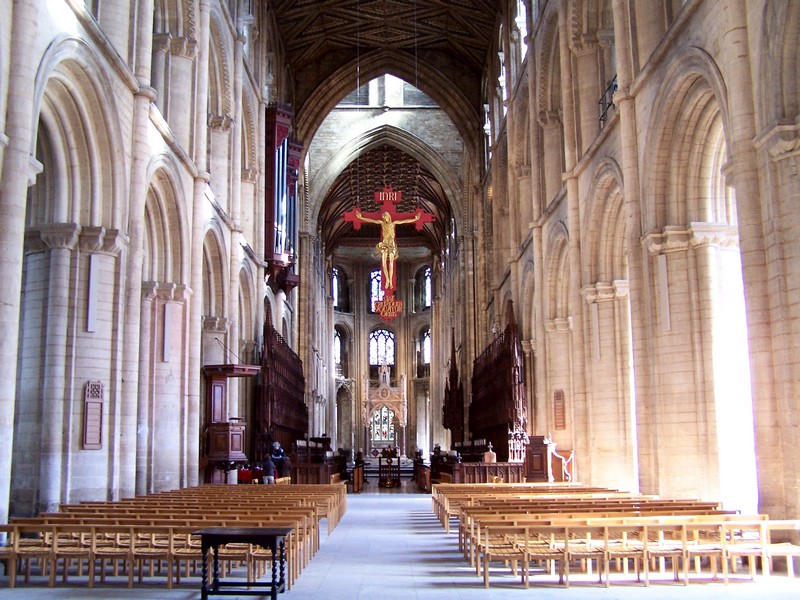
The nave of Peterborough Cathedral

The Dean of Peterborough is the head of the chapter at Peterborough Cathedral. On the Dissolution of Peterborough Abbey in 1539 and the abbey-church's refoundation as a cathedral for the new bishop and diocese of Peterborough, care for the abbey/cathedral church passed from an abbot to a dean. The current Dean of Peterborough is Chris Dalliston.

== List of deans ==
=== Early modern ===
- 1541–1542 Francis Leycester

(last prior of St Andrew's Priory, Northampton)

- 1543–1549 Gerard Carleton
- 1549–1557 James Curthoppe
- 1557–1559 John Boxall (deprived)
- 1560–1583 William Latymer
- 1583–1589 Richard Fletcher
- 1590–1597 Thomas Nevile
- 1597–1607 John Palmer
- 1607–1612 Richard Clayton
- 1612–1617 George Meriton
- 1617–1622 Henry Beaumont (later dean of Windsor)
- 1622–1630 William Piers
- 1630–1639 John Towers
- 1639–1640 Thomas Jackson
- 1640–1660 John Cosin
- 1661–1664 Edward Rainbowe
- 1664–1679 James Duport
- 1679–1689 Simon Patrick
- 1689–1691 Richard Kidder
- 1691–1707 Samuel Freeman
- 1707–1718 White Kennett
- 1718–1721 Richard Reynolds
- 1721–1722 Edward Gee
- 1722–1725 John Mandeville
- 1725–1740 Francis Lockier
- 1740–1744 John Thomas
- 1744–1764 Robert Lamb
- 1764–1791 Charles Tarrant
- 1791–1792 Charles Manners-Sutton
- 1792–1797 Peter Peckard

=== Late modern ===
- 1797–1822 Thomas Kipling
- 1822–1830 James Henry Monk
- 1830–1842 Thomas Turton
- 1842–1853 George Butler
- 1853–1878 Augustus Saunders (previously Headmaster of Charterhouse School)
- 1878–1890 John Perowne
- 1891–1892 Marsham Argles
- 1893–1901 William Ingram
- 1901–1908 William Barlow
- 1908–1928 Arnold Page
- 1928–1942 James Simpson
- 1943–1965 Noel Christopherson
- 1966–1980 Dick Wingfield-Digby
- 1981–1992 Randolph Wise
- 1992–31 March 2006 Michael Bunker
- 2006–2 October 2016 (ret.) Charles Taylor
- 2 October 2016 – 9 October 2017 Jonathan Baker (Acting)
- 2017: Tim Sledge (dean-designate only: announced 27 August 2017, but withdrew his nomination due to personal health reasons)
- 9 October 2017 – 20 January 2018 Tim Alban Jones (Acting)
- 20 January 2018 – present Chris Dalliston

== Sources ==
- British History Online – Fasti Ecclesiae Anglicanae 1541–1857 – Deans of Peterborough
- Peterborough City Council – Peterborough abbey (Peterborough Cathedral)
- British History Online – Houses of Benedictine monks: The abbey of Peterborough – A History of the County of Northampton: Volume 2 (1906), pp. 83–95. Accessed 29 May 2007.
