= Miles Giffard =

English cricketer (1925–1953)

Miles William Giffard (18 December 1925 – 24 February 1953) was an English cricketer and convicted murderer. He played cricket five times for the Cornwall County Cricket Club in the 1948 Minor Counties Championship. He was later executed for the murder of his parents.

== Education ==
Giffard was born in 1925, and educated at Rugby School in Rugby in Warwickshire and at Blundell's School in Tiverton.

== Cricket ==
Miles Giffard played cricket for the Cornwall County Cricket Club in the 1948 Minor Counties Championship, playing against Devon at St Clare Ground in Penzance on 16 July 1948 and Surrey Second XI at Kennington Oval on 4 and 5 August 1948.

== Crime ==
By the age of 14 Giffard was being seen by a psychiatrist who was concerned at his mental deterioration. By the time Miles was 26 he was in the words of his doctor, an 'idle little waster' who, despite being given every opportunity, had been unable to hold a steady job. Miles’ parents were busy and well respected people in St Austell, his father Charles being a solicitor and clerk of the court to St. Austell magistrates and his mother Elizabeth was vice chairman of the St Austell Conservative Association and President of the Conservative Women's Association.

It is reported that:

"Miles hated his father and in return his father never missed an opportunity to put him down. "
"In 1952 he met a girl that he liked and he soon developed a serious relationship with her. Gabrielle Vallance was 19 years old and lived in London. His parents however did not like her and told him that he had to give her up. In one of the letters he wrote to the girl he said, 'Short of doing him in, I see no future in the world at all.' "
"On 7 November he asked his father if he could borrow the car but his father said no. That afternoon his parents went out and Miles stayed at home brooding and getting drunk. By the time his parents returned about 7.30pm Miles had decided what to do. He went down to the garage and using a piece of lead pipe he beat his father to death. Taking the same piece of pipe into the house he then went into the kitchen and bludgeoned his mother to death. He took the bodies and tipped them over the cliff at the end of the garden and then got in the car and drove to see his girlfriend in London. "

The bodies were found the next day and the police had little trouble tracing Giffard and arresting him.

"Despite clear evidence of schizophrenia presented at his trial at Bodmin Assizes it took the jury only 35 minutes to find him guilty and he was sentenced to death" by Mr Justice Oliver.

== Execution ==
Giffard was hanged at Horfield Prison in Bristol on 24 February 1953.

== Television production ==
John Castle played the part of Miles Giffard in the 1970 production "Conceptions of Murder: Conversation Piece", directed by Graham Evans.

== Sources ==
- Murder Charge Against Son, Evidence Of Grave Mental Disorder, The Times, Thursday, 5 February 1953 (pg. 2; Issue 52538; col D)
- Giffard Found Guilty - Death Sentence for Murder of Father, The Times, Saturday, 7 February 1953 (pg. 3; Issue 52540; col C)
- Giffard Executed, The Times, Wednesday, 25 February 1953 (pg. 5; Issue 52555; col A)
- Van der Kiste, John, & Sly, Nicola, Cornish Murders (Sutton Publishing, 2007)
- This Week in Crime – "Schizo Son Slays Parents’, True Crime Library, Extracted 6 November 2009
- www.real-crime.co.uk, Male Murders, Giffard, Miles, Extracted 6 November 2009
- Cricketarchive.com, Players – Miles Giffard, Extracted 06.11.09
- "Conceptions of Murder: Conversation Piece", British Film Institute, Film and TV Database, Extracted 6 November 2009
