= John Mandeville (priest) =

English cleric (1655–1725)

John Mandeville (1655 – 21 January 1725) was a Canon of Windsor from 1709 to 1722 and Dean of Peterborough from 1722 to 1725.

== Career ==
He was educated at Worksop College and St John’s College, Cambridge, where he graduated BA 1673, MA 1677 and DD in 1694.

He was appointed as:

- Rector of Dry Drayton, Cambridge 1690–1691
- Chaplain to the King and Queen 1690–1725
- Rector of St Mary Magdalene, Old Fish Street 1691–1713
- Prebendary of Lincoln 1695
- Chancellor of Lincoln 1695–1713
- Archdeacon of Lincoln 1709–1725
- Dean of Peterborough 1722–1725
- Prebendary of Westminster 1722–1725

He was appointed to the eighth stall in St George's Chapel, Windsor Castle in 1709, and held the stall until 1722.
