= Chariots of Fire (play) =

2012 play

- Written by: Mike Bartlett (stage adaptation); Colin Welland (screenplay)
- Music by: Vangelis
- Characters: Eric Liddell; Harold Abrahams; Lord Andrew Lindsay; Aubrey Montague; Sam Mussabini
- Genre: drama, sports, inspirational
- Setting: 1924 Paris Olympics; Cambridge University; Scotland

Premiere
- Date: 9 May 2012
- Place: Hampstead Theatre, London
- Official website

Chariots of Fire is a 2012 stage adaptation of the 1981 Oscar-winning film of the same name. Production of the Olympic-themed play, which opened at London's Hampstead Theatre 9 May 2012 and transferred to the West End on 23 June 2012, was partially inspired by the 2012 London Summer Olympics.

== Overview ==
The Chariots of Fire adaptation for the stage was written by playwright Mike Bartlett, and Edward Hall directed the play. It starred Jack Lowden as Scottish missionary Eric Liddell, and James McArdle as Jewish Cambridge student Harold Abrahams. For the production, stage designer Miriam Buether transformed the entire theatre into an Olympic stadium, so that audiences had the experience of being in the Olympic stands.

The play includes the film's iconic Vangelis score, and Vangelis also created several new pieces of music for the production. As in the film, Gilbert and Sullivan songs are also used, and additional music was provided by Tony Award-winning composer Jason Carr.

The stage version for the London Olympic year was the idea of the film's director, Hugh Hudson, who co-produced the play; Hudson stated, "Issues of faith, of refusal to compromise, standing up for one's beliefs, achieving something for the sake of it, with passion, and not just for fame or financial gain, are even more vital today."

Chariots of Fire opened in previews 9 May at London's Hampstead Theatre, and officially opened there on 22 May. It transferred to the Gielgud Theatre in the West End on 23 June, where it ran until 5 January 2013.

== Original cast ==
- Jack Lowden – Eric Liddell, the devout son of Scottish missionaries to China
- James McArdle – Harold Abrahams, a Jewish student at Cambridge University
- Tam Williams – Lord Andrew Lindsay, a Cambridge student runner, partially based on Lord Burghley and Douglas Lowe
- Mark Edel-Hunt – Aubrey Montague, a runner and friend of Harold Abrahams
- Nickolas Grace – Master of Trinity College at Cambridge University
- Simon Williams – Master of Caius College at Cambridge University
- Nicholas Woodeson – Sam Mussabini, Britain's greatest running coach
- Natasha Broomfield – Jennie Liddell, Eric's devout sister
- Savannah Stevenson – Sybil Evers, Harold Abrahams' fiancée
- Antonia Bernath – Florence Mackenzie, Eric Liddell's Canadian fiancée
- Matthew Pearson – Sandy McGrath, Liddell's friend and running coach
- David Newman – the Prince of Wales, who tries to get Liddell to change his mind about running on Sunday

== Synopsis ==
Chariots of Fire is the inspirational true story of two great British athletes, outsiders who overcome prejudice and personal strife to compete in the 1924 Paris Olympics. Eric Liddell is a devout Scottish Christian who runs for the glory of God. Harold Abrahams is the son of an immigrant Lithuanian Jew who runs to overcome prejudice. The two young track athletes live for the purity and honour of running, and prevail in the face of enormous odds. The story begins in 1919, and climaxes in the heartbreaks and triumphs of the 1924 Paris Olympics.

== Production ==
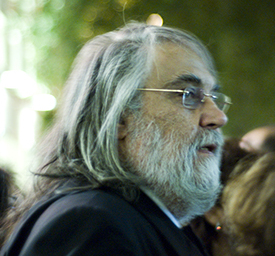
In addition to his iconic original score, Vangelis created several new pieces of music for the 2012 play.

The stage revival of the film was the inspiration of Hugh Hudson, who directed the 1981 film. He and fellow co-producer Barbara Broccoli, a film-industry magnate best known for the James Bond franchise, set about looking for the perfect director for the piece. Broccoli's involvement with Chariots of Fire extended back to 1980, when she introduced her friend Dodi Fayed to the screenplay, and he ended up co-financing the film and becoming its executive producer.

Hudson and Broccoli chose Edward Hall to helm the stage adaptation, based upon his clear and incisive view of all the challenges involved in adapting the athletics-heavy story to the stage. Hall recruited the award-winning playwright Mike Bartlett, based on his many successes including Earthquakes in London, to write the script for the play.

Set designer Miriam Buether transformed Hampstead Theatre into its very own stadium, giving the audience an immersive experience that evoked the 1924 Paris Olympics, including seating in the round around an Olympic track, and a double revolving stage. Buether also later transformed the Gielgud Theatre into an immersive stadium with a track running through the audience. And choreographer Scott Ambler reinvented and choreographed the various running scenes for maximum theatrical effect.

Scottish actor Jack Lowden was cast as Eric Liddell, following his performance as the main character Cammy in an international tour of the Olivier Award-winning play Black Watch. RADA-trained James McArdle, who had most recently portrayed Robin Hood at the RSC, was chosen to play Harold Abrahams.

Rehearsals for the actors portraying athletes incorporated grueling training, including lengthy runs, with a British Military Fitness instructor. And when stars Jack Lowden and James McArdle discovered they live on the same London street, they began running to rehearsals in addition to the required group training.

== Differences from the film ==
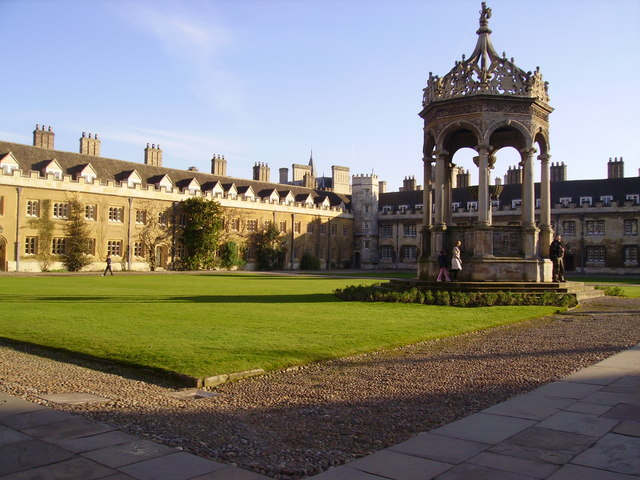
The Great Court at Trinity College, Cambridge, site of the Great Court Run

In the 1981 film, screenwriter Colin Welland anchored the period story to the present by opening with Harold Abrahams' 1978 memorial service. In Mike Bartlett's 2012 play, the story is anchored to the present by beginning the piece with 15 modern athletes doing a warm-up, "which turns into a training session, which suddenly evolves into Lord Lindsay and Harold Abrahams."

Bartlett also used theatrical techniques to allow the play to "tell two stories at the same time, and show links between them and metaphors and parallels", using the Eric Liddell story to talk about Harold Abrahams and using Harold to talk about Eric. The play contains more meetings between Liddell and Abrahams than there were in the film, and also more humour. In contrast to the film, the play has Abrahams struggling with, in addition to anti-Semitism, thoughts of his estranged and never-present father.

Director Edward Hall stated that, in addition, "In theatre you can take components of the story and analyse them narratively in different ways. So you can stretch or freeze a moment in a race.... it gives you more freedom." Astute staging, he noted, can convey all of the various emotions that take place while running, and then finishing, a race.

And in contrast to the film, the play also introduces a female admirer for Eric Liddell: his real-life fiancée Florence Mackenzie, the daughter of Canadian missionaries to China. Also in the play, the very fit ensemble cast and extras are not only utilized for running and racing, but also are frequently employed in singing as well.

== Critical reception ==
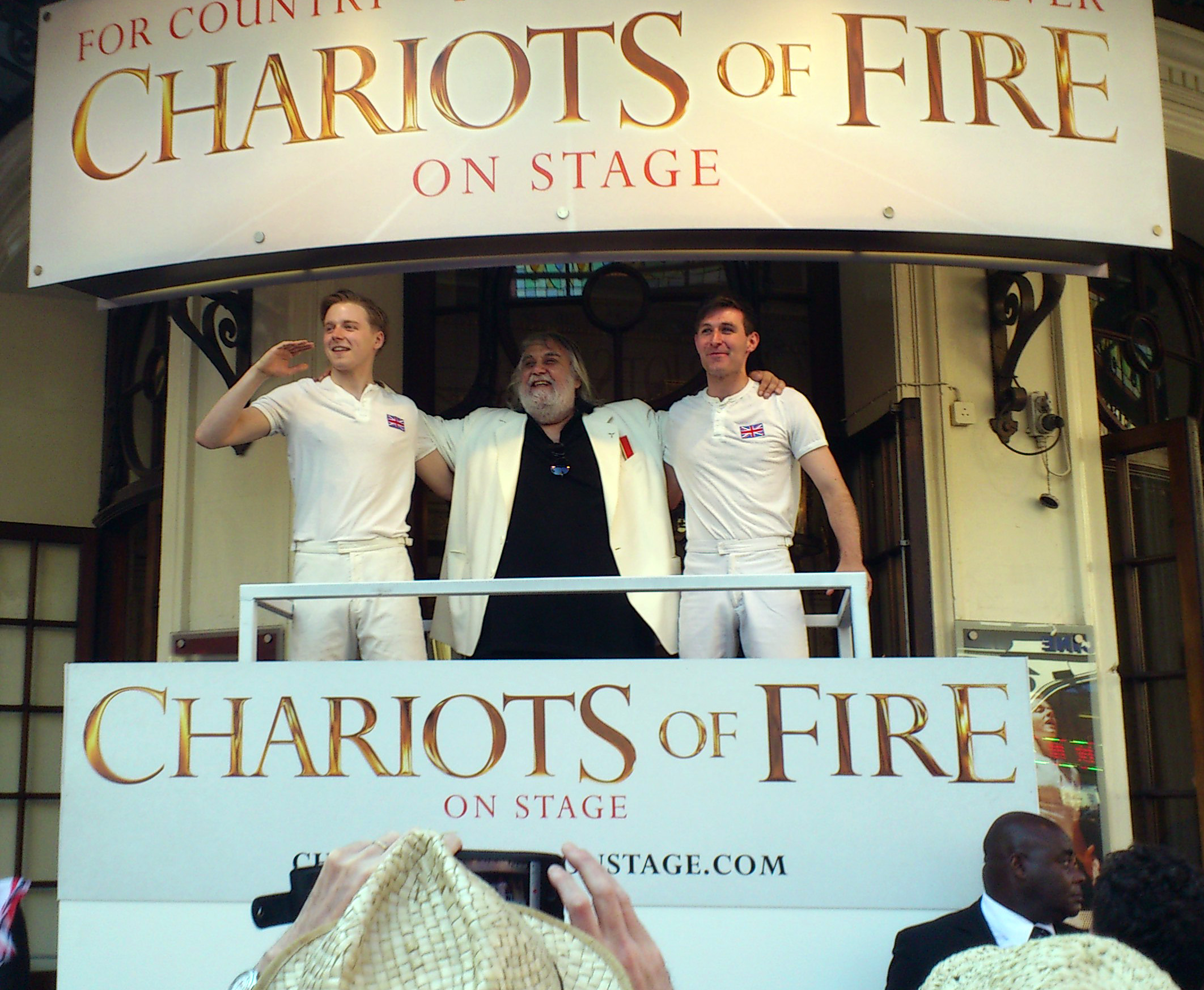
Jack Lowden, Vangelis, and James McArdle watch the Olympic Torch Relay from the Gielgud Theatre, July 2012.

Chariots of Fire opened officially on 22 May 2012, and received positive reviews from major critics in major UK publications. By 29 May, the Hampstead Theatre run had sold out.

Libby Purves of The Times wrote that "even this grumpy Olymposceptic was brought to actual tears, moved to empathy and understanding by the fabulous theatricality of it." She called Edward Hall's staging "thrilling" and the play "irresistible", adding that "above all, it's the sincerity: a full-blooded willingness to take the hearty morality, amateur spirit and patriotism at its own valuation without modish irony." Praising the main cast, Purves singled out Jack Lowden as "outstanding", and Nicholas Woodeson as "superb".

Christopher Hart of the Sunday Times also gave the play five stars, declaring it "a bravura version of the 1981 movie". "It's Edward Hall's staging that's the real winner" he wrote, describing the running sequences as "pure exhilaration". He summed up the play as "a joyful antidote to the modern Olympics", "a real summer high", and "surely one of the great treats of the summer".

Ian Shuttleworth in the Financial Times praised Edward Hall's "considerable adroitness" in directing what he deemed "a fine Olympic-season project". He also admired Bartlett's script in that "[h]e utilises the stage's greater ability to open up to the protagonists’ inner voices, showing Abrahams’ preoccupation with his never-present father and in particular Liddell's devout brand of muscular Christianity ...." Michael Billington of The Guardian praised "Edward Hall's bravura production" and Miriam Buether's "brilliant" set. He also noted approvingly that Hall's "kaleidoscopic pageant" of a play is bound together by music, including Gilbert and Sullivan numbers, Scottish bagpipes, a medley of British folk tunes, and the iconic Vangelis theme.

Andrzej Lukowski of Time Out wrote, "This lavish stage adaptation ... is about as close to a West End musical as it's possible to get without in fact being one", citing the frequent Gilbert and Sullivan hits, the impressive stadium set, the 21-strong ensemble cast, and the stylized running choreography. Lukowski praised Bartlett for his "funny, pithy and creative" script, and summarized the production by asserting it is "a spectacle".

The Independent noted that, in a play about competition, "what eventually emerges as the really engaging battle of wills is that of Abrahams and Liddell versus the British Establishment – ironic, as they each strive to shine for king and country." And The Observer opined that "[Hall's] fantastically enjoyable production of Chariots of Fire is a triumph of will that is in keeping with the spirit of the story it tells.... This is an unmissable theatrical offering in the year of the London Olympics."

Many reviewers commented on the intense, often breathless, physicality of the production. The high-speed running around the perimeter of the auditorium and through the audience reminded some of Starlight Express, and Mark Lawson on BBC Radio 4's Front Row evoked the recent hit play War Horse as a comparison to the Chariots play, adding that "It's such an unusual theatre show!"

Henry Hitchings in The Evening Standard deemed the play a "stirring crowd-pleaser" and "a potently realised spectacle", concluding that while "undeniably bombastic fare", "energy and conviction make Chariots of Fire a satisfying experience." In The Stage, Mark Shenton echoed other reviews regarding the high-energy, intriguingly staged production. He emphasized in addition that "the meat of the drama" is the "gripping human confrontation being played out at its centre, in which two young men from very different backgrounds ... are drawn into competition with each other but also a bigger one with themselves and what truly matters to each." Shenton concluded that the play "succeeds on its own terms to provide what is sure to be a huge popular theatrical success."

== Production credits ==
- Producers: Hugh Hudson, Barbara Broccoli
- Director: Edward Hall
- Playwright: Mike Bartlett
- Set Designer: Miriam Buether
- Original Music: Vangelis
- Choreography: Scott Ambler
- Additional Music: Jason Carr

== Score ==
The play's incidental music was released on CD in 2012, titled Chariots of Fire – The Play: Music from the Stage Show. Except for the hymn "Jerusalem", the music was composed, arranged and produced by Vangelis. The CD length is 58:22 minutes, and includes three tracks previously released on the movie soundtrack, two of which are slightly updated. All other 11 Vangelis tracks are newly composed specifically for the stage play.

Chariots Of Fire – The Play
No.	Title	Length
1.	"Chariots of Fire" (previously released, updated)	3:29
2.	"Physical Energy"	3:13
3.	"Home in the Glen"	3:52
4.	"Eric's Theme" (previously released, updated)	4:06
5.	"Abraham's Theme" (previously released)	3:02
6.	"Harold's Despair"	2:25
7.	"Belief"	4:11
8.	"Ballad"	3:10
9.	"Aspiration"	8:09
10.	"Eric's Pleasure"	5:07
11.	"Lord Lindsay"	1:36
12.	"At The Starting Blocks"	3:56
13.	"Epilogue"	4:26
14.	"After the Race"	4:37
15.	"Jerusalem" (previously released)	3:05
