= Chariots of Fire (disambiguation) =

Chariots of Fire is a 1981 British film.

Chariots of Fire may also refer to:

== Literature ==
- Chariot of Fire, a 1977 novel by E. E. Y. Hales
- "Chariots of fire", a line from the 1808 poem "And did those feet in ancient time" by William Blake

== Music ==
- Chariots of Fire (album), a 1981 album by Vangelis
  - "Chariots of Fire" (instrumental), a 1981 instrumental by Vangelis
- "Chariots of Fire", a song by Al Green from his 1977 album The Belle Album
- "Chariots of Fire", a song by Bathory from their 1987 album Under the Sign of the Black Mark
- "Chariots of Fire", a song by BWO from their 2006 album Halcyon Days
- "Chariots of Fire", a song by Raury from his 2014 album Indigo Child

== Sports ==
- Chariots of Fire (harness race), in Menangle, Australia
- Chariots of Fire (relay race), in Cambridge, England

== Other uses ==
- Chariots of Fire (play), a 2012 play by Mike Bartlett
- Elijah's chariot of fire in the Second Book of Kings
- Articulated buses in London, nicknamed "chariots of fire" because of a series of fires involving them
