= Orwell Clunch Pit =

Site of Special Scientific Interest in Orwell, Cambridgeshire

Coordinates: 52.137°N 0.01°W

- Site of Special Scientific Interest
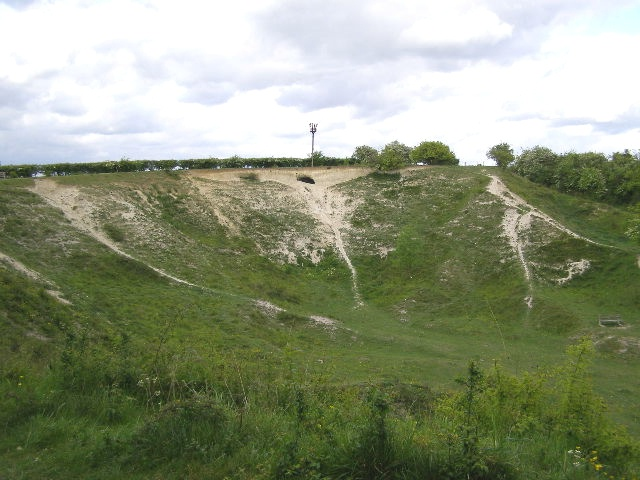
- Location of Orwell Clunch Pit.
- Area of search: Cambridgeshire
- Grid reference: TL 363 506
- Interest: Biological
- Area: 1.8 hectares
- Notification date: 1985
- Location map: Magic Map

Orwell Clunch Pit is a 1.8-hectare (4.4-acre) biological Site of Special Scientific Interest on the northern outskirts of Orwell in Cambridgeshire. It is owned by Orwell Parish Council and managed by the Clunch Pit Management Trust.

This former stone quarry has a rich chalk grassland flora, a habitat which has become scarce in eastern England. Herbs including kidney vetch, horseshoe vetch, spiny restharrow and wild thyme.

There is access from Quarry Lane.
