= Orwell, Cambridgeshire =

Village in Cambridgeshire, England

Coordinates: 52.133°N 0.017°W

Orwell
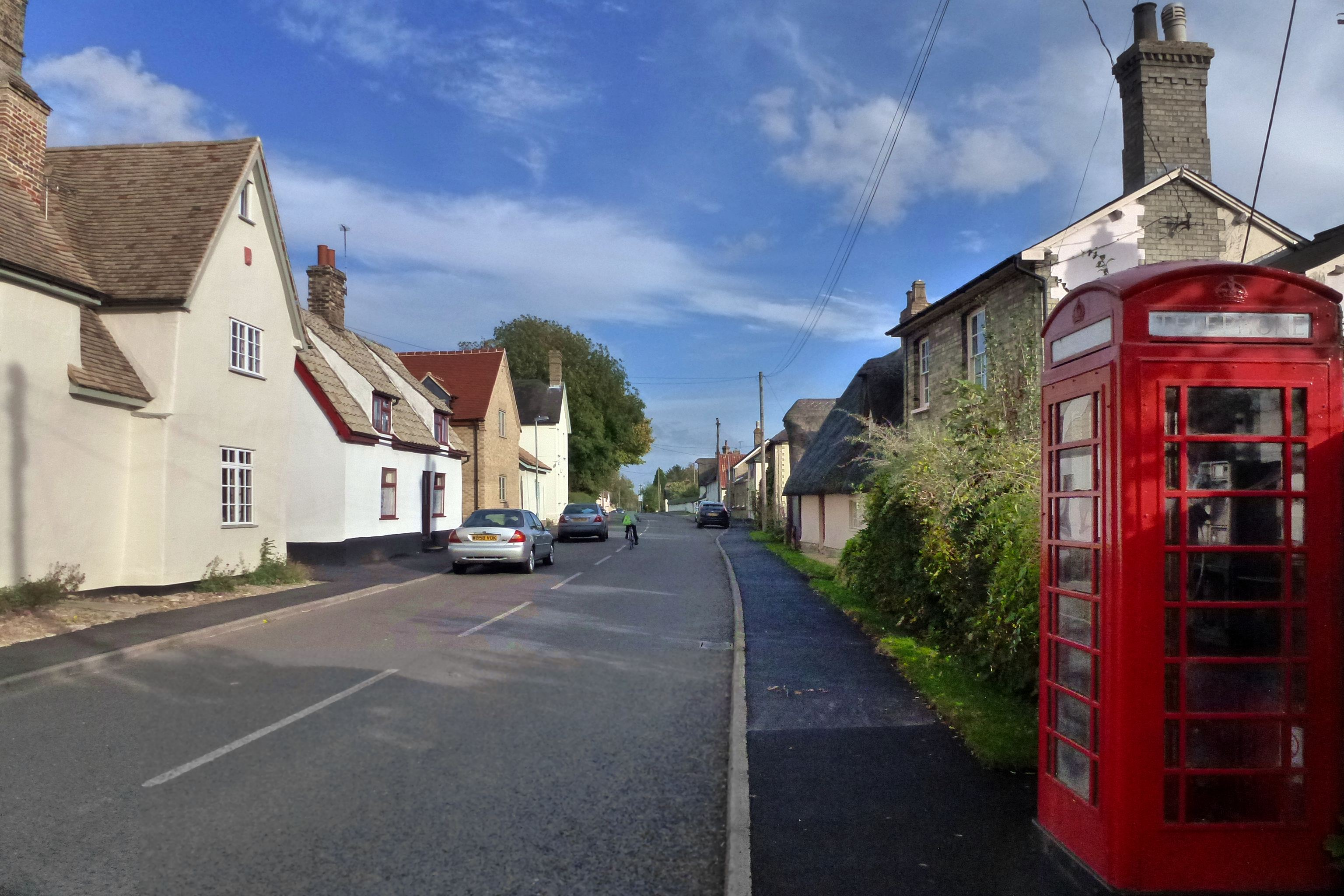
- Orwell High Street

- Location within Cambridgeshire
- Population: 1,080 (2001); 1,035 (2011)
- OS grid reference: TL357502
- Shire county: Cambridgeshire
- Region: East
- Country: England
- Sovereign state: United Kingdom
- Post town: Royston
- Postcode district: SG8

Orwell is a rural village outside Cambridge in South Cambridgeshire, England.

The Prime Meridian passes the eastern edge of Orwell.

== History ==
The village of Orwell grew around the well that gave it its name and the Roman road that runs to Cambridge runs alongside the village. Listed in the Domesday Book of 1086 as Ordeuuella, (Ord Wella, in Old English) the village's name means "spring by a pointed hill".

The hill in question may be the natural one which lies behind St Andrew's Church. However, it is anything but pointed. There was once a man-made hill near to where the Church now stands, and an old map shows it as being pointed and that a spring emerged from its foot. The date of this hill is not known, but if it was made for a religious purpose then it may well pre-date the Church. There is an old excavation site for clunch, a traditional building material, in the side of the hill. It is now overgrown with wild flowers and is grazed by rare breeds of sheep. "The Clunch Pit" has views into three different counties, as the pit places visitors a couple hundred feet above the village below. It also contains a very small cave.

The parish is home to Malton Farm, the only remaining part of the former village of Malton which was a separate parish to Orwell until the late 18th century.

The oldest surviving houses in the village date from the 16th century. The parish's main commercial activity has always been agriculture, though a coprolite mine opened for a brief period at the end of the 19th century, and a brewery was run.

== St Andrew's Church ==
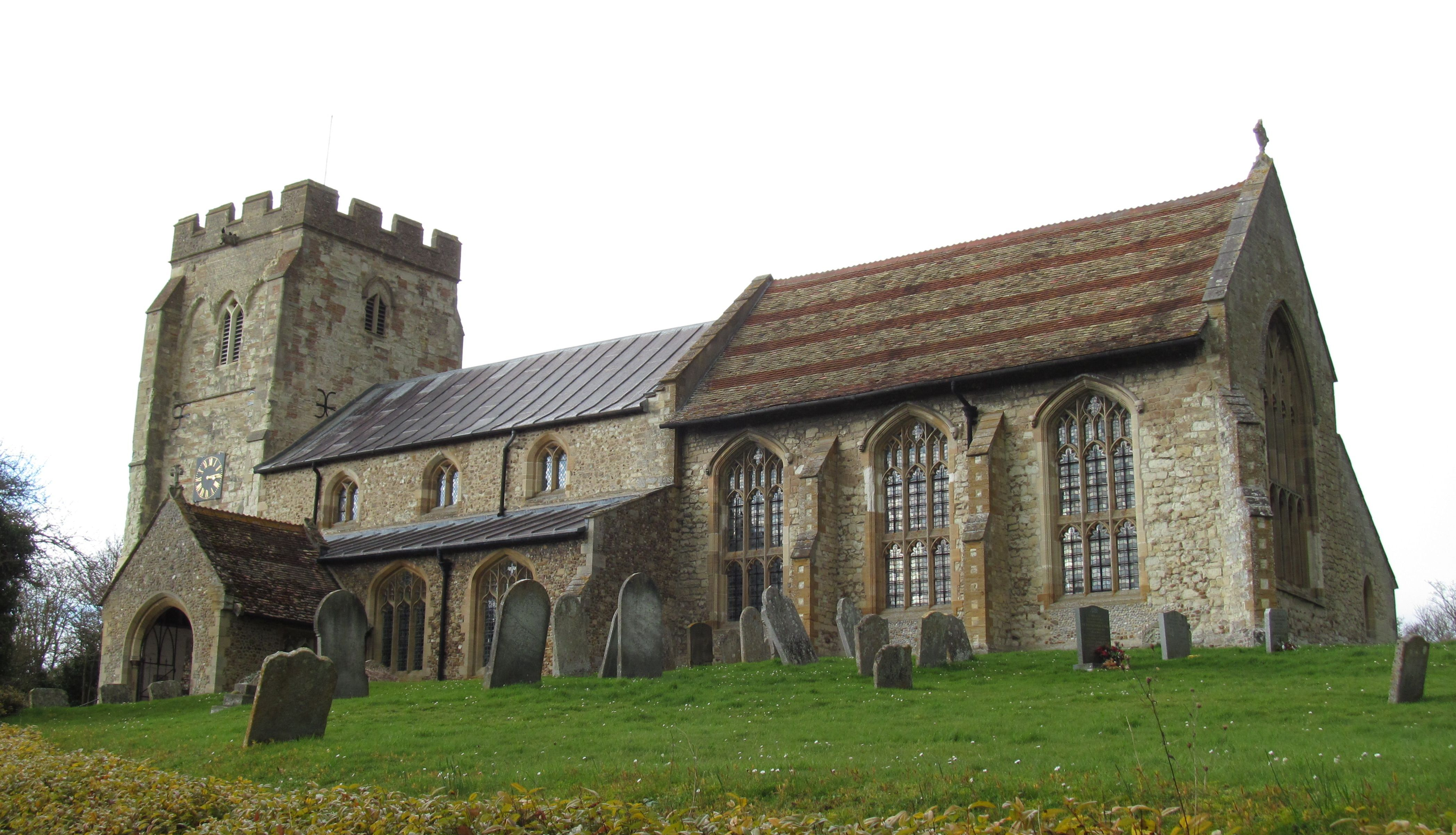
St Andrew's Parish Church, Orwell

St Andrew's was founded sometime about 1150 AD, however, little of this early church remains. The tower, which was built in 1250, is decorated with dog-tooth carving and blind arcading; unfortunately the tower has undergone severe wear over its 850 years, so the arcading has disappeared from the north wall, and much of the tower is patched with brick. The simple nave was rebuilt in the early 14th century, whilst the chancel, built by a bequest from the Rector, Richard Anlaby, is overpowering for the size of the nave. The south aisle dates from the 14th century, whilst the north was re-built using brick in 1883.

The simple misericords date from the early 15th century. These misericords are all simple V shapes, with a small decoration at the base.

In the 18th century, the original 1610 clock of Trinity College was donated to village. It was installed in the tower, where it still runs.

During the 19th-century restoration a crucifixion sculpture, dating from about 1300, was discovered, this now resides at the east end of the south aisle, and although Mary is missing from it, Christ is shown in his agony on a simple crucifix made from a tree, with St John watching on.

The chancel vault was replaced during the 19th century, and the bosses, showing the arms of several county families, and painted in distemper, were recreated from a manuscript housed at Wimpole Hall.

== Village life ==
The village is often a hub for the smaller villages around, and plays host to events all year round.

There were two pubs listed in the village in 1756, rising to seven by 1882. By 1936 there were still six, but by 1970 only The Chequers remained. It remains the village's only pub.
