= Adolphe Abrahams =

British medical doctor

Sir Adolphe Abrahams OBE FRCP
- Born: 6 February 1883; Cape Town, Cape Colony
- Died: 11 December 1967 (aged 84)
- Education: Bedford School; Bedford Modern School; Emmanuel College, Cambridge
- Occupation: Physician
- Spouse: Adrienne Walsh
- Children: 2
- Awards: Officer of the Order of the British Empire; Fellow of the Royal College of Physicians of London; Knight Bachelor

Sir Adolphe Abrahams OBE FRCP (6 February 1883 – 11 December 1967) was a British medical doctor, and he is considered to be the founder of British sports science.

== Career ==
Abrahams was born in Cape Town on 6 February 1883, as the son of Isaac and Esther Abrahams. He was educated at Bedford Modern School between 1891 and 1899, at Bedford School, and at Emmanuel College, Cambridge.

Abrahams is considered the founder of British sports science. He was the medical officer in charge of the British Olympic teams from 1912 until 1948. He was also the President of the British Association of Sports and Medicine, and a Fellow of the Royal Society of Medicine.

Abrahams was knighted in 1939.

== Family life ==
Abrahams married Adrienne Walsh in 1922; they had a son and a daughter. He was the elder brother of the athletes Harold Abrahams CBE and Sir Sidney Abrahams KC. He died on 11 December 1967.

In the Oscar-winning film Chariots of Fire, about his brother Harold Abrahams played by Ben Cross, Harold shows his friend a picture of his brother, a doctor, who was Adolphe Abrahams.
