= Trinity College Clock =

Historic pendulum clock

Coordinates: 52.207149°N 0.11752°E

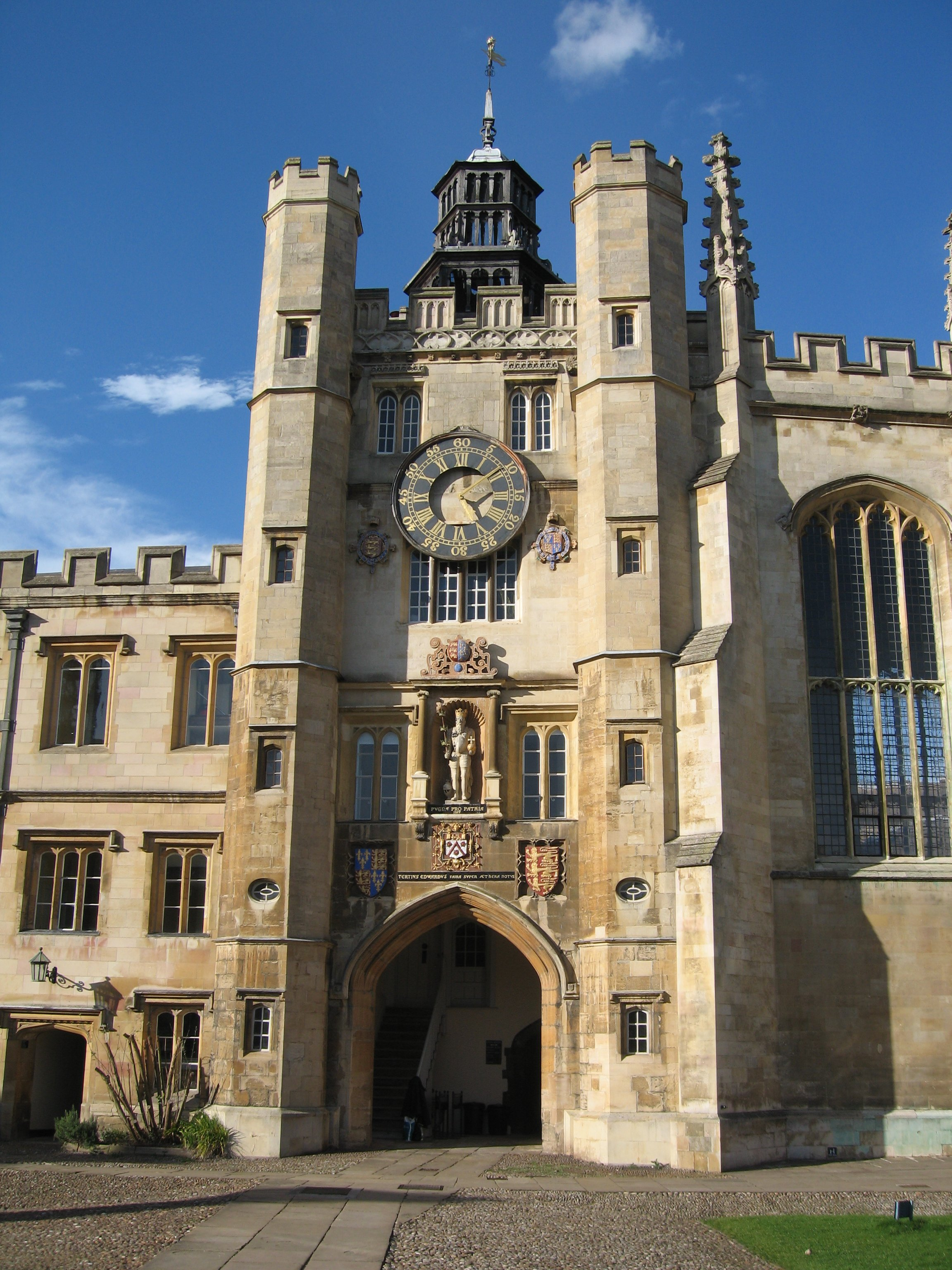
King Edward’s Gate, Great Court, Trinity College, Cambridge

Audio of the clock striking noon, with twelve low and twelve high chimes

Trinity College Clock is a historic pendulum clock in Trinity College, Cambridge. It is housed in one of the oldest buildings in the college, King Edward's Gate, also known as the clock tower. The building was formerly the entrance to King's Hall, a college which merged with Michaelhouse to form Trinity College.

The clock is noted for striking the hour twice, first on a low note (the "Trinity" chime) and then a higher one (the "St John's" chime). This peculiarity was noted by William Wordsworth in his autobiographical poem:

Near me hung Trinity’s loquacious clock,
Who never let the quarters, night or day,
Slip by him unproclaimed, and told the hours
Twice over with a male and female voice.

— William Wordsworth, The Prelude (1850), 3. Residence at Cambridge

A common myth claims that the clock strikes the hour twice, because the fellows of St John's College once complained about its noise.

== History ==
King Edward's Gate, in Trinity Great Court, otherwise known simply as the clock-tower, is one of the oldest buildings in the college. The first clock appears to have been installed in 1610 by Thomas Tennant, of London. The bell has survived to this day and bears the inscription: TRINITAS IN UNITATE RESONAT 1610. RICARDUS HOLD FELD ME FECIT. ("Trinity resounds in unity, 1610. Richard Holdfield made me.")

Between 1726 and 1727, the clock mechanism was given to the village of Orwell, Cambridgeshire when the master, Richard Bentley, provided a new clock and dial plate and three bells.

In 1910, this eighteenth-century clock was replaced with a mechanism by Smith of Derby to a design by Lord Grimthorpe.

== Monitoring project ==
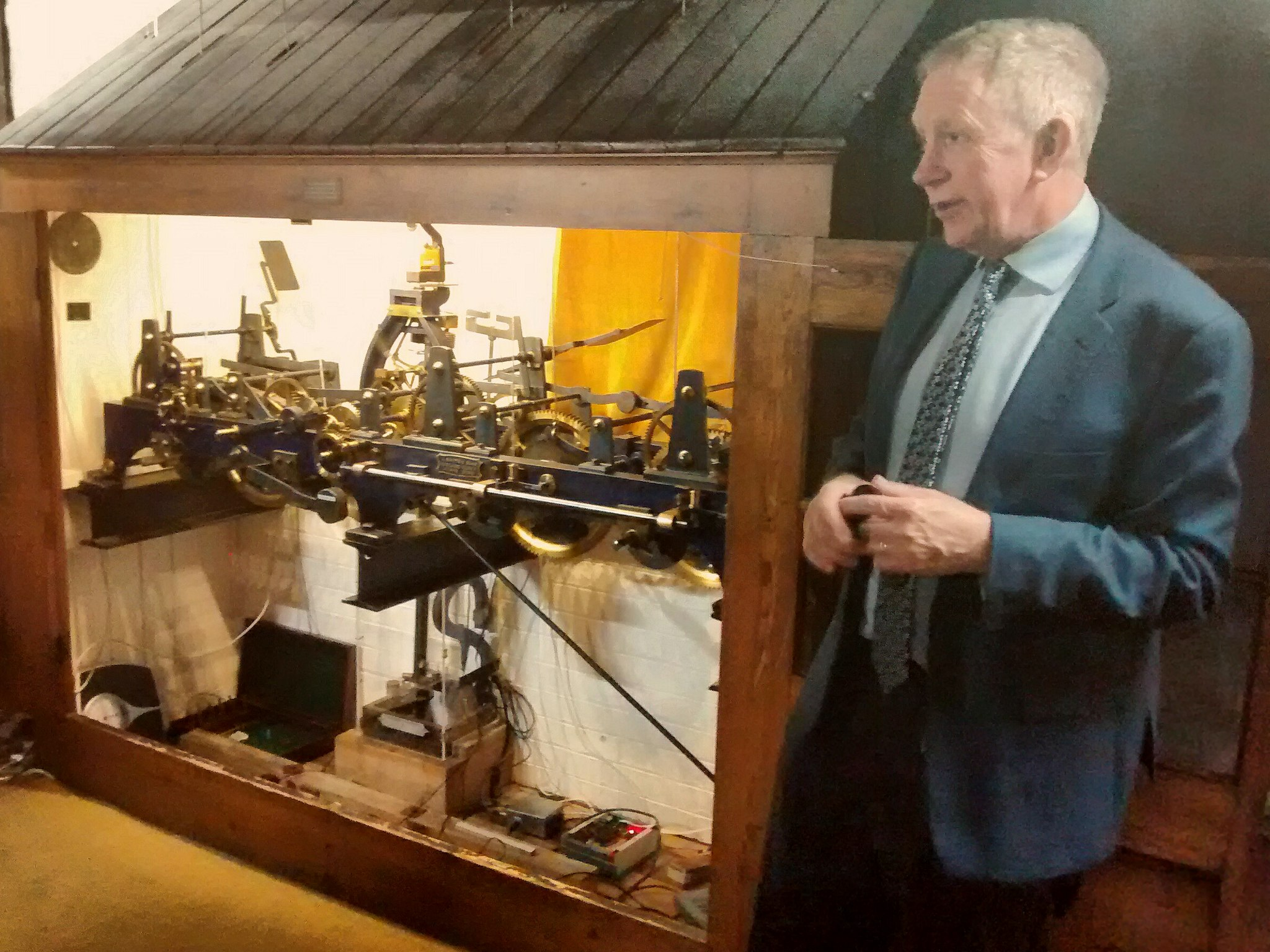
The Trinity College Clock mechanism and the Keeper of the Clock, Dr Hugh Hunt in February 2019

The clock is the subject of a current project coordinated by Dr Hugh Hunt, Fellow of Trinity College Cambridge, calibrating it against the National Physical Laboratory time signal and other variables, including the amplitude of the pendulum, humidity, air temperature, air pressure, and air density. The clock is governed by a temperature-compensated pendulum, 2 metres in length, driven by a three-legged gravity escapement. It is capable of keeping time to better than one second in a month without any intervention, except for winding up its weights at least once a week.
