= Sybil Gordon =

English singer and actress (1902-1981)

Sybil Gordon (22 March 1902 – 17 December 1981) was an English singer and actress. She is best remembered for her performances in Gilbert and Sullivan roles with the D'Oyly Carte Opera Company from 1926 to 1931. Gordon started out as a concert singer. After her career with the D'Oyly Carte company, she moved to Canada, where she broadcast on the radio. In the 1981 film Chariots of Fire, she is misidentified as the fiancée of Olympic runner Harold Abrahams.

== Career ==
Gordon was born Sophia Solomon in Manchester.

Early in her career, Gordon won first prize at the 1923 Blackpool Music Competition, judged by Sir Steuart Wilson. At this time, she was singing as a mezzo-soprano. The following year, as a soprano, she sang regularly in BBC broadcasts of songs by Walford Davies, Roger Quilter and others, and operatic arias by composers including Puccini and Massenet. She also performed in a series of concerts in Manchester. The critic Samuel Langford wrote of her, "Her voice has a decided freshness and purity, and her interpretations, though not greatly varied, have confidence, alertness and charm."

Gordon joined the chorus of the D'Oyly Carte Opera Company in 1926, singing on tour in England and Ireland and in a London season at the Prince's Theatre. Beginning in 1927, she performed several soprano roles with the company: the Plaintiff in Trial by Jury, Celia in Iolanthe, Lady Psyche in Princess Ida, Zorah in Ruddigore and Fiametta in The Gondoliers. Her performance with the company as Lady Psyche at the Savoy Theatre in 1929 was singled out by The Times for particular praise. She sings Fiametta on the 1927 D'Oyly Carte recording of The Gondoliers. She also sang Celia in the radio broadcast of Iolanthe from the Savoy Theatre in February 1930. Gordon left the company at the end of the 1930 season, rejoining briefly in April 1931 as the Plaintiff in Trial by Jury.

In 1931, Gordon moved to Canada. There, from November 1931 to February 1932, she sang in radio broadcasts of all 13 extant Gilbert and Sullivan operas on the CBC, on the C-I-L-sponsored "Opera House of the Air".

She died in Hatch End, Middlesex, at the age of 79.

== Chariots of Fire ==
In the 1981 film Chariots of Fire, Olympic runner Harold Abrahams's fiancée is misidentified as Sybil Gordon (portrayed by Alice Krige). In reality, his fiancée, whom he did not actually meet until a decade after the 1924 Olympics, was Sybil Evers, who sang small roles with D'Oyly Carte from 1930 to 1931. Also in the film, "Sybil Gordon" is depicted as singing Yum-Yum in The Mikado; however, this was not a role that either Gordon or Evers sang with D'Oyly Carte.

== Sources ==
- Rollins, Cyril; R. John Witts (1961). The D'Oyly Carte Opera Company in Gilbert and Sullivan Operas. London: Michael Joseph.
