= Chariots of Fire (relay race) =

Annual relay race in Cambridge, England

Chariots of Fire is an annual relay race, initiated in 1991, that takes place in Cambridge, England. It was inspired by the 1981 film Chariots of Fire, which takes place at the University of Cambridge and depicts the Great Court Run.

Each team of the annual race consists of six runners who must complete six laps through the historic city streets. Runners are sponsored and the money goes to charity. Over 400 teams enter each year. In 2006, the event celebrated its 15th anniversary.
