= Bernard Smith (organ builder) =

German-born organ builder (c.1630–1708)

"Father" Bernard Smith (c. 1630 – 1708) was a German-born master organ maker in England in the late seventeenth century.

Smith, born as Bernhardt Schmidt in Halle, Germany, served his apprenticeship in Germany before emigrating to England in 1667. In 1681 he became the king's organ maker and, in 1699, built an organ for the Banqueting House, Whitehall, which was at that time serving as a Chapel Royal to the court of William and Mary. The organ case is now at the Chapel Royal of St Peter ad Vincula at the Tower of London. Along with his hated rival Renatus Harris he was one of the two most prominent organ builders in late seventeenth-century Britain.

The rivalry between Smith and Harris led to the famous Battle of the Organs in 1684, when both were bidding for the contract to build the new organ for the Temple Church, London. Each man erected an organ in the Temple Church and then hired prominent organists to demonstrate the superiority of their instrument. Smith hired John Blow and Henry Purcell as his organists and won the contest.

Remnants of Smith organs survive at various places in the United Kingdom, though most survivals comprise only the casework. One of the best preserved cases is in the chapel of Trinity College, Cambridge. The organ that is now contained in this case (by Metzler, 1975) contains a number of restored Smith ranks. Other notable Smith cases (this list is not exhaustive) can be found at Christ Church Cathedral, Oxford, Emmanuel College, Cambridge, St Mary the Great, Cambridge, St Paul's Cathedral, London, and the above-mentioned chapel of St Peter ad Vincula. The west front of the organ at Durham Cathedral is preserved in the south aisle of the nave, and the choir organ is now the organ (with some original Smith ranks in use) of the chapel of University College, Durham.

Another surviving example of his work is in St Paul's pro-cathedral, Malta. This organ originated in Chester Cathedral before being installed in Malta in 1844.

Bernard Smith was buried in St Margaret's Church, Westminster, London, on the south side of the chancel, on 20 March 1708. There is no marker or monument. In the burial register he is described as "organ maker in ordinary".
