= Evelyn Montague =

British athlete and journalist

Personal information
- Born: 20 March 1900 Chorlton-cum-Hardy, Manchester, England
- Died: 30 January 1948 (aged 47) North Walsham, Norfolk, England

Sport
- Sport: Athletics
- Event(s): middle distance, steeplechase
- Club: Achilles Club

Evelyn Aubrey Montague (20 March 1900 – 30 January 1948) was an English athlete and journalist. He ran in the 1924 Paris Olympics, placing sixth in the steeplechase race. Montague is portrayed in the 1981 film Chariots of Fire, where he is portrayed by Nicholas Farrell. Contrary to the film, he attended Oxford, not Cambridge, and went by the name Evelyn (EEV-lin) rather than Aubrey.

== Early life and family ==
Evelyn Montague was born in 1900 in Chorlton-cum-Hardy, Lancashire. He was the son of journalist and novelist C. E. Montague and Madeline Scott, and the grandson of C. P. Scott, the long-time editor of the Manchester Guardian.

Montague married in 1932. He and his wife Norah had one child, a son named Andy. She died in 1943.

== Athletic and journalism careers ==
A runner from youth, in 1918 Montague won the mile and the steeplechase at the London AC Schools meeting. Beginning in 1919, he attended Oxford University at Magdalen College, where he studied journalism. He was captain of Oxford's Varsity Cross Country Club, and won the cross-country race against Cambridge (1919–20), and the 3 miles (1920–21).

In 1920, Montague was a founding member of the Achilles Club, the joint Oxford–Cambridge track and field organisation. At the age of 20, he finished fourth in the mile and second in the 4 miles at the 1920 AAA Championships. He was invited to run in the 1920 Olympic 5000 metres, but was unable to accept. From 1921 on, he concentrated on the steeplechase, and finished second to Percy Hodge in that race at the 1921 AAA Championships and finished second again in 1924 and 1925.

Montague was selected for the 1924 Olympic team for Great Britain. At the Games, he placed sixth in the 3000 metre steeplechase, as shown in the film Chariots of Fire, with a time of 9.58.0, coming in 0.4 second after the fifth-place runner.

After the Paris Olympics, Montague went into newspaper journalism. He spent two years as a journalist in Chile, returning to England in 1928. He had one final season on the track in 1930, during which he finished third in the Northern Counties steeplechase.

Montague travelled to the 1936 Berlin Summer Olympics to cover those controversial games as a journalist. During World War II, he became a distinguished war correspondent. He also served as the athletics correspondent of the Manchester Guardian from 1926 to 1947, and was appointed its London editor in 1945.

Montague was the joint organiser — together with javelin champion, Olympic coach and author F. A. M. Webster — of the first AAA Summer Schools at Loughborough.

During the WWII Italian campaign, Montague contracted tuberculosis. He died from the disease in 1948, in North Walsham, Norfolk.

== Personal bests ==
Montague's personal best running times were:

- 3 miles – 14:45.0 (1920)
- Steeplechase – 9:48.0 (1924)

== Chariots of Fire ==
Despite the depiction in the film Chariots of Fire, Montague attended Oxford, and Harold Abrahams attended Cambridge; although they were both Achilles Club members, they were university rivals. Montague wrote to his mother after an Oxford–Cambridge race: "Cambridge won. They chaired Harold Abrahams from the track, and I was just waiting for them to drop him on his arse."

In the years following the Olympics, when Montague and Abrahams were active on athletics boards, they became close friends, and Abrahams was the godfather of Montague's only child. Montague also accompanied Abrahams, who was an official correspondent for the occasion, to the controversial and potentially dangerous (for Abrahams) Nazi-dominated 1936 Berlin Summer Olympics.

Montague played an important role in the making of Chariots of Fire. He had written daily letters to his mother describing his years at Oxford, his athletic training, and the Olympic competition. His son, after reading screenwriter Colin Welland's query article in a London newspaper, offered them to Welland — who used them, and Montague, as a means to introduce scenes and connect events in the film.

== See also ==
- Athletics at the 1924 Summer Olympics – Men's 3000 metre steeplechase
- Great Britain at the 1924 Summer Olympics

== Sources ==
- "Britain's 1924 Olympic Champs Live Again in Chariots of Fire — and Run Away with the Oscars." People. 10 May 1982: Vol. 17 No. 18.
- Evelyn Montague – Biography at Sports-Reference.com
- Ryan, Mark. Running with Fire: The True Story of Chariots of Fire Hero Harold Abrahams. Robson Press, 2012 (paperback). (Original hardback: JR Books Ltd, 2011.)
