= Great Court, Trinity College, Cambridge =

Enclosed courtyard

Coordinates: 52°12′25″N 0°07′01″E

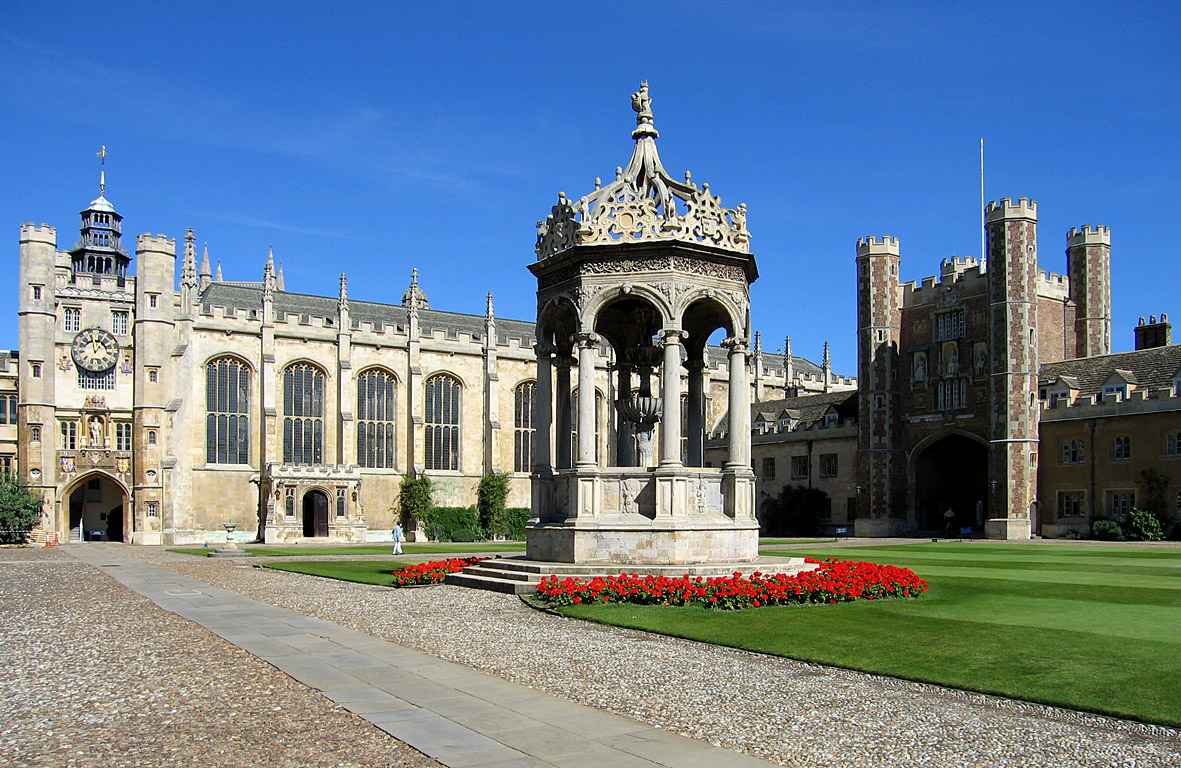
Trinity's Great Court looking north, showing the King's Gate, Chapel, Fountain and the Great Gate.

Great Court is the main court of Trinity College, Cambridge, and reputed to be the largest enclosed courtyard in Europe.

The court was completed by Thomas Nevile, master of the college, in the early years of the 17th century, when he rearranged the existing buildings to form a single court.

== Description ==
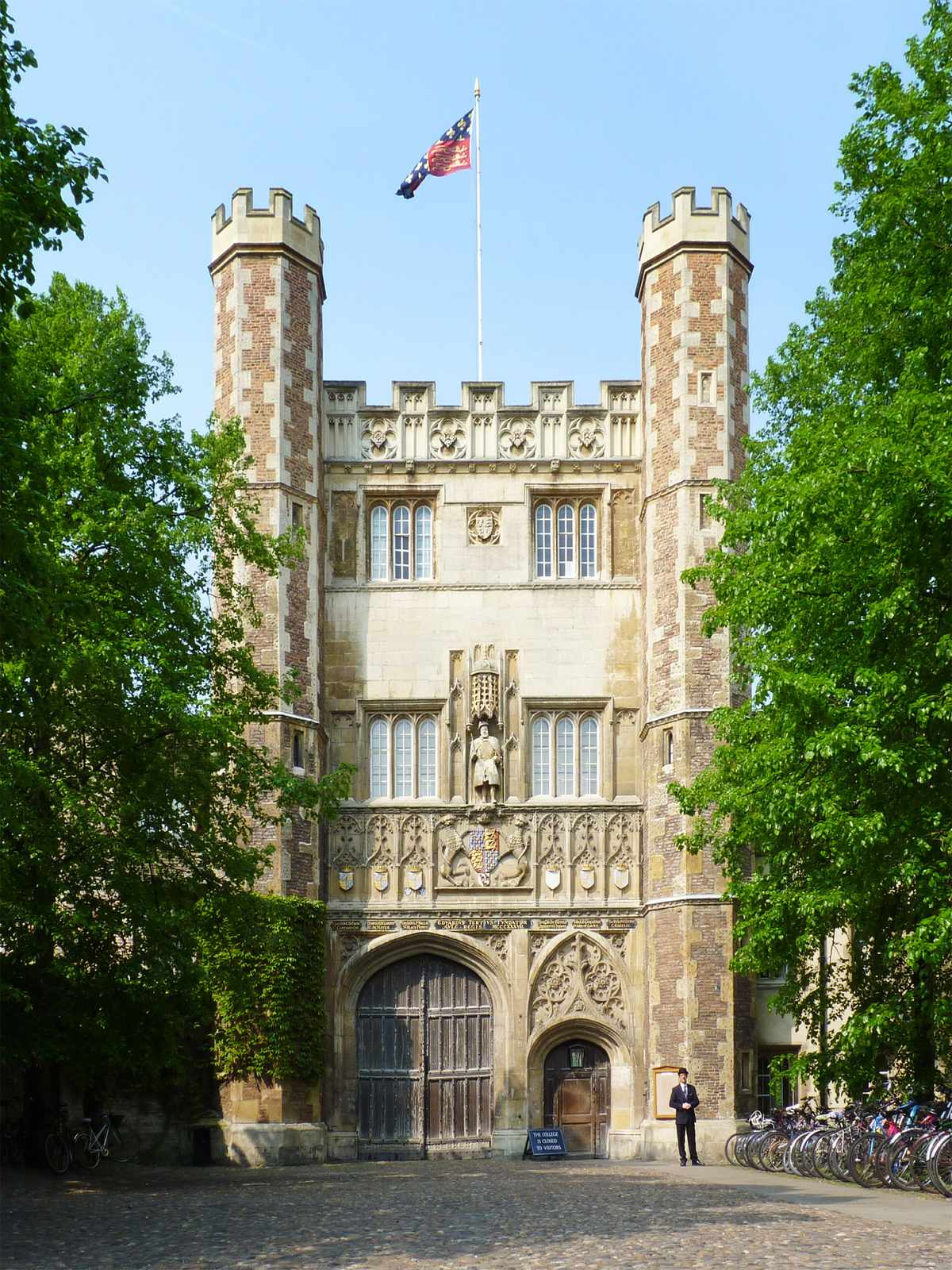
Trinity's main entrance, the Great Gate, leading to the Great Court.

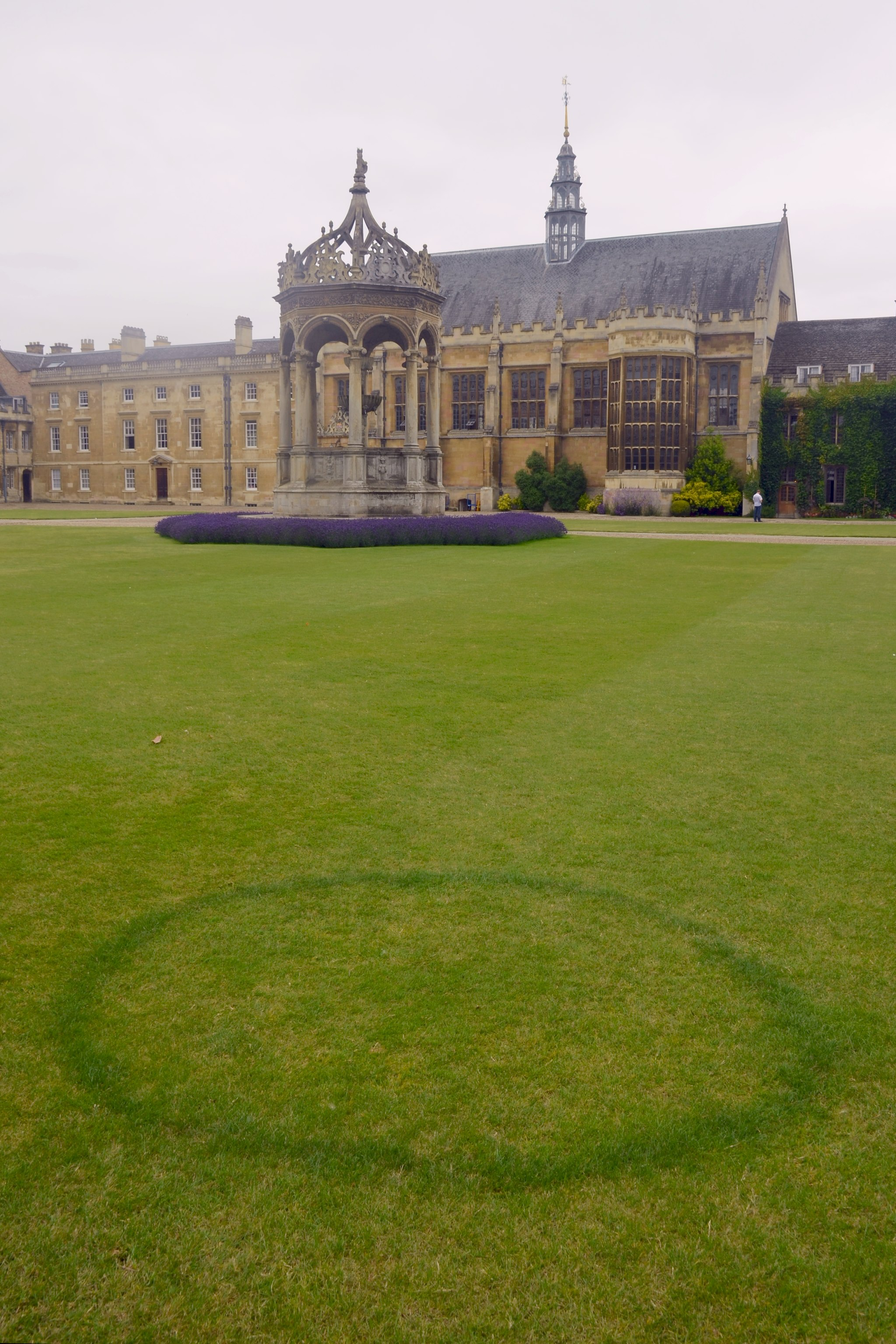
View from the Great Gate of the fountain, hall and a fairy ring.

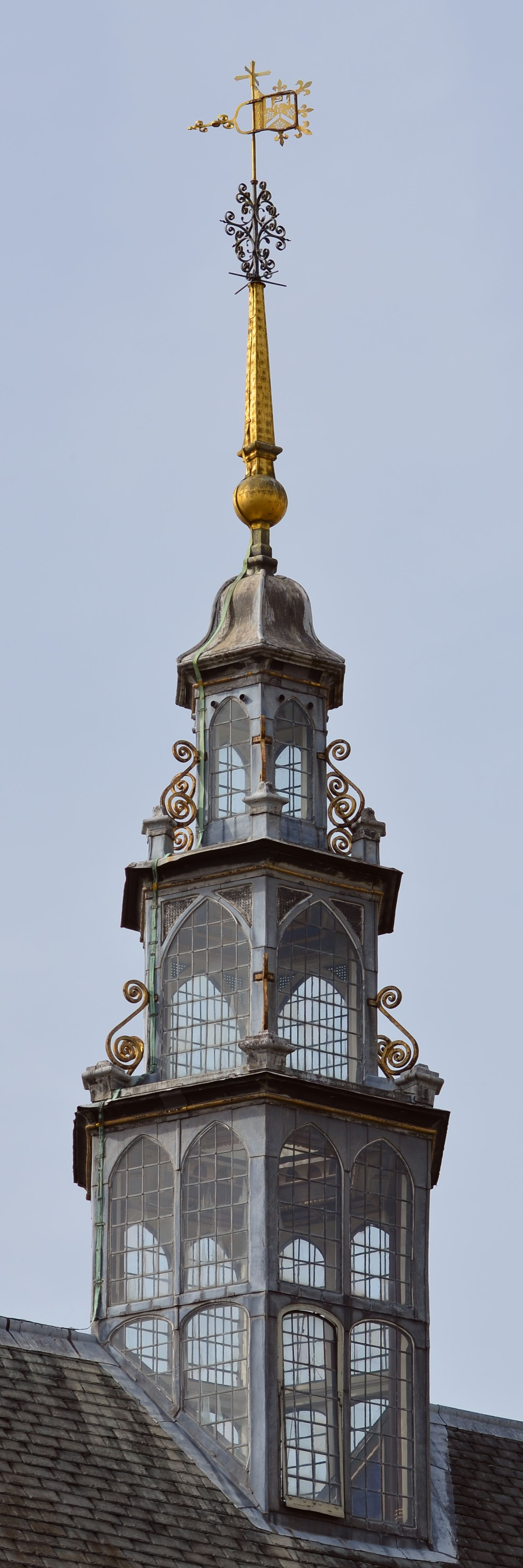
Detail of the lantern atop the dining hall.

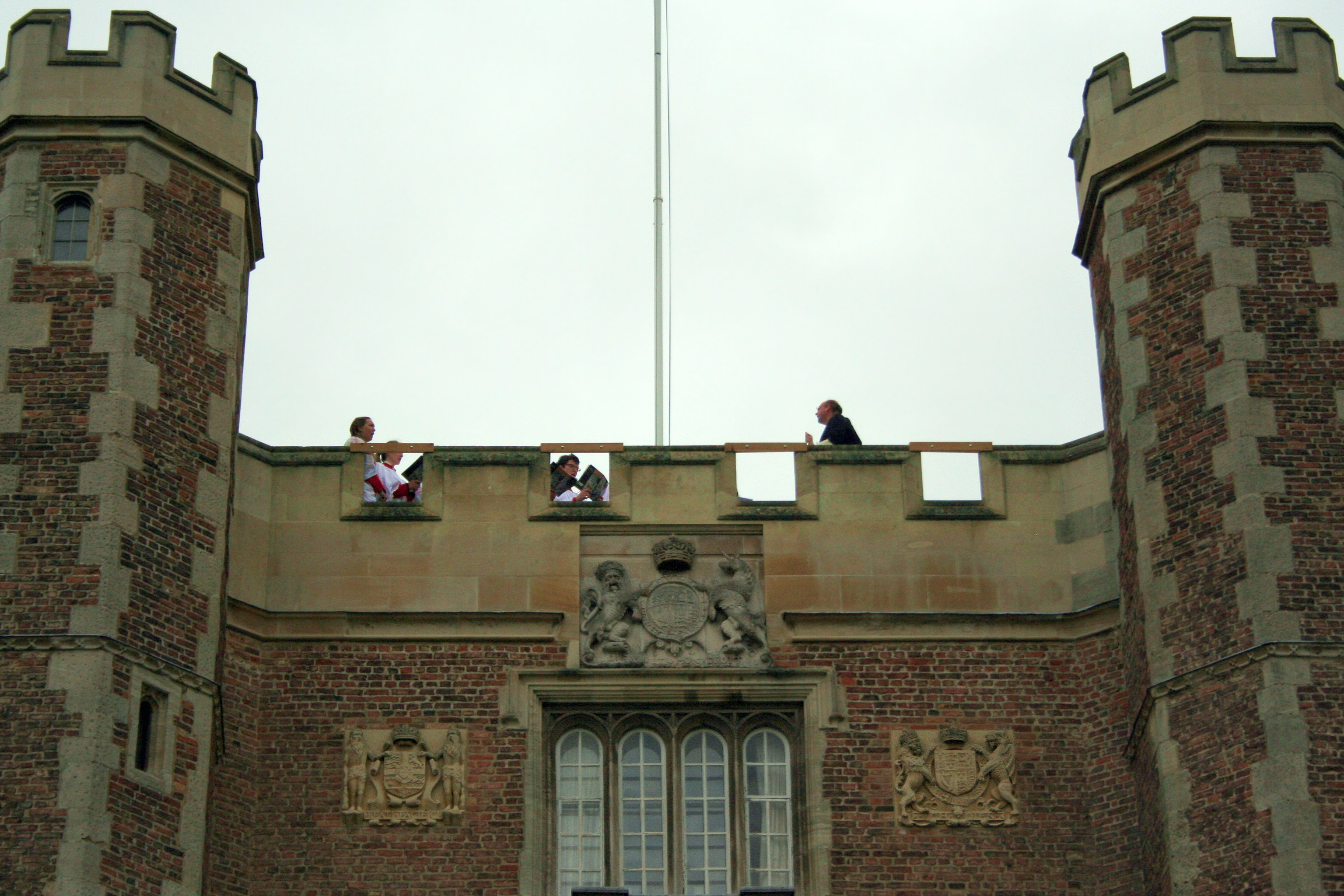
Trinity College Choir singing from the towers of Great Court on 9 June 2013.

Starting in the northeast corner at E staircase, in which Isaac Newton had his rooms, and moving clockwise, one first reaches the Porters' Lodge and Great Gate, begun in 1490 as the entrance to King's Hall and completed in 1535. The Great Gate holds the famous statue of Henry VIII, whose sceptre was replaced by a chair leg by students in the 19th century. Next comes the East Range, and staircases F-K (with J omitted) that contain the college bursary and rooms principally housing fellows of the college. Staircase I leads to Angel Court, containing rooms for students and fellows, and to the college bar.

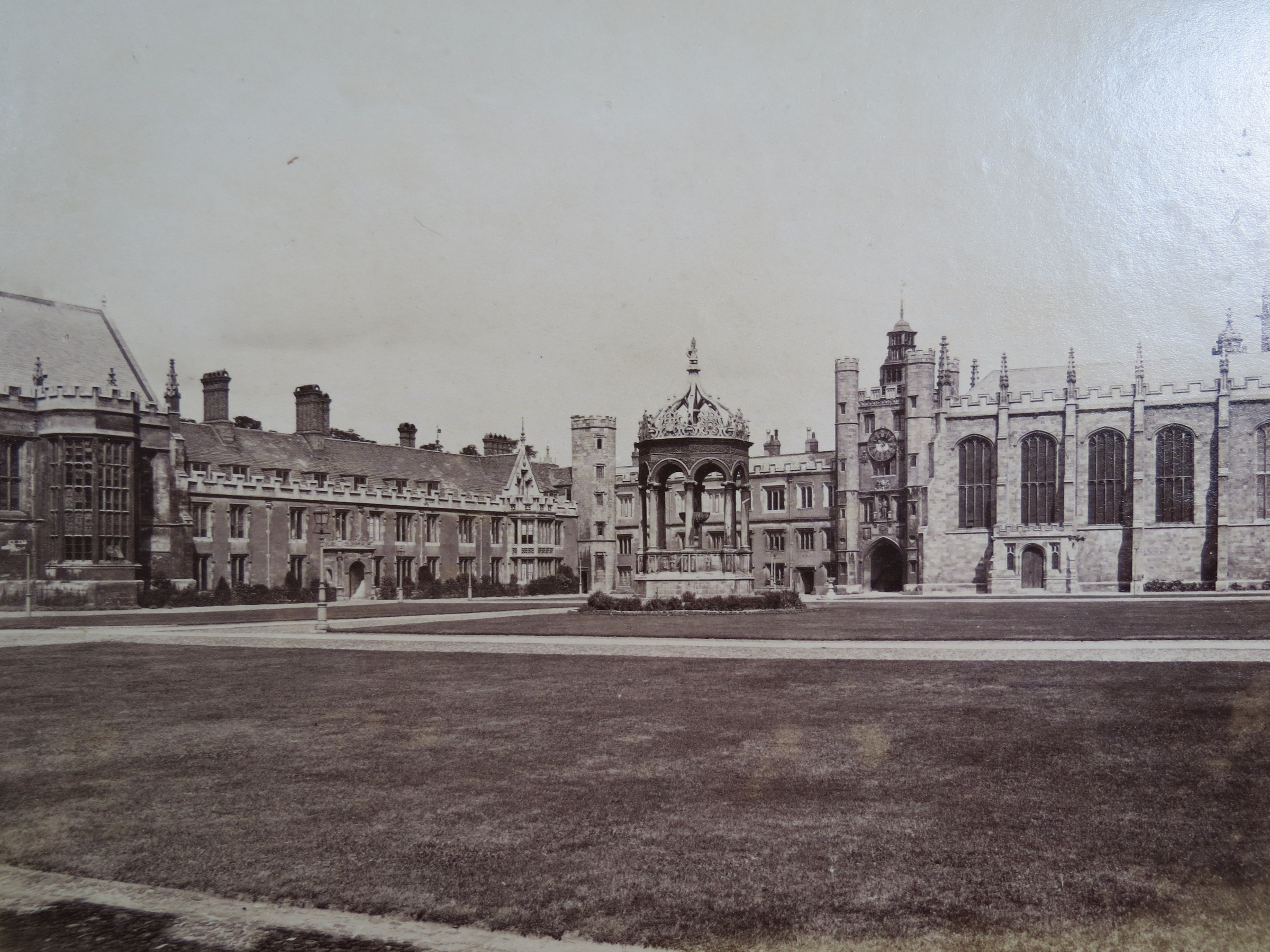
Cambridge University, Great Court, Trinity College

The South Range runs from staircases L–Q with rooms for students and fellows, with Queen's Gate (named after Elizabeth I of England) as its centrepiece. R staircase can be found in a passage leading to Bishop's Hostel, while S staircase is on the left in the passage leading past the Hall into Nevile's Court. The West Range is dominated by the Great Hall, the college's dining hall modelled on that of Middle Temple, and the Master's Lodge.

The fourth side begins with staircases A–C, before reaching King's Gate (also called Edward III Gateway), and the entrance to the oldest part of the college, the remaining surviving buildings of King's Hall. Originally built on the site of the current sundial in the middle of the court, Nevile moved it 20 metres north when completing the court. King's Gate also houses the famous Trinity College Clock that chimes every 15 minutes and strikes the hour twice. The clock was installed at the request of Master of Trinity Richard Bentley in the 17th century, striking each hour once for the college of his mastership, Trinity, and once for his alma mater, St John's College, Cambridge.

In the centre of the court is an ornate fountain, built during Nevile's time, and fed by a pipe from Conduit Head in west Cambridge.

== The Great Court Run ==
Many have tried to run the 339 metres (371 yards) around the court in the time it takes to strike 12 o'clock (actually 24 chimes owing to an old tradition). The run was recreated, filmed in Eton College rather than Trinity, in the 1981 film Chariots of Fire.

Students traditionally attempt to complete the circuit, in what is known as the Great Court Run, on midday before the Matriculation Dinner. Only three people are believed to have actually completed the run in the time, the first being Lord Burghley in 1927. Contrary to the depiction in Chariots of Fire, Harold Abrahams never attempted the Run.

Sebastian Coe and Steve Cram attempted the feat in a charity race on 29 October 1988. Coe's time was reported by Norris McWhirter to have been 45.52 seconds, but it was actually 46.0 seconds as confirmed by the video tape, while Cram's was 46.3 seconds. The clock on that day took 44.4 seconds and video confirms that Coe was approximately 12 metres short of his finish line when the fateful final stroke occurred. There is some debate over the dying sounds of the bell being included in the striking time, which would allow Coe's run to be claimed as successful. The event was organized by 36-year-old undergraduate Nigel McCrery and raised £50,000 for the Great Ormond Street Hospital for Children.

In 2007, Sam Dobin was seen to 'beat' the clock in a time of 42.77s, improving on his 3rd-place finish the previous year. Dobin's achievement received national newspaper coverage which reported it as the fastest time in the history of the race, beating Burghley and Coe's efforts.

From 2012 to 2014, Cornelius Roemer won the run three times in a row, and beat the clock in his 2014 run.

In 2019, George Mears beat the clock, although as he acknowledged "the clock was slow this year" meaning his time of 48.12 was sufficient.

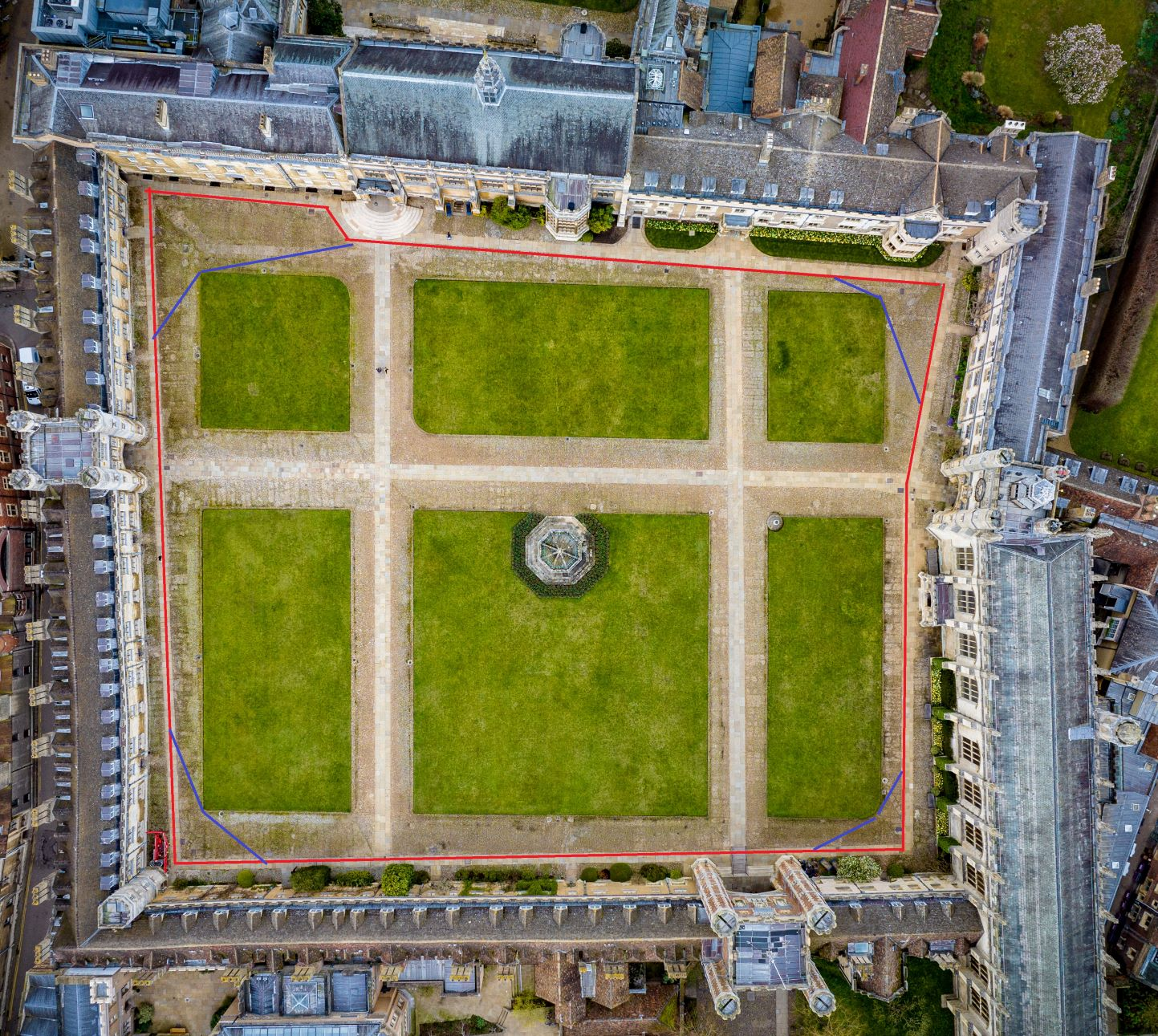
View showing in red the path of the Great Court Run and in blue the shortcuts on the cobbles

The route taken by competitors around the court was temporarily changed — allowing running on the cobbles rather than the path — cutting the distance down to 297m (the perimeter of the grass) as opposed to 341m (the perimeter of the cobbles). This is about 13% shorter, making the accomplishment significantly more attainable. From 2017 onwards, the organisers decided to enforce the original route for competitive runners, restoring the historical difficulty of the race.

Each year, a costumed run is also held for all non-competitive participants, and the best costumes are selected by the Dean of Trinity College.

Recent winners:

- 2000: Adrian Hemery
- 2001: Mike Collins
- 2002: Huw Watson (AUS)
- 2003: Calum T.M. Nicholson
- 2004: Andy Owen (Guest)
- 2005: Chris Wilson
- 2006: Dany Gammall
- 2007: Sam Dobin (beat the clock on the cobbles route)
- 2008: Edgar Engel
- 2009: Cancelled due to poor weather conditions
- 2010: Henry Husband
- 2011: Steven Karp (CAN)
- 2012: Cornelius Roemer
- 2013: Cornelius Roemer
- 2014: Cornelius Roemer (beat the clock on the cobbles route)
- 2015: Jiří Kučera (CZE)
- 2016: Patrick Bradbury
- 2021: Peter Molloy
- 2023: Bence Hervay (beat the clock) with a time of 49.72s

David Cecil, the only man to achieve the Great Court Run prior to 2007, and Sebastian Coe, the man who came closest to achieving the feat between Cecil's and Dobin's successes, both achieved the distinctions of Olympic Champion, Member of both Houses of Parliament, and Chairman of the London Olympics Organising Committee (David Cecil at the 1948 Olympics, Sebastian Coe at the 2012 Olympics).

Other factors affect the timing of the Great Court Run. The speed at which the bells strike is governed by a mechanical fly, details of which are recorded by The Trinity Clock Monitoring Project. The fly uses air resistance to govern the speed at which the striking mechanism turns and consequently the speed varies, depending mainly on the air density; the duration to the striking of twelve depends on the meteorological conditions on the race day. On a cold, dry, high-pressure day the bells strike more slowly than on a warm, humid low-pressure day. This can cause variation of as much as 5 seconds to the normal time of around 48 seconds. The official run takes place in October, when the likely variation is a more modest one second. Runners will have the best chance of completing the circuit before the bells have finished on a cold winter's day. The chime speed is also affected by the number of days since the chimes were last wound, three being optimal.

== Caucus Race ==
A less structured event, the Caucus Race, occurs during the summer long vacation when undergraduates who have summer courses gather all around Great Court just before two o'clock dressed in their academic robes. Great Court is divided into six rectangular lawns and the objective of the race is to circumnavigate all six individually and in all their combinations, which requires a mathematical brain to plan well, and end at the fountain. The entry fee is a pint of beer. As soon as the clock starts to strike everyone starts running around whatever route they have chosen, much to the consternation of the tourists. On reaching the fountain everyone gets a prize of a pint of beer. It has been done in 14 minutes but that is exceptional.

== Chapel ==
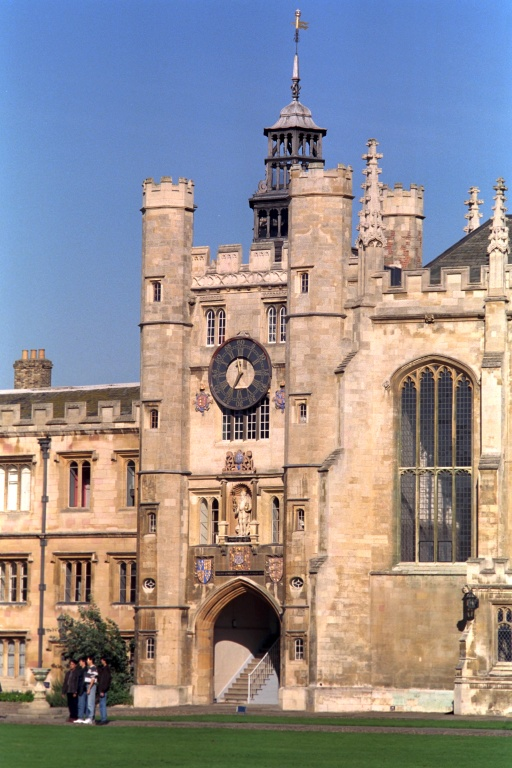
Clock tower in Great Court

The final part of the court is completed by the chapel, begun by Mary I in 1554 in memory of her father. The ante-chapel contains statues of many famous Trinity men, including Roubiliac's sculpture of Isaac Newton, Thomas Woolner's piece of William Whewell and the altarpiece is Benjamin West's St Michael and the Devil.

The chapel contains a fine organ built by the Swiss firm of Metzler in 1975 — one of only two instruments by this respected maker in Great Britain. It is contained within the restored late seventeenth-century case built by perhaps England's most famous organ builder "Father" Smith. The Metzler organ incorporates some surviving pipes from this instrument.

== Dimensions ==
The exact external dimensions of the four sides of Great Court are:

- South — 87.8m (82.5m)
- West — 105.2m (99.9m)
- North — 78.3m (69.4m)
- East — 99.4m (88.9m)

which enclose an area of approximately 1.8 acres (7,300 square metres). (The figures given in parentheses are the distances run on the flagstones for the Great Court Run)

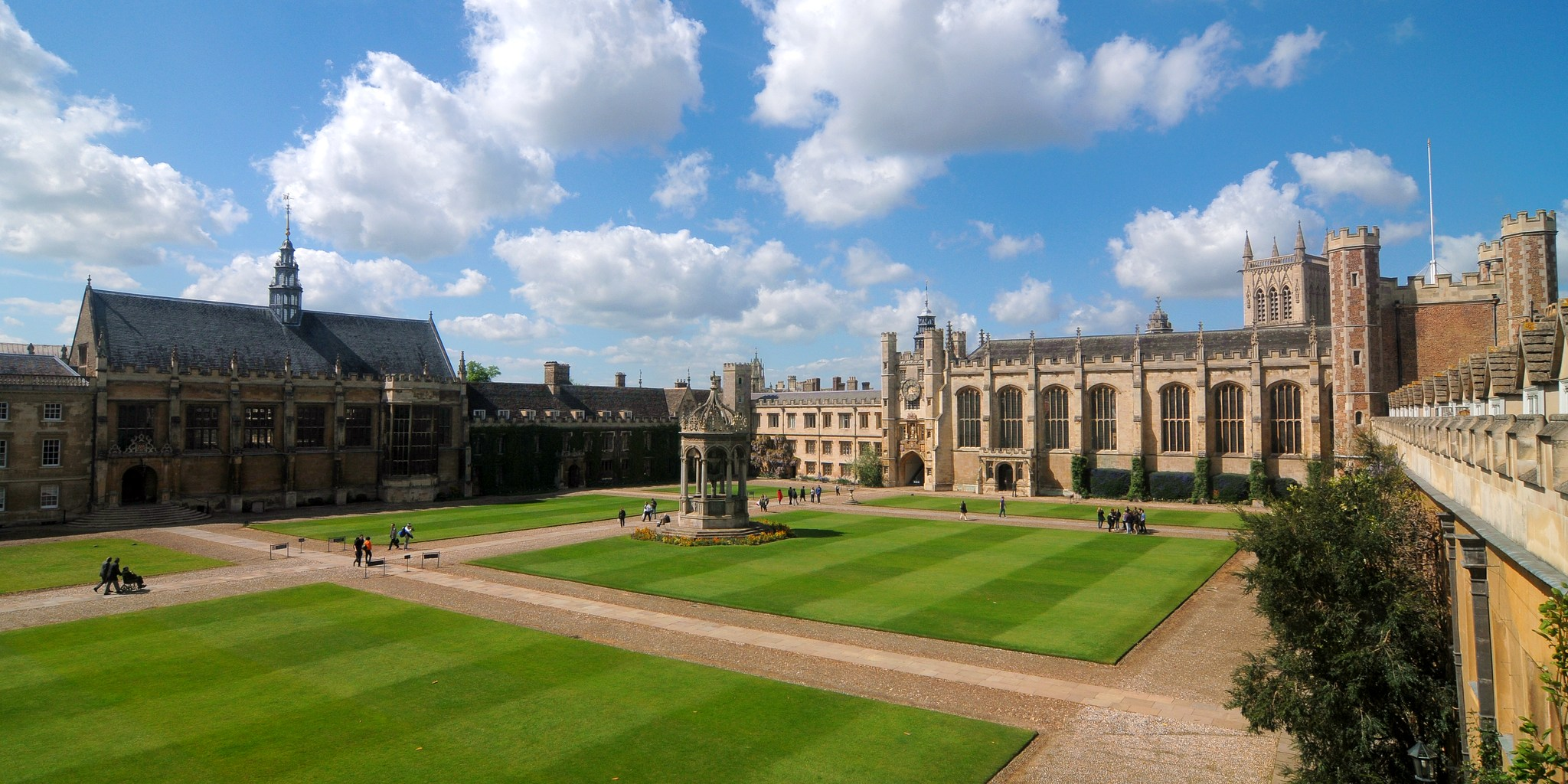
Great Court, with (from left to right) its dining hall, Master's Lodge, fountain, clock tower, chapel and Great Gate.
