= Sybil Evers =

English singer and actress (1904-1963)

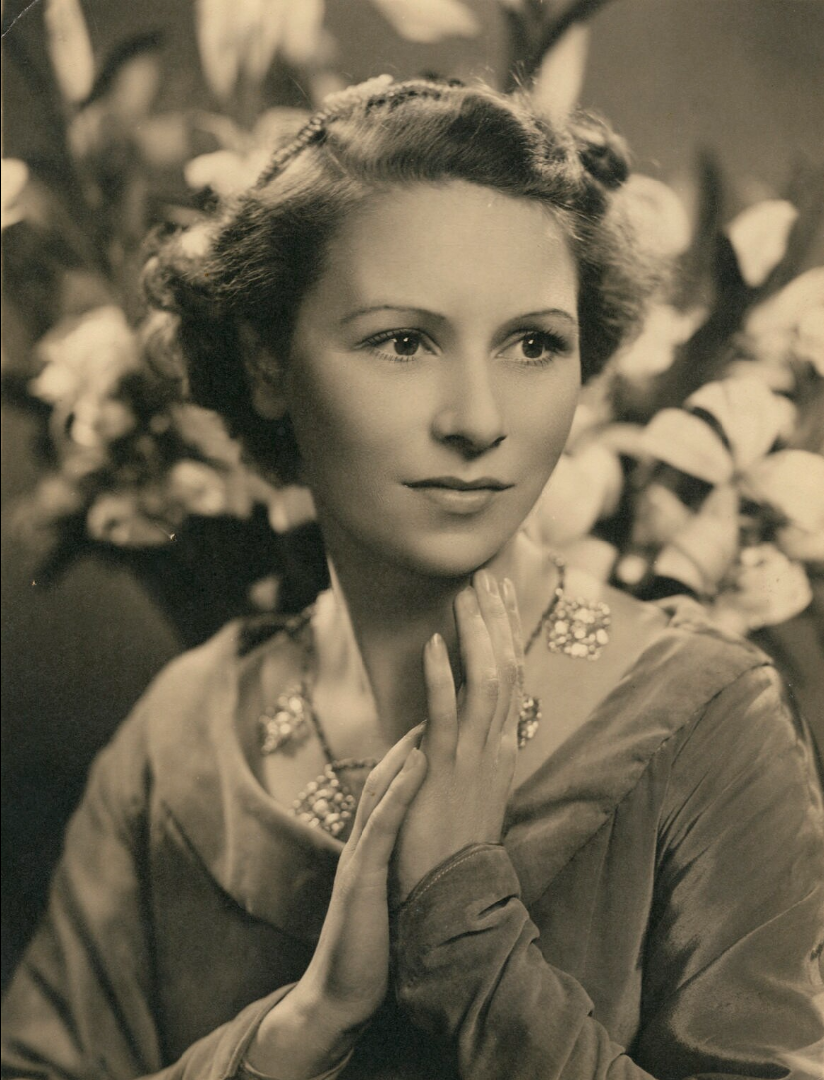
Sybil Evers in 1937

Sybil Marjorie Evers (19 June 1904 – 24 June 1963) was an English singer and actress. She performed in operettas, operas and plays in London from the early 1920s through the late 1930s, including on BBC radio and television. She married Olympic champion runner Harold Abrahams.

== Early life and education ==
Evers was born and raised in Rugby, Warwickshire. Her father Claude was a housemaster at the Rugby School for boys. Her mother Jessie was a talented water-colourist and instilled a love for the arts in Sybil, who quickly became interested in musical comedy, producing playlets and composing tunes as a child. Evers trained as a singer at the Royal College of Music.

== Career ==
Evers made her professional stage debut on 9 July 1924, as Susan in Ralph Vaughan Williams' Hugh the Drover, a romantic ballad opera in two acts, at the Parry Opera Theatre. In 1927, at Daly's Theatre, she was Nixie in a single performance of The Ladder, a musical fantasy.

From March 1930 to September 1931, Evers sang small roles at the D'Oyly Carte Opera Company. These included Kate in The Pirates of Penzance, the Lady Saphir in Patience, Leila in Iolanthe, Peep-Bo in The Mikado and Vittoria in The Gondoliers. Occasionally she substituted for Marjorie Eyre in the larger mezzo-soprano roles of Tessa in The Gondoliers and Mad Margaret in Ruddigore.

Following her stint with D'Oyly Carte, Evers often alternated between the Webber-Douglas and the Chanticleer opera companies. She appeared in operettas, operas and plays in a variety of London venues. In 1934 she entertained the seven-year-old Princess Elizabeth at the Cambridge Theatre in Ever So Long Ago, a children's play by Brian Hill and Laura Wildig; the piece was reportedly the first play seen by the princess. At the Open Air Theatre in 1934, she played the Lady in Milton's Comus. The Times wrote, "Miss Sybil Evers ... was the very incarnation of Milton's idea of the queen-hood of innocence, and her first entrance onto an empty stage was pure beauty." In the mid-1930s, Evers also sang Susanna in The Marriage of Figaro. One reviewer noted, "Figaro being what it is, a combination of 'opera buffa' and sophisticated comedy of manners, those who perform it must be able not only to sing well but also to act well. ... For Susanna we have Miss Sybil Evers and she is entrancing. She also knows a thing or two about acting and oh, the difference to us!"

In January 1937, Evers played the title role in Rutland Boughton's The Lily Maid at the Winter Garden Theatre. In April and May 1937, in honour of the coronation of King George VI, she sang in three performances of Parsifal at Covent Garden, as one of the six Flowermaidens. The performances were recorded for posterity but not released commercially. Evers also performed at the Criterion and Arts Theatres, and in December 1938 she was Hansel in Humperdinck's opera Hansel and Gretel at the Scala Theatre.

By the early 1930s, Evers also sang for the BBC, as second soprano of the full-time octet, the Wireless Singers. She later sang for the BBC music production department, which gave performances of light operas. In 1937, she performed the role of Lucy Lockit in the BBC's televised production of The Beggar's Opera.

== Personal life ==
Evers' first marriage was to publisher Noel Brack in 1926. That marriage soon ended in divorce.

In early 1934, Sybil met the athlete Harold Abrahams, and they began a passionate on-and-off romance. According to his biographer Mark Ryan, Abrahams had a fear of commitment and old-fashioned ideas about the role of women in marriage, but he was able to overcome these, and the couple wed in December 1936. In the 1981 film Chariots of Fire, Evers is misidentified as D'Oyly Carte soprano Sybil Gordon (portrayed by Alice Krige), and the film portrays the couple as meeting a decade earlier than they actually did. Also in the film, "Sybil Gordon" is depicted as singing Yum-Yum in The Mikado. This was not a role that either Gordon or Evers sang with the D'Oyly Carte, although Evers' relative Elliot Evers, in a 1974 book called Butterflies in Camphor, noted that "Her charm as one of the three pretty maids from school [Peep-Bo] in The Mikado is still remembered."

As a result of a serious illness and surgery in her youth, Evers could not have children, so Abrahams and Evers adopted an eight-week-old son, Alan, in 1942, and a nearly three-year-old daughter, Sue, in 1946. Sue later married Pat Pottle. Before and during the Second World War, Evers and Abrahams also fostered two Jewish refugees: a German boy called Ken Gardner (born Kurt Katzenstein), and an Austrian girl named Minka.

== Death and legacy ==
Evers died in 1963 at the age of 59. Soon afterwards, her husband Harold Abrahams set up a trust for the Sybil Evers Memorial Prize for Singing, which operated from 1965 to 1995. It was an annual cash prize awarded to the best female singer in her last year at the Webber Douglas School of Singing and Dramatic Art. Abrahams, a former Olympic gold medalist runner, also set up the Sybil Abrahams Memorial Trophy, presented each year from 1964 onward at Buckingham Palace by the Duke of Edinburgh, President of the British Amateur Athletics Association, to the best British woman athlete. Evers was buried at Saint John the Baptist Churchyard in Great Amwell, Hertfordshire. When Abrahams died in 1978, he was buried in the same grave.
