= Sam Mussabini =

English athletics coach

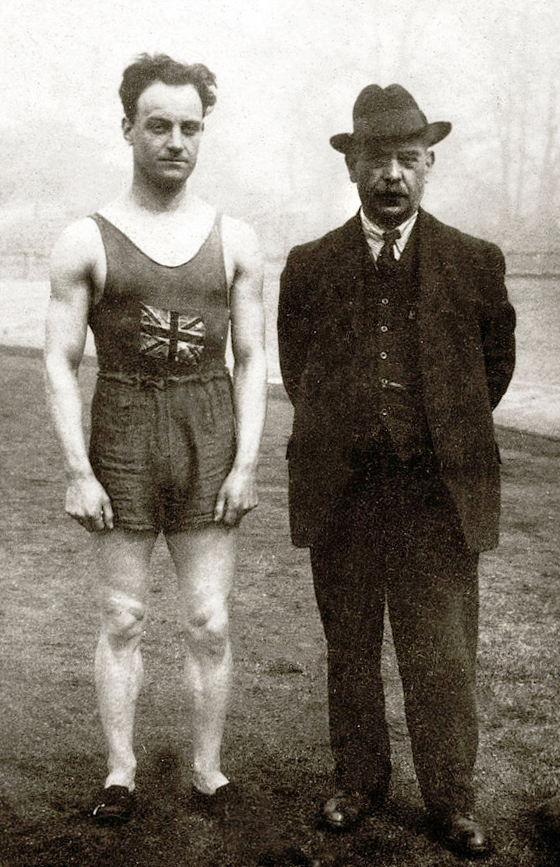
Willie Applegarth and Sam Mussabini at the 1912 Olympics

Scipio Africanus "Sam" Mussabini (6 August 1867 – 12 March 1927) was an English athletics coach best known for his work with Harold Abrahams. In total, he led athletes to eleven medals over five Olympic Games. However, in an era where amateurism was prized, he was not officially recognised because he was a professional coach.

== Early life and career ==
Mussabini was born in Blackheath, London to a family of Syrian, Italian and French descent. Mussabini's father, Neocles Gaspard Mussabini (1827–1915), was born in Turkey to a Syrian father and Italian mother. Mussabini's mother, Aline Farcat (1839–1914), was French. The Mussabini family was Christian and originally from Damascus, Syria. Mussabini's great-grandfather was a Syrian merchant who had altered his original surname, Mussa, to the Italian-sounding Mussabini. Mussabini's great-uncle, Antonio Mussabini, was the Archbishop of the Roman Catholic Archdiocese of İzmir from 1838 to 1861. Mussabini was educated in France, and later followed his father into journalism. In the 1890s he was also a professional sprinter for about five years. In 1894 he coached Bert Harris to the first professional cycling championship the same year he was employed as a cycling coach by the bicycle tyre company Dunlop Pneumatic Tyre Company.

Mussabini played billiards to a high standard and reported on matches as a sports journalist during the winter months. In 1897 he co-authored a technical book on billiards and began writing articles for a billiards journal. In 1902, he became its assistant editor and later the joint proprietor and editor. In 1904 he wrote a two-volume book on the technicalities of billiards. He was also one of the top billiard referees.

== Olympic athlete coaching ==
It has been widely stated that he coached the South African sprinter Reggie Walker to a gold medal at the 1908 Olympic Games in London, but Walker was actually coached by former sprinter Sam Wisdom. Mussabini coached further gold medal winners at the 1912 Olympic Games, including Willie Applegarth. He was appointed as full-time coach by Polytechnic Harriers from 1913 until his death from diabetes in 1927 aged 59.

He brought a systematic approach to coaching, rather than just being a masseur. For example, he used the techniques of Eadweard Muybridge to photograph runners' actions and techniques at the finish.

At the 1920 Olympic Games in Antwerp, Belgium, he coached Albert Hill to two gold medals in the 800 m and 1500 m, and Harry Edward, third in the 100 m. He led Harold Abrahams to win a gold medal in the 100 m and silver in the 4 × 100 m at the 1924 Olympic Games in Paris, France.

== Legacy and honours ==
Mussabini's success at the 1924 Olympics was portrayed in the film Chariots of Fire in which Mussabini is played by Ian Holm. After filming, Holm exchanged letters with living relatives of Mussabini concerned about accuracy.

His trainees won further medals at the 1928 Olympic Games after his death.

In 1998, the Mussabini Medal was created, to celebrate the contribution of coaches of UK performers who have achieved outstanding success on the world stage. In 2011, Sam Mussabini was inducted into the England Athletics Hall of Fame.

English Heritage installed a blue plaque at 84 Burbage Road, Herne Hill, on 11 July 2012. The house was Mussabini's home from 1911 until about 1916 and backs on to the Herne Hill Stadium, where he worked as a cycling and athletics coach from the 1890s until his death and trained several medal-winning Olympic athletes, including the young Harold Abrahams. The plaque was unveiled by Lord Terence Higgins, who competed in the 1948 and 1952 Olympics, and Ben Cross, who played Abrahams in the film Chariots of Fire.

Mussabini was quoted as saying, "Only think of two things – the gun and the tape. When you hear the one, just run like hell until you break the other."

== Archives ==
Sam Mussabini's papers are held at the Cadbury Research Library (University of Birmingham), along with the papers of his father, Neocles. This collection includes material related to Neocles Mussabini's journalistic career at the Pall Mall Gazette, during the era that its editor W. T. Stead was involved with the Eliza Armstrong scandal.
