= Harold Abrahams =

English track and field athlete (1899-1978)

Harold Abrahams CBE
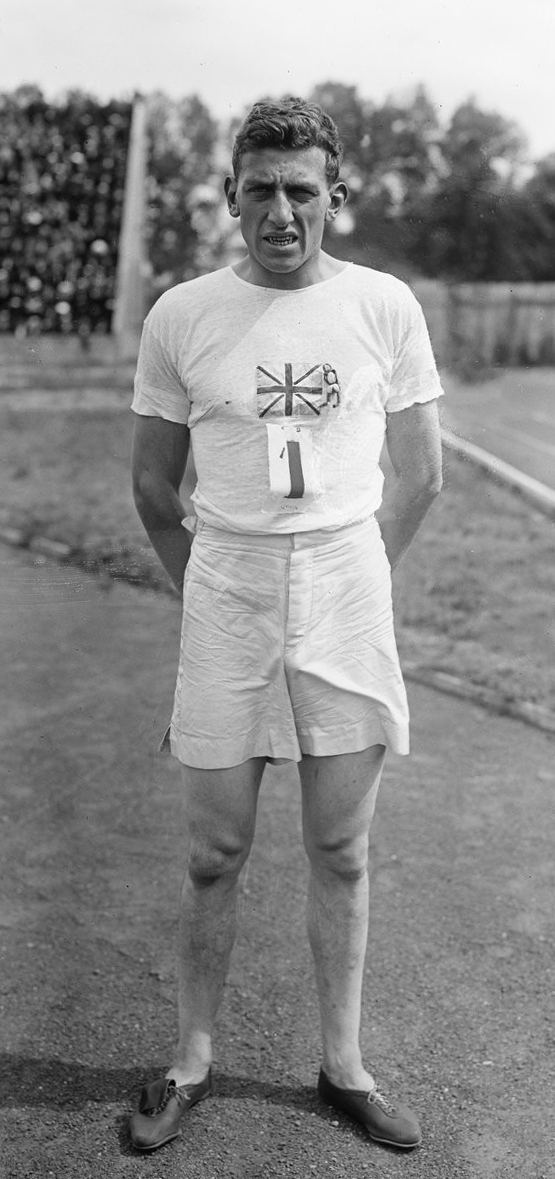
- Abrahams in June 1921

Personal information
- Full name: Harold Maurice Abrahams
- Born: 15 December 1899 Bedford, Bedfordshire, England
- Died: 14 January 1978 (aged 78) Enfield, London, England
- Resting place: St John the Baptist, Great Amwell
- Education: University of Cambridge
- Occupations: Lawyer, journalist
- Height: 6 ft 0 in (183 cm)
- Weight: 165 lb (75 kg)
- Spouse: Sybil Evers (m. 1936; died 1963)

Sport
- Country: Great Britain
- Sport: Track and field
- Events: 100–400 m, long jump
- University team: Cambridge University Athletics Club
- Club: Achilles Club
- Coached by: Sam Mussabini

Achievements and titles
- Personal bests: 100 yd – 9.9 (1924); 100 m – 10.6 (1924); 200 m – 21.9 (1924); 440 yd – 50.8 (1923); LJ – 7.38 m (1924)
Medal record
Representing Great Britain
Olympic Games
| Gold medal – first place | 1924 Paris | 100 metres |
| Silver medal – second place | 1924 Paris | 4 × 100 m relay |

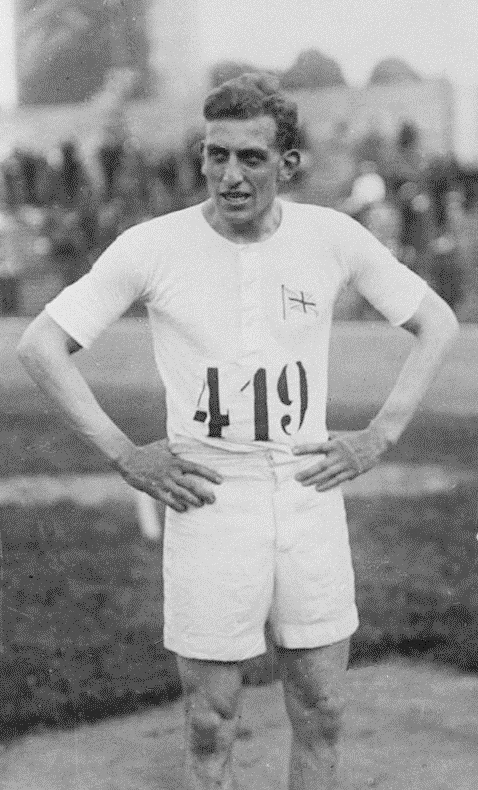
Abrahams at the 1924 Olympics

Harold Maurice Abrahams (15 December 1899 – 14 January 1978) was an English track and field athlete. He was Olympic champion in 1924 in the 100 metres sprint, a feat depicted in the 1981 film Chariots of Fire.

== Early life and education ==
Abrahams's father, Isaac, was a Jewish immigrant from Polish Lithuania, then part of the Russian Empire since the Partitions of Poland. He worked as a financier, and settled in Bedford with his Welsh Jewish wife, Esther Isaacs. Harold was born in Bedford in 1899. His eldest brother was the physician Sir Adolphe Abrahams (1883–1967), the founder of British sport medicine. His middle brother was another British Olympic athlete, long jumper Sir Sidney Abrahams (1885–1957).

Abrahams was educated at Bedford School and Repton School, then both all-boys independent schools. Before attending university, Abrahams served in the British Army. Having been a cadet, he was commissioned in the Bedfordshire Regiment as a temporary second lieutenant on 5 March 1919; he relinquished his commission on 1 September 1921 having completed his period of service.

He studied at Gonville and Caius College, Cambridge, from 1919 to 1923. At Cambridge, he was a member of the Cambridge University Athletics Club (of which he was president 1922–1923), Cambridge University Liberal Club, the University Pitt Club, and the Gilbert and Sullivan Society. After university he trained as a lawyer.

Abrahams was also a member of the Achilles Club, a track and field club formed in 1920 by and for past and present representatives of Oxford and Cambridge universities. One of the club's founding members was Evelyn Montague, who like Abrahams is also portrayed in the 1981 film Chariots of Fire.

== Athletics ==
Abrahams had been a sprinter and long jumper since his youth. He continued to compete in running while at Cambridge. Abrahams earned a place in the 1920 Olympic team, but was eliminated in the quarter-finals of both the 100 m and the 200 m, and finished 20th in the long jump. He was also part of the British relay team that took fourth place in the 4 × 100 m.

The following year, Abrahams finished second behind Harry Edward in the 100 yards and 220 yards events at the 1921 AAA Championships. He became the national long jump champion after winning the AAA Championships title at the 1923 AAA Championships.

After graduating from Cambridge, he employed Sam Mussabini, a professional coach, who improved his style and training techniques in preparation for the 1924 Olympics in Paris, France.

For six months, Mussabini emphasised the 100 metres at Abrahams's direction, with the 200 metres as secondary. Through vigorous training, Abrahams perfected his start, stride and form. Abrahams won both the 100 yards and long jump titles at the 1924 AAA Championships and one month before the 1924 Games, Abrahams set the English record in the long jump 24 feet 2 1/2 inches (7.38 m), a record which stood for the next 32 years. The same day he ran the 100-yard dash in 9.6 seconds, but the time was not submitted as a record because the track was on a slight downhill.

At the 1924 Summer Games, Abrahams won the 100 m in a time of 10.6 seconds, beating all the American favourites, including the 1920 gold-medal winner Charley Paddock. In third place was Arthur Porritt, later Governor-General of New Zealand and Queen's Surgeon. The Paris Olympics 100 m dash took place at 7 p.m. on 7 July 1924, and Abrahams and Porritt dined together at 7 p.m. on 7 July every year thereafter, until Abrahams's death in 1978. Teammate Eric Liddell, the British 100-yard dash record holder at that time, declined to compete in the Paris 100 m because one of the heats for the event was held on a Sunday. Both Liddell and Abrahams competed in the final of the 200 m race, with Liddell finishing third and Abrahams sixth. Liddell went on to win the gold medal in the 400 metres. Abrahams was the opening runner for the British 4 × 100 m team, which won the silver medal. He did not compete in the long jump.

== Later life ==
In May 1925, Abrahams broke his leg while long-jumping, ending his athletic career. He returned to his legal career as a barrister. In 1928, he was team captain of the British Olympic team at Amsterdam and editor of the Official British Olympic Report for the same games. Subsequently, he worked as an athletics journalist for forty years, becoming a commentator on the sports for BBC radio.

Later in his life, he also became president of the Jewish Athletic Association, and served as chairman for the Amateur Athletic Association (AAA).

In 1936, when the Amateur Athletic Union considered a boycott of Hitler's Olympics, Abrahams successfully led the fight against doing so. While the influential Avery Brundage minimized the scope of the Third Reich's persecution of Jews, Abrahams instead argued on pragmatic grounds: “I do not believe that any real good will come if this resolution is adopted; on the contrary, I believe that it will do harm." He went on to report from the 1936 Berlin Olympics for the BBC, exuberantly covering Jack Lovelock's win in the 1500 metres: “A hundred yards to go! Come on, Jack!! My God, he’s done it. Jack, come on! Lovelock wins. Five yards, six yards, he wins. He’s won. Hooray!” His daughter reported that Abrahams had sat close to Hitler, and had said afterwards: "I wish I'd shot him."

Abrahams wrote a number of books, including Oxford Versus Cambridge. A Record Of Inter-University Contests From 1827-1930 (co-written with John Bruce-Kerr), The Olympic Games, 1896–1952 and The Rome Olympiad, 1960.

Although not an official timer, Abrahams was present when Roger Bannister broke the four-minute mile in 1954.

Abrahams died in Enfield on 14 January 1978, aged 78. He was buried in the same grave as his wife Sybil Evers, in St John the Baptist churchyard in Great Amwell, Hertfordshire.

== Personal life ==
While at Cambridge, Abrahams was romantically involved with academic Christina McLeod Innes, and they became informally engaged, but their relationship waned and ended as Abrahams began focusing exclusively on his athletics and the Olympics. In early 1934, he met D'Oyly Carte Opera Company singer Sybil Evers, and they began a passionate on-and-off romance. According to his biographer Mark Ryan, Abrahams had a fear of commitment and old-fashioned ideas about the role of women in marriage, but he was able to overcome these, and the couple wed in December 1936. In the film Chariots of Fire, Abrahams is instead depicted as dating D'Oyly Carte soprano Sybil Gordon (portrayed by Alice Krige), and the film portrays the couple as meeting a decade earlier than he and Evers actually did.

Abrahams cut a strip of gold off his Olympic medal to make the bridal wedding ring. Both the medal and the ring (following Sybil's death) were later stolen, on separate occasions.

Sybil Evers could not have children, so they adopted an eight-week-old boy, Alan, in 1942, and a nearly three-year-old girl, Susan, in 1946; Susan ("Sue") later married the formerly imprisoned anti-nuclear activist Pat Pottle, with whom she had two sons.

During the Nazi regime and war, the couple also fostered two Jewish refugees: a German boy called "Ken Gardner" (born Kurt Katzenstein), and an Austrian girl named Minka.

Sybil Evers died in 1963 at the age of 59. Abrahams set up two awards in her name: the Sybil Evers Memorial Prize for Singing (1965–1995), an annual cash prize awarded to the best female singer in her last year at the Webber Douglas School of Singing and Dramatic Art, and the Sybil Abrahams Memorial Trophy, presented each year from 1964 onward at Buckingham Palace by the Duke of Edinburgh, President of the British Amateur Athletics Association, to the best British woman athlete.

Abrahams was active in freemasonry. He was a fan of Gilbert and Sullivan, which was portrayed in Chariots of Fire.

== Honours ==
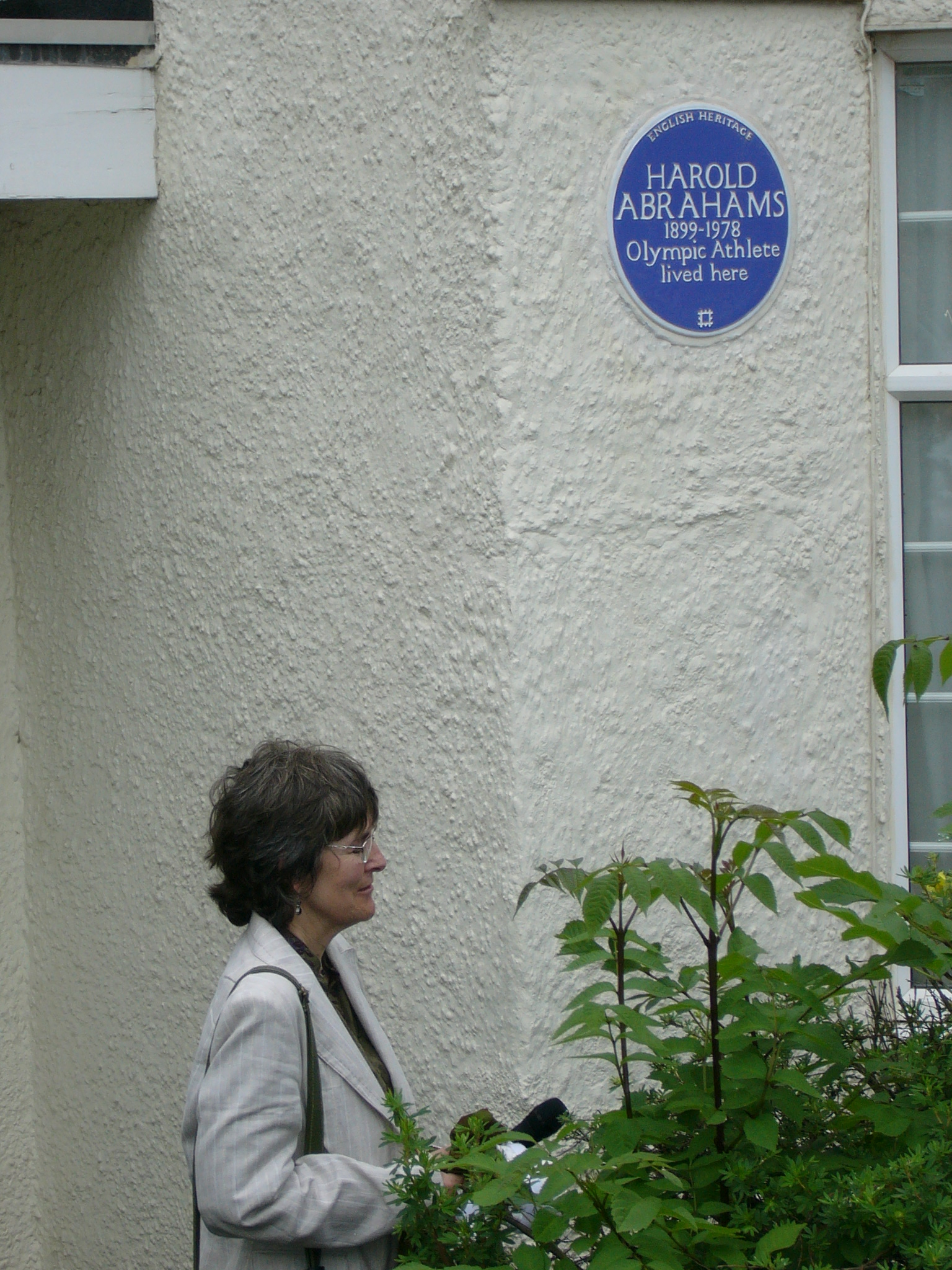
Abrahams' daughter Sue Pottle unveiling the English Heritage Blue plaque commemorating Abrahams in Golders Green

Abrahams was appointed a Commander of the Order of the British Empire (CBE) in 1957. Abrahams has been recognised with an English Heritage Blue plaque at his former home in Golders Green in northwest London, which was unveiled by his daughter Sue Pottle and nephew Tony Abrahams. Abrahams lived at Hodford Lodge, 2 Hodford Road, from 1923 to 1930, years during which he achieved his greatest successes.

A plaque from the Heritage Foundation was unveiled at his birthplace, Rutland Road in Bedford, on 8 July 2012. This coincided with the Olympic torch relay passing through the town.

Abrahams was immortalised in the 1981 film Chariots of Fire, in which he was played by British actor Ben Cross. The film won four Academy Awards, including Best Picture. His memorial service serves as the framing device for the movie, which tells his story and that of Liddell.

Abrahams was inducted into the International Jewish Sports Hall of Fame in 1981 and into the England Athletics Hall of Fame in 2009.

In July 2012, plans were announced to erect a memorial to Abrahams in Telford, Shropshire, to recognise that before the 1924 Olympics he won a gold medal in the 100-yard sprint at the Midlands Area AAA championships at St George's Recreation Club ground. The memorial, in the form of a plaque, was unveiled by Sue Pottle in October 2014 in the lounge of the club, which now possesses the medal he won at the event.

Norris McWhirter once commented that Abrahams "managed by sheer force of personality and with very few allies to raise athletics from a minor to a major national sport". Reflecting in 1948 on Abrahams' athleticism, Philip Noel-Baker, Britain's 1912 Olympic captain and a Nobel Prize winner, wrote:

I have always believed that Harold Abrahams was the only European sprinter who could have run with Jesse Owens, Ralph Metcalfe, and the other great sprinters from the U.S. He was in their class, not only because of natural gifts – his magnificent physique, his splendid racing temperament, his flair for the big occasion – but because he understood athletics and had given more brainpower and more will power to the subject than any other runner of his day.

== Archives ==
Archives of Harold Abrahams are held at the Cadbury Research Library, University of Birmingham.

== See also ==
- David Jacobs, the first British Jew to win an Olympic gold medal.
- List of British Jewish sportspeople
- List of select Jewish track and field athletes
