= Steve Peers =

British academic

- Education: McMaster University; University of Western Ontario; London School of Economics; University of Essex
- Occupation: Academic

Steve Peers is a British academic and an expert on the European Union. He is a professor in the Department of Law and Criminology at Royal Holloway, University of London. He is the author of EU Justice and Home Affairs Law and The Brexit: The Legal Framework for Withdrawal from the EU or Renegotiation of EU Membership.

== Early life ==
Steve Peers graduated from McMaster University, where he received a Bachelor of Arts degree in history in 1988. He earned an LL.B. from the Western Law School at the University of Western Ontario, an LL.M. in EU Law from the London School of Economics in 1993, and a Ph.D. from the University of Essex in 2001.

== Career ==
Peers is a professor in the Department of Law and Criminology at Royal Holloway University of London. He also taught at the European Inter-University Centre for Human Rights and Democratisation in Venice, Italy in April 2016.

Peers is the author of EU Justice and Home Affairs Law, which was reviewed by Dr Colin Harvey of Queen's University Belfast in the Oxford Journal of Legal Studies in 2003 and Professor Friedemann Kainer of the University of Mannheim in Integration in 2007. He also authored The Brexit: The Legal Framework for Withdrawal from the EU or Renegotiation of EU Membership. He is the co-author of The EU Citizenship Directive: A Commentary, and the co-editor of several books about European Union law.

Peers has written commentaries for the Brussels-based Centre for European Policy Studies; New Europeans, a pro-European Union organization; and The UK in a Changing Europe, a think tank funded by the Economic and Social Research Council (ESRC) and based at King's College London.

Peers has advised the British government on EU policy. In October 2016, he argued that banning foreign-born academics like Sara Hagemann from serving as advisors to the Foreign and Commonwealth Office on Brexit would "come across as hostile, narrow and xenophobic." He tweeted, "What kind of know-nothing nativist govt rejects the expertise of all non-citizens?".

== Works ==
- Peers, Steve (2000). EU Justice and Home Affairs Law. New York: Longman. ISBN 9780582320161. OCLC 42744936.
- Peers, Steve; Ward, Angela, eds. (2004). The EU Charter of Fundamental Rights: Politics, Law and Policy. Portland, Oregon: Hart Publishing. ISBN 9781841134499. OCLC 55963935.
- Peers, Steve; Rogers, Nicola, eds. (2006). EU Immigration and Asylum Law: Text and Commentary. Leiden: Martinus Nijhoff Publishers. ISBN 9789004153745. OCLC 71299060.
- Guild, Elspeth; Peers, Steve; Tomkin, Jonathan (2014). The EU Citizenship Directive: A Commentary. Oxford, U.K.: Oxford University Press. ISBN 9780198705239. OCLC 873990216.
- Barnard, Catherine; Peers, Steve, eds. (2014). European Union Law. Oxford, U.K.: Oxford University Press. ISBN 9780199686117. OCLC 879398376.
- Hervey, Tamara K.; Kenner, Jeff; Peers, Steve; Ward, Angela, eds. (2014). The EU Charter of Fundamental Rights: A Commentary. Portland, Oregon: Hart Publishing. ISBN 9781849463089. OCLC 832313599.
- Peers, Steve (2016). The Brexit: The Legal Framework for Withdrawal from the EU or Renegotiation of EU Membership. Oxford, U.K.: Hart Publishing. ISBN 9781849468749. OCLC 917161408.
