= Catherine Barnard =

British legal scholar

Catherine Sarah Barnard FBA FLSW is a British academic, who specialises in European Union, employment, and competition law. She has been Professor of European Union and Employment Law at the University of Cambridge since 2008. She has been a Fellow of Trinity College, Cambridge since 1996, and is the college's Senior Tutor.

== Education ==
Barnard read law at Fitzwilliam College, Cambridge (MA Cantab), and the European University Institute (LLM). She earned a Doctor of Philosophy (PhD) degree from the University of Cambridge.

== Career ==
Barnard was elected a Fellow of Trinity College, Cambridge in 1996. She was appointed Reader in European Union Law in the Faculty of Law, University of Cambridge on 1 October 2004. On 1 October 2008, she was awarded a chair as Professor of European Union and Employment Law.

In 2020, Barnard was elected as a Fellow of the Learned Society of Wales.

== Selected works ==
- Barnard, Catherine; Scott, Joanne, eds. (2002). The law of the single European market: unpacking the premises. Oxford: Hart. ISBN 978-1841132716.
- Barnard, Catherine (2006). EC employment law (3rd ed.). Oxford University Press. p. Oxford. ISBN 978-0199280032.
- Barnard, Catherine (2010). The substantive law of the EU: the four freedoms (3rd ed.). Oxford: Oxford University Press. ISBN 978-0199562244.
- Barnard, Catherine (2012). EU employment law (4th ed.). Oxford: Oxford University Press. ISBN 978-0199692927.
- Barnard, Catherine (2016). The substantive law of the EU: the four freedoms (5th ed.). Oxford: Oxford University Press. ISBN 978-0198749950.
- Barnard, Catherine; Peers, Steve, eds. (2017). European Union law (2nd ed.). Oxford: Oxford University Press. ISBN 978-0198789130.
