= Trinity College, Cambridge =

Constituent college of the University of Cambridge in England

Coordinates: 52°12′25″N 0°06′53″E

Trinity College
- University of Cambridge
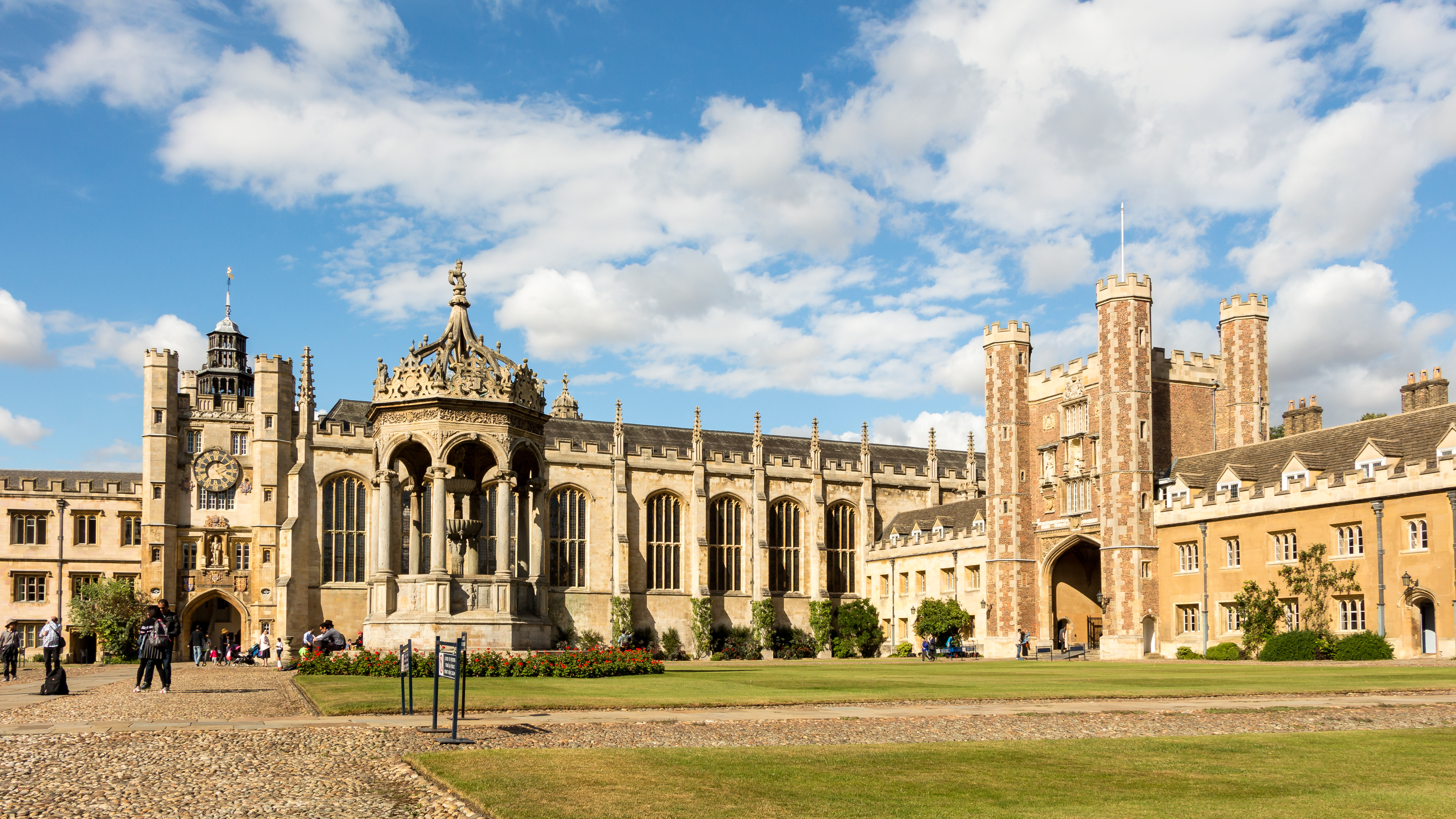
- Trinity College Great Court

- Coat of arms of Trinity College; Arms: Argent, a chevron between three roses gules barbed and seeded proper and on a chief gules a lion passant gardant between two closed books all Or
Scarf colours: navy, with three equally-spaced narrow stripes, the outer stripes of yellow and slightly narrower, the central stripe of red and slightly wider
- Location: Trinity Street
- Full name: The College of the Holy and Undivided Trinity within the Town and University of Cambridge of King Henry the Eighth's Foundation
- Latin name: Collegium Trinitatis
- Motto: Virtus Vera Nobilitas (Latin)
- Motto in English: Virtue is true nobility
- Founder: Henry VIII of England
- Established: 1546; 480 years ago
- Named after: The Holy Trinity
- Former names: King's Hall and Michaelhouse (until merged in 1546)
- Sister college: Christ Church, Oxford
- Master: Sir David Baulcombe
- Undergraduates: 735 (2022–23)
- Postgraduates: 336 (2022–23)
- Endowment: £2.02bn (2023)
- Visitor: Charles III, The Crown ex officio
- Website: trin.cam.ac.uk
- Students' union: www.tcsu.net
- BA society: basociety.net
- Boat club: First and Third Trinity Boat Club

Map
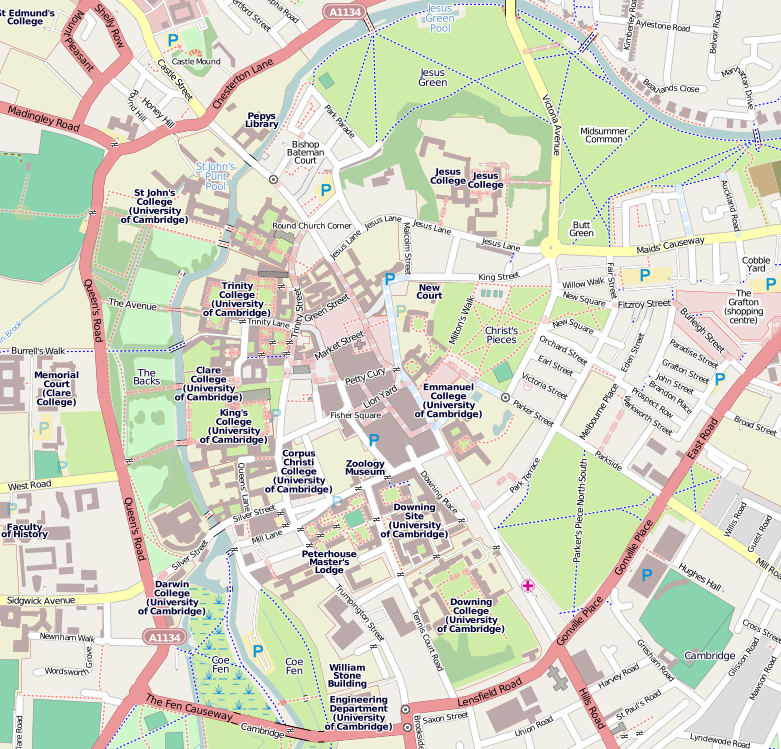
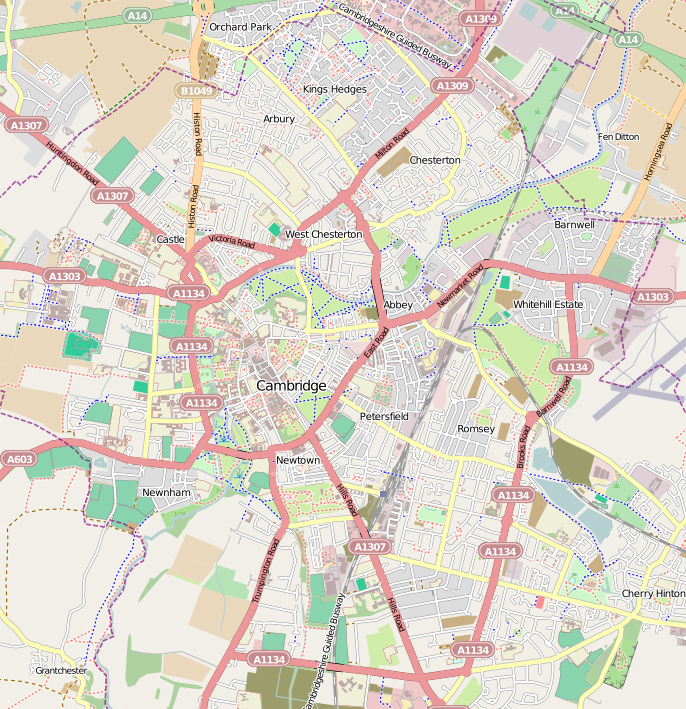
- Location within Central Cambridge Location within Cambridge

Trinity College is a constituent college of the University of Cambridge. Founded in 1546 by King Henry VIII, Trinity is one of the largest Cambridge colleges, with the largest financial endowment of any college at Oxford or Cambridge. Trinity has some of the most distinctive architecture in Cambridge with its Great Court said to be the largest enclosed courtyard in Europe. Academically, Trinity performs exceptionally as measured by the Tompkins Table (the annual unofficial league table of Cambridge colleges), coming top from 2011 to 2017, and regaining the position in 2024.

Members of Trinity have been awarded 34 Nobel Prizes out of the 126 received by members of the University of Cambridge (more than any other Oxford or Cambridge college). Members of the college have received four Fields Medals, one Turing Award and one Abel Prize. Trinity alumni include Francis Bacon, six British prime ministers (the highest number of any Cambridge college), founding prime minister of India Jawaharlal Nehru, physicists Isaac Newton, James Clerk Maxwell, Ernest Rutherford and Niels Bohr, mathematicians Srinivasa Ramanujan and Charles Babbage, poets Lord Byron and Lord Tennyson, English jurist Edward Coke, writers Vladimir Nabokov and A. A. Milne, historians Lord Macaulay and G. M. Trevelyan, and philosophers Ludwig Wittgenstein and Bertrand Russell (whom the college expelled before reaccepting).

Two members of the British royal family have studied at Trinity and been awarded degrees: Prince William of Gloucester and Edinburgh, who gained an MA degree in 1790, and King Charles III, who was awarded a lower second-class BA degree in 1970.

Trinity's many college societies include the Trinity Mathematical Society, the oldest mathematical university society in the United Kingdom, and the First and Third Trinity Boat Club, its rowing club, which gives its name to the May Ball. Along with Christ's, Jesus, King's and St John's colleges, it has provided several well-known members of the Cambridge Apostles, an intellectual secret society. In 1848, Trinity hosted a meeting at which Cambridge undergraduates representing fee-paying private schools codified a set of early rules of football known as the Cambridge rules. Trinity's sister college is Christ Church, Oxford. Trinity has been linked with Westminster School since the school's re-foundation in 1560, and its Master is an ex officio governor of the school.

== History ==
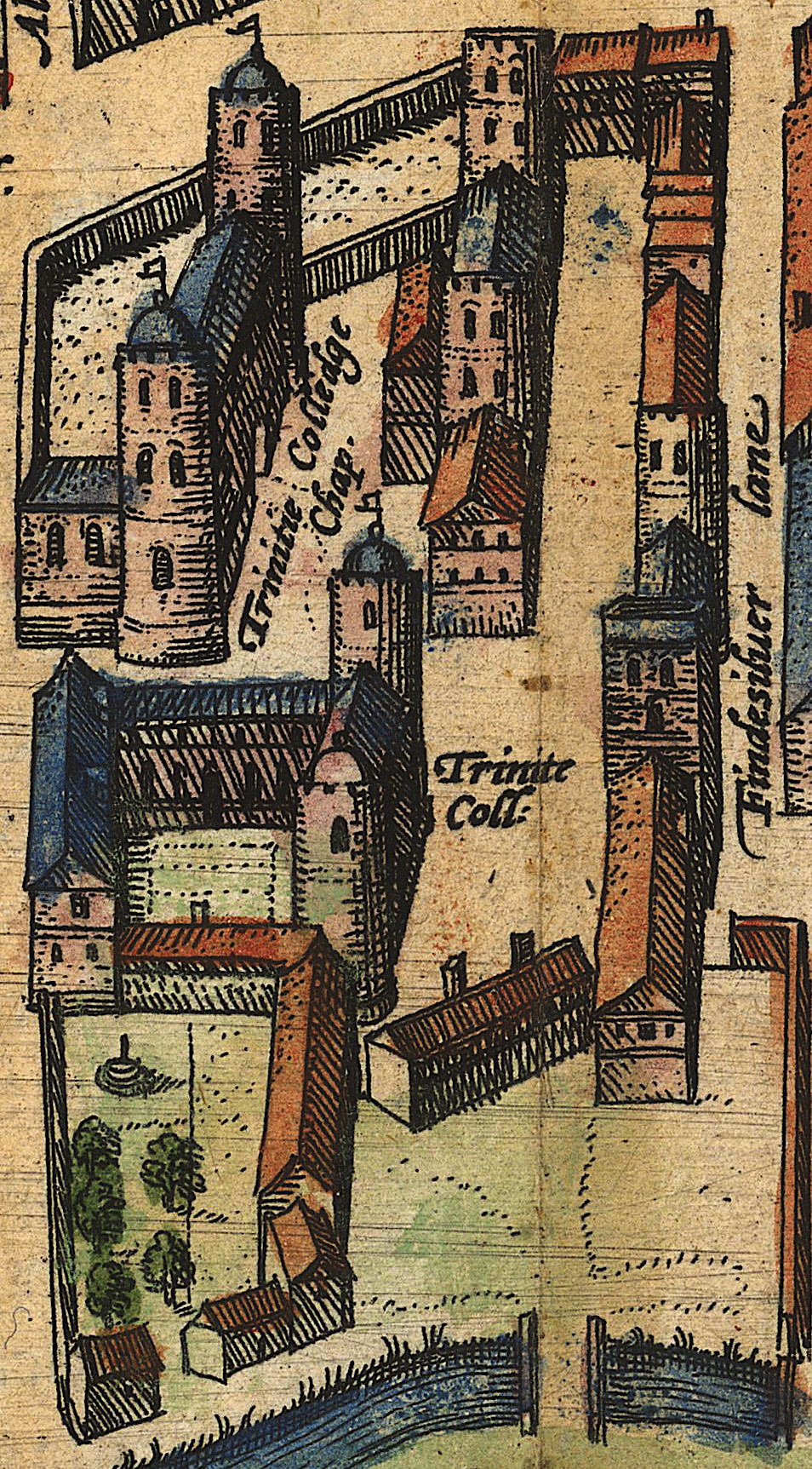
1575 map showing the King's Hall (top left) and Michaelhouse (top right) buildings before Thomas Nevile's reconstruction.

=== Foundation ===
The college was founded by Henry VIII in 1546 with the name College of the Holy and Undivided Trinity within the Town and University of Cambridge of King Henry the Eighth's Foundation, from the merger of two existing colleges: Michaelhouse (founded by Hervey de Stanton in 1324), and King's Hall (established by Edward II in 1317 and refounded by Edward III in 1337). At the time, Henry had been seizing (Catholic) church lands from abbeys and monasteries. The universities of Oxford and Cambridge, being both religious institutions and quite rich, expected to be next in line. The king duly passed an act of Parliament, the Dissolution of Colleges Act 1545 (37 Hen. 8. c. 4), that allowed him to suppress (and confiscate the property of) any college he wished. The universities used their contacts to plead with his sixth wife, Catherine Parr. The Queen persuaded her husband not to close them down, but to create a new college. The king did not want to use royal funds, so he instead combined two colleges (King's Hall and Michaelhouse) and seven hostels to form Trinity.

=== Nevile's expansion ===
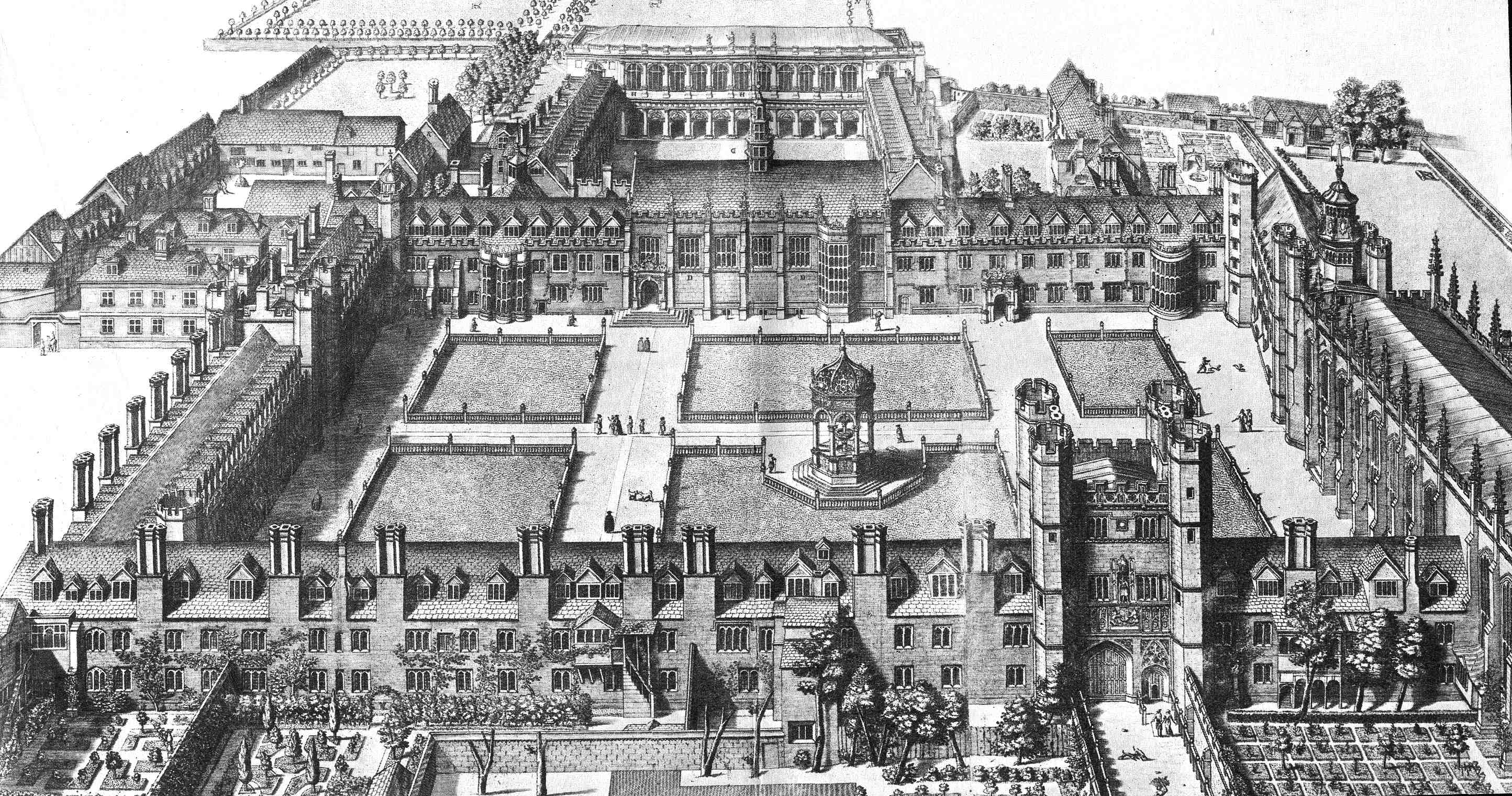
David Loggan's print of 1690 showing Nevile's Great Court (foreground) and Nevile's Court with the then-new Wren Library (background) – New Court had yet to be built.

The monastic lands granted by Henry VIII were not on their own sufficient to ensure Trinity's eventual rise. In terms of architecture and royal association, it was not until the Mastership of Thomas Nevile (1593–1615) that Trinity assumed both its spaciousness and its association with the governing class that distinguished it since the Civil War. In its infancy Trinity had owed a great deal to its neighbouring college of St John's: in the words of Roger Ascham, Trinity was a colonia deducta.

Most of Trinity's major buildings date from the 16th and 17th centuries. Thomas Nevile, who became Master of Trinity in 1593, rebuilt and redesigned much of the college. This work included the enlargement and completion of Great Court and the construction of Nevile's Court between Great Court and the river Cam. Nevile's Court was completed in the late 17th century with the Wren Library, designed by Christopher Wren. Nevile's building campaign drove the college into debt from which it surfaced only in the 1640s, and the Mastership of Richard Bentley adversely affected applications and finances. Bentley himself was notorious for the construction of a hugely expensive staircase in the Master's Lodge and for his repeated refusals to step down despite pleas from the Fellows. Besides, despite not being a sister college of Trinity College Dublin, as is the case with St John's College, Cambridge, it is believed that the Irish institution takes its name from this college, which was the alma mater of its first provost, Adam Loftus and, likewise, from Trinity College, Oxford.

=== Modern day ===
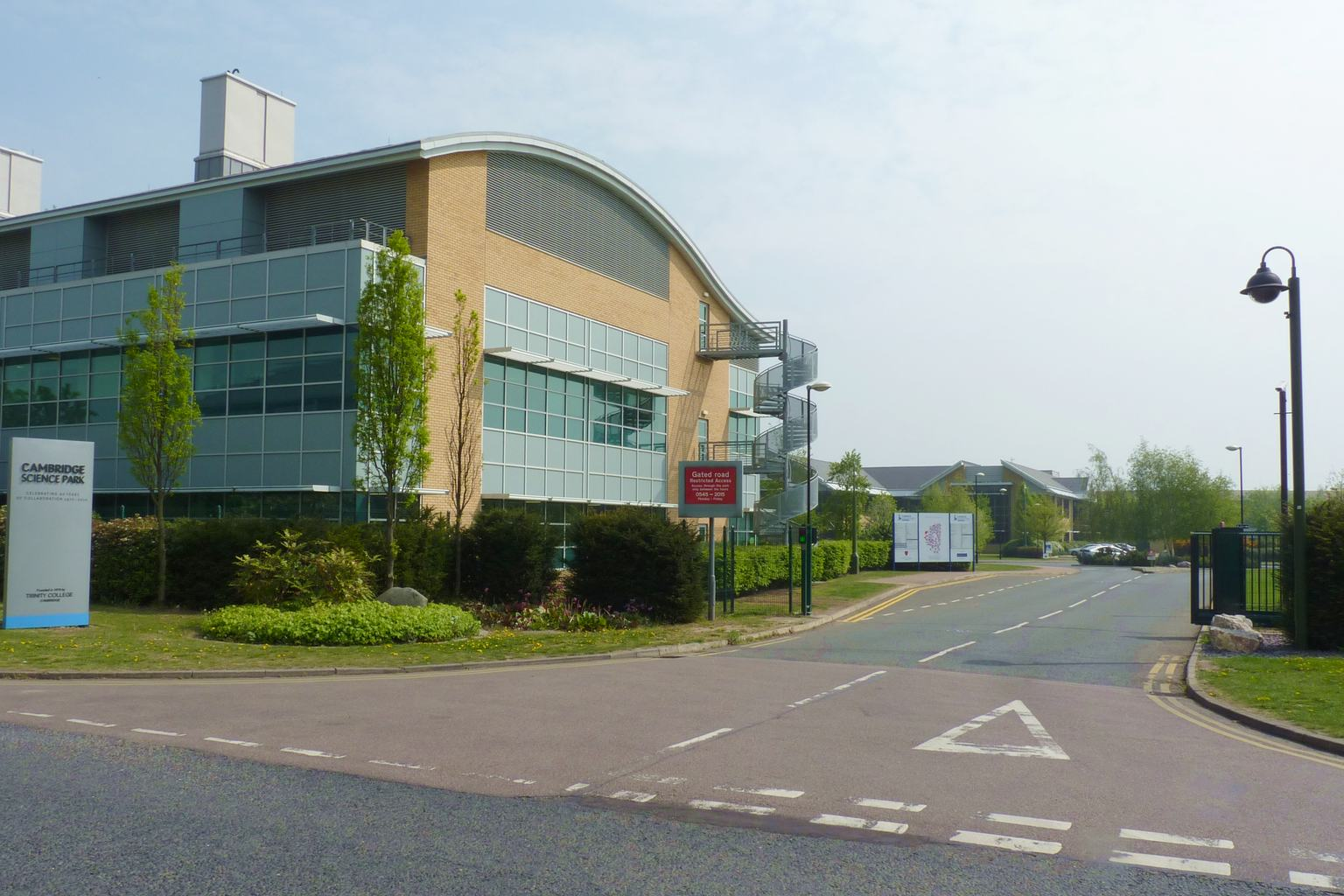
Trinity established Cambridge Science Park, the UK's first science park, in 1970.

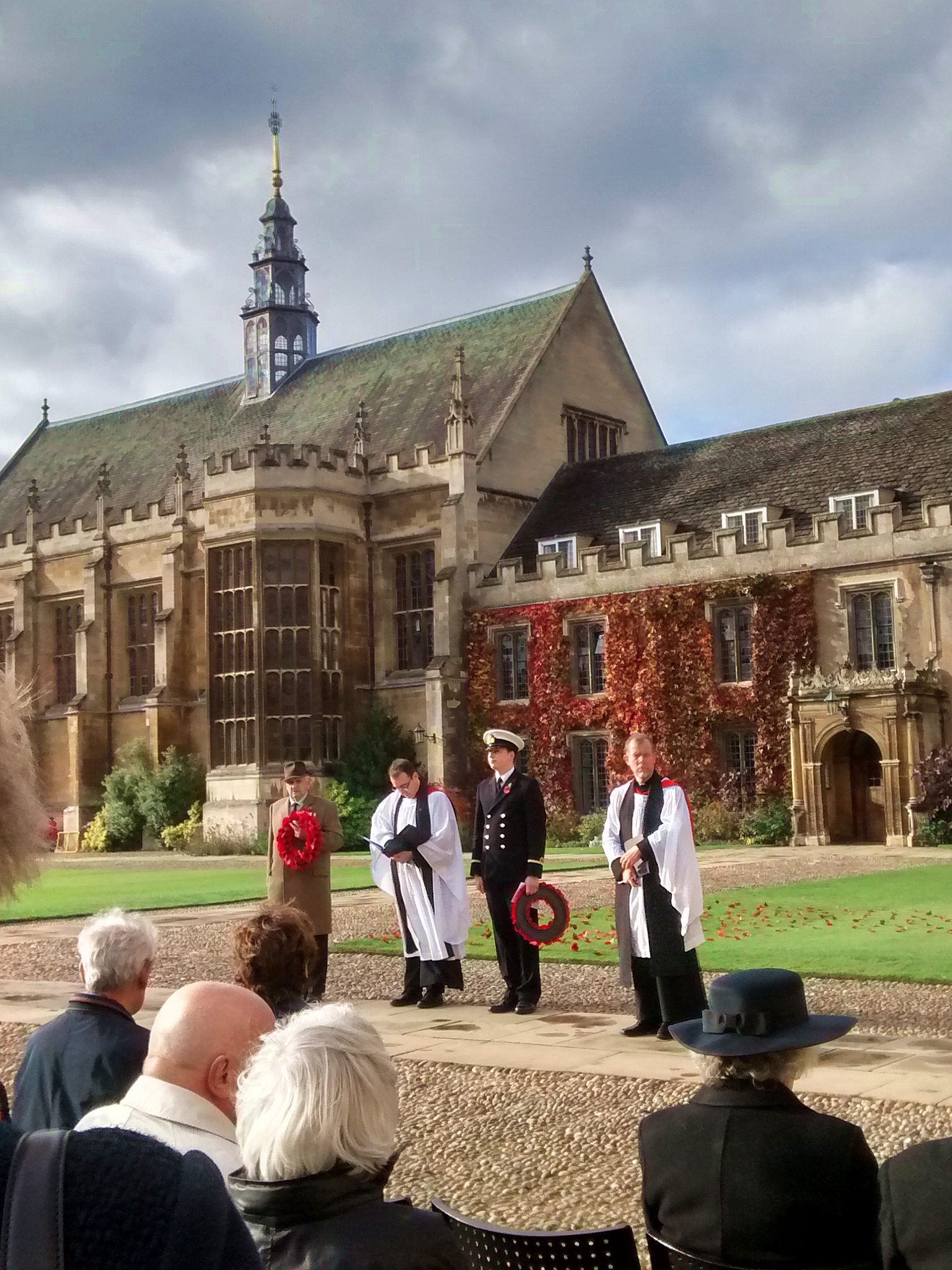
Remembrance Service at the Great Court in 2018

In the 20th century, Trinity College, St John's College and King's College were for decades the main recruiting grounds for the Cambridge Apostles, an elite, intellectual secret society. In 2011, the John Templeton Foundation awarded Trinity College's Master, the astrophysicist Martin Rees, its controversial million-pound Templeton Prize, for "affirming life's spiritual dimension". Trinity is the richest Oxbridge college with a landholding alone worth £800 million. For comparison, the second richest college in Cambridge (St John's) has estimated assets of around £780 million, and the richest college in Oxford (Magdalen) has about £940 million. In 2005, Trinity's annual rental income from its properties was reported to be in excess of £20 million. The college owns:

- 3400 acres (14 km^{2}) housing facilities at the Port of Felixstowe, Britain's busiest container port.
- the Cambridge Science Park.
- the O2 Arena in London (formerly the Millennium Dome).

In 2018, Trinity revealed that it had investments totalling £9.1 million in companies involved in oil and gas production, exploration and refinement. These included holdings of £1.2 million in Royal Dutch Shell, £1.7 million in Exxon Mobil and £1 million in Chevron. In 2019, Trinity confirmed its plan to withdraw from the Universities Superannuation Scheme (USS), the main pre-1992 UK University pension provider. In response, more than 500 Cambridge academics signed an open letter undertaking to "refuse to supervise Trinity students or to engage in other discretionary work in support of Trinity's teaching and research activities". On 17 February 2020, protestors from the campaign group Extinction Rebellion dug up the front lawn of Trinity College to protest against the College's investments in fossil fuels and its negotiations to sell off a farm in Suffolk that was to be turned into a lorry park.

=== Legends ===
Lord Byron purportedly kept a pet bear while living in the college. Trinity is also often cited as the inventor of an English version of crème brûlée, known as "Trinity burnt cream".

=== Trinity in Camberwell ===
Trinity College has a long-standing relationship with the Parish of St George's, Camberwell, in South London. Students from the College have helped to run holiday schemes for children from the parish since 1966. The relationship was formalised in 1979 with the establishment of Trinity in Camberwell as a registered charity.

== Buildings and grounds ==
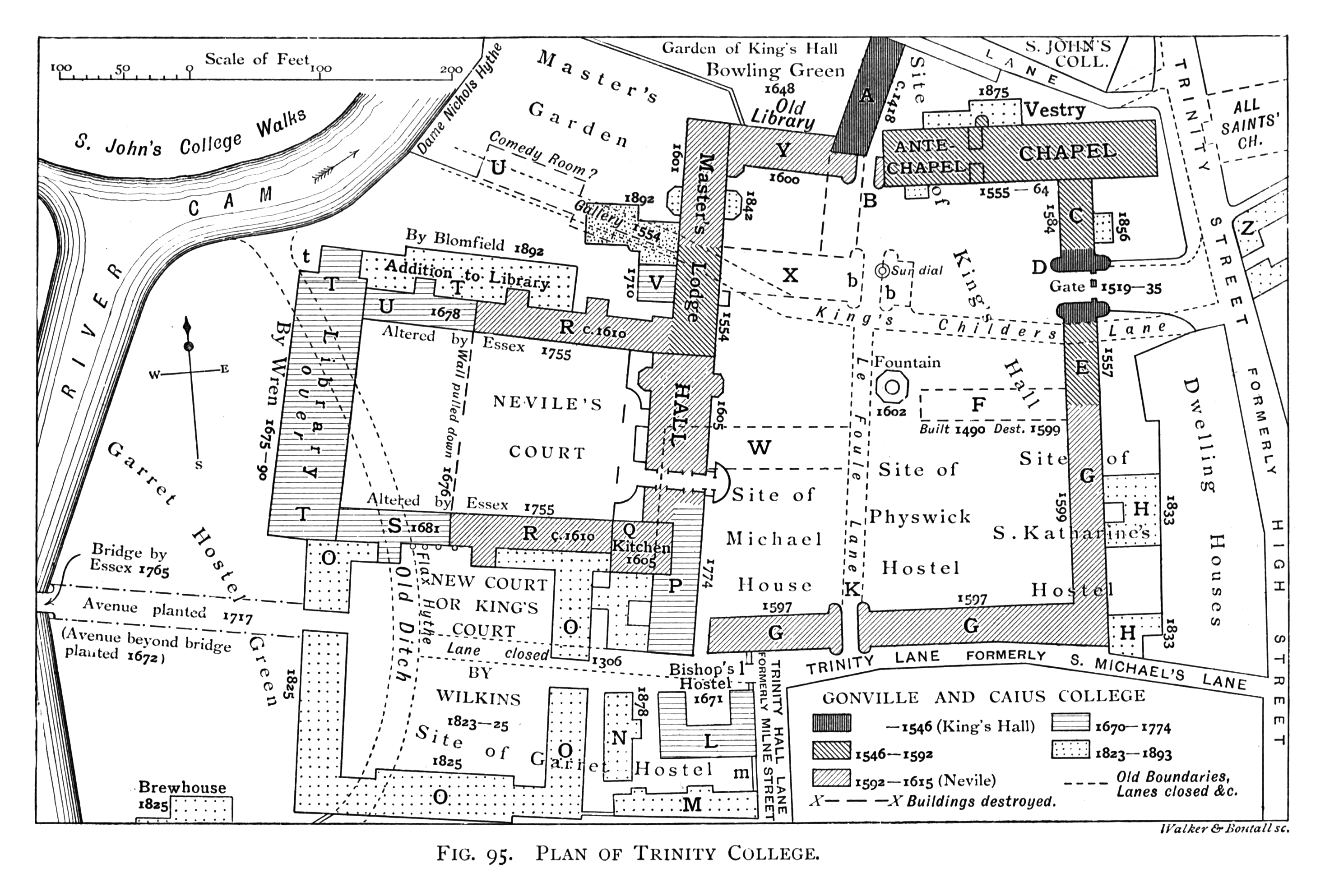
A historical plan of the development of Trinity College by 1897

=== Great Gate ===
The Great Gate is the main entrance to the college, leading to the Great Court. A statue of the college founder, Henry VIII, stands in a niche above the doorway. In 1983, Trinity College undergraduate Lance Anisfeld, then Vice-President of CURLS (Cambridge Union Raving Loony Society), replaced the chair leg with a bicycle pump. Once discovered the following day, the college removed the pump and replaced it with another chair leg. The original chair leg was auctioned off by TV presenter Chris Serle at a Cambridge Union Society charity raffle in 1985. In 2023, the college replaced the chair leg with a sceptre to mark the 75th birthday of Charles III, an alumnus of the college. In 1704, the university's first astronomical observatory was built on top of the gatehouse. Beneath the founder's statue are the coats of arms of Edward III, the founder of King's Hall, and those of his five sons who survived to maturity, as well as William of Hatfield, whose shield is blank as he died as an infant, before being granted arms.

=== Great Court ===
Great Court (built 1599–1608) was the brainchild of Thomas Nevile, who demolished several existing buildings on this site, including almost the entirety of the former college of Michaelhouse. The sole remaining building of Michaelhouse was replaced by the then current Kitchens (designed by James Essex) in 1770–1775. The Master's Lodge is the official residence of the Sovereign when in Cambridge. King's Hostel (built 1377–1416) is located to the north of Great Court, behind the clock tower. This is, along with the King's Gate, the sole remaining building from King's Hall. Bishop's Hostel (built 1671) is a detached building to the southwest of Great Court, and named after John Hacket, Bishop of Lichfield and Coventry. Additional buildings were built in 1878 by Arthur Blomfield.

=== Nevile's Court ===
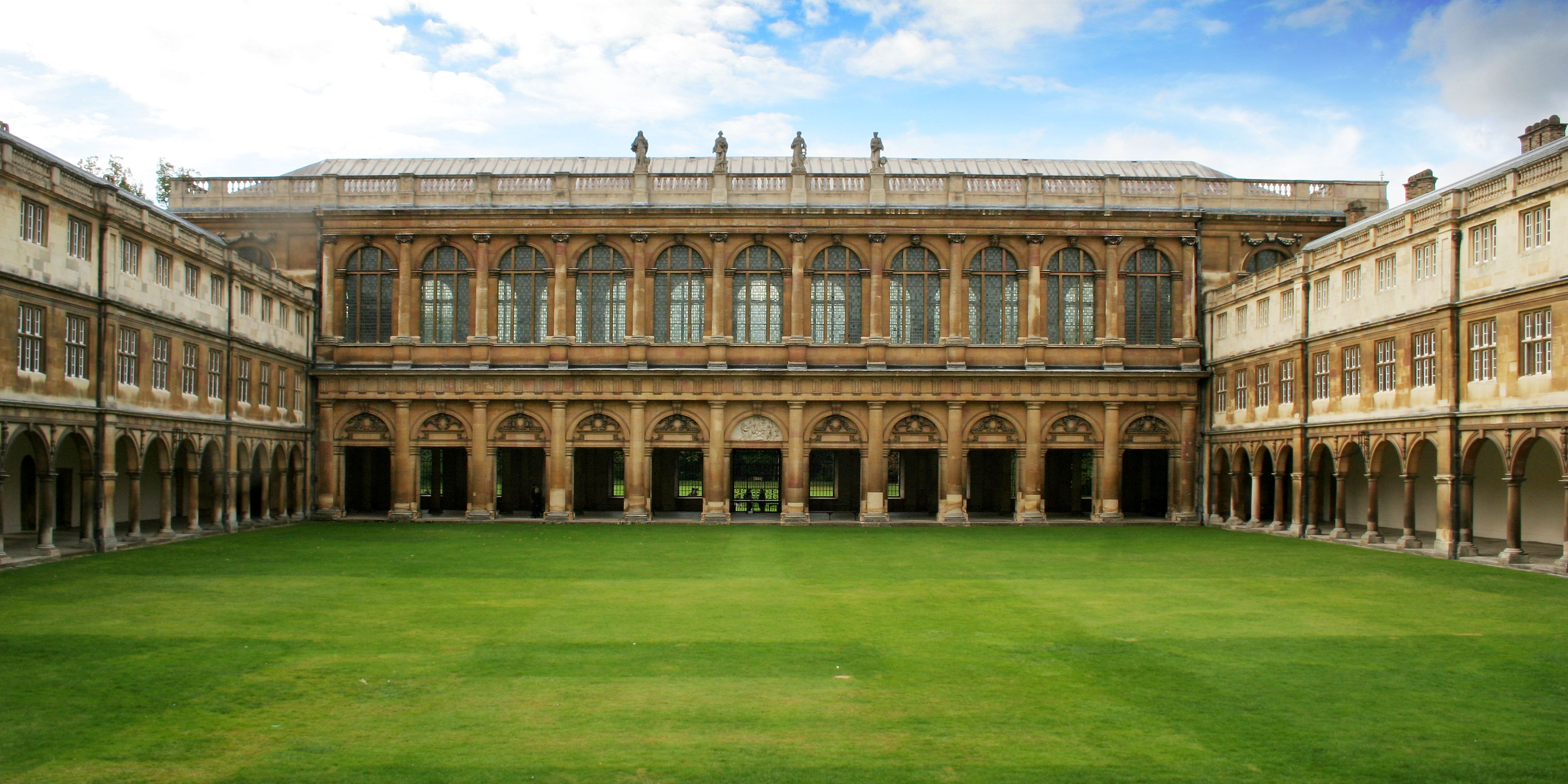
The Wren Library at Nevile's Court

Nevile's Court (built 1614) is located between Great Court and the river. It was created by a bequest by the college's master, Thomas Nevile, originally two-thirds of its current length and without the Wren Library. The court was extended and the appearance of the upper floor remodelled slightly in 1758 by James Essex. Cloisters run around the court, providing sheltered walkways from the rear of Great Hall to the college library and reading room as well as the Wren Library and New Court.

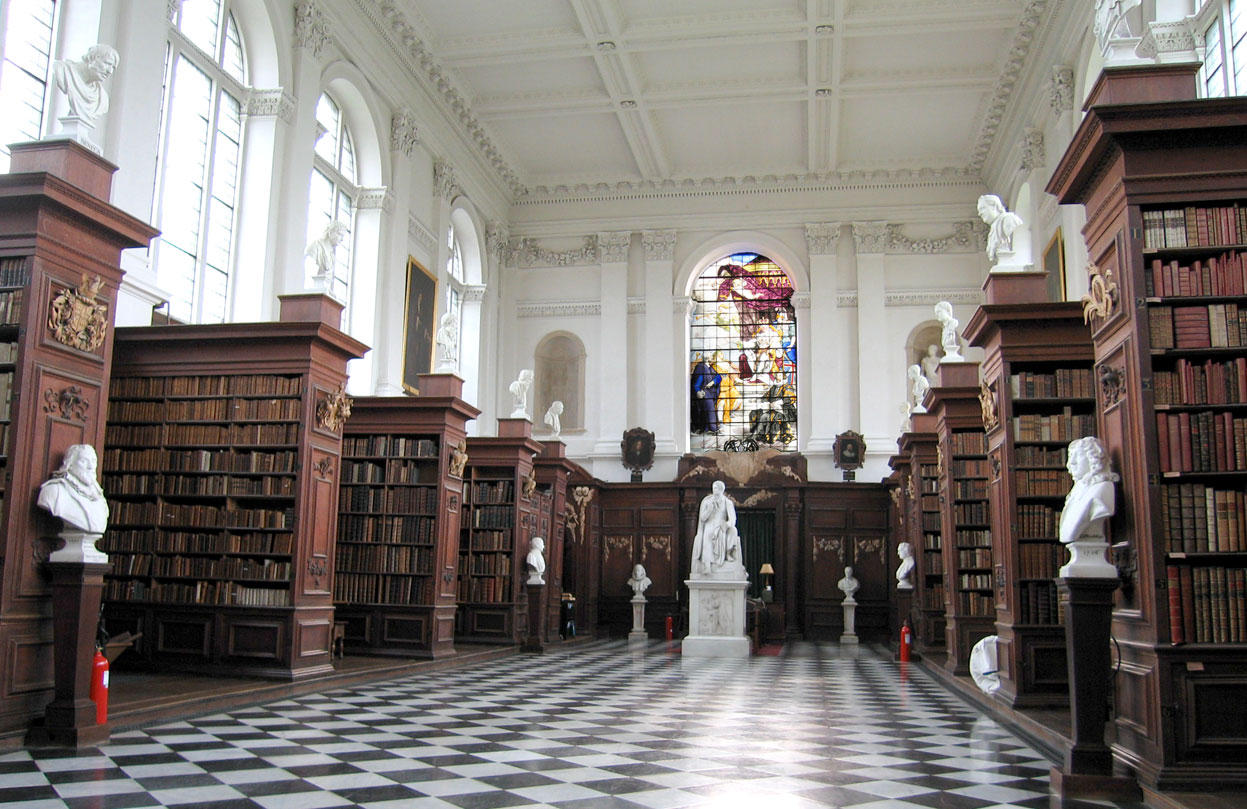
Wren Library interior, showing the limewood carvings by Grinling Gibbons

The Wren Library (built 1676–1695, Christopher Wren) is located at the west end of Nevile's Court, the Wren is one of Cambridge's most famous and well-endowed libraries. Among its notable possessions are two of Shakespeare's First Folios, a 14th-century manuscript of The Vision of Piers Plowman, letters written by Sir Isaac Newton, and the Eadwine Psalter. Below the building are the Wren Library Cloisters, from which the Great Hall and the river and Backs are viewable.

Since the completion of the Wren Library in 1695, a number of prominent portraits have been displayed within its walls, including those of Arthur James Balfour, John Hacket, Isaac Barrow, William Lamb, and Thomas Nevile. As of November 2024, the portrait of Balfour was temporarily relocated to an undisclosed location in Cambridge after being vandalised by an activist associated with the group Palestine Action. Trinity College stated that revealing the painting's current location or restoration studio would present a security risk.

=== New Court ===
New Court (or King's Court; built 1825, William Wilkins) is located to the south of Nevile's Court, and built in Tudor-Gothic style; this court is notable for the large tree in the centre. A myth is sometimes circulated that this was the tree from which the apple dropped onto Isaac Newton; in fact, Newton was at home in Woolsthorpe when he deduced his theory of gravity – and the tree is a horse chestnut tree. For many years it was the custom for students to place a bicycle high in the branches of the tree of New Court. Usually invisible except in winter, when the leaves had fallen, such bicycles tended to remain for several years before being removed by the authorities. The students then inserted another bicycle.

=== Other courts ===
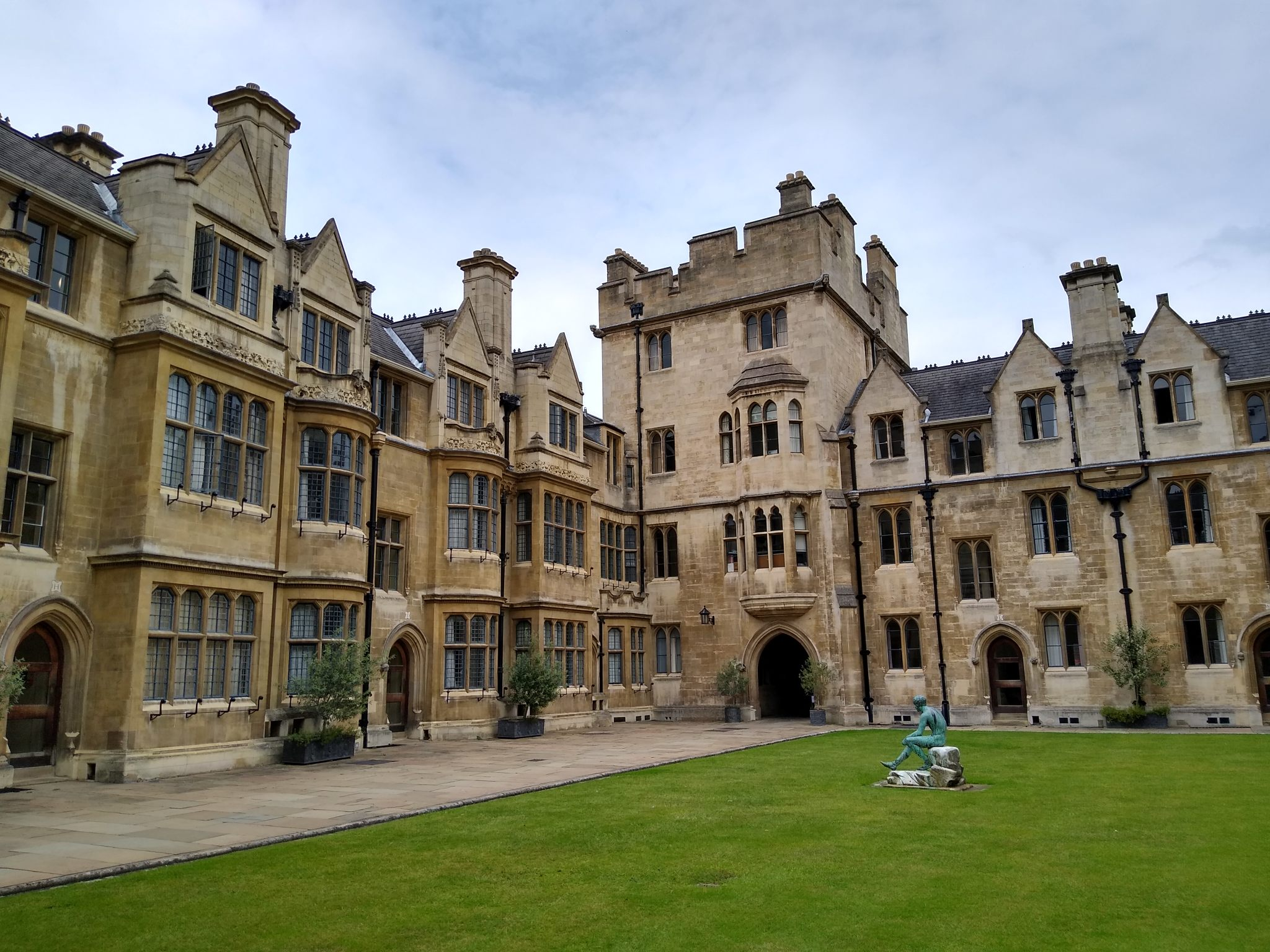
Whewell's Court north range

Whewell's Court (1860–1868, Anthony Salvin) is located across the street from Great Court, and was entirely paid for by William Whewell, the Master of the college from 1841 until his death in 1866. The north range was later remodelled by W.D. Caroe. Angel Court (built 1957–1959, H. C. Husband) is located between Great Court and Trinity Street, and is used along with the Wolfson Building for accommodating first year students.

The Wolfson Building (built 1968–1972, Architects' Co-Partnership) is located to the south of Whewell's Court, on top of a podium above shops, this building resembles a brick-clad ziggurat, and is used exclusively for first-year accommodation. Having been renovated during the academic year 2005–06, many rooms are now en-suite. Blue Boar Court (built 1989, MJP Architects) is located to the south of the Wolfson Building, on top of podium a floor up from ground level, and including the upper floors of several surrounding Georgian buildings on Trinity Street, Green Street and Sidney Street. Burrell's Field (built 1995, MJP Architects) is located on a site to the west of the main College buildings, opposite the Cambridge University Library.

=== Chapel ===
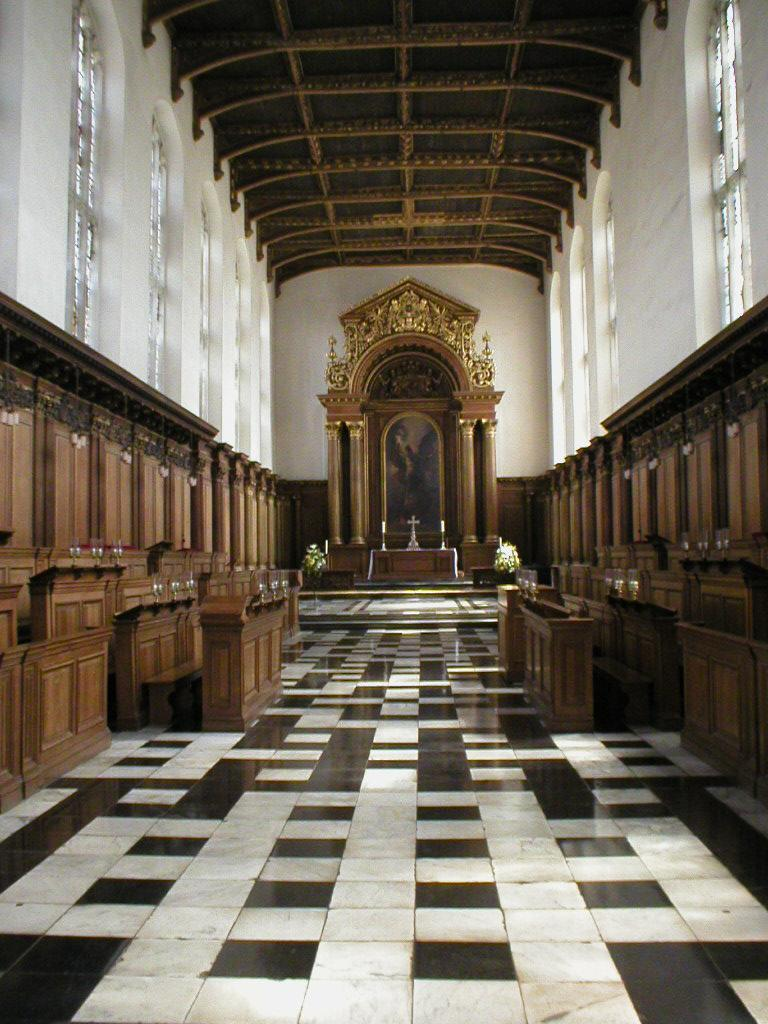
Inside Trinity College Chapel

Trinity College Chapel dates from the mid 16th century and is Grade I listed. There are a number of memorials to former Fellows of Trinity within the Chapel, including statues, brasses, and two memorials to graduates and Fellows who died during the World Wars. Among the most notable of these is a statue of Isaac Newton by Roubiliac, described by Sir Francis Chantrey as "the noblest, I think, of all our English statues." The Chapel is a performance space for the College Choir which comprises around thirty Choral Scholars and two Organ Scholars, all of whom are ordinarily students at the university.

=== Grounds ===
The Fellows' Garden is located on the west side of Queen's Road, opposite the drive that leads to the Backs. The Fellows' Bowling Green is located north of Great Court, between King's Hostel and the river. It is the site for many of the tutors' garden parties in the summer months, while the Master's Garden is located behind the Master's Lodge. The Old Fields are located on the western side of Grange Road, next to Burrell's Field. It currently houses the college's gym, changing rooms, squash courts, badminton courts, rugby, hockey and football pitches along with tennis and netball courts.

=== Trinity Bridge ===
Trinity Bridge is a stone built triple-arched road bridge across the River Cam. It was built of Portland stone in 1765 to the designs of James Essex to replace an earlier bridge built in 1651 and is a Grade I listed building.

=== Gallery ===
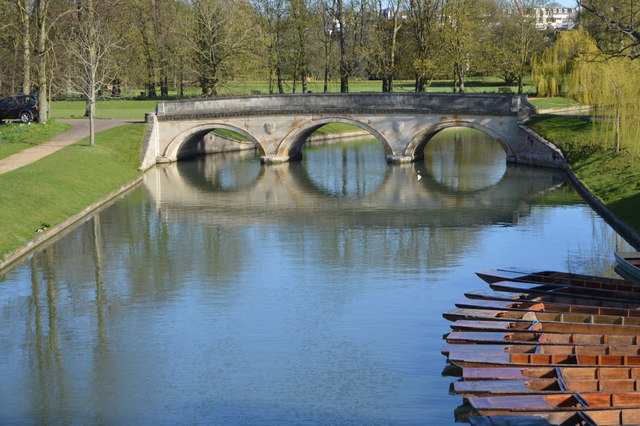
Trinity Bridge

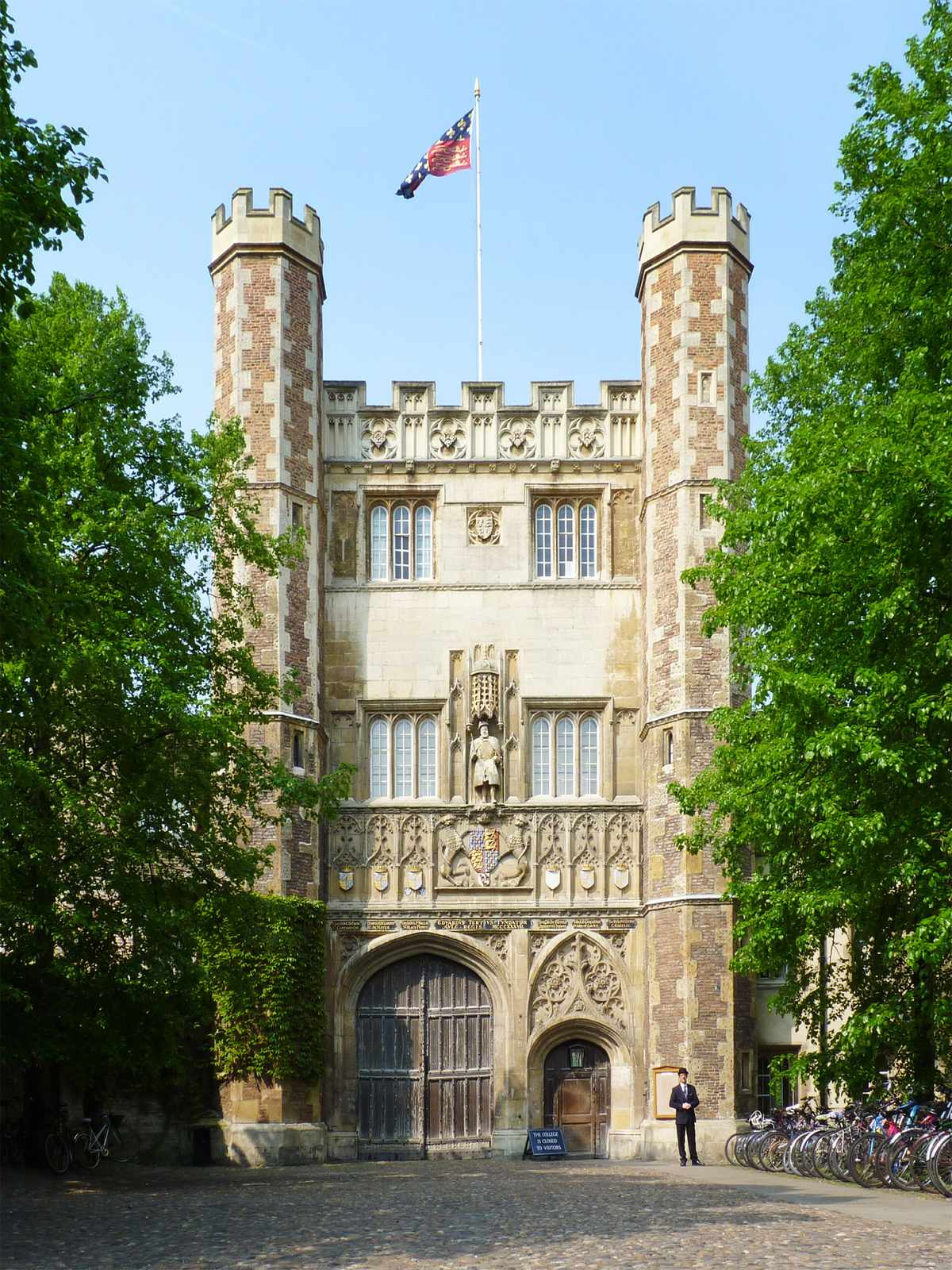
Great Gate

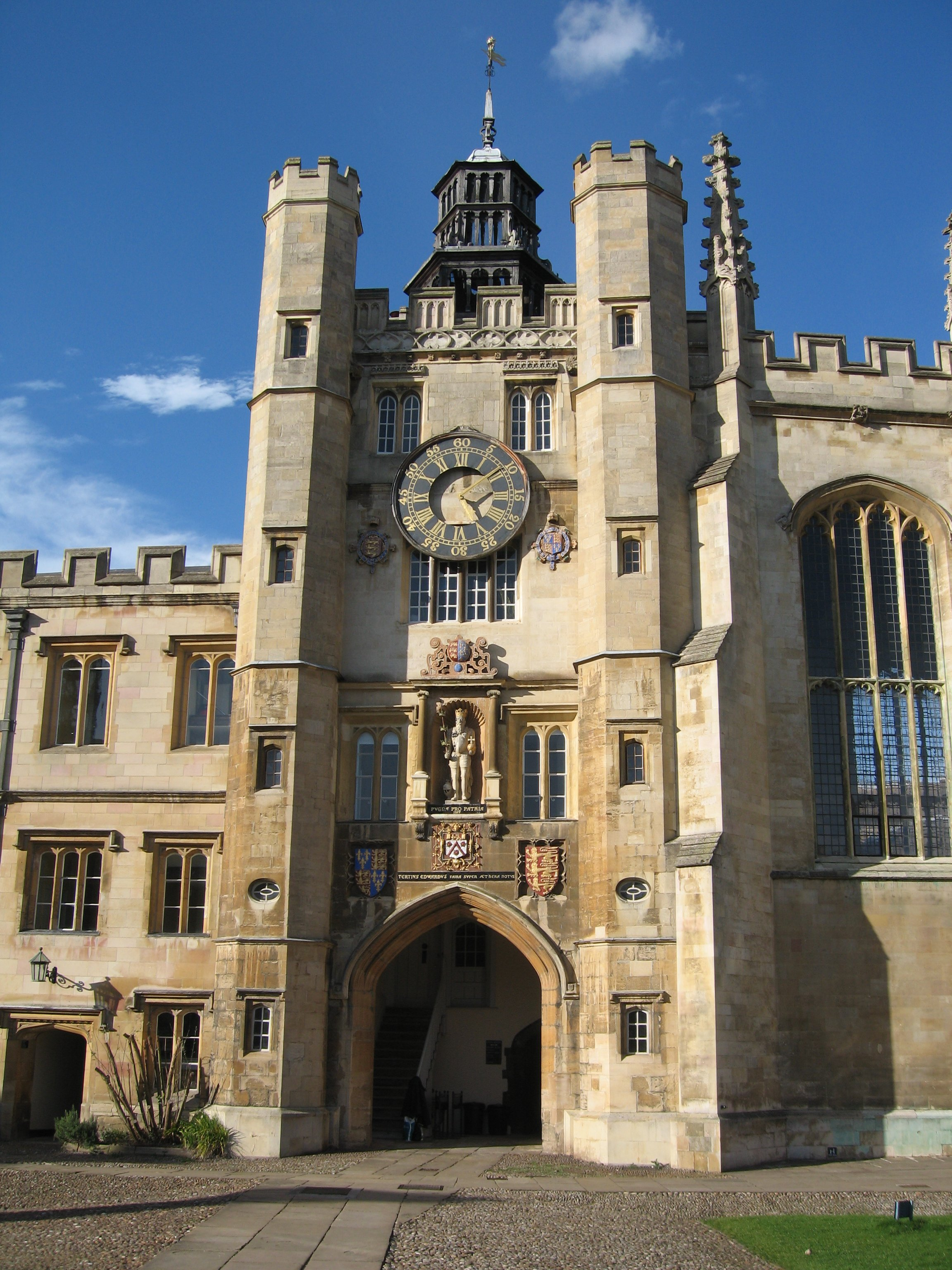
Clock Tower

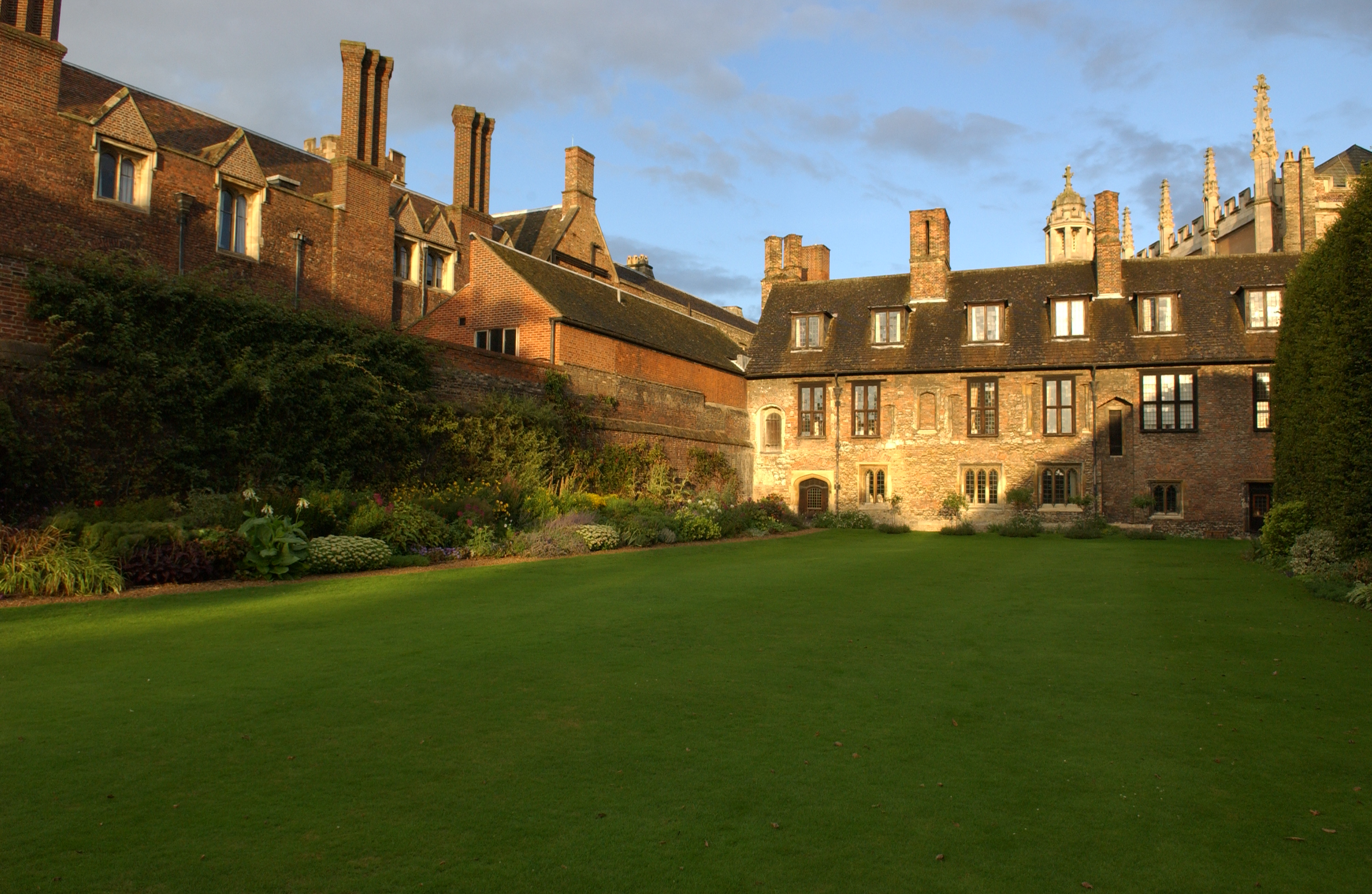
Fellows' Bowling Green, with the oldest building in the college in the background.

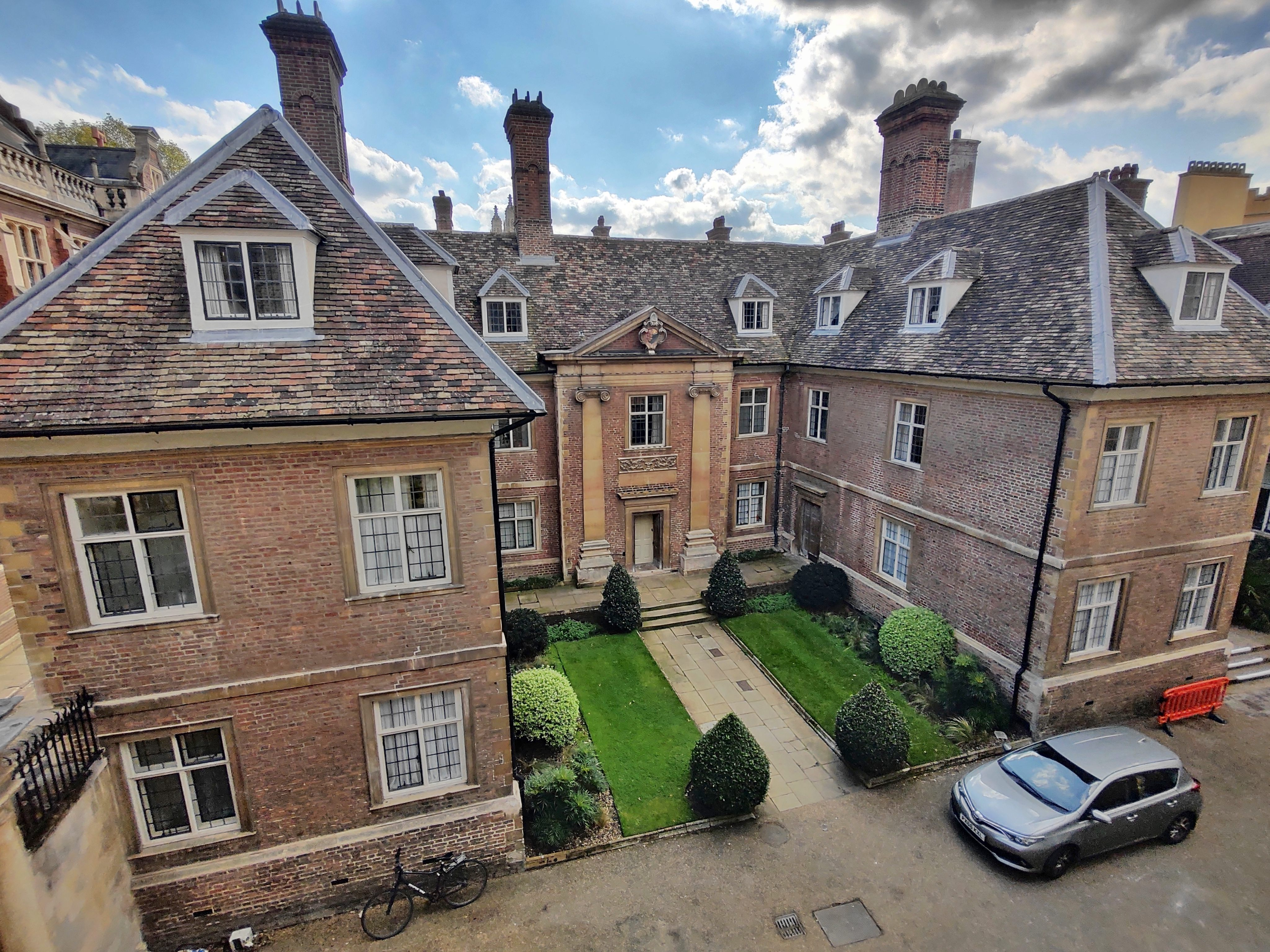
Bishop's Hostel viewed from Great Court.

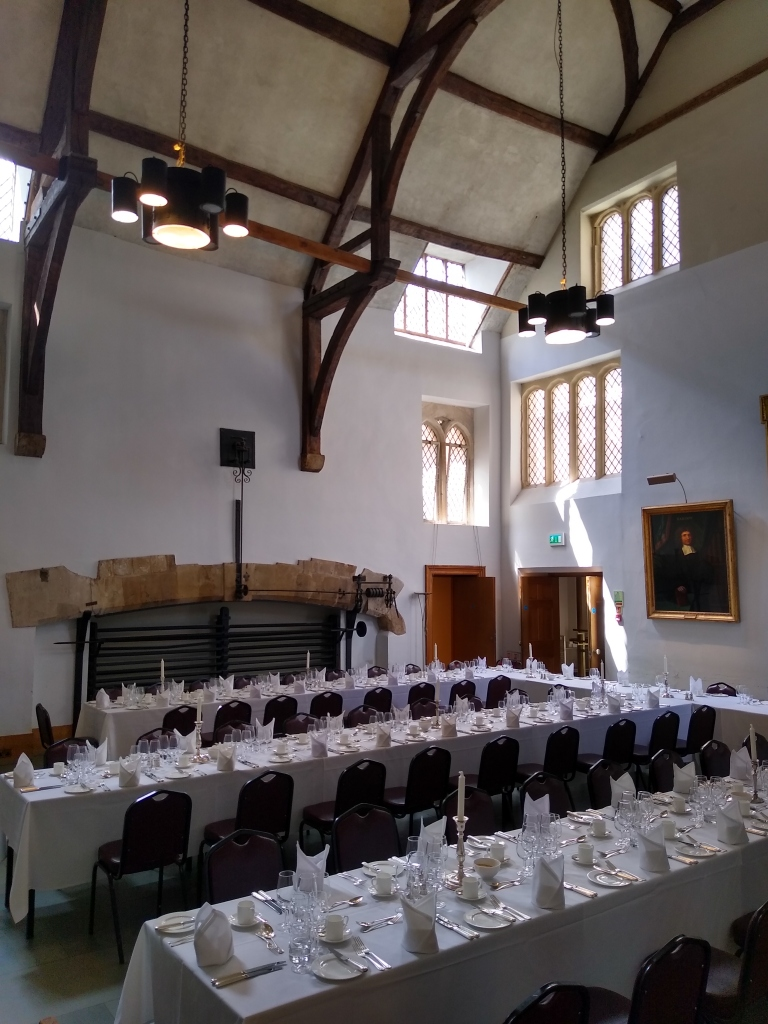
Old Kitchen set up for a formal dinner.

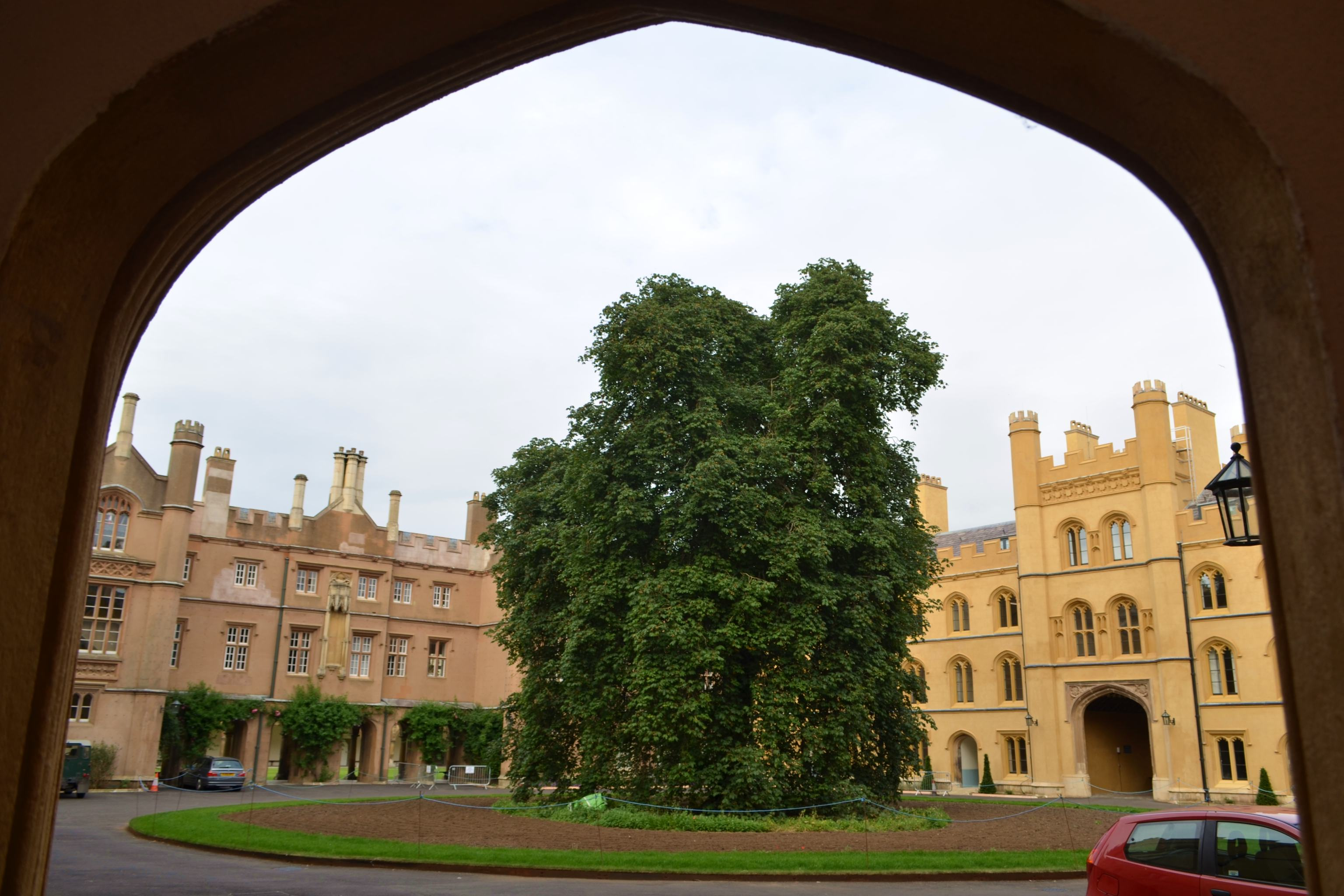
New Court after 2016 refurbishment.

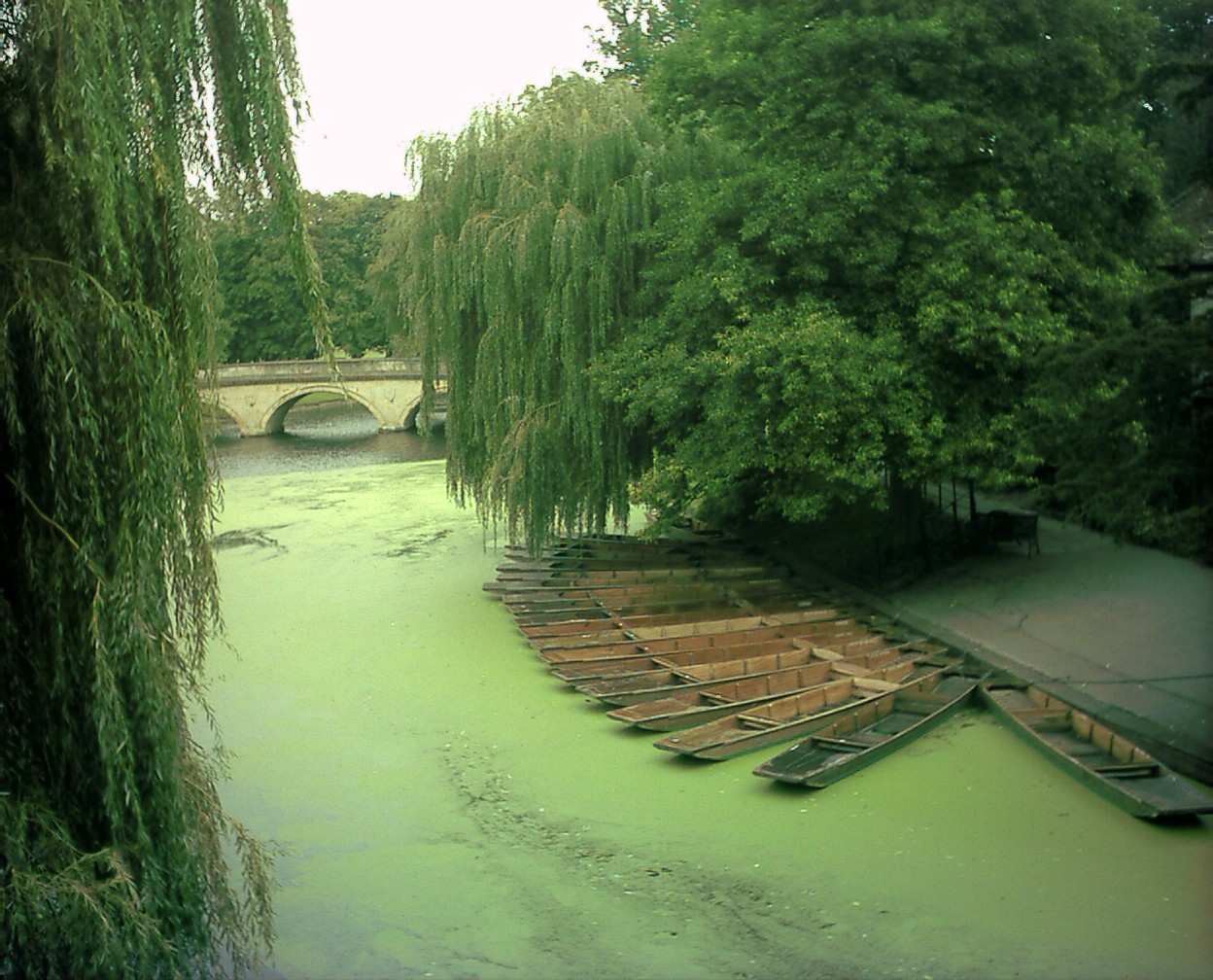
The River Cam as it flows past the back of Trinity, Trinity Bridge is visible and the punt house is to the right of the moored punts.

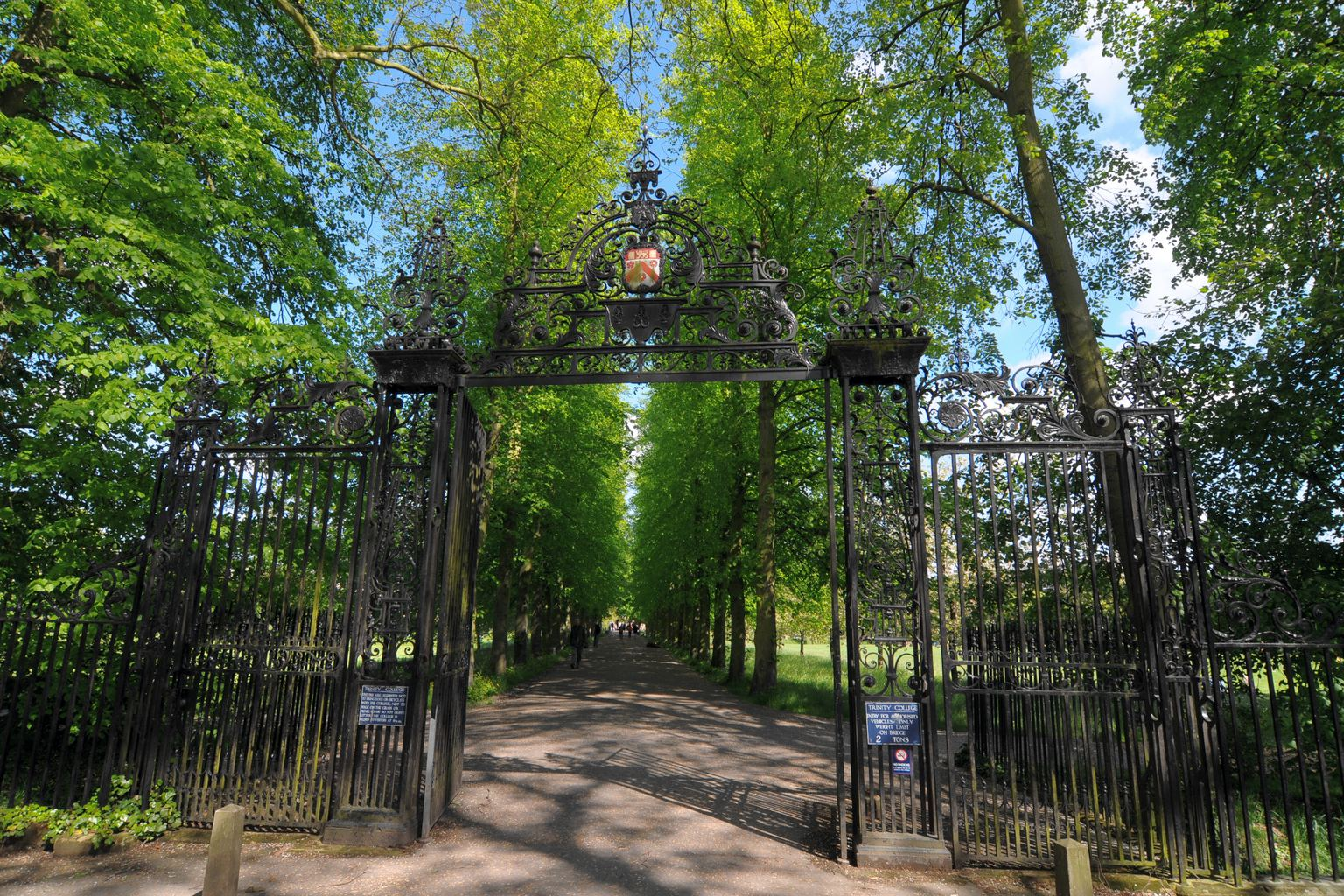
The Avenue of lime and cherry trees, and wrought iron gate to Queen's Road viewed from the Backs.

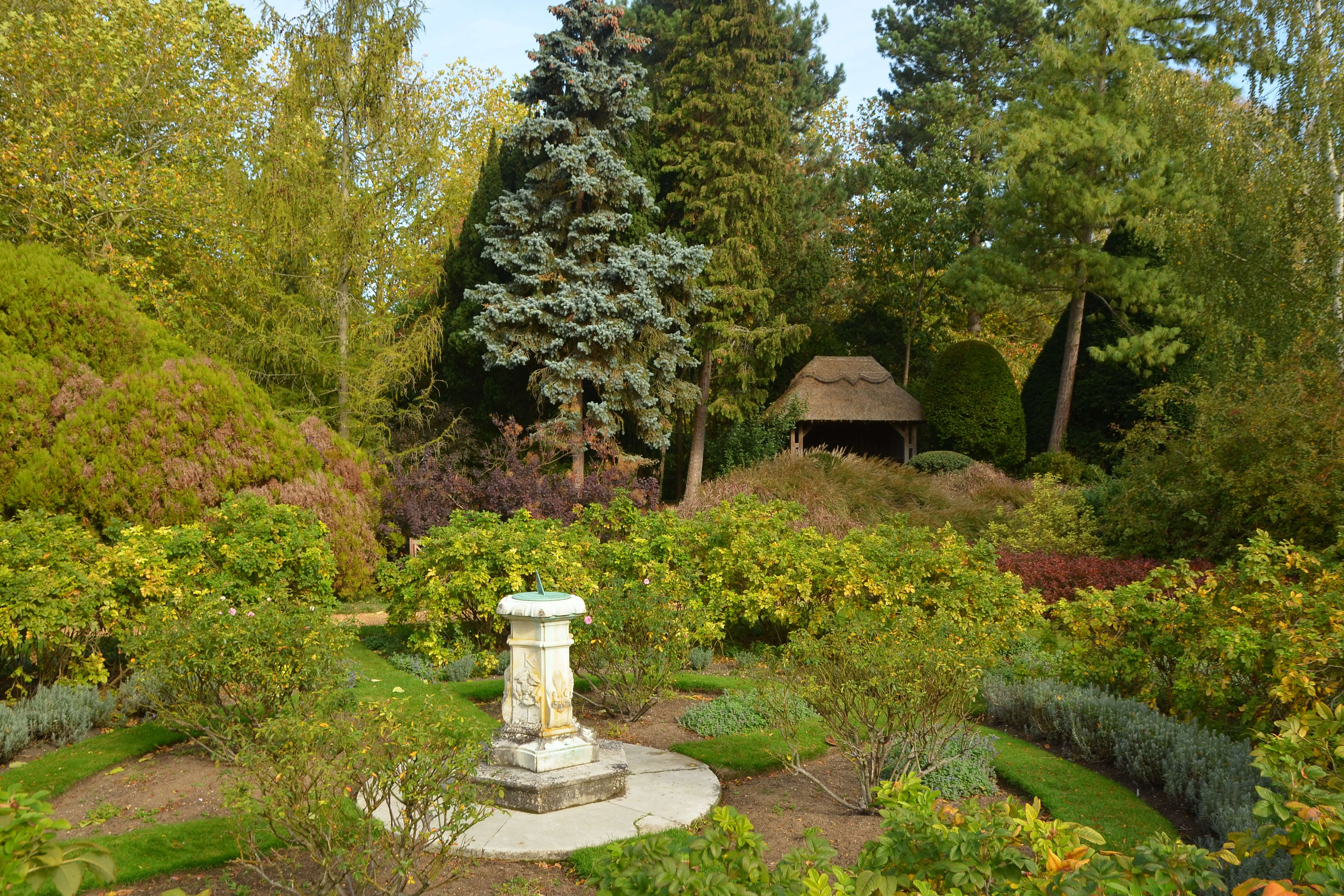
Sundial and shelter at the Fellows' Garden.

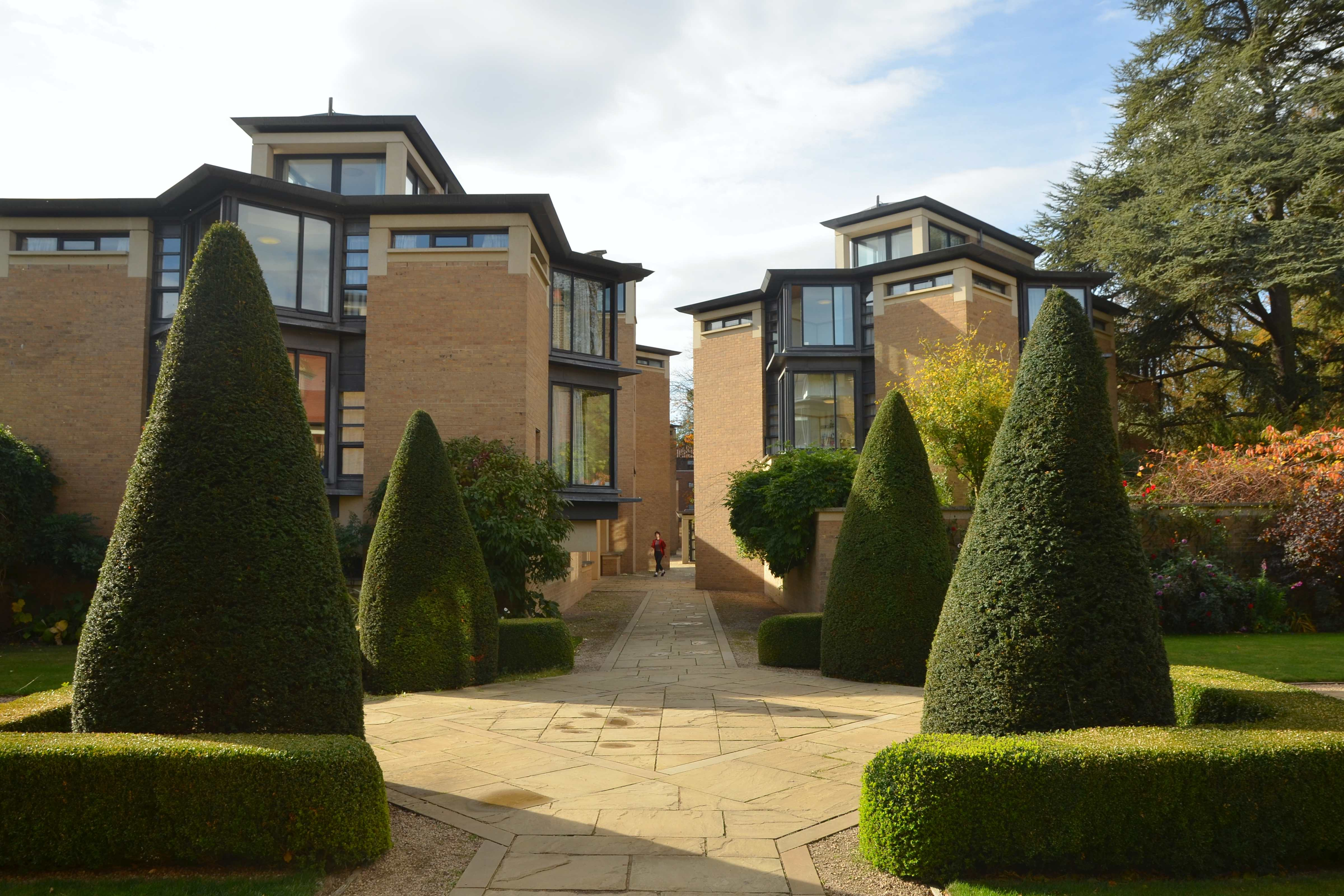
1995 development of Burrell's Field.

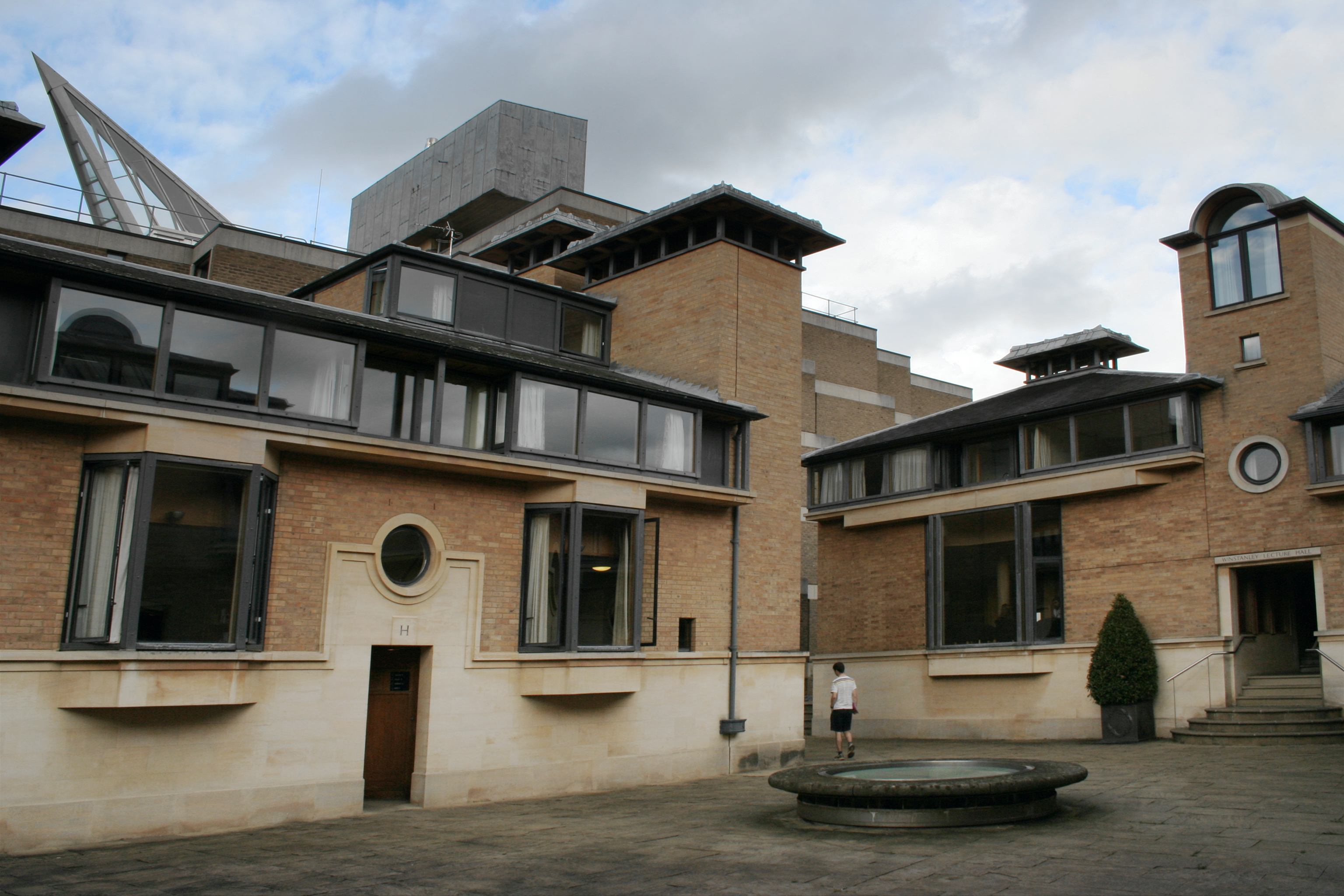
Blue Boar Court, with the Wolfson Building in the background.

== Academic profile ==
Since 1997, the college has always come at least eighth in the Tompkins Table, which ranks the twenty-nine undergraduate Cambridge colleges according to the academic performance of their undergraduates, and on eleven occasions it has been in first place. Its average position in the Tompkins Table over that period has been between second and third, higher than any other. In 2016, 45% of Trinity undergraduates achieved first-class honours, twelve percentage points ahead of second place Pembroke – a record among Cambridge colleges.

=== Admissions ===
Trinity's history, academic performance and alumni have made it one of the most prestigious constituent colleges of the university, making admission extremely competitive. About 50% of Trinity's undergraduates attended independent schools. In 2006 it accepted a smaller proportion of students from state schools (39%) than any other Cambridge college, and on a rolling three-year average it has admitted a smaller proportion of state school pupils (42%) than any other college at either Cambridge or Oxford. According to the Good Schools Guide, about 7% of British school-age students attend private schools, although this figure refers to students in all school years – a higher proportion attend private schools in their final two years before university. Trinity states that it disregards what type of school its applicants attend, and accepts students solely on the basis of their academic prospects. Trinity admitted its first female graduate student in 1976, its first female undergraduate in 1978 and elected its first female fellow (Marian Hobson) in 1977.

=== Scholarships and prizes ===
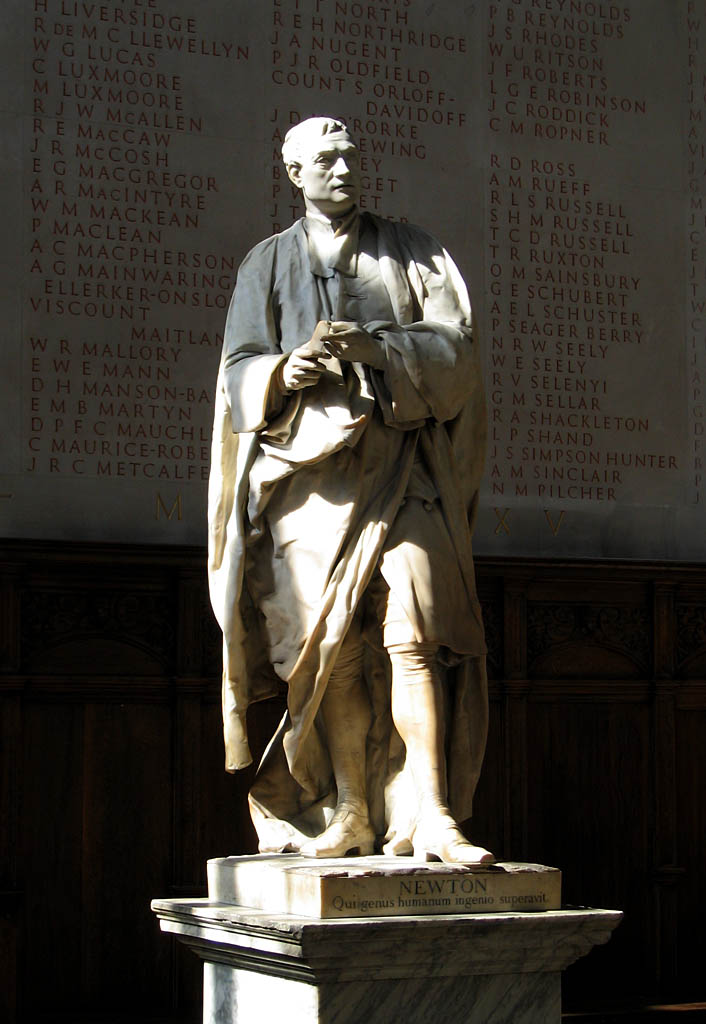
The statue of Sir Isaac Newton in the chapel, where scholars are typically installed.

The Scholars, together with the Master and Fellows, make up the Foundation of the College. In order of seniority:

- Research Scholars receive funding for graduate studies. Typically, one must graduate in the top ten percent of one's class and continue for graduate study at Trinity. They are given first preference in the assignment of college rooms and number approximately 25.
- The Senior Scholars usually consist of those who attain a degree with first-class honours or higher in any year after the first of an undergraduate tripos. The college pays them a stipend of £250 a year and allows them to choose rooms directly following the research scholars. There are around 40 senior scholars at any one time.
- The Junior Scholars usually consist of those who attained a First in their first year. Their stipend is £300 a year. They are given preference in the room ballot over 2nd years who are not scholars.

These scholarships are tenable for the academic year following that in which the result was achieved. If a scholarship is awarded but the student does not continue at Trinity then only a quarter of the stipend is given. However, all students who achieve a First are awarded an additional £400 prize upon announcement of the results.

Many final year undergraduates who achieve first-class honours in their final exams are offered full financial support, through a scheme known as Internal Graduate Studentships, to read for a master's degree at Cambridge. Other support is available for PhD degrees. The College also offers a number of other bursaries and studentships open to external applicants. The right to walk on the grass in the college courts is exclusive to Fellows of the college and their guests. Scholars do, however, have the right to walk on the Scholars' Lawn, but only in full academic dress.

== Traditions ==
=== Great Court Run ===
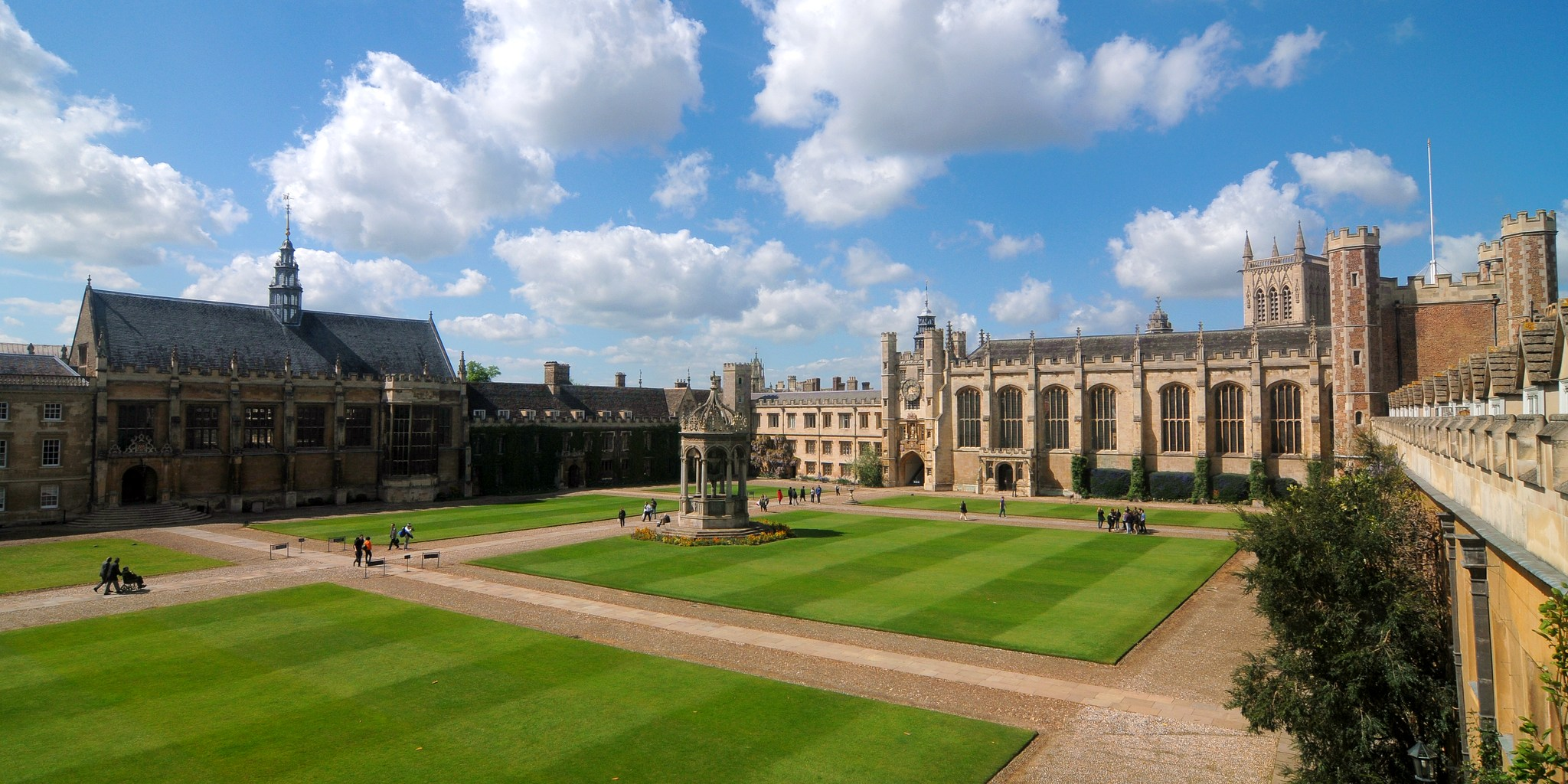
Great Court, with (from left to right) the dining hall, Master's Lodge, fountain, clock tower, chapel and Great Gate.

The Great Court Run requires a circuit of the 400-yard perimeter of Great Court, in the 43 seconds of the clock striking 12. The time varies according to humidity. Students traditionally attempt to complete the circuit on the day of the Matriculation Dinner. It is a difficult challenge: one needs to be a fine sprinter to achieve it, but it is not necessary to be of Olympic standard, despite assertions made in the press.

It is widely believed that Sebastian Coe successfully completed the run when he beat Steve Cram in a charity race in October 1988. Coe's time on 29 October 1988 was reported by Norris McWhirter to have been 45.52 seconds, but it was actually 46.0 seconds, while Cram's was 46.3 seconds. The clock on that day took 44.4 seconds and the video film confirms that Coe was some 12 metres short of the finish line when the final stroke occurred. The television commentators were wrong to speculate that the dying sounds of the bell could be included in the striking time, thereby allowing Coe's run to be claimed as successful. One reason Olympic runners Cram and Coe found the challenge difficult is that they started at the middle of one side of the court, having to negotiate four right-angle turns. In the days when students started at a corner, only three turns were needed. In addition, Cram and Coe ran entirely on the flagstones, while until 2017 students have typically cut corners to run on the cobbles.

The Great Court Run was portrayed in the film Chariots of Fire about the British Olympic runners of 1924. The run was filmed at Eton College in Berkshire, not in Great Court. Until the mid-1990s, the run was traditionally attempted by first-year students at midnight following their matriculation dinner. Following a number of accidents to undergraduates running on slippery cobbles, the college now organises a more formal Great Court Run, at 12 noon on the day of the matriculation dinner: while some contestants compete seriously, many others run in fancy dress and there are prizes for the fastest man and woman in each category.

=== Open-air concerts ===
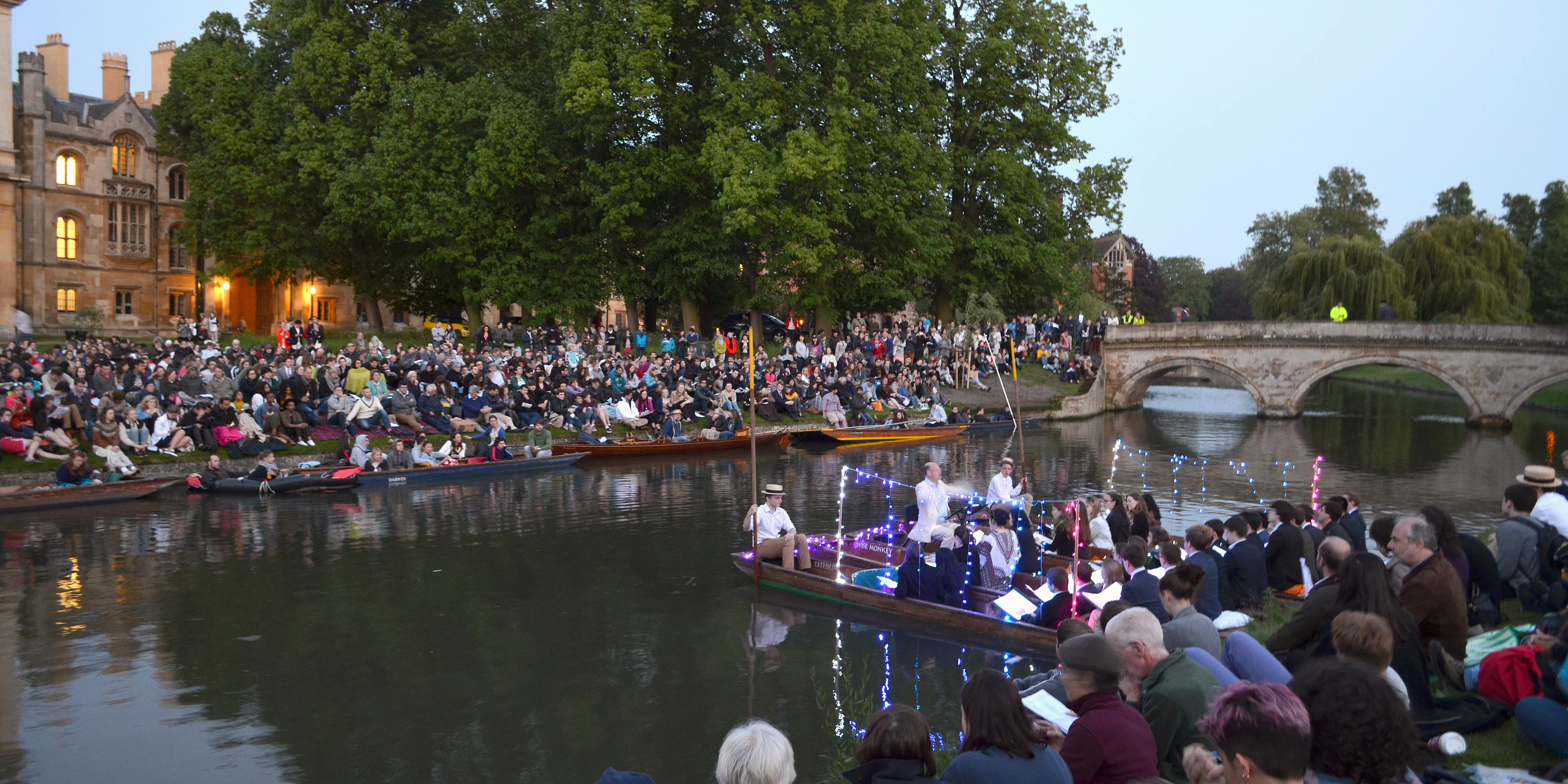
Singing on the River, 5 June 2016

One Sunday each June, the College Choir perform a short concert immediately after the clock strikes noon. Known as Singing from the Towers, half of the choir sings from the top of the Great Gate, while the other half sings from the top of the Clock Tower approximately 60 metres away, giving a strong antiphonal effect. Midway through the concert, the Cambridge University Brass Ensemble performs from the top of the Queen's Tower.

Later that same day, the College Choir gives a second open-air concert, known as Singing on the River, where they perform madrigals and arrangements of popular songs from a raft of punts lit with lanterns or fairy lights on the river. For the finale, John Wilbye's madrigal Draw on, sweet night, the raft is unmoored and punted downstream to give a fade out effect. As a tradition, however, this latter concert dates back only to the mid-1980s, when the College Choir first acquired female members. In the years immediately before this, an annual concert on the river was given by the University Madrigal Society.

=== Mallard ===
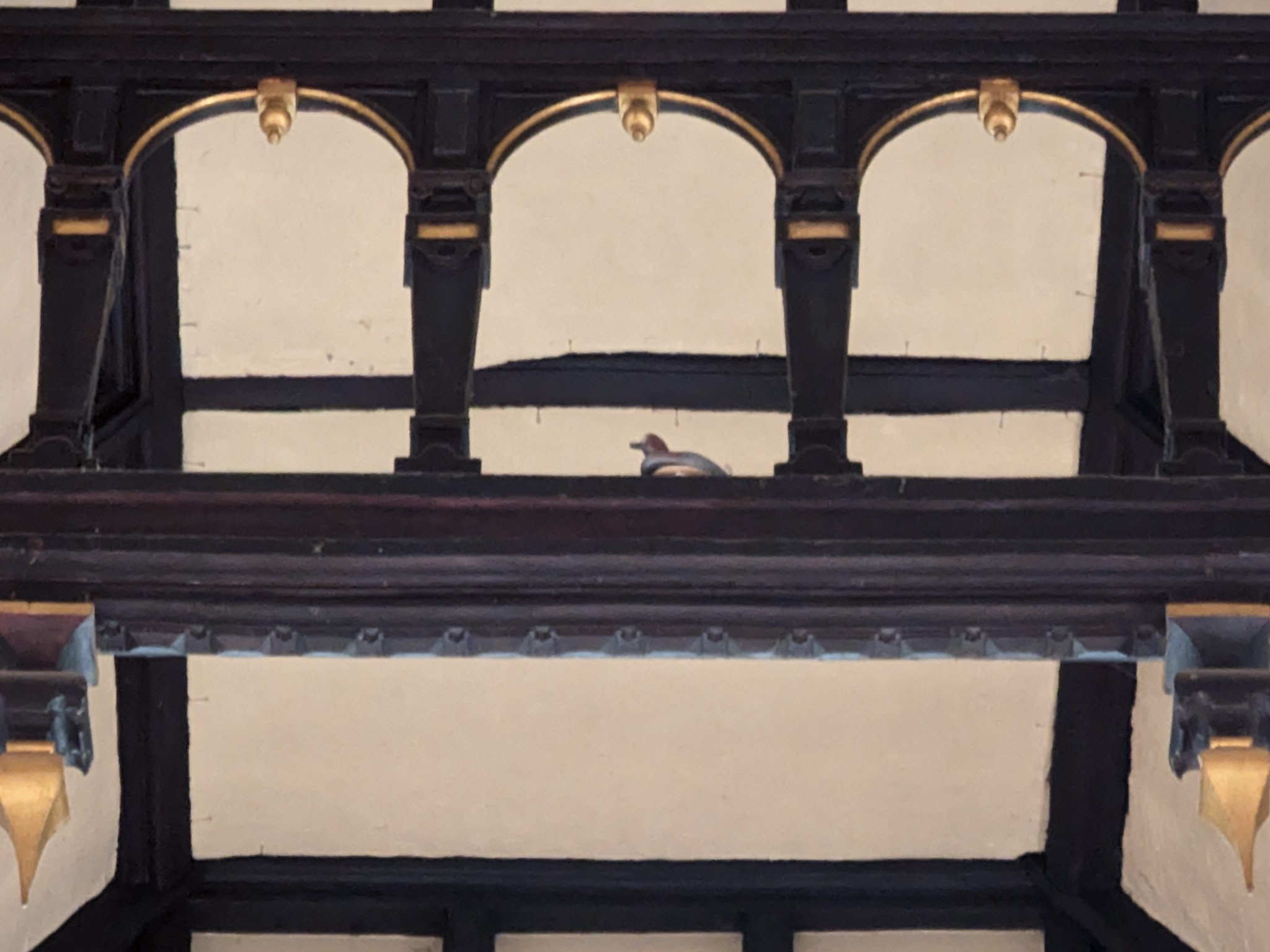
The mallard in the hall's rafters

Another tradition relates to an artificial duck known as the Mallard, which should reside in the rafters of the Great Hall. Students occasionally moved the duck from one rafter to another without permission from the college. This is considered difficult; access to the Hall outside meal-times is prohibited and the rafters are dangerously high, so it was not attempted for several years. During the Easter term of 2006, the Mallard was knocked off its rafter by one of the pigeons which enter the Hall through the pinnacle windows. It was reinstated by students in 2016, and is visible from only the far end of the hall.

=== College rivalry ===
The college remains a great rival of St John's which is its main competitor in sports and academia. This has given rise to a number of anecdotes and myths. It is often cited as the reason that the older courts of Trinity generally have no J staircases, despite including other letters in alphabetical order. A far more likely reason is that the Latin alphabet did not have the letter J—the older courts of St John's College also lack J staircases. There are also two small muzzle-loading cannons on the bowling green pointing in the direction of John's, though this orientation may be coincidental. Another story sometimes told is that the reason that the clock in Trinity Great Court strikes each hour twice is that the fellows of St John's once complained about the noise it made.

=== College Grace ===
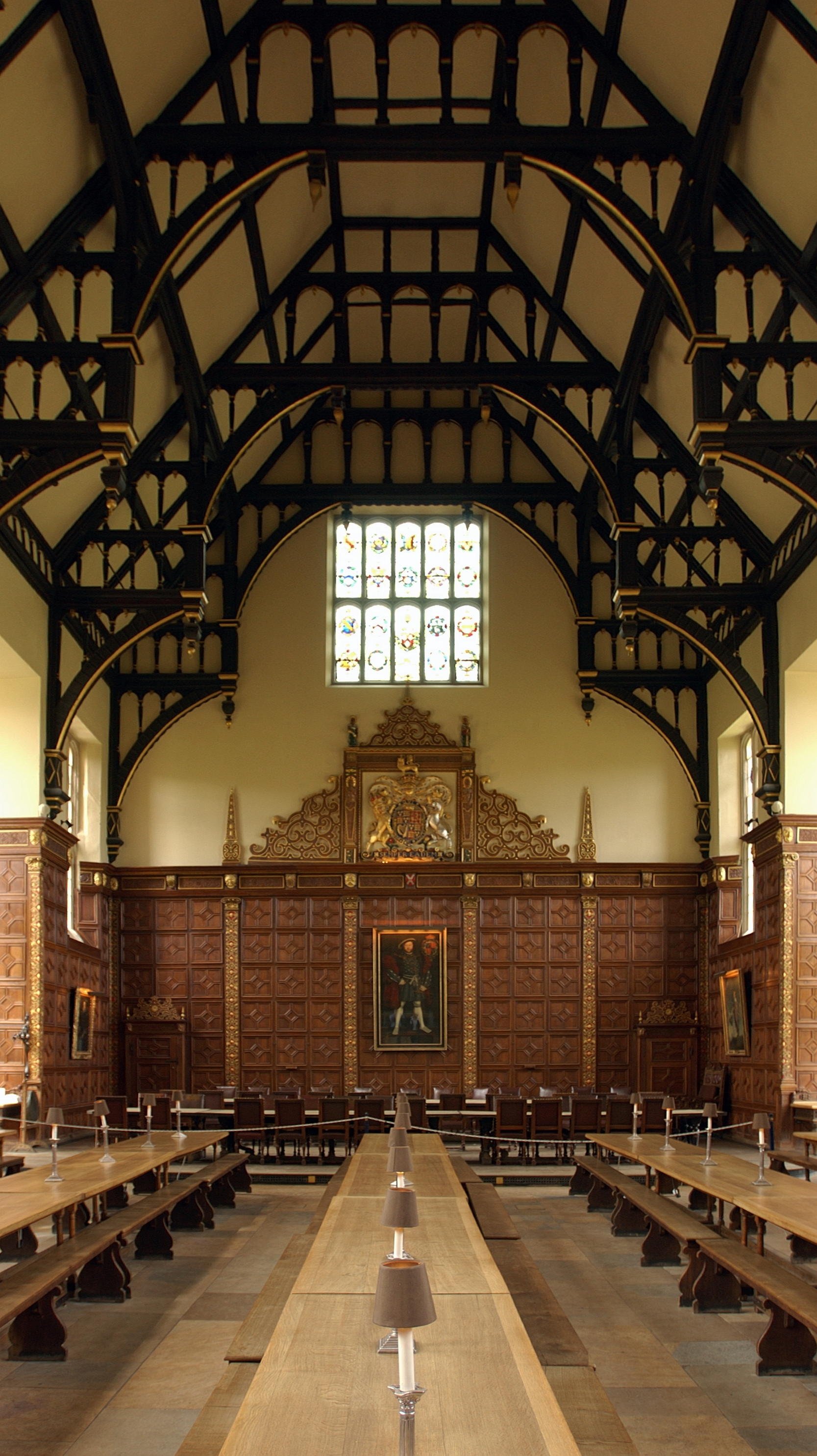
The High Table is at the far end of the dining hall under the portrait of Henry VIII.

Each evening before dinner, grace is recited by the senior fellow presiding, as follows:

Benedic, Domine, nos et dona tua,
quae de largitate tua sumus sumpturi,
et concede, ut illis salubriter nutriti
tibi debitum obsequium praestare valeamus,
per Christum Dominum nostrum.

Translation:

Bless us, Lord, and these gifts
which, through your generosity, we are about to receive
and grant that we, wholesomely nourished by them,
may be able to offer you the service we owe
through Christ our Lord.

If both of the two high tables are in use then the following antiphonal formula is prefixed to the main grace:

A. Oculi omnium in te sperant Domine:
B. Et tu das escam illis in tempore.
A. Aperis tu manum tuam,
B. Et imples omne animal benedictione.

Translation:

The eyes of all are on you, Lord:
and you give them their food, in due time.
You open your hand
and bestow upon all living things your blessing.

Following the meal, the simple formula Benedicto benedicatur is pronounced.

=== Punt names ===
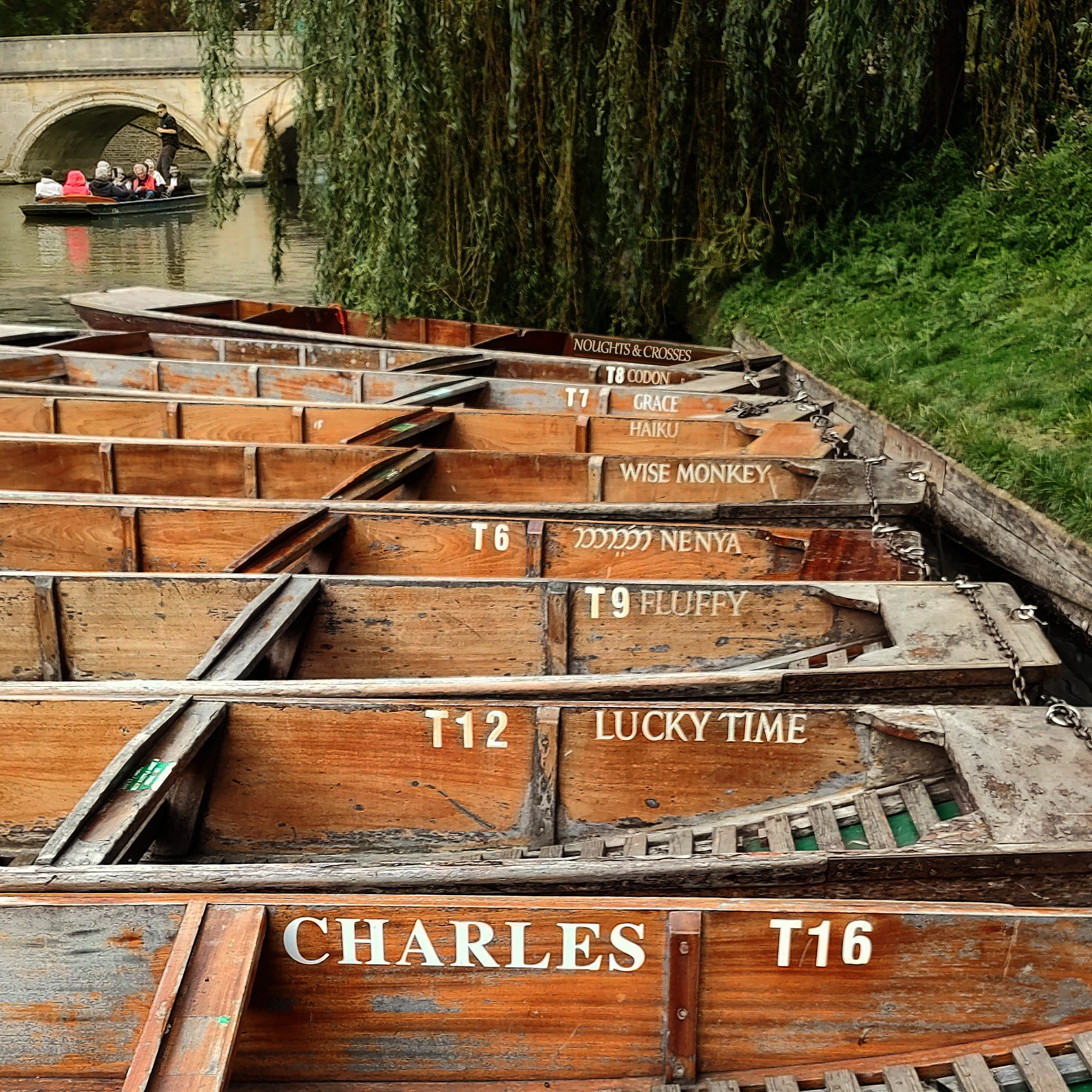
Trinity punts moored near the Trinity Bridge

Befitting the term trinity, Trinity College punts are named after people or things related to the number three, such as Bronze (award for third place), Codon (which has three nucleotides) and Wise Monkey. In 2023, the launch of the punt Charles marked the coronation of alumnus Charles III.

=== Minor traditions ===
Trinity College undergraduate gowns are readily distinguished from the black gowns favoured by most other Cambridge colleges. They are instead dark blue with black facings. They are expected to be worn to formal events such as formal halls and also when an undergraduate sees the Dean of the College in a formal capacity. Trinity students, along with those of King's and St John's, are the first to be presented to the Congregation of the Regent House at graduation.

== People associated with Trinity ==
=== Notable fellows and alumni ===
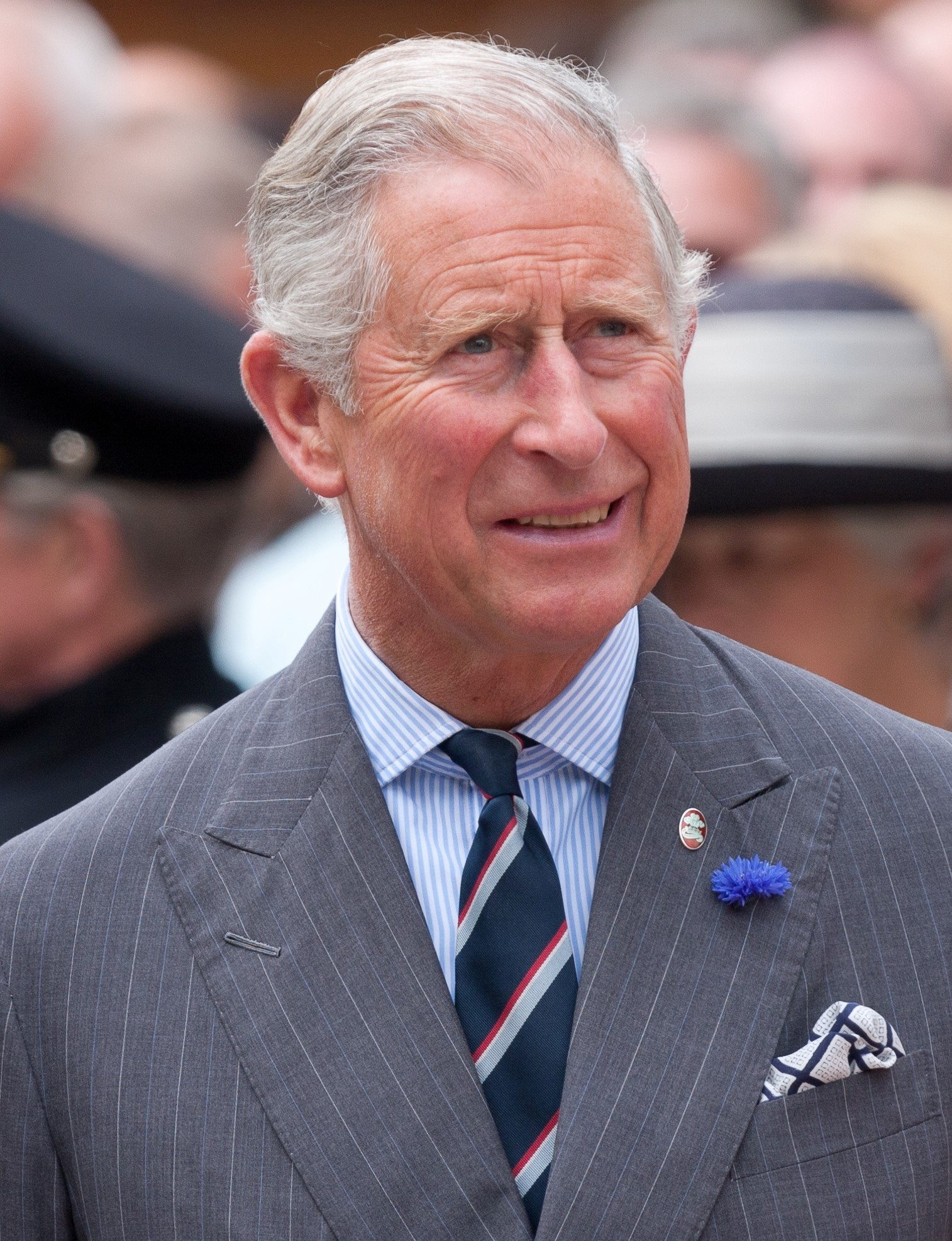
Charles III, King of the United Kingdom

The Parish of the Ascension Burial Ground in Cambridge contains the graves of 27 Fellows of Trinity College, Cambridge most of whom are also commemorated in Trinity College Chapel with brass plaques. Prince William of Gloucester and Edinburgh, who attended and was awarded an MA degree in 1790. Charles III, King of the United Kingdom, attended from 1967 to 1970, and was awarded a lower-second class BA degree in 1970. Marian Hobson was the first woman to become a Fellow of the college, having been elected in 1977, and her portrait now hangs in the college hall along with those of other notable members of the college. Other notable female Fellows include Anne Barton, Marilyn Strathern, Catherine Barnard, Lynn Gladden and Rebecca Fitzgerald.

=== Nobel Prize winners ===
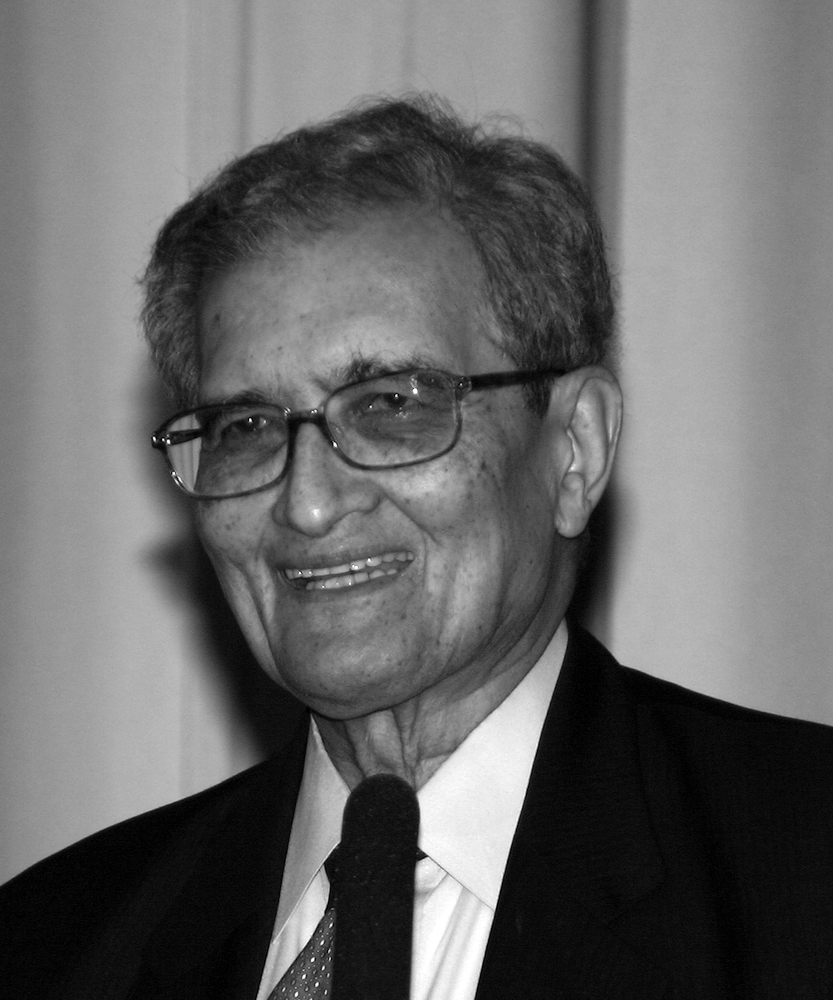
Amartya Sen

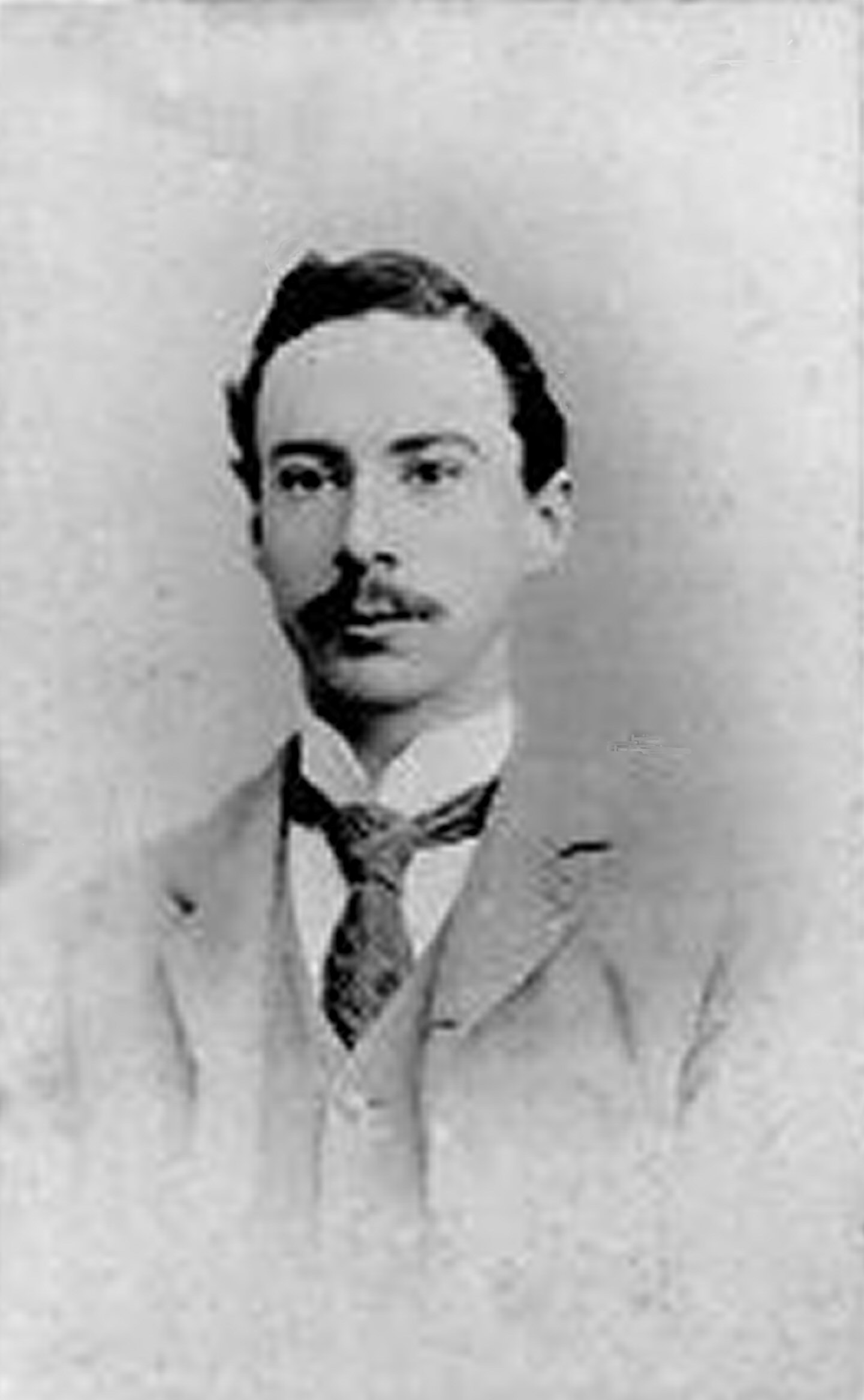
Bertrand Russell

This list includes winners of the Nobel Memorial Prize in Economic Sciences, which is not one of the five Nobel Prizes established by Alfred Nobel's will in 1895.

Name	Field	Year
John Strutt, 3rd Baron Rayleigh	Physics	1904
Joseph John (J. J.) Thomson	Physics	1906
Ernest Rutherford	Chemistry	1908
William Bragg	Physics	1915
Lawrence Bragg	Physics	1915
Charles Glover Barkla	Physics	1917
Niels Bohr	Physics	1922
Francis William Aston	Chemistry	1922
Archibald V. Hill	Physiology or Medicine	1922
Austen Chamberlain	Peace	1925
Owen Willans Richardson	Physics	1928
Frederick Hopkins	Physiology or Medicine	1929
Edgar Douglas Adrian	Physiology or Medicine	1932
Henry Dale	Physiology or Medicine	1936
George Paget Thomson	Physics	1937
Bertrand Russell	Literature	1950
Ernest Walton	Physics	1951
Richard Synge	Chemistry	1952
John Kendrew	Chemistry	1962
Alan Hodgkin	Physiology or Medicine	1963
Andrew Huxley	Physiology or Medicine	1963
Brian David Josephson	Physics	1973
Martin Ryle	Physics	1974
James Meade	Economic Sciences	1977
Pyotr Kapitsa	Physics	1978
Walter Gilbert	Chemistry	1980
Aaron Klug	Chemistry	1982
Subrahmanyan Chandrasekhar	Physics	1983
James Mirrlees	Economic Sciences	1996
John Pople	Chemistry	1998
Amartya Sen	Economic Sciences	1998
Venkatraman Ramakrishnan	Chemistry	2009
Sir Gregory Paul Winter	Chemistry	2018
Didier Queloz	Physics	2019

=== Fields Medalists ===
Four members or alumni of Trinity College have been awarded the Fields Medal.

Name	Year
Michael Atiyah	1966
Alan Baker	1970
Richard Borcherds	1998
Timothy Gowers	1998

=== Turing Award winners ===
Name	Year
James H. Wilkinson	1970

=== British prime ministers ===
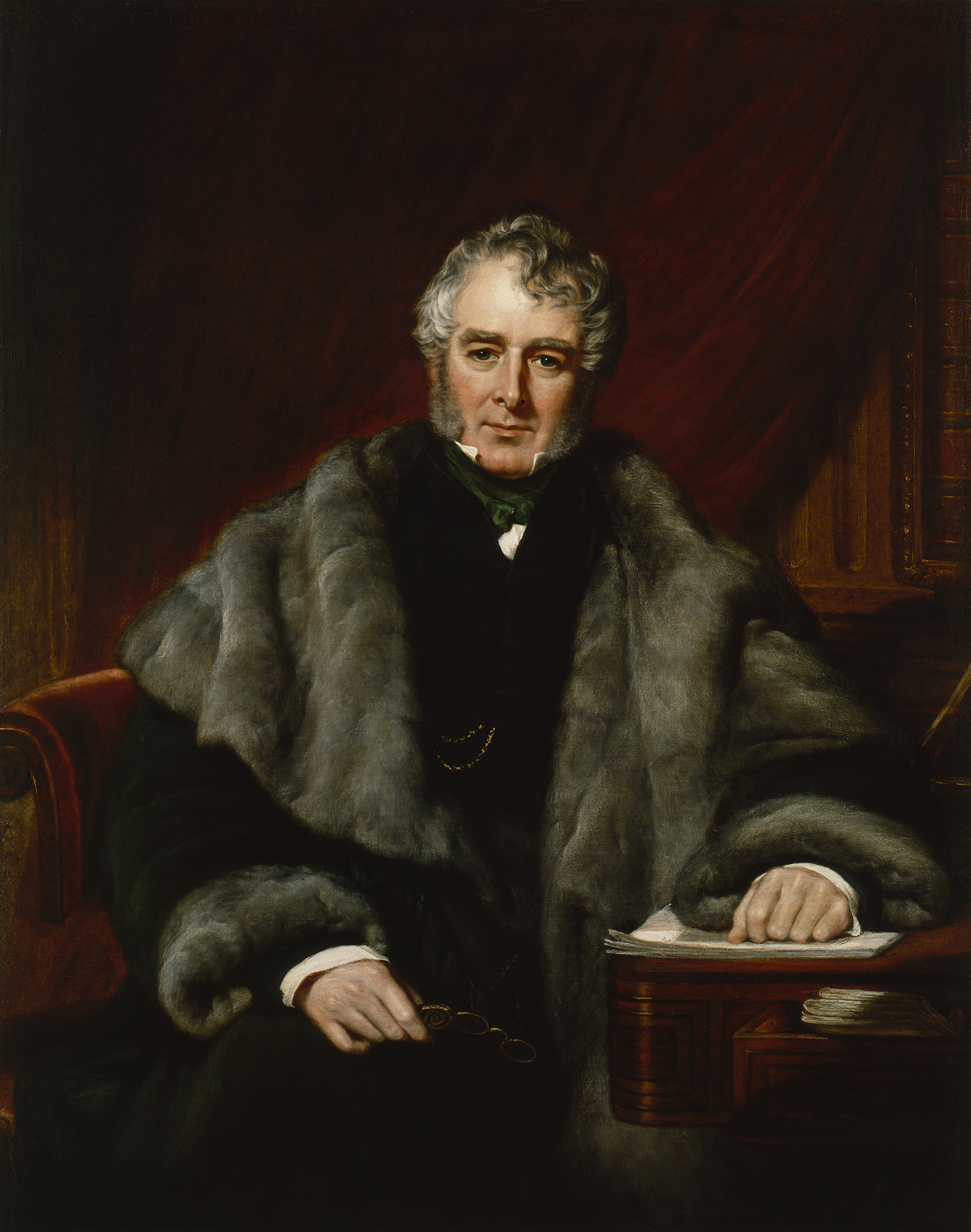
Portrait of Lord Melbourne, 1844. Lord Melbourne whose name gave rise to the Australian city Melbourne served as Prime Minister in 1834–1841

Name	Party	Year
Spencer Perceval	Tory	1809–1812
Charles Grey, 2nd Earl Grey	Whig	1830–1834
William Lamb, 2nd Viscount Melbourne	Whig	1834–1841
Arthur Balfour	Conservative	1902–1905
Henry Campbell-Bannerman	Liberal	1905–1908
Stanley Baldwin	Conservative	1923–1924; 1924–1929; 1935–1937

Other Trinity politicians include Robert Devereux, 2nd Earl of Essex, courtier of Elizabeth I; William Waddington, Prime Minister of France; Erskine Hamilton Childers, fourth president of Ireland; Jawaharlal Nehru, the first and longest-serving prime minister of India; Rajiv Gandhi, Prime Minister of India; Lee Hsien Loong, Prime Minister of Singapore; Samir Rifai, Prime Minister of Jordan; Richard Blumenthal, incumbent senior US senator from Connecticut; and William Whitelaw, home secretary and subsequently deputy prime minister.

=== Masters ===
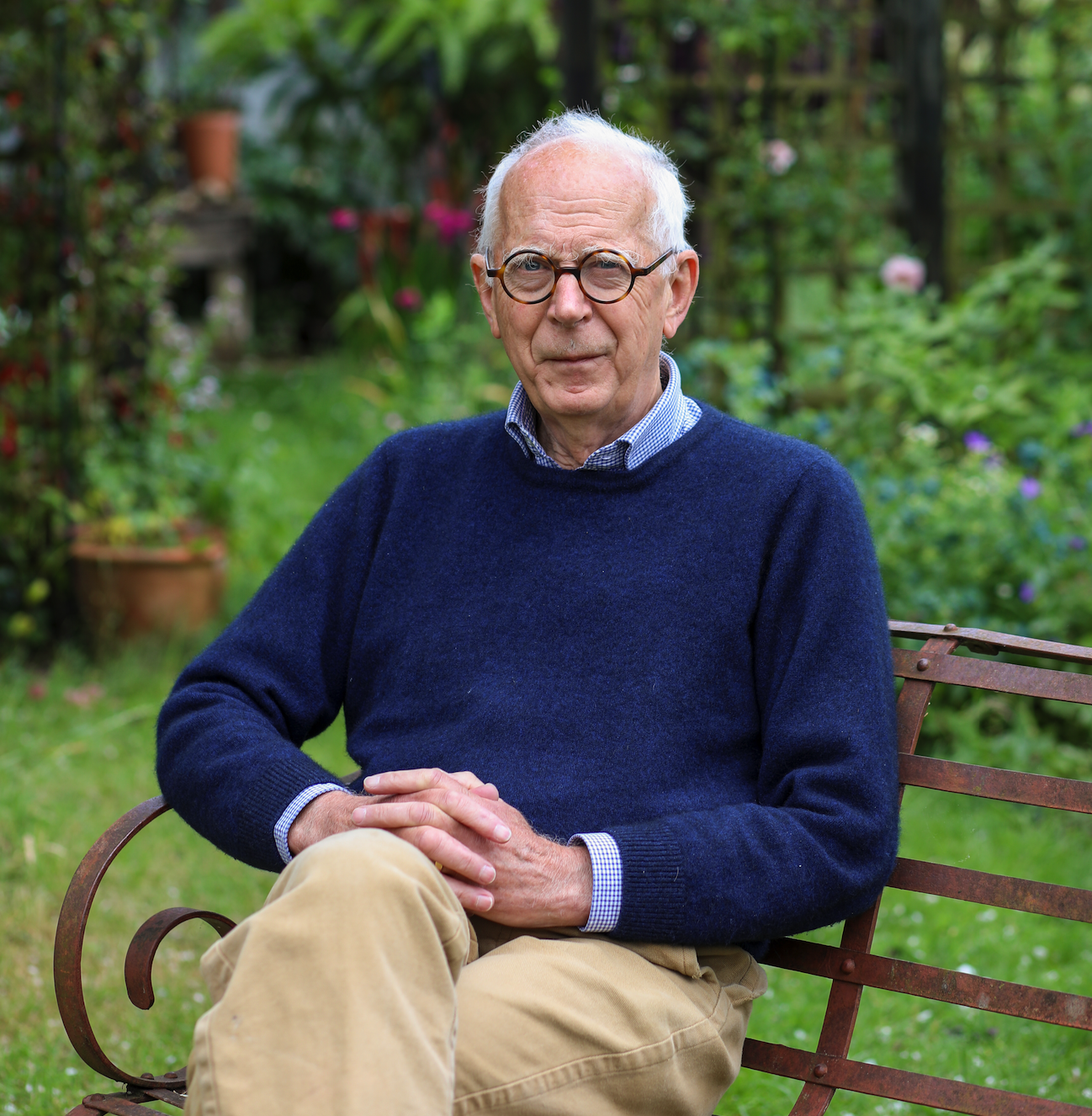
Sir David Baulcombe, current Master of Trinity

The head of Trinity College is called the Master. The role is a Crown appointment, formally made by the monarch on the advice of the prime minister. Nowadays, the fellows of the college propose a new master for the appointment, but the decision is formally that of the Crown. The first Master, John Redman, was appointed in 1546. Six masters subsequent to Rab Butler had been fellows of the college prior to becoming master (honorary fellow in the case of Martin Rees), the last of these being Sir Gregory Winter, appointed on 2 October 2012. He was succeeded by Dame Sally Davies, the first female Master of Trinity College, on 8 October 2019, who was succeeded in turn by Sir David Baulcombe on 6 October 2026.

== See also ==
- Isaac Newton Institute for Mathematical Sciences, partially funded by Trinity
