= List of masters of Magdalene College, Cambridge =

The following have served as masters of Magdalene College, Cambridge:

- 1544–1546: Robert Evans
- 1546–1559: Richard Carre
- 1559–1576: Roger Kelke
- 1576–1577: Richard Howland
- 1577–1582: Degory Nicholls
- 1582–1593: Thomas Nevile
- 1593–1595: Richard Clayton
- 1595–1604: John Palmer
- 1604–1626: Barnabas Gooch
- 1626–1642: Henry Smyth
- 1642–1650: Edward Rainbow
- 1650–1660: John Sadler
- 1660–1664: Edward Rainbow
- 1664–1668: John Howorth
- 1668–1679: James Duport
- 1679–1690: John Peachell
- 1690–1713: Gabriel Quadring
- 1713–1740: Daniel Waterland
- 1740–1746: Edward Abbott
- 1746–1760: Thomas Chapman
- 1760–1774: George Sandby
- 1774–1781: Barton Wallop
- 1781–1797: Peter Peckard
- 1797–1813: William Gretton
- 1813–1853: George Neville-Grenville
- 1853–1904: Latimer Neville, 6th Baron Braybrooke
- 1904–1915: Stuart Alexander Donaldson
- 1915–1925: Arthur Christopher Benson
- 1925–1947: Allen Beville Ramsay
- 1947–1966: Sir Henry Willink
- 1966–1978: Walter Hamilton
- 1978–1985: Sir Derman Christopherson
- 1985–1994: Sir David Calcutt
- 1994–2002: Sir John Gurdon
- 2002–2012: Duncan Robinson CBE
- 2013–2020: Rowan Williams, Lord Williams of Oystermouth FBA FRSL FLSW
- 2020–: Sir Christopher Greenwood
