= Joshua Bassett (disambiguation) =

Joshua Bassett (born 2000) is an American actor and singer.

Joshua Bassett may also refer to:

- Joshua Bassett (academic) or Basset (c. 1641–c.1720), master of Sidney Sussex College, Cambridge
- Josh Bassett (born Joshua Marcus Andrew Bassett; 1992), English rugby union player
