= John Balderston =

John Balderston may refer to:

- John L. Balderston (1889–1954), American playwright and screenwriter
- John Balderston (academic) (died 1719), vice-chancellor of the University of Cambridge
