= John Clarke (dean of Salisbury) =

English natural philosopher

John Clarke (1682–1757) was an English natural philosopher and Dean of Salisbury from 1728 to his death in 1757.

== Life ==
He was a younger brother of Samuel Clarke, and was born at Norwich, his father being Edward Clarke, textile manufacturer and alderman (M.P. for Norwich 1701), who married Hannah, daughter of Samuel Parmeter. After grammar studies for six years under Mr. Nobbs at Norwich School, he was admitted a scholar of Gonville and Caius College, Cambridge, some time between Michaelmas 1699 and Michaelmas 1700. He graduated B.A. in 1703, M.A. in 1707, and had D.D. by royal command in 1717.

He was known as a mathematician, and lived much of his life at Cambridge. He held a prebend at Norwich, was a royal chaplain, and canon of Canterbury (1721). On 16 March 1728 he was instituted to the deanery of Salisbury. He died at Salisbury on 10 February 1757, and was buried in the cathedral, where a monument was erected to his memory by his daughters.

On 10 March 1706/7 at Norwich, Clarke married Frances Pell, daughter of Valentine Pell, an apothecary and his wife, Frances Rively, daughter of Benedict Rively (d. 1694/5), clergyman. They had eight children, four sons and four daughters.

Clarke surviving son, John (b. 1710), who was a Fellow of Corpus Christi College, Cambridge, and then vicar of Sonning, dying in 1741. The younger John Clarke engaged in controversy with Joseph Clarke, an opponent of the views of his uncle Samuel Clarke. William Cole described John Clarke the younger as a lecturer in natural philosophy, and supplied details of his engagement to a French woman in exile.

== Descendants ==
Charles Poulett Thomson, 1st Baron Sydenham and George Julius Poulett Scrope, sons of Charlotte Thomson née Jacob, Clarke's granddaughter.

== Works ==
His own works include:

- An Enquiry into the Cause and Origin of Evil 1720, 2 vols. (the Boyle lecture for 1719; reproduced in vol. iii. of the abridgement of the Boyle lectures, 1739).
- A Demonstration of some of the principal sections of Sir Isaac Newton's Principles of Natural Philosophy, 1730.

Clarke's first literary work was a translation of Hugo Grotius, De Veritate, as 'The Truth of the Christian Religion,’ 1711, often reprinted. He edited Samuel Clarke's sermons and other works, especially his 'Exposition of the Church Catechism,’ 1730. He also followed his brother's steps in natural science. Samuel Clarke had translated into Latin, with notes, the 'Traité de Physique' (1671) of Jacques Rohault; John Clarke published an English translation from his brother's Latin, with additional notes, under the title, 'Rohault's System of Natural Philosophy' &c., 2 vols. He edited also the second edition, revised and improved, of Humphrey Ditton's 'An Institution of Fluxions,’ 1726.

In 1750, he prepared a new edition of William Wollaston's The Religion of Nature Delineated, to which he added a life of the author, and English translations (made some years earlier for the use of Queen Caroline) of the extensive Hebrew, Greek, and Latin quotations in the book's notes.
