= Clarkean =

Clarkean is an eponymous adjective and may refer to:

- Samuel Clarke (1675–1729), English philosopher
- Arthur C. Clarke (1917–2008), British science fiction writer and futurist
