= William Dudgeon =

William Dudgeon may refer to:

- William Dudgeon (poet) (c. 1753–1813), Scottish poet
- William Dudgeon (philosopher) (1705/6–1743), Scottish philosophical writer
- William Dudgeon, co-founder of J & W Dudgeon
