= Alban Francis =

English Roman Catholic Benedictine monk

Alban Francis (died 1715) was an English Roman Catholic Benedictine monk.

Francis was a native of Middlesex. He became a professed Benedictine monk on 9 May 1670, in the abbey of St Adrian and St Denis at Lamspringe in the Prince-Bishopric of Hildesheim. He assumed in religion the name of Placid. He was sent to the mission in Cambridge and acted as chaplain to Joshua Basset, appointed master of Sidney Sussex College by a royal mandate dated 3 January 1687.

On 7 February 1686–7 James II addressed a mandatory letter under his signet manual to John Peachell, vice-chancellor of Cambridge University, commanding him to admit Francis to the degree as master of arts "without administering unto him any oath or oaths whatsoever, or tendering any subscription to be made by him", thus ignoring the Test Act 1673. This letter was laid before a congregation of the university on 21 February, and the senate advised that the king should be petitioned to revoke his mandate. The esquire-bedels and the registrars were sent to inform Francis that the senate were ready to admit him to the degree provided that he would swear as the law appointed, but he refused to do so, insisting upon the royal dispensation. On the same afternoon the heads met in the consistory, and agreed to send a letter to the Duke of Albemarle and another to the Earl of Sunderland, secretary of state, through whose hands the mandate had passed. A second letter from the king dated 24 February was read in the senate on 11 March. The senate, confirmed by the approval of several eminent lawyers, persisted in its refusal to comply with the royal letters. Consequently, the vice-chancellor and the senate (by its deputies) were cited to appear before the Ecclesiastical Commission at Whitehall. The lord chancellor (Jeffreys) pronounced the decision of the commissioners on 7 May 1687. Peachell was deprived of the office of vice-chancellor and was suspended, ab officio et beneficio, of his mastership during his majesty's pleasure. At a subsequent sitting (12 May) the lord chancellor reprimanded the deputies of the senate. Another vice-chancellor was elected, John Balderston, master of Emmanuel College, but Francis never got his degree.

At the Glorious Revolution, Francis withdrew to Lamspringe, whence he removed in 1699 to the English Benedictine college of St Gregory at Douai. He was again sent to the mission in the south province of England, where he died on 27 July 1715.
