= Thomas Nevile =

English clergyman and academic

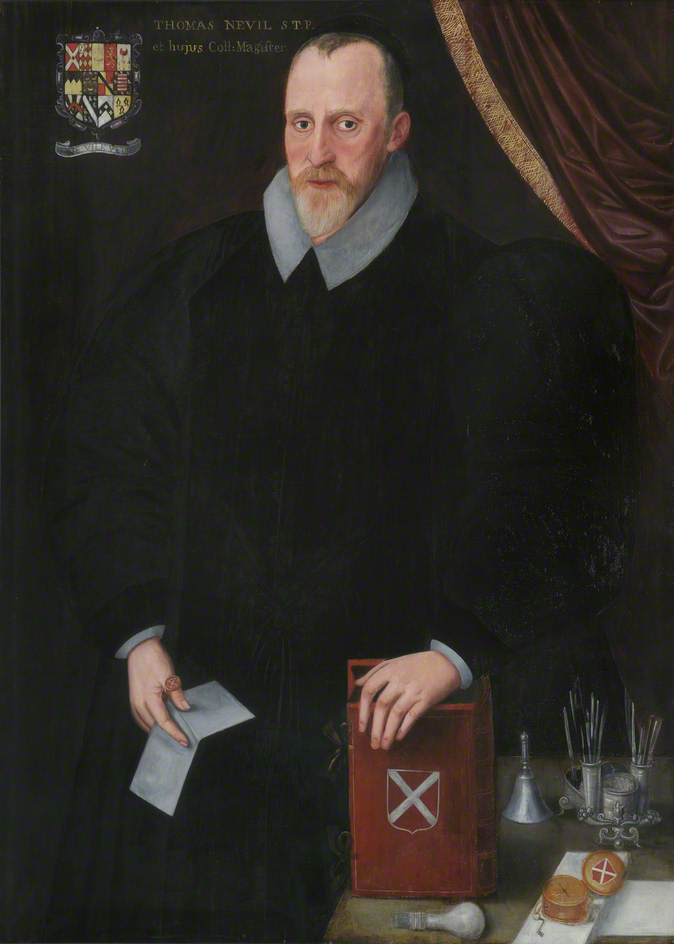
Thomas Nevile

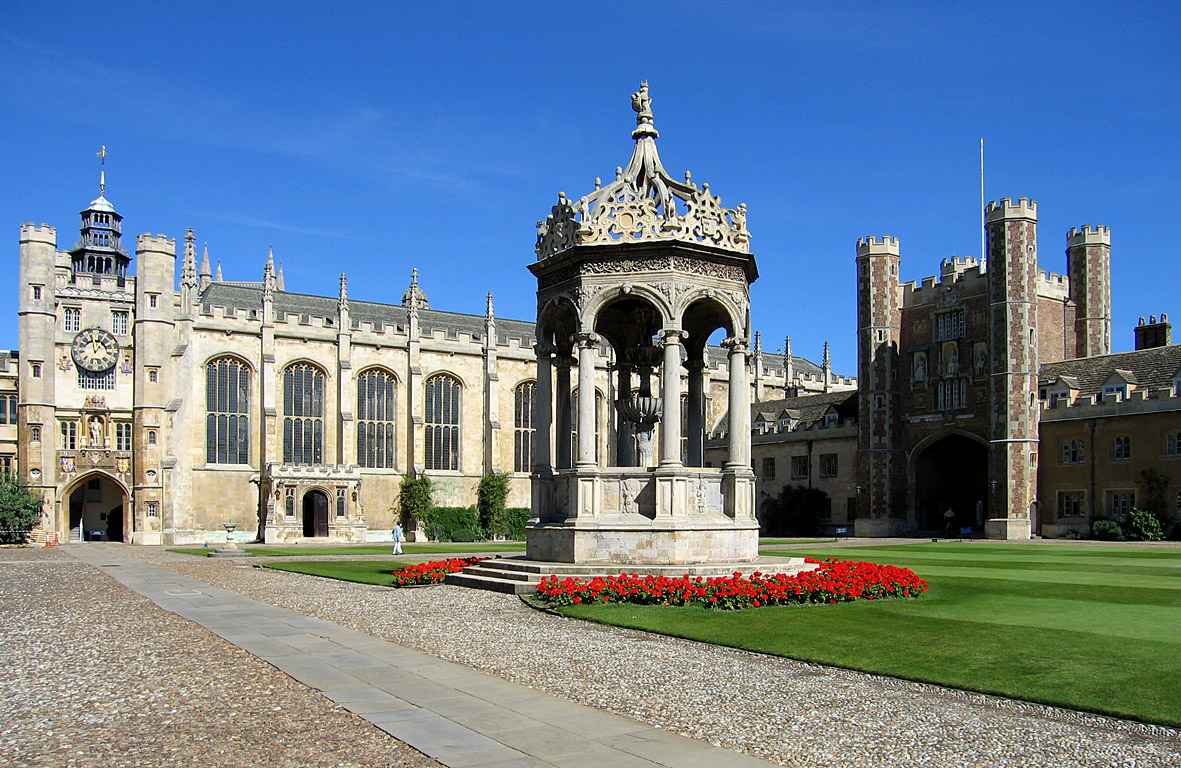
Trinity Great Court as remodelled by Nevile

Arms of Neville: Gules, a saltire argent

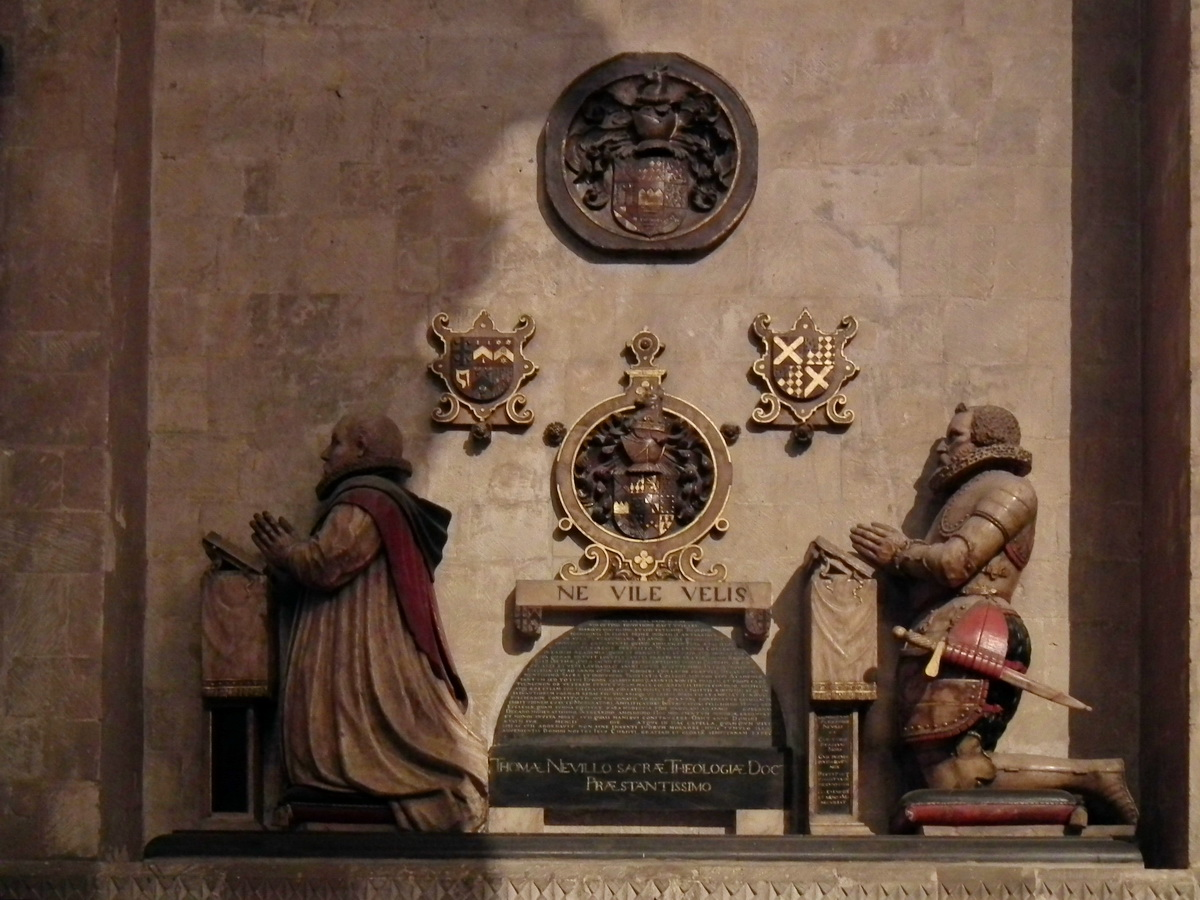
Monument with kneeling effigies of Thomas Nevile and his brother Alexander Nevile, in Canterbury Cathedral

Thomas Nevile (c. 1548 – 2 May 1615) was an English clergyman and academic who was Dean of Peterborough (1591–1597) and Dean of Canterbury (1597–1615), Master of Magdalene College, Cambridge (1582–1593), and Master of Trinity College, Cambridge (1593–1615).

== Origins ==
He was born in Canterbury, a son of Richard Neville of South Leverton, Nottinghamshire (who moved to Canterbury in his retirement), a son of Alexander Neville, Escheator of Nottinghamshire and Derbyshire in 1519–20. His mother was Anne Mantell, a daughter of Sir Walter Mantell of Nether Heyford, Northamptonshire. His brother was the scholar Alexander Neville (1544–1614). He bore the same arms as the prominent and ancient Neville family, Earls of Westmorland. The origins of the Neville family of South Leverton are unclear, but an early ancestor was Thomas Neville, Recorder of Nottingham and Member of Parliament for Nottingham in 1472.

== Career ==
Nevile matriculated at Pembroke College, Cambridge in 1564/5, becoming a Fellow in 1570. During a long and distinguished career he held a succession of prestigious ecclesiastical posts including the Deanery of both Peterborough and Canterbury, that allowed him to build substantial personal wealth. Within Cambridge, his popularity in the Court of Queen Elizabeth meant he found similar success there, both as Master of Magdalene College and as Vice Chancellor of the university in 1588. Then, in February 1593 Elizabeth appointed him to succeed John Still to the Mastership of Trinity, and it is for his mastership of Trinity that he is now best remembered.

The college he inherited was little more than the architectural remains of the colleges that had united to form Trinity, and he set about using both his personal wealth and influence to create a setting unrivalled in academic England. To quote Trevelyan, "If Henry VIII founded Trinity, Nevile built it".

Over the next decade he razed a number of existing buildings to clear the space for the area now known as Great Court. This included moving Great Gate, the entrance gate to the college, 20 metres east brick by brick, and resulted in one of the largest enclosed courts in Europe.

In his final years he built an additional court, Nevile's Court, paid for entirely by himself.

A monument showing two kneeling effigies representing Thomas and his brother Alexander survives in Canterbury Cathedral.

Academic offices
Preceded by Degory Nicholls	Master of Magdalene College, Cambridge; 1582–1593	Succeeded by Richard Clayton
Preceded by John Still	Master of Trinity College, Cambridge; 1593–1615	Succeeded by John Richardson
Church of England titles
Preceded by Richard Fletcher	Dean of Peterborough; 1590–1597	Succeeded by John Palmer
Preceded by Richard Rogers	Dean of Canterbury; 1597–1615	Succeeded by Charles Fotherby
