= Daniel Waterland =

English theologian

Daniel Waterland (14 Feb 1683 – 23 December 1740) was an English theologian. He became Master of Magdalene College, Cambridge in 1714, Chancellor of the Diocese of York in 1722, and Archdeacon of Middlesex in 1730.

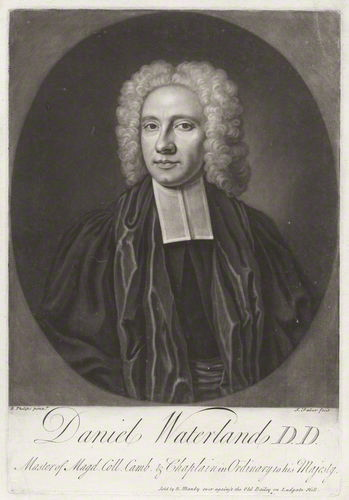
Daniel Waterland, engraving by John Faber the Younger after Richard Phillips.

Waterland opposed the latitudinarians of his time. He was an acute controversialist on behalf of the orthodox doctrine of the Trinity, on which he wrote several treatises. He was also the author of a History of the Athanasian Creed (1724).

== Early life ==
The second son of Henry Waterland, rector of Walesby and Flixborough, Lincolnshire, by his second wife, he was born at Walesby on 14 Feb 1683. He was educated at the Lincoln Grammar School. At Magdalene College, Cambridge, he was admitted on 30 March 1699 and elected scholar on 26 December 1702; and became a fellow on 13 February 1703–4. He graduated B.A. in 1703 and B.D. in 1714, and proceeded M.A. in 1706 and D.D. in 1717. On 8 May 1724 he was incorporated at Oxford.

== Cambridge academic ==
Waterland was conscientious, and devoted to tutorial work and university business. He was examiner in arts in 1710 and in the philosophical schools in 1711. In February 1713 he was appointed by the visitor, Lord Suffolk and Bindon, to the mastership of his college, vacant by the death of Gabriel Quadring, and presented to the rectory of Ellingham, Norfolk. At the public commencement in 1714 he held a disputation with Thomas Sherlock on the question of Arian subscription. On 14 November 1715 he succeeded Sherlock as vice-chancellor of the university. In 1716 he preached the sermon on occasion of the university's public thanksgiving (7 June) for the suppression of the Jacobite Rising of 1715, and on 22 October presented to the Prince of Wales at Hampton Court an address of congratulation.

In 1717 Waterland was appointed chaplain in ordinary to the king. His controversial works marked him out as a successor to George Bull, and he became the first lecturer on Lady Moyer's endowment. He joined in the censure passed by the Cambridge heads of houses in January 1721 on Richard Bentley's libel on John Colbatch.

== Preferment ==
In 1721 Waterland was presented by the dean and chapter of St Paul's Cathedral to the London rectory of St. Austin and St. Faith. On 21 December 1722 he was appointed by Archbishop William Dawes as chancellor of the diocese of York. He took an active part in the final stage of the struggle with Bentley, being a member of the syndicate appointed on 26 September 1723 to take steps to defeat or delay his restoration to office.

A Windsor canonry was added to Waterland's preferments on 27 September 1727, and in 1730 the archdeaconry of Middlesex (13 August) and the vicarage of Twickenham (October); and he resigned his London rectory.

== Later life and death ==
Waterland declined in 1734 the office of prolocutor to the lower house of Convocation, and also at a later date (December 1738 or May 1740) the see of Llandaff. He died without issue on 23 December 1740. His remains were interred in the south transept of St George's Chapel, Windsor. In 1719 he had married Theodosia (d. 8 December 1761), daughter of John Tregonwell of Anderton, Dorset.

== Works ==
The unauthorised publication of a correspondence which had passed between him and John Jackson on the Arian tendency of Samuel Clarke's Scripture Doctrine of the Trinity drew from Waterland A Vindication of Christ's Divinity, Cambridge, 1719, in which he attacked not only Clarke, but Daniel Whitby. Whitby replied, and Waterland published an Answer to his reply, Cambridge, 1720. The Eight Sermons in Defence of the Divinity of our Lord Jesus Christ, his Moyer Lectures in St Paul's Cathedral, published at Cambridge in 1720, were reprinted at Oxford in 1815.

In 1723 appeared his Critical History of the Athanasian Creed (Cambridge), in which, with a thorough review of the then accessible evidence, he assigned the creed to the decade 430–40, and its composition to Hilary of Arles. A second edition was issued in 1728. Reprints appeared at London in 1850, and at Oxford, edited by John Richard King, in 1870; Waterland's argument was discussed by Joseph Rawson Lumby, History of the Creeds, 3rd ed. 1887.

He engaged in the deistical controversy with Scripture Vindicated (Cambridge, 1730–2, 3 pts.), a reply to Matthew Tindal's Christianity as Old as the Creation. To Edmund Law's Enquiry into the Ideas of Space, Time, Immensity, and Eternity (1734), Waterland contributed an appendix A Dissertation upon the Argument a priori for proving the Existence of a First Cause, in which, with reference to Clarke, he tried to dispose of the ontological argument in the supposed interests of orthodoxy. The Importance of the Doctrine of the Holy Trinity Asserted, London, 1734; 3rd ed. Cambridge, 1800; and Review of the Doctrine of the Eucharist as laid down in Scripture and Antiquity, Cambridge, 1737, were other major works. A reprint of the latter appeared at Oxford in 1868; new ed. 1896. Waterland's Discourse of Fundamentals (1735) is often regarded as an important contribution to Protestant thought on the doctrine of fundamental articles.

Waterland's other works, besides sermons and charges, included:

- The Case of Arian Subscription Considered, Cambridge, 1721;
- A Supplement to the Case of Arian Subscription Considered, London, 1722; reply to Arthur Ashley Sykes.
- The Scriptures and the Arians compared in their accounts of God the Father and God the Son, London, 1722.
- A Second Vindication of Christ's Divinity, London, 1723.
- A Further Vindication of Christ's Divinity, London, 1724.
- Remarks upon Dr. Clarke's Exposition of the Church Catechism, London, 1730; to Sykes and Thomas Emlyn.
- The Nature, Obligation, and Efficacy of the Christian Sacraments Considered, London, 1730; and its 'Supplement' published the same year.
- Advice to a Young Student, London, 1730; 3rd ed. Cambridge, 1760; London, 1761.
- Regeneration Stated and Explained, London, 1740, 1780.
- A Summary View of the Doctrine of Justification.
- An Inquiry concerning the Antiquity of the Practice of Infant Communion.

These two last tracts first appeared posthumously with Waterland's Sermons, ed. Joseph Clarke, London, 1742, 2 vols.; 2nd ed. 1776.

A collected edition of Waterland's works, with a review of his life and writings by William Van Mildert, appeared at Oxford in 1823, 10 vols. The last volume is mainly letters; there are also Fourteen Letters to Zachary Pearce, ed. Edward Churton, Oxford, 1868, and Five Letters to William Staunton, appended to the latter's Reason and Revelation Stated, London, 1722. Four letters to John Anstis the elder are in Stowe MS. 749, ff. 273–49.

== Modern Treatment ==
The Rt. Rev. Ray R. Sutton of Dallas, Texas completed a doctoral thesis under Dr. Alister McGrath entitled The Sacramental Theology of Daniel Waterland, completed in 1998 and awarded by Coventry University. Waterland is covered extensively in the book Reformation Without End: Religion, Politics and the Past in Post-revolutionary England' by Robert G. Ingram (Manchester University Press, 2018). For his thought on "fundamental articles", see chapter six of Stephen Pickard's doctoral thesis at Durham, and the first major study in the Cambridge University doctoral thesis of Simeon Williams.

== Notes ==
Academic offices
Preceded by Gabriel Quadring	Master of Magdalene College, Cambridge; 1713–1740	Succeeded by Edward Abbott
