= Edward Rainbowe =

English academic, clergyman and preacher

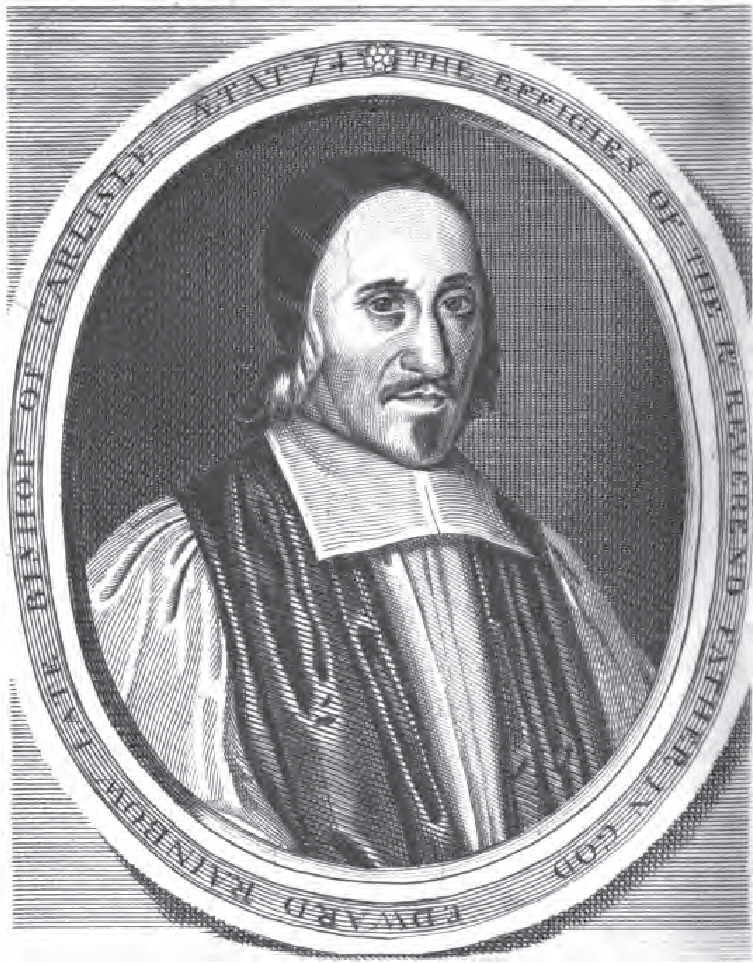
Bishop Rainbowe

Edward Rainbowe or Rainbow (1608–1684) was an English academic, Church of England clergyman and a noted preacher. He was Master of Magdalene College, Cambridge, Vice-Chancellor of the University of Cambridge and Bishop of Carlisle.

== Life ==
He was born on 20 April 1608 at Blyton in Lindsey, Lincolnshire, where his father Thomas Rainbowe was vicar. His mother, Rebecca, daughter of David Allen, rector of the neighbouring parish of Ludborough, was educated in Latin, Greek, and Hebrew. Edward's godfather, Edward Wray of Rycote, was second son of Sir Edward Wray of Glentworth in Lincolnshire. The Wrays possessed influence, and the connection proved important to the young Rainbowe.

After spending a short time at Queen Elizabeth's Grammar School in Gainsborough, he was sent in April 1620 to Peterborough, to be under John Williams, then one of the prebendaries, and an old friend of his father. When, in the following year, Williams was preferred to the deanery of Westminster and bishopric of Lincoln, Rainbowe moved to Westminster School. From Westminster he proceeded in July 1623 to Corpus Christi College, Oxford, as scholar, but in 1625 he received from Frances, dowager countess of Warwick, a nomination to one of the scholarships founded at Magdalene College, Cambridge, by her father, Sir Christopher Wray. He graduated B.A. in 1627, M.A. in 1630, B.D. in 1637, and D.D. in 1643. He was elected a fellow of Magdalene in 1633 and Master in 1642. While a student he was suddenly called on by the vice-chancellor to act as terræ filius in place of one who was deprived of the office on account of his scurrility; Rainbowe was facetious but acquitted himself to the satisfaction of his auditors.

In July 1630 he accepted the mastership of a school at Kirton-in-Lindsey, but soon moved with some Cambridge contemporaries to London, settling first in Fuller's Rents, and afterwards at Sion College, so as to make use of the library. He took holy orders, and preached his first sermon in April 1632. After making an unsuccessful application for the chaplaincy to the society of Lincoln's Inn, he was appointed curate at the Savoy Hospital.

In November 1633 he was recalled to Cambridge. The master and fellows of Magdalene College elected him to a bye-fellowship on the foundation of Barnabas Gooch, with a promise of the first open founder's fellowship that should fall vacant. He became a successful tutor, numbering among his pupils two sons of the Earl of Suffolk, with whom he became intimate, and two of Francis Leke, Baron Deincourt. The noble families of Northumberland, Warwick, and Orrery also showed him favour. In 1637 he accepted the small living of Childerley, near Cambridge; in 1637 he became dean of Magdalene; and in 1642 Master, by the gift of the Earl of Suffolk. From the mastership he was dismissed, by order of parliament, in 1650. In 1652 he accepted from the Earl of Suffolk the small living of Little Chesterford in Essex. He became rector of Benefield in Northamptonshire in 1658, by the presentation of the Earl of Warwick, after the Earl of Orrery had obtained for him induction without the intervention of the ‘Tryers.’

On the Restoration in 1660, Rainbowe was restored to his mastership at Cambridge, and appointed chaplain to the king. In the following year he was made Dean of Peterborough, and moved there; but he returned to Cambridge on being appointed vice-chancellor in November 1662. In 1664 he was elected bishop of Carlisle, on the translation of Richard Sterne to York. Rainbowe was consecrated in July 1664, in London, by Gilbert Sheldon, Archbishop of Canterbury, and in September in the same year he arrived at his palace of Rose Castle, near Dalston, in Cumberland. He had to borrow money to pay for the charges of his consecration, first-fruits, and his journey and settlement in his diocese; and the ruined state of his palace involved him in building, and in litigation about dilapidations with his predecessor and metropolitan, Sterne. Rainbowe found his diocese required reform. Negligent clergy publicly affronted their bishop, and his outspoken denunciation of immorality appears to have offended some great lady about the court. In years of scarcity, when his own stores were exhausted, he bought barley and distributed it to the poor. To the poor at Carlisle and Dalston he made regular allowances. He paid for the education of poor boys at Dalston Grammar School, and for putting them out as apprentices; he supported poor scholars at the universities; he subscribed largely to the French Protestants and to foreign converts. Dalston Grammar School was given an endowment by Rainbowe; the original endowment was looted during the English Civil War.

Rainbowe died on 26 March 1684, and was buried, by his own request, at Dalston (1 April), under a plain stone, with a simple inscription. His wife Elizabeth, daughter of Henry Smyth (his predecessor as master of Magdalene), whom he married in 1652, survived him. After his death she resided chiefly at Dalemain with her sister's son, Sir Edward Hasell. She died in 1702, and was also buried in Dalston churchyard.

== Works ==
Rainbowe was famous as a preacher. In later life he abandoned the ornate rhetoric of his early days for plainness. Three of his sermons were printed; the first of these, "Labour forbidden and commanded" (London, 1635, 4to), was preached at St Paul's Cross on 23 September 1634. Rainbowe planned a treatise, to be called Verba Christi, a collection of Christ's discourses and sayings, but it was never completed. With his life, by Jonathan Banks (anon. 1688), appear some meditations by him, and one or two short poems, as well as the sermon preached at his funeral by his chancellor, Thomas Tully.

== Notes ==
=== Attribution ===
This article incorporates text from a publication now in the public domain: "Rainbowe, Edward". Dictionary of National Biography. London: Smith, Elder & Co. 1885–1900.

Academic offices
Preceded by Henry Smyth	Master of Magdalene College, Cambridge; 1642–1650	Succeeded by John Sadler
Preceded by John Sadler	Master of Magdalene College, Cambridge; 1660–1664	Succeeded by John Howorth
Church of England titles
Preceded by Richard Sterne	Bishop of Carlisle; 1664–1684	Succeeded by Thomas Smith
