= William Dudgeon (philosopher) =

Scottish philosopher

William Dudgeon (1705/6–1743) was a Scottish freethinker and philosopher. A tenant farmer who resided at Lennel Hill Farm, near Coldstream, Berwickshire, he was one of several philosophers active in the borders area of Scotland during this period. Other figures in this group include Andrew Baxter (metaphysician), Henry Home (Lord Kames), and most importantly David Hume.

Dudgeon's first work was 'The Necessity of some of the Positive Institutes of Ch__ty Considered' (1731). This work was a defence of Matthew Tindal's doctrines in 'Christianity as Old as Creation' (1730), which had been criticized by Robert Wallace (minister). Dudgeon's next and most controversial work was 'The State of the Moral World Considered' (1732). In this work he defended a metaphysical optimism that is similar to that of Anthony Ashley-Cooper, 3rd Earl of Shaftesbury, as well as a necessitarian doctrine not unlike that of Anthony Collins. This work drew a hostile reply from Andrew Baxter, who was Scotland's most prominent defender of the philosophy of Samuel Clarke. Baxter accused Dudgeon of both ‘atheism’ and ‘scepticism’. These charges encouraged the local clergy in the presbytery of Chirnside to prosecute Dudgeon on the ground that he was the author of a work that ‘contains many gross errors subversive of Christianity’. One of the clerics involved was an uncle of David Hume (who was also living in Chirnside at this time with his family).

Among Dudgeon's other major works is 'Philosophical Letters' (1737), written to John Jackson (controversialist), another prominent defender of Clarke's philosophy. In this work Dudgeon criticized Clarke's Newtonian metaphysics and morals. By way of alternative he defended a form of pantheistic immaterialism that blended the views of George Berkeley and Spinoza, along with a moral sense ethics in line with Shaftesbury. This work was favourably reviewed in the journal 'History of the Works of the Learned' (1737/8), where Dudgeon's ‘Spinozism’ was noted.

In another controversy Dudgeon tangled with William Warburton on the subject of Pope's 'Essay on Man'. Warburton, a friend of Baxter's (and later a celebrated enemy of Hume's), referred to Dudgeon as belonging to ‘the tribe of Free-thinkers’ and placed him in the same company as John Toland, Matthew Tindal, and Anthony Collins (Warburton, preface to 'A Commentary on Mr. Pope's Essay on Man'). Some years later John Witherspoon, in his satirical work 'Ecclesiastical Characteristics' (maxim 4), mentioned Dudgeon along with a number of thinkers, including Shaftesbury, Gottfried Wilhelm Leibniz, Collins, and Kames, whose ideas had been influential on the ‘moderate’ party in the Church of Scotland. These controversies and references suggest that Dudgeon's philosophy enjoyed some influence on both sides of the border.

There is no evidence that Dudgeon and Hume had any direct contact. Nevertheless, given their close proximity when Hume was young and philosophically active, and the role of Hume's uncle in Dudgeon's prosecution, it is reasonable to assume that Hume knew of Dudgeon's philosophical work and the associated controversies involving Baxter and Warburton. Suffice it to note that Dudgeon and Hume shared philosophical interests and that on a number of significant issues they took up similar positions.

Dudgeon, a resolute defender of the thesis that all is for the best, died of consumption, aged thirty-seven, on 28 January 1743 at Upsettlington, Berwickshire. His most important works were gathered into a single volume, which was published without a printer's name attached in 1765.

== Works ==
- The Necessity of some of the Positive Institutions of Ch__ty Considered, 1731.
- The State of the Moral World considered; or a Vindication of Providence in the Government of the Moral World, 1732. An attempt to solve the problem of the existence of evil.
- Philosophical Letters concerning the Being and Attributes of God, 1737. These were addressed to John Jackson, a follower of Samuel Clarke. Dudgeon argued that Clarke's principles involve the conclusion that God is the only substance.
- A Catechism founded upon Experience and Reason. Collected by a Father for the use of his Children, with an Introductory Letter to a Friend concerning Natural Religion, 1744. Natural religion is treated as the common element in all religious systems, which alone is true.

A collected edition appeared, under the title of The Philosophical Works of Mr. William Dudgeon, in 1765. [Reprinted by Routledge/Thoemmes Press, 1994.]

- Andrew Baxter, 'Some reflections on a late pamphlet called, ‘The state of the moral world considered’' (1732).
- 'History of the Works of the Learned', April 1737, art. 26 [a review of Dudgeon-Jackson Correspondence].
- 'Bibliothèque Raisonnée' (April/May/June 1737) [a review of Dudgeon-Jackson Correspondence].

== References and Secondary Sources ==
- James McCosh, The Scottish philosophy, biographical, expository, critical, from Hutcheson to Hamilton (New York, 1875) ·
- Paul Russell, ‘Dudgeon, William’, The dictionary of eighteenth-century British philosophers, ed. J. W. Yolton, J. V. Price, and J. Stephens (1999).
- Paul Russell, 'The Riddle of Hume's Treatise: Skepticism, Naturalism and Irreligion' (Oxford University Press: 2008).
- [Paul Russell], "William Dudgeon”, 'New Dictionary of National Biography'. (Oxford University Press: 2004): https://doi.org/10.1093/ref:odnb/8140

Attribution
