= Edward Clarke (MP for Norwich) =

English politician

Edward Clarke (c. 1636 – 1723) was an English politician. Christened on the 5 February 1636–7 at East Raynham, he was the son of Rev. Samuel Clarke (d. 1692) rector of Raynham, Norfolk and Katherine Symonds (d. 1686) of Stody, Norfolk. He was a member of the Norfolk gentry and a descendant of Member of Parliament and English courtier, Sir Anthony Lee by his first wife, Margaret Wyatt.

== Biography ==
A Whig Alderman and a worsted weaver, Clarke was elected mayor in 1700 and MP for Norwich in 1701 but defeated in the August 1702 and in the November 1703 elections.

Clarke was buried in St Andrew's parish in Norwich on 17 November 1723, his will was proved on 24 January 1724.

He was the father of theologian and philosopher, Samuel Clarke to whom he left some properties in Briston, Norfolk. Clarke's other children were John Clarke, Mary Gough and Elizabeth Skipper.

=== Family background ===
Edward Clarke was a remote relative of Nathaniel Symonds (c. 1648 – 1720), MP for Great Yarmouth in 1709–10.

Some William Clarke of South Raynham, Norfolk whose will was proved sometime in 1670 mentioned clergyman Samuel Clarke, it is unknown if the two men shared some degree of blood relation.
