= Richard Clayton (dean of Peterborough) =

English churchman

Richard Clayton (died 1612) was an English churchman and academic, Master of Magdalene College, Cambridge and St John's College, Cambridge and Dean of Peterborough.

== Life ==
He was son of John Clayton of Crook, Preston, Lancashire, and was admitted a pensioner of St. John's College, Cambridge, in 1572, but moved to Oxford, where he proceeded B.A., and was incorporated in that degree at Cambridge in 1576. In the following year he was admitted a fellow of St. John's, on the Lady Margaret's foundation. He commenced M.A. at Cambridge in 1579, and was incorporated in that degree at Oxford on 12 July 1580. He proceeded B.D. at Cambridge in 1587, was elected a college preacher at St. John's the same year, and was created D.D. in 1592.

He became Master of Magdalene College, Cambridge, in 1593, was installed Archdeacon of Lincoln on 30 August 1595, and was collated to the prebend of Thorngate in the church of Lincoln on 11 December 1595. He was admitted Master of St. John's College, Cambridge, on 22 December 1595, in what as a highly politicised election manipulated by Lord Burghley: the Fellows had a shortlist including Henry Alvey, Clayton, John Ireton, John Knewstub, Roger Morrell, John Rainolds, and a Dr. Webster, but Burghley insisted on one of Clayton and Laurence Stanton (who was the choice of the heads of houses). The second court of the college was his major work as Master at St. John's; he was intolerant of Puritanism in the college.

He was collated to a canonry of Peterborough on 21 June 1596, was vice-chancellor of the university of Cambridge in 1604; and was installed dean of Peterborough on 28 July 1607. He died on 2 May 1612, and was buried in St. John's College chapel.

== Notes ==
Academic offices
Preceded by Thomas Neville	Master of Magdalene College, Cambridge; 1593–1595	Succeeded by John Palmer
Preceded by William Whitaker	Master of St John's College, Cambridge; 1595–1612	Succeeded by Owen Gwyn
Church of England titles
Preceded by John Palmer	Dean of Peterborough; 1607–1612	Succeeded by George Meriton
