= John Peachell =

English academic

John Peachell (1630–1690) was an English academic, Master of Magdalene College, Cambridge, and Vice-Chancellor of the University of Cambridge at the moment when James II was aiming to impose his will on the universities.

== Life ==
He was son of Robert Peachell or Pechell of Fillingham, Lincolnshire, was educated at Gainsborough school, and was admitted as a sizar of Magdalene on 1 August 1645. His subsequent degrees were B.A. 1649, M.A. 1653, S.T.B. 1661, S.T.P. 1680. He was elected fellow on Smith's foundation in 1649, on Spendluffe's in 1651, and a foundation fellow in 1656. His views were royalist. In 1661 Samuel Pepys spent an evening with him at the Rose tavern in Cambridge; but he says objected to be seen walking with Peachell on account of his drinker’s nose.

In 1663 he was presented by Sir John Cutts to the rectory of Childerley, Cambridgeshire, which he resigned on obtaining the rectory of Dry Drayton in 1681. He was also presented to the vicarage of Stanwix in Cumberland. In 1679, moreover, Peachell became master of his college, and in 1686 vice-chancellor of the university.

In the course of 1686 James II discovered that John Lightfoot had not taken the oaths required under the Test Act when he was admitted to his master's degree at Cambridge, and he furnished with royal letters patent a Roman Catholic candidate for the degree, the Benedictine monk Alban Francis. On 7 February 1687 a royal letter was sent to Cambridge enjoining the admission of Francis, and on 21 February this letter was laid before congregation. It was there decided that Francis should be admitted only on condition that he took the oaths. He, however, refused to be sworn. Peachell wrote to the Duke of Albemarle, who was then chancellor of the university, and also to the Earl of Sunderland, to beg their intercession with the king. Albemarle replied to that he had done his best but had only succeeded in provoking the displeasure of the king.

On 9 April a summons was sent down citing the vice-chancellor and deputies of the senate (among them Isaac Newton) to appear before the Ecclesiastical Commission. When he appeared in the council-chamber on 21 April, Peachell was bullied by George Jeffreys, who sat at the head of the board. He got leave to prepare an answer in writing, and for the examination to be postponed for a week. He gave in his answer in writing on 27 April, and was summoned again on 7 May. Jeffreys began by asking what was the oath he had taken as vice-chancellor. Peachell evaded and stammered, and was deprived both of his mastership and of the vice-chancellorship, and the deputation was dismissed by Jeffreys.

Peachell returned to Cambridge, and he was restored to his headship by James on 24 October 1688. In the vice-chancellorship he was replaced by John Balderston, a more resolute champion of the rights of the university. Peachell did not long survive as Master; during a visit to Cambridge in 1690 the Archbishop of Canterbury William Sancroft rebuked him for drunkenness and ill-conduct. Peachell, says Gilbert Burnet, did penance by four days' abstinence, after which he wanted to eat, but could not. He was buried in the Magdalene College chapel on 5 February 1690.

== Notes ==
Academic offices
| Preceded by James Duport | Master of Magdalene College, Cambridge; 1679–1690 | Succeeded by Gabriel Quadring |
