= George Sandby =

18th-century English priest and academic

George Sandby, D.D. (5 April 1716 – 24 March 1807) was an 18th-century English priest and academic.

Sandby was educated at Merton College, Oxford, matriculating in 1734 and graduating B.A. in 1737. He held livings at Denton and Skeyton. He was Master of Magdalene College, Cambridge from 1760 until 1774; Vice-Chancellor of the University of Cambridge from 1760 until 1761; and Chancellor of the Diocese of Norwich from 1768 until his death.

Academic offices
Preceded by Thomas Chapman	Master of Magdalene College, Cambridge; 1760–1774	Succeeded by Barton Wallop
Preceded by James Burrough	Vice-Chancellor of the University of Cambridge; 1760–1761	Succeeded by Robert Plumptre
