= Samuel Colliber =

English writer

Samuel Colliber (fl. 1718–1737) was an English writer, a lay author on theological and naval matters. John Knox Laughton suggested he was a Royal Navy volunteer or schoolmaster.

== Works ==
Colliber published in 1727 Columna Rostrata, a naval history with significant coverage of the Anglo-Dutch wars of the 17th century. It took account of Dutch and French sources. A second edition was published in 1742.

Colliber wrote also a number of religious tracts, including:

- An Impartial Enquiry into the Existence and Nature of God (1718, 230 pp.), citing Pierre Poiret and Hermann Alexander Roëll among other Cartesian thinkers, and which ran through several editions;
- The Christian Religion Founded on Reason (1729);
- Free Thoughts concerning Souls (1734), citing Spinoza; and
- The Known God, or the Author of Nature unveiled (1737).

Colliber took up the ideas of Samuel Clarke on the existence of God, and his modifications influenced Edmund Law. Joseph Priestley cited Colliber against Cartesian plenism.
