= Richard Howland =

English churchman and academic

Richard Howland (1540–1600) was an English churchman and academic, Master of Magdalene College, Cambridge, and of St John's College, Cambridge, and bishop of Peterborough.

== Life ==
He was the son and heir of John Howland, of the city of London, and Anne Greenway, of Cley in Norfolk. He was born at Newport Pond, near Saffron Walden, Essex, and baptised 26 September 1540. He was admitted pensioner at Christ's College, Cambridge, on 18 March 1558, but he migrated to St. John's College, where he graduated B.A. in 1561. He was elected a fellow of Peterhouse on 11 November 1562 and proceeded M.A. in 1564. His subsequent degrees were B.D. 1570, D.D. 1578. He was incorporated M.A. of Oxford on 9 July 1567. In 1569 he became rector of Stathern, Leicestershire, on the presentation of the master and fellows of Peterhouse.

Initially, Howland was a follower of Thomas Cartwright, and signed the unsuccessful petition to Lord Burghley in 1571 asking that Cartwright might be allowed to return to Cambridge. He then changed his opinions, and after a sermon in a puritan vein in Great St. Mary's by John Millen or Milayn, a fellow of Christ's, in October 1573, he controverted its teaching in the same place during the afternoon. Howland gained the confidence of Burghley, then chancellor of the university, and became his chaplain. By Burghley's influence, he was appointed to the mastership of Magdalene College, then almost in a state of bankruptcy, in 1576.

When John Whitgift resigned the mastership of Trinity in June 1577, on his election to the see of Worcester, he strongly recommended Howland, a personal friend, to Burghley, as his successor. The queen, however, had already selected John Still, the master of St. John's, and it was arranged that Howland should be transferred from Magdalene to St. John's as Still's successor. He was admitted Master 20 July 1577, finding a college full of religious dissensions but with new statutes. In 1578 he served the office of vice-chancellor, in which capacity he, at the head of the university, waited on the queen on her visit to Audley End, on 27 July 1578, and presented her with a Greek Testament and a pair of gloves, making a suitable oration. In 1583 he was again vice-chancellor. The following year Whitgift, by this time archbishop, recommended his old friend for either of the vacant sees of Bath and Wells or of Chichester or, failing these, for the deanery of Peterborough; in 1584 the queen nominated him to the see of Peterborough. He was consecrated by Whitgift at Lambeth on 7 February 1585. The choice of a successor threatened to involve the college in a fierce internal struggle and it was arranged that Howland should continue to hold the mastership with his bishopric; he resigned in February 1586.

Howland pleaded the cause of his diocese against the excessive tax for furnishing light horse. As bishop he attended the funeral of Mary, Queen of Scots, in Peterborough Cathedral, in February 1587. The funeral cortege met at his palace, and after a great supper in his hall proceeded to the cathedral. On the death of Archbishop John Piers in 1594, Howland was earnestly recommended for the see of York by the lord president Henry Hastings, 3rd Earl of Huntingdon, and the council of the north; Matthew Hutton was appointed. The deprivation of Robert Cawdrey, vicar of South Luffenham, Rutland, led to a long dispute. Howland while bishop held the living of Sibson, Leicestershire, in commendam. He was rumored to have impoverished his bishopric for Burghley and was also the object of attacks of Martin Mar-Prelate.

He died unmarried at Castor, near Peterborough, on 23 June 1600. He was buried in his cathedral, without any memorial or epitaph.

== Notes ==
Academic offices
Preceded by Roger Kelke	Master of Magdalene College, Cambridge; 1576–1577	Succeeded by Degory Nicholls
Preceded by John Still	Master of St John's College, Cambridge; 1577–1587	Succeeded by William Whitaker
Church of England titles
Preceded by Edmund Scambler	Bishop of Peterborough; 1584–1600	Succeeded by Thomas Dove
