= James Duport =

English classical scholar (1606–1679)

James Duport (/duːˈpɔːrt/; 1606, Cambridge – 17 July 1679, Peterborough), in Latin books Jacobus Duportus Anglus, was an English classical scholar.

== Life ==
His father, John Duport, who was descended from an old Norman family (the Du Ports of Caen, who settled in Leicestershire during the reign of Henry IV), was master of Jesus College, Cambridge. The son was educated at Westminster School and at Trinity College, where he became fellow and subsequently vicemaster. In 1639 he was appointed Regius Professor of Greek, in 1641 Archdeacon of Stow, in 1664 Dean of Peterborough, and in 1668 Master of Magdalene College.

== Works ==
Through the English Civil War, in spite of the loss of his clerical offices and eventually of his professorship, Duport continued his lectures. He is best known by his Homeri gnomologia (1660), a collection of all the aphorisms, maxims, and remarkable opinions in the Iliad and Odyssey, illustrated by quotations from the Bible and classical literature. His other published works chiefly consist of translations (from the Bible and Prayer Book into Greek) and short original poems, collected under the title of Horae subsecivae or Stromata. They include congratulatory odes (inscribed to the king); funeral odes; carmina comitialia (tripos verses on different theses maintained in the schools, remarkable for their philosophical and metaphysical knowledge); sacred epigrams; and three books of miscellaneous poems (Sylvae). The character of Duports' work is not such as to appeal to modern scholars, but he deserves the credit of having done much to keep alive the study of classical literature in his day.

== Notes ==
Academic offices
Preceded by John Howorth	Master of Magdalene College, Cambridge; 1668–1679	Succeeded by John Peachell
