= Barton Wallop =

Master of Magdalene College, Cambridge
- In office 1774–1781
- Preceded by: George Sandby
- Succeeded by: Peter Peckard

Personal details
- Born: 5 November 1744
- Died: 1 September 1781 (aged 36)
- Spouse: Camilla Powlett Smith (m. 1771)
- Relations: John Wallop, Viscount Lymington (father)
- Children: 2
- Education: Eton College
- Alma mater: Magdalene College, Cambridge

The Hon. Barton Wallop (5 November 1744 – 1 September 1781) was Master of Magdalene College, Cambridge from 1774 until 1781.

The third son of John Wallop, Viscount Lymington, he was educated at Eton and Magdalene. He held livings in Portsmouth and Cliddesden.

In 1771, he married Camilla Powlett Smith with whom he had two children.

Academic offices
Preceded by George Sandby	Master of Magdalene College, Cambridge; 1774–1781	Succeeded by Peter Peckard
