= Nevile's Court, Trinity College, Cambridge =

Coordinates: 52°12′25″N 0°06′56″E

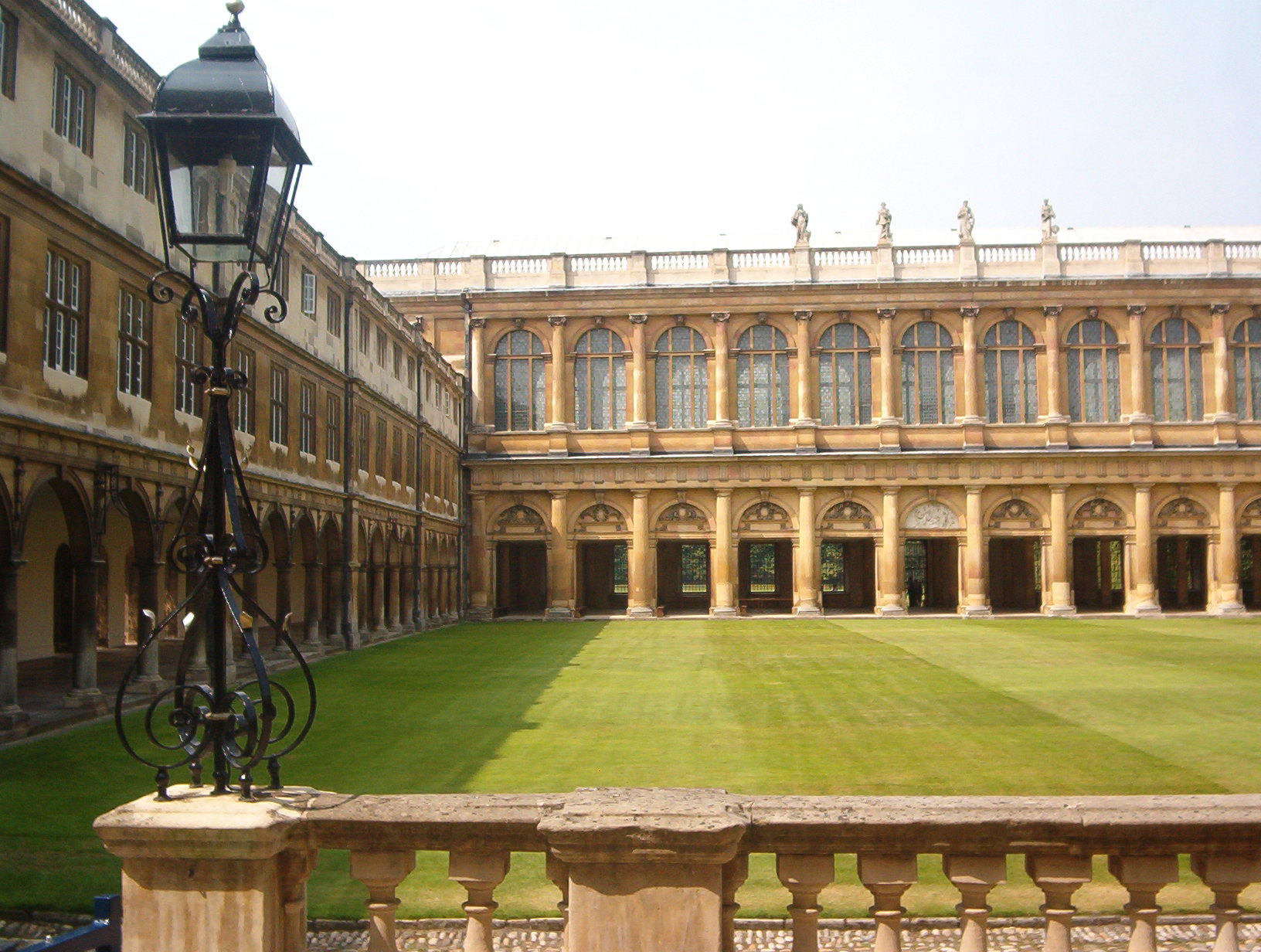
Nevile's Court towards the Wren Library

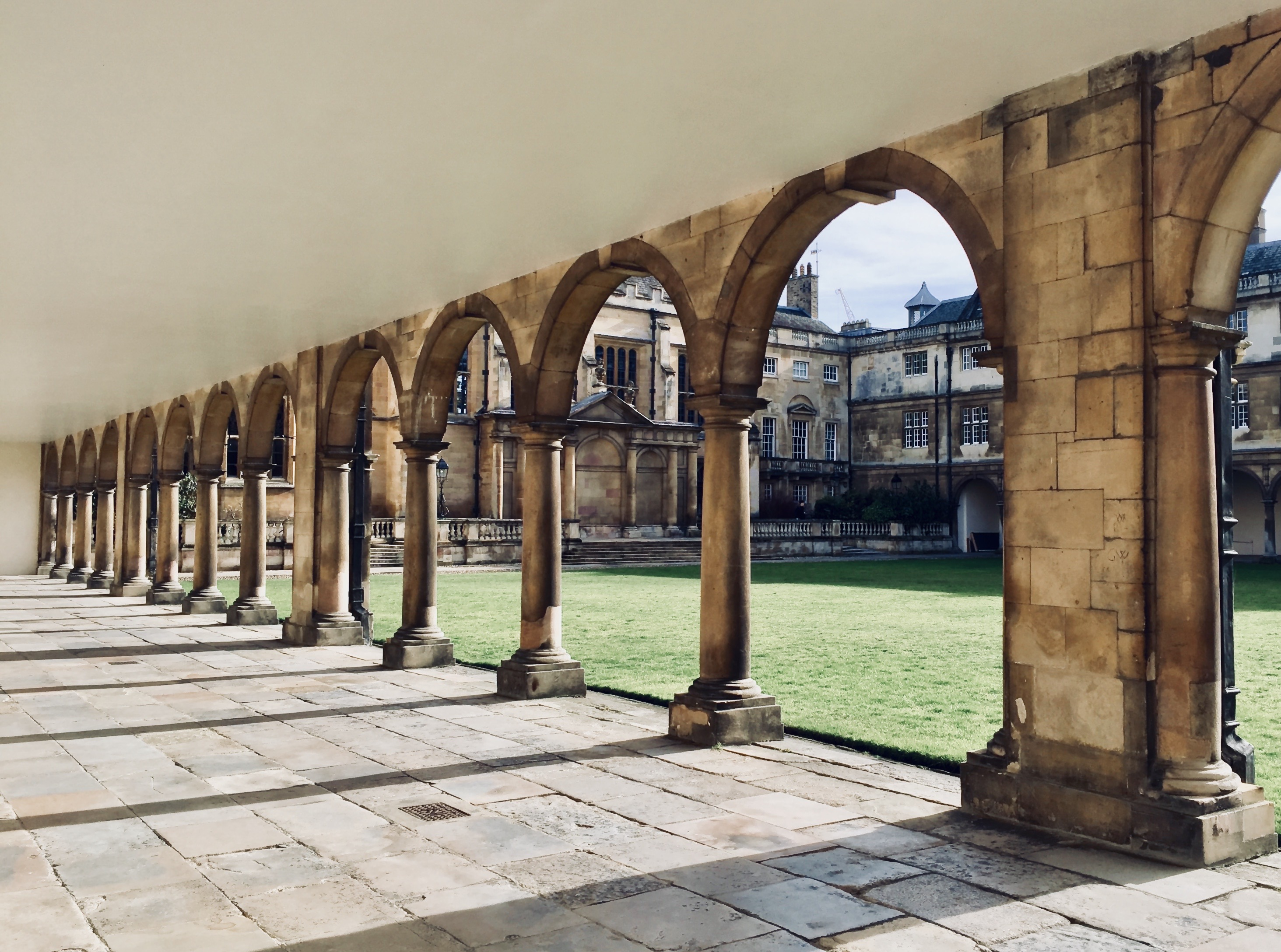
Nevile's Court colonnade

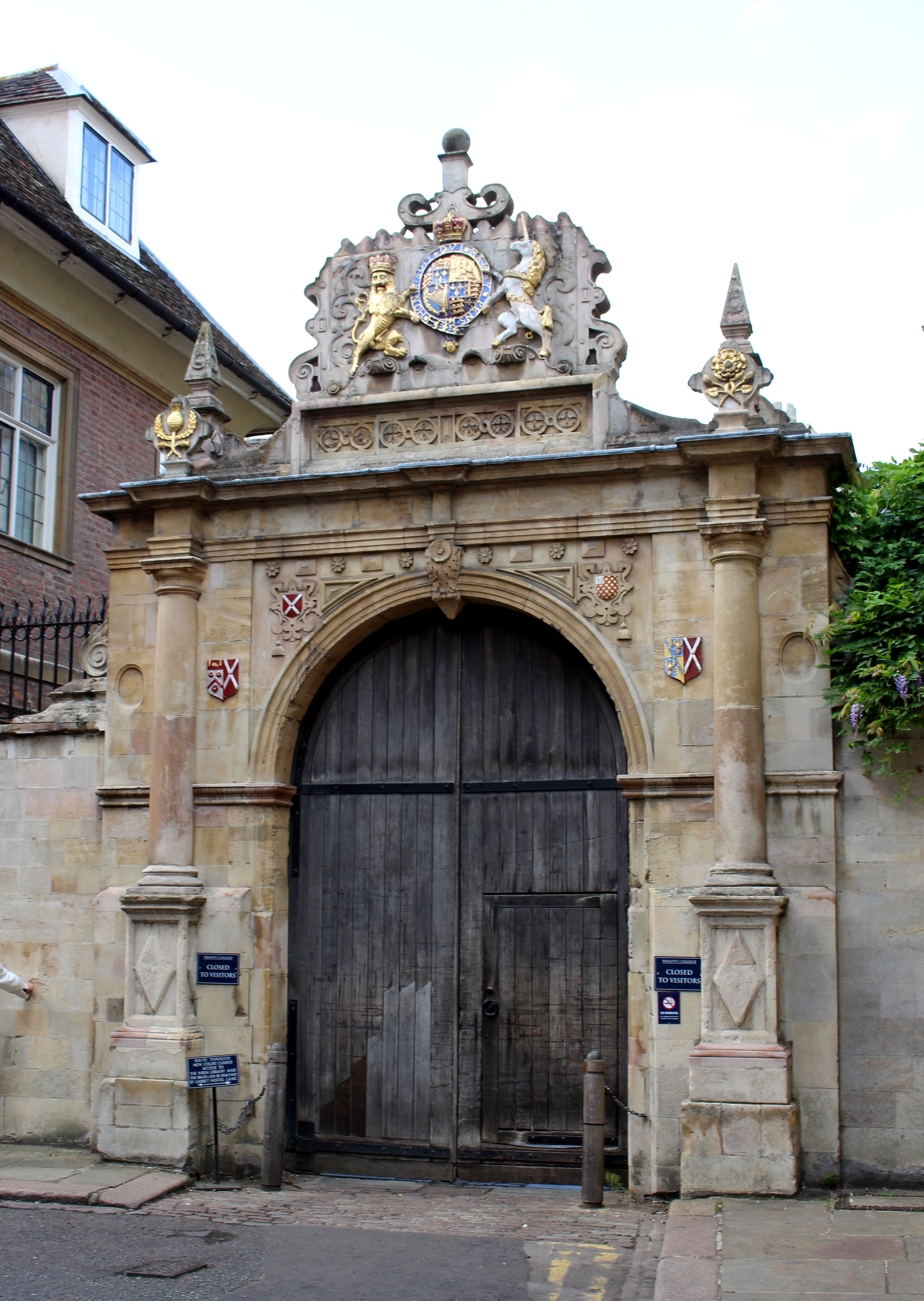
Nevile's Gate, c. 1610, showing the arms of Thomas Nevile, Trinity College and King James I

Nevile's Court is a court in Trinity College, Cambridge, England, created by a bequest by the college's master, Thomas Nevile.

The east side is dominated by the college's Hall, and the north and south sides house college rooms for fellows (and a few students) raised above the cloisters. The court is regarded as the sanctum sanctorum of the college by fellows and students on account of the difficulty of obtaining rooms there.

It was in the north cloister that Isaac Newton stamped his foot to time the echoes and determine the speed of sound for the first time.

The initial court, completed in 1612, was approximately 60% of its current length and its west side consisted of a wall in which was set a gate leading to the bank of the River Cam. (The gate, known as the Nevile Gate, now stands as an entrance to the college from Trinity Lane.)

The west side was transformed from 1673 onwards when the master, Isaac Barrow, persuaded his friend Christopher Wren to design a library for the college. The Wren Library was completed in 1695 and is a masterpiece of the classical style. At the same time, the north and south sides were extended to reach the new library. Rooms on the north side of the range were paid for by Sir Thomas Sclater, who laid out 800l for the purpose. The "Old Guest Room" on the south side of the range bears the mottos 'Vernon semper viret' and 'Le bon temps viendra' in lozenges on the ceiling.

Nevile's Court was extensively restored and remodelled in the 18th century when the gables, which are shown on the print of the College made by David Loggan, were removed.
