= Henry Smyth (Master of Magdalene College) =

Henry Smyth, D.D. was a 17th-century priest and academic.

Smyth was educated at Trinity College, Cambridge; He was Master of Magdalene College, Cambridge from 1626 until 1642; and Vice-Chancellor of the University of Cambridge from 1626 until 1627. He was a Prebendary of Lincoln from 1611 until 1629; and then of Peterborough from then until his death in 1642.

Academic offices
Preceded by Barnaby Goche	Master of Magdalene College, Cambridge; 1626–1642	Succeeded by Edward Rainbow
Preceded by John Gostlyn	Vice-Chancellor of the University of Cambridge; 1626–1627	Succeeded by Thomas Bainbridge
