= Degory Nicholls =

Degory Nicholls was a 16th-century priest and academic.

Evans was educated at both Oxford and Cambridge universities; He was Master of Magdalene College, Cambridge from 1577 until 1582. He held livings at Lanivet, St Ervan, Cheriton Fitzpaine and Lanreath; and was a Canon of Exeter from 1579 until his death in 1590.

Academic offices
Preceded by Richard Howland	Master of Magdalene College, Cambridge; 1577–1582	Succeeded by Thomas Nevile
