= Joseph Clarke (priest) =

British priest, academic and controversialist

Joseph Clarke (died 1749) was an English cleric and academic, known as a controversialist. He was particularly concerned to oppose followers of Samuel Clarke (no relation).

== Life ==
The son of Joseph Clarke, D.D., rector of Long Ditton, Surrey, he was educated at Westminster School. He was then a student at Magdalene College, Cambridge, under Thomas Johnson. He was elected a fellow of his college, proceeded to the degree of M.A., and died after a long illness on 30 December 1749. His funeral sermon, preached in the parish church of Long Ditton on 4 January 1751, by the Rev. Richard Wooddeson, M.A., master of the school at Kingston-on-Thames, was printed at London, in 1751.

== Works ==
His works are:

- Treatise of Space, 1733.
- A Defence of the Athanasian Creed, as a preservative against Heresy.
- A full and particular Reply to Mr. Chandler's Case of Subscription to Explanatory Articles of Faith, &c. 1749.

He also edited Daniel Waterland's Sermons on several important Subjects of Religion and Morality, 2 vols. Lond. 1742, 2nd ed. 1776.
