= Alexander Neville (scholar) =

Member of the Parliament of England

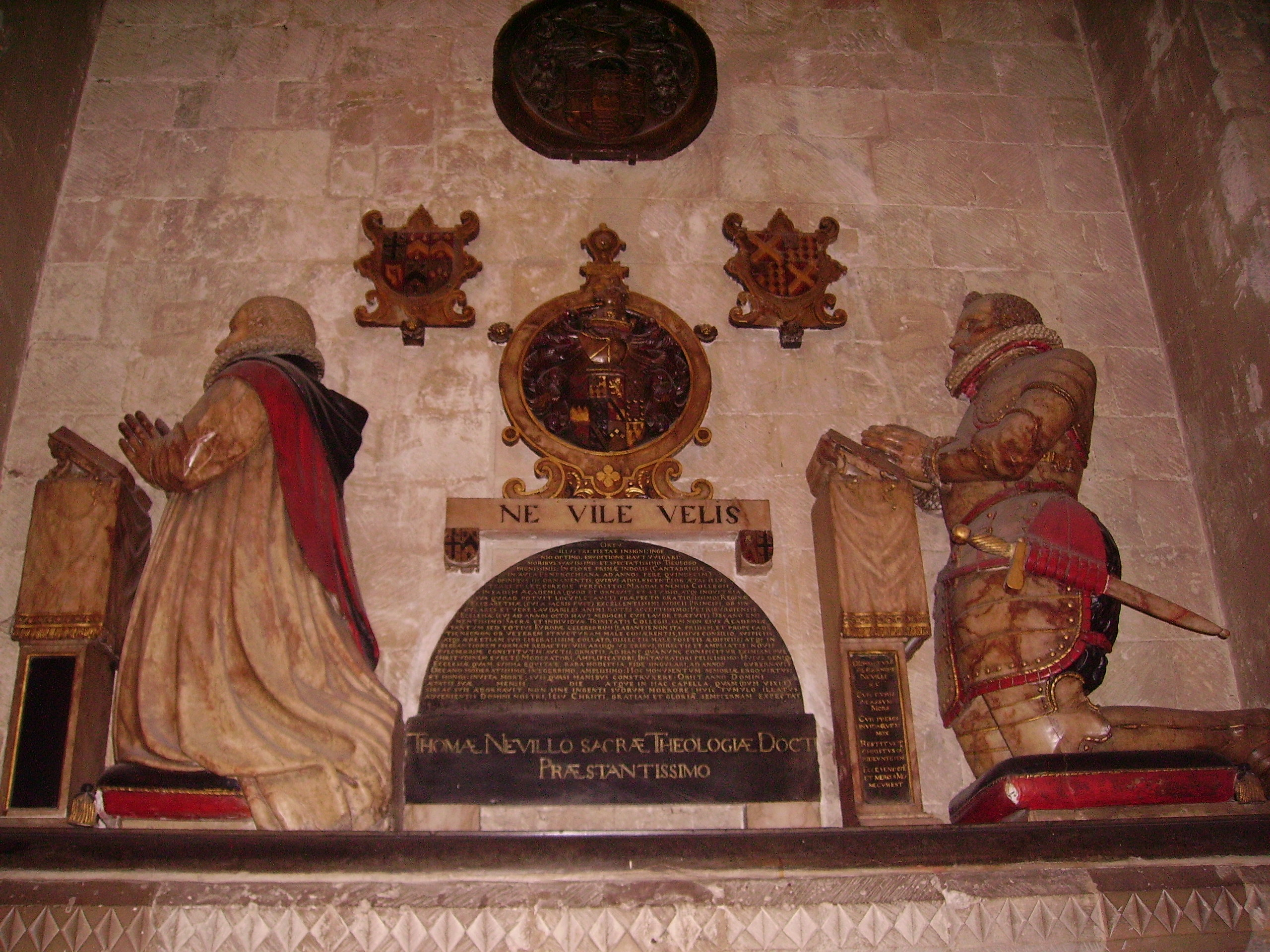
Monument with kneeling effigies of Alexander Nevile and his brother Thomas Nevile, Canterbury Cathedral.

Alexander Neville (1544–1614) was an English scholar, known as a historian and translator and a Member of the House of Commons.

== Life ==
Alexander Neville was the brother of Thomas Nevile, Dean of Canterbury, and son of Richard Neville of South Leverton, Nottinghamshire, by Anne Mantell, daughter of Sir Walter Mantell (d.1529) of Nether Heyford, Northamptonshire. His mother's sister, Margaret Mantell, was the mother of the poet Barnabe Googe.

Alexander was educated at St John's College, Cambridge, and graduated M.A. in 1581, at the same time as Robert Devereux, 2nd Earl of Essex. On leaving the university he seems to have studied law in London, where he became acquainted with George Gascoigne. He is one of the five friends whom Gascoigne describes as challenging him to write poems on Latin mottoes proposed by themselves. Neville soon entered the service of Archbishop Matthew Parker apparently as a secretary, and edited for him Tabula Heptarchiae Saxonicae.

He attended Parker's funeral on 6 June 1575, and wrote an elegy in Latin heroics. He remained in the service of Parker's successors, Edmund Grindal and John Whitgift.

Neville was a Member of Parliament, representing Christchurch in the Parliament of 1585, for Peterborough in 1597 and Saltash in that of 1601. (Note: Sidney Lee writing in 1894, suggested that he may be identical with the scholar Alexander Neville(1544-1614), secretary to Archbishop Parker, although this was uncertain (Lee 1894, p. 244). More recent scholarship by Elisabeth Leedham-Green for the 21st century Oxford Dictionary of National Biography has confirmed that they are one and the same person (Leedham-Green 2008).) But he appears to have been inactive.

He died on 4 October 1614, and was buried on 9 October in Canterbury Cathedral, where his brother Thomas, the dean, erected a monument to commemorate both his brother and himself.

He married Jane, daughter of Richard Duncombe of Morton, Buckinghamshire, and widow of Sir Gilbert Dethick, but left no issue.

== Works ==
His major work was an account in Latin of Kett's rebellion of 1549, to which he appended a description of Norwich and its antiquities. The work, which was undertaken under Parker's guidance, was entitled A. Nevylii ... de Furoribus Norfolcensium Ketto Duce. Eiusdem Norvicus, London (by Henry Binneman), 1575. A list of the mayors and sheriffs of Norwich was added. The dedication was addressed to Parker, and Thomas Drant prefixed verses. A passage in it spoke of the laziness of the Welsh levies who had taken part in the suppression of Kett's rebellion, and compared the Welsh soldiers to sheep. Offence was taken by the government at this sneer, and a new edition was at once issued with the offensive sentences omitted and an additional dedication to Archbishop Grindal, the successor of Parker. Neville also published in 1576 'A. Nevylii ad Walliae proceres apologia' (London, by Henry Binneman), in which he acknowledged his error of judgment. The account of Kett was appended under the title 'Kettus' to Christopher Ockland's Anglorum Praelia, 1582, and in 1615 an English translation by the Rev. Richard Woods of Norwich appeared with the title Norfolk Furies their Foyle under Kett and their Accursed Captaine: with a description of the famous Citye of Norwich; another edition is dated 1623.

Neville was also a writer of Latin verse and prose. His earliest publication was a translation of Seneca's Oedipus, into a rough ballad metre in 1563. Thomas Newton included it in his Seneca his Tenne Tragedies, London, 1581. In 1587 appeared Neville's Academiae Cantabrigiensis lacrymse tumulo ... P. Sidneij sacratae per A. Nevillum, Cambridge, 1587, with a dedication to the Earl of Leicester. Sir John Harington commended this poem in his annotations on Ariosto's Orlando Furioso (bk. 37).

Neville also contributed English verses to his cousin Barnabe Googe's Eglogs and Sonettes, 1563.
