= Wren Library =

Library in Trinity College, Cambridge, England

Coordinates: 52°12′25.56″N 0°6′53.64″E

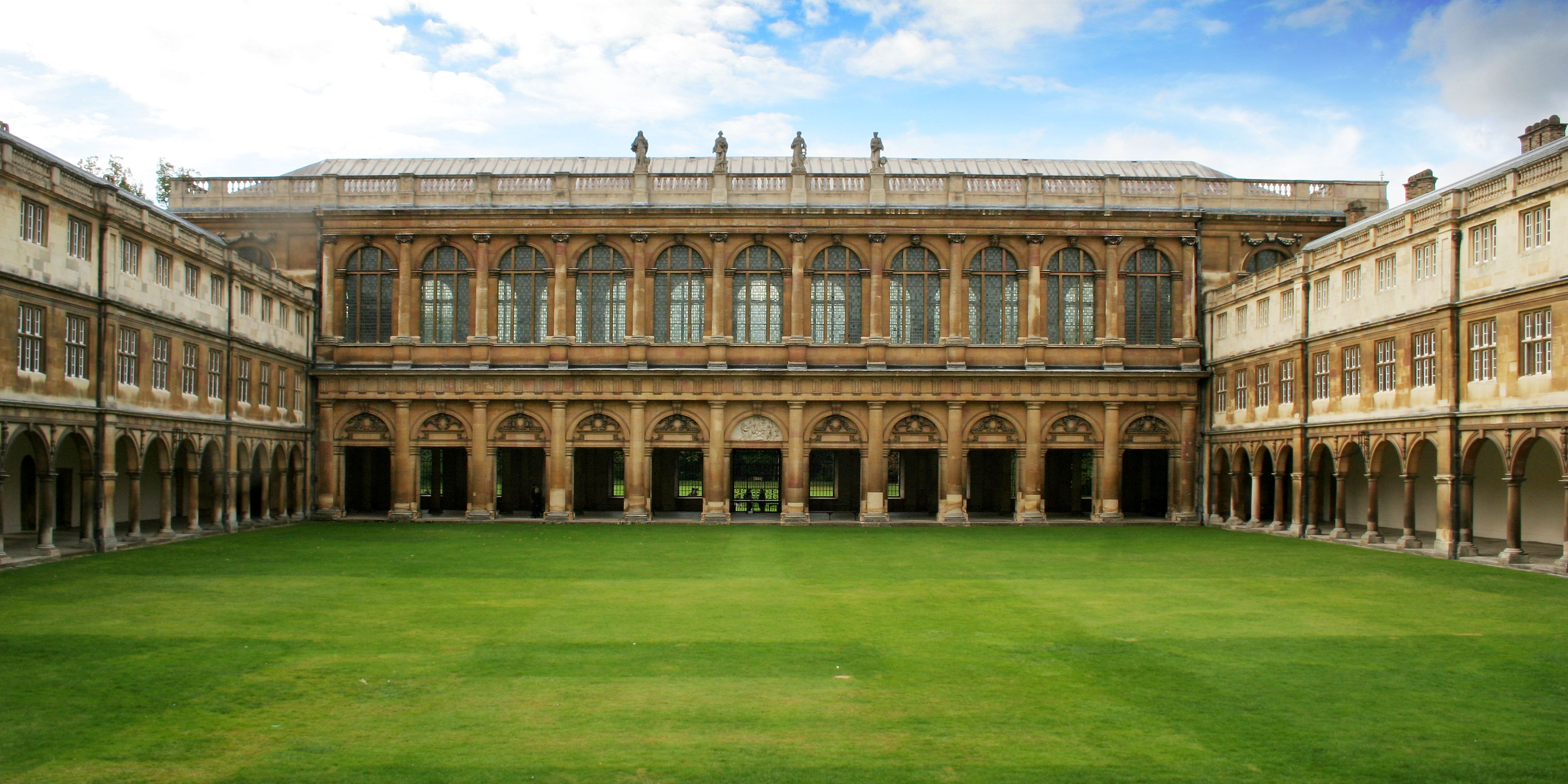
Wren Library seen from Nevile's Court

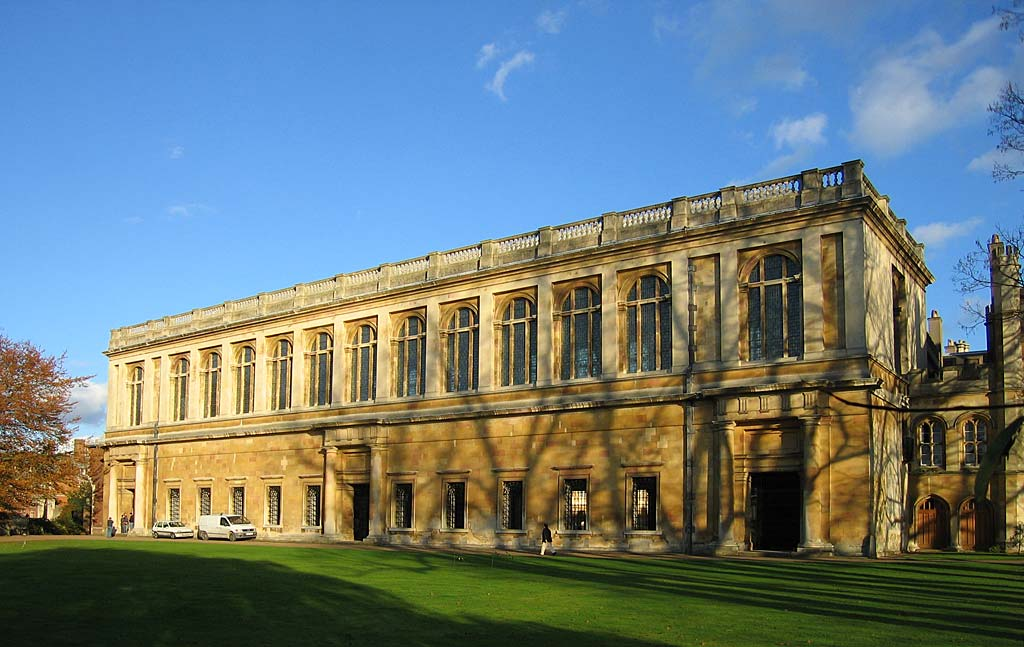
The library's rear façade as seen from the River Cam

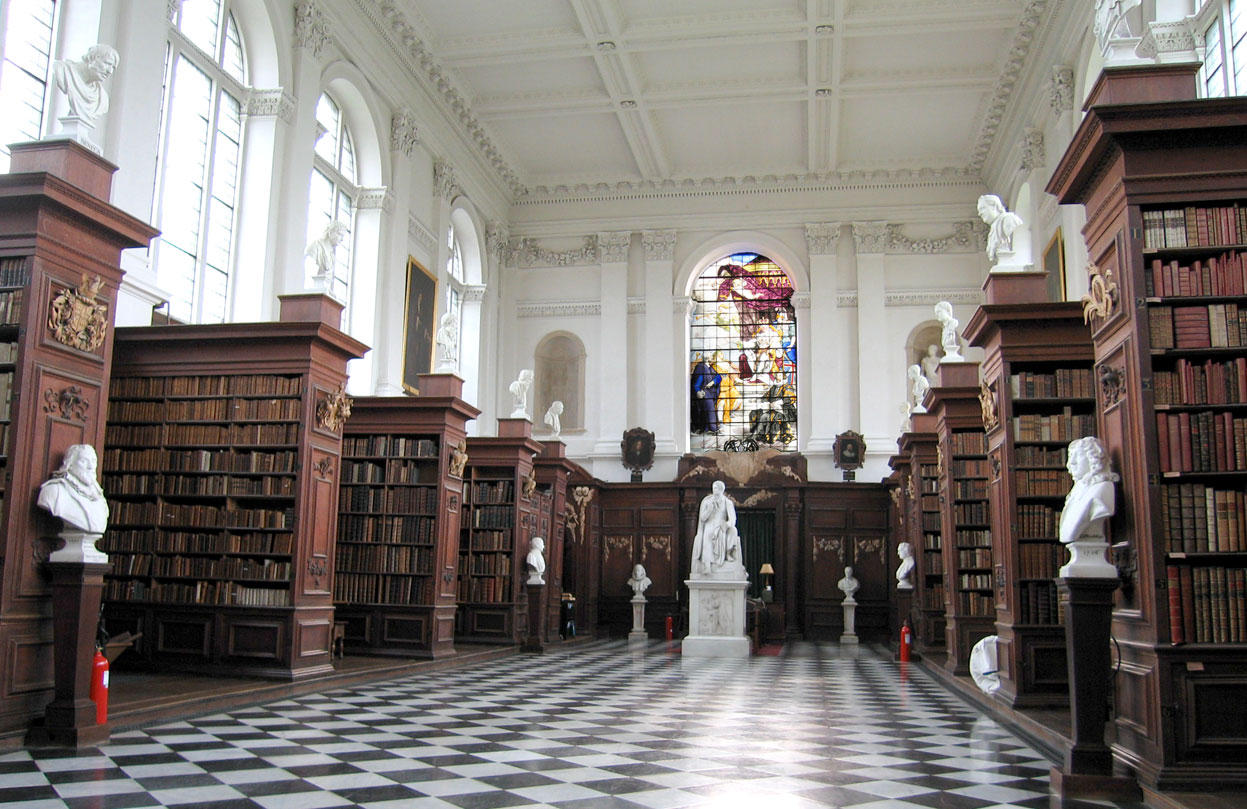
The interior of the library, showing the limewood carvings by Grinling Gibbons

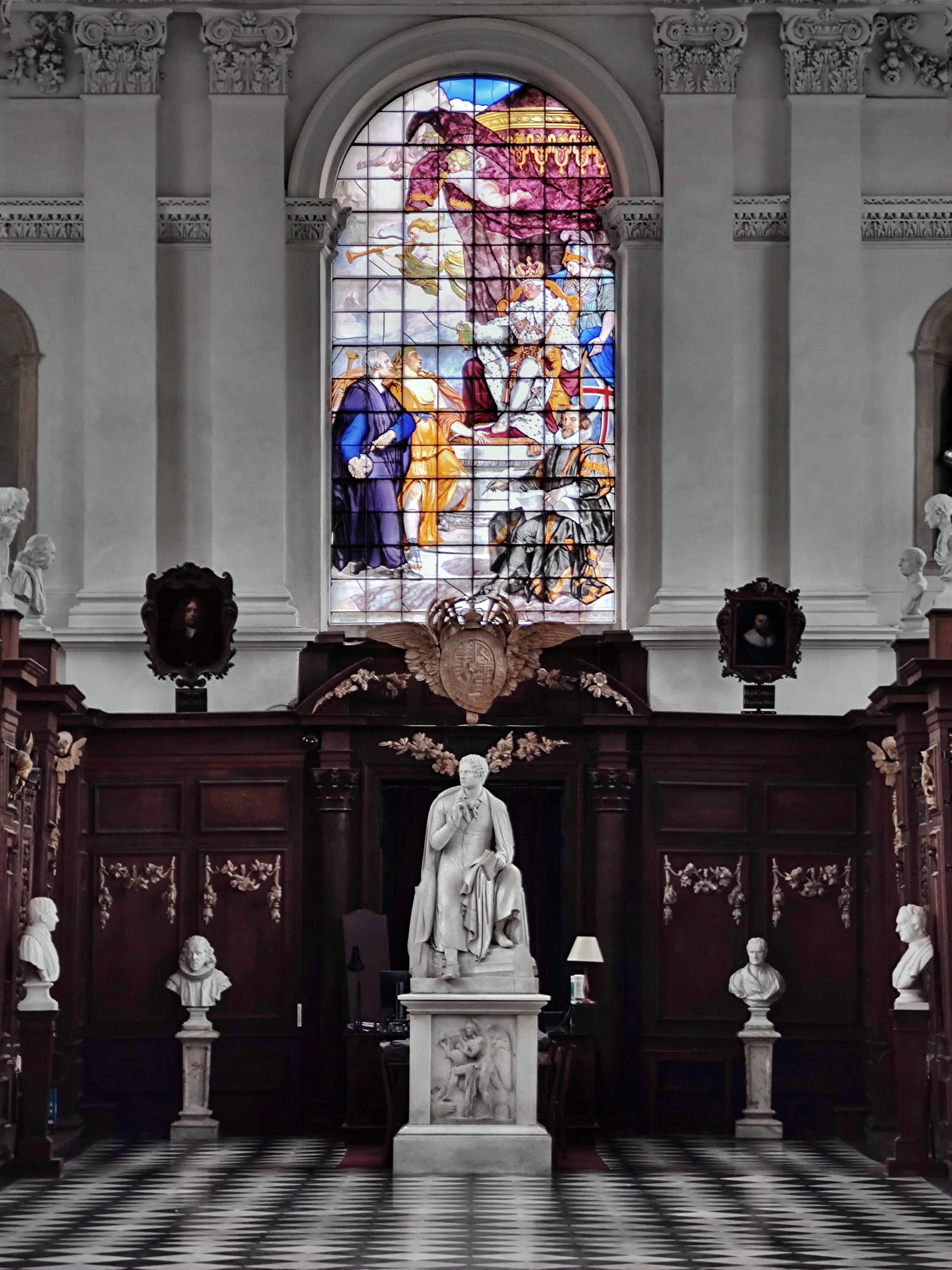
Stained glass window and Lord Byron statue at Wren Library's south end

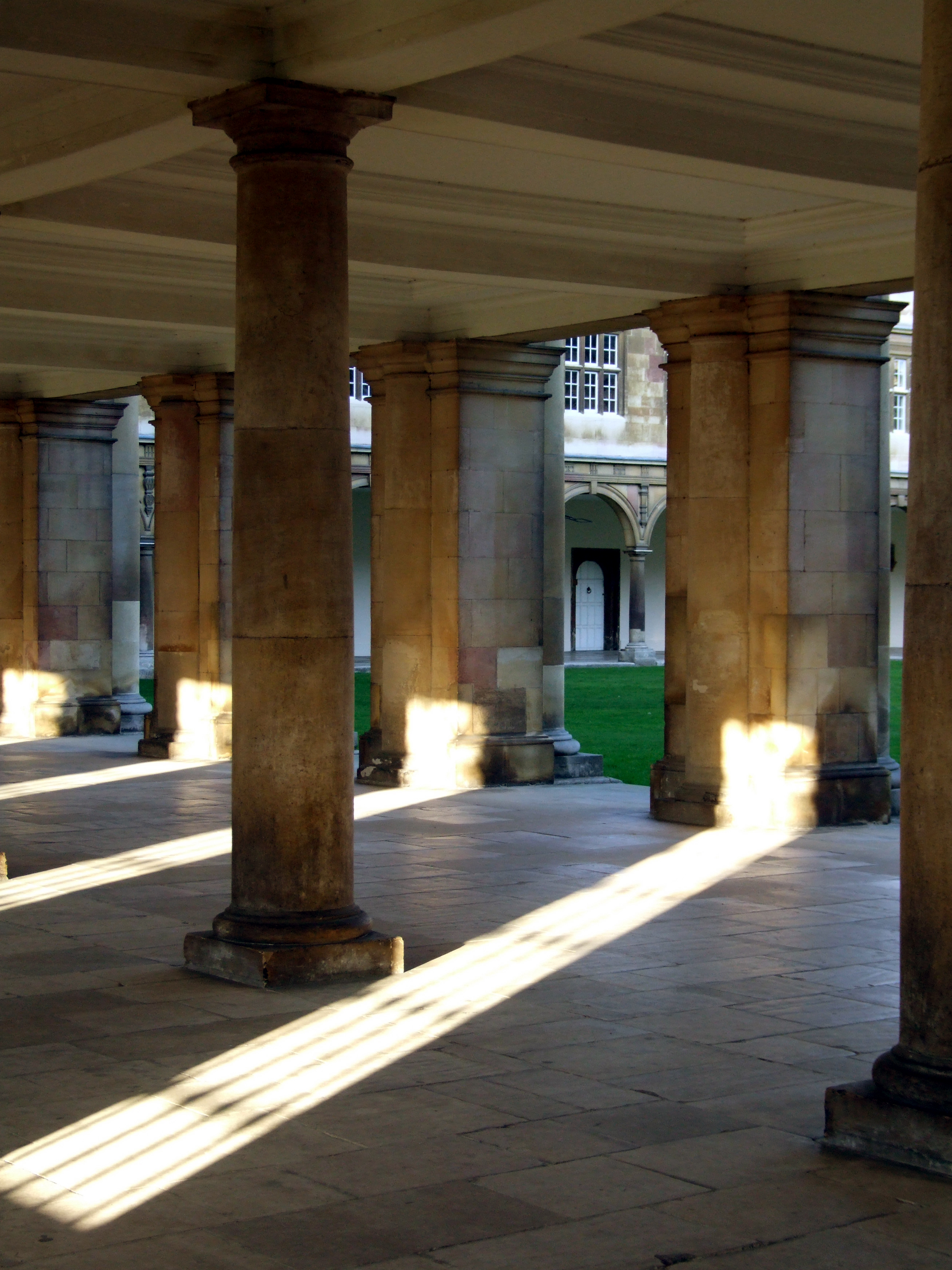
Cloisters beneath Wren Library's main room

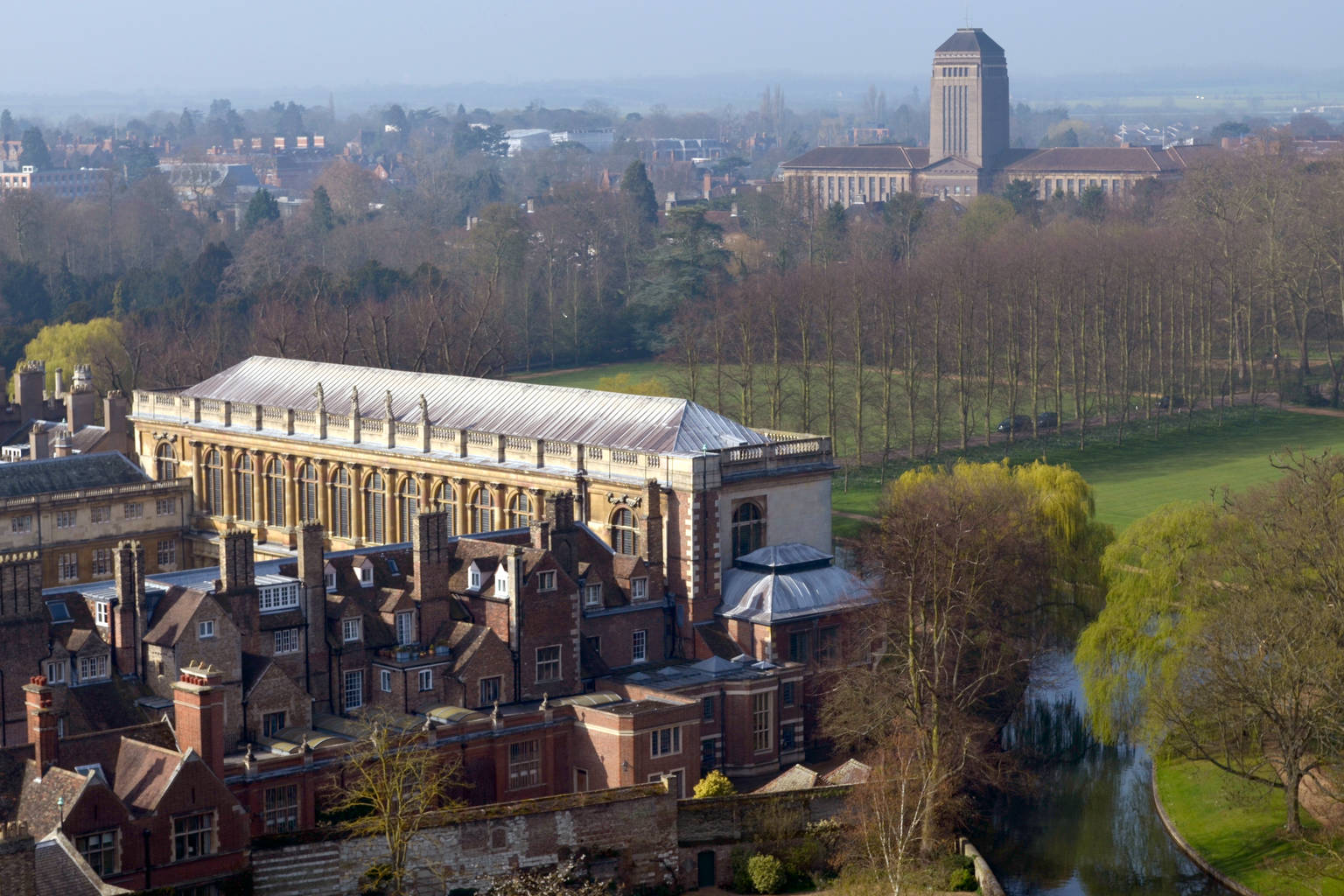
The Wren Library (foreground) and University Library (background) viewed from the chapel tower at St John's College

The Wren Library is the library of Trinity College in Cambridge. It was designed by Christopher Wren in 1676 and completed in 1695.

== Description ==
The library is a single large room built over an open colonnade on the ground floor of Nevile's Court. The floor of the library proper within the upper storey lies several feet below the external division between the two storeys, reconciling the demands of use with the harmony of architectural proportion. It is credited as being one of the first libraries to be built with large windows to give comfortable light levels to aid readers.

The book stacks are arranged in rows perpendicular to the walls under the intervals between the windows. At the end of each stack is a fine limewood carving by Grinling Gibbons, and above these are plaster cast busts of notable writers through the ages. Other marble busts standing on plinths depict notable members of the college and are mostly carved by Louis-François Roubiliac. A later addition is a full size statue of Lord Byron carved by Bertel Thorvaldsen, originally offered to Westminster Abbey for inclusion in Poets' Corner, but refused due to the poet's reputation for immorality.

Giovanni Battista Cipriani was commissioned to design the stained-glass window at the south end, and William Peckitt completed it in 1775. The 5.03 m (16.5 ft) × 2.44 m (8 ft 0 in) window shows Fame or the muse of the college in yellow robes presenting Isaac Newton to King George III, seated by an allegory of Britannia, while Francis Bacon records the proceedings, and two cherubim and a bare-breasted woman with a trumpet herald the occasion. Considered a distraction to the scholars, thick curtains covered the window in the 19th century.

On the east balustrade of the library's roof are four statues by Gabriel Cibber representing Divinity, Law, Physic (medicine), and Mathematics.

As part of the complex of buildings surrounding Nevile's Court, Great Court and New Court, the library is a Grade I listed building.

The other library designed by Wren is Lincoln Cathedral Library.

== Notable books ==
The library contains many notable rare books and manuscripts, many bequeathed by past members of the college.

Included in the collection are

- Isaac Newton's first edition copy of Philosophiae Naturalis Principia Mathematica with handwritten notes for the second edition.
- Isaac Newton's (1659–61) Notebook
- An eighth-century copy of the Epistles of St Paul
- About 1250 medieval manuscripts including the great 12th-century Eadwine Psalter from Christ Church, Canterbury, the 13th-century Anglo-Norman Trinity Apocalypse and the 15th-century Trinity Carol Roll.
- A. A. Milne's manuscript of Winnie-the-Pooh and The House at Pooh Corner.
- The Capell collection of early Shakespeare editions
- A collection of autograph poems by John Milton
- A 14th-century manuscript of The Vision of Piers Plowman
- Several works printed by William Caxton, including the first book printed in English and the first dated printed book produced in England
- Several notebooks written by Ludwig Wittgenstein
- Handwritten notes by Robert Oppenheimer describing the "Trinity" atomic bomb test in New Mexico, U.S.
- Ramanujan's "lost notebook"
- 1620 edition of William Morgan's translation of the bible into Welsh

== Digitisation programme ==
In early 2014 the library began a major programme of digitisation. To date, over 1100 of the 1250 medieval manuscripts owned by the college have been digitised and are freely available to read online. A link to the list of digitised manuscripts can be found in the external links below.

== Visiting ==
The library is open to the public, but opening times are limited. There is no admission charge for the Wren Library.

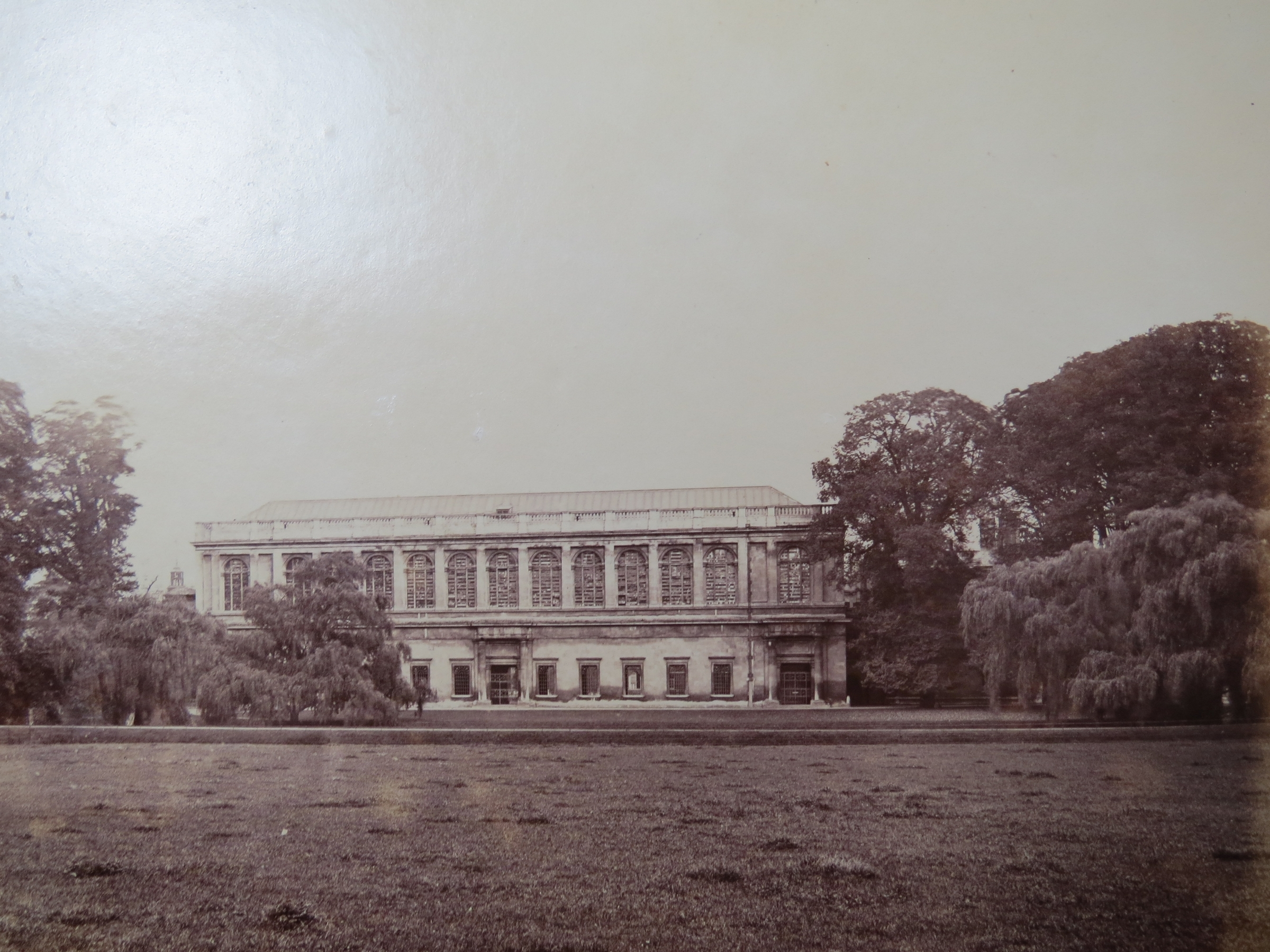
Historical photograph of the exterior, circa 1870

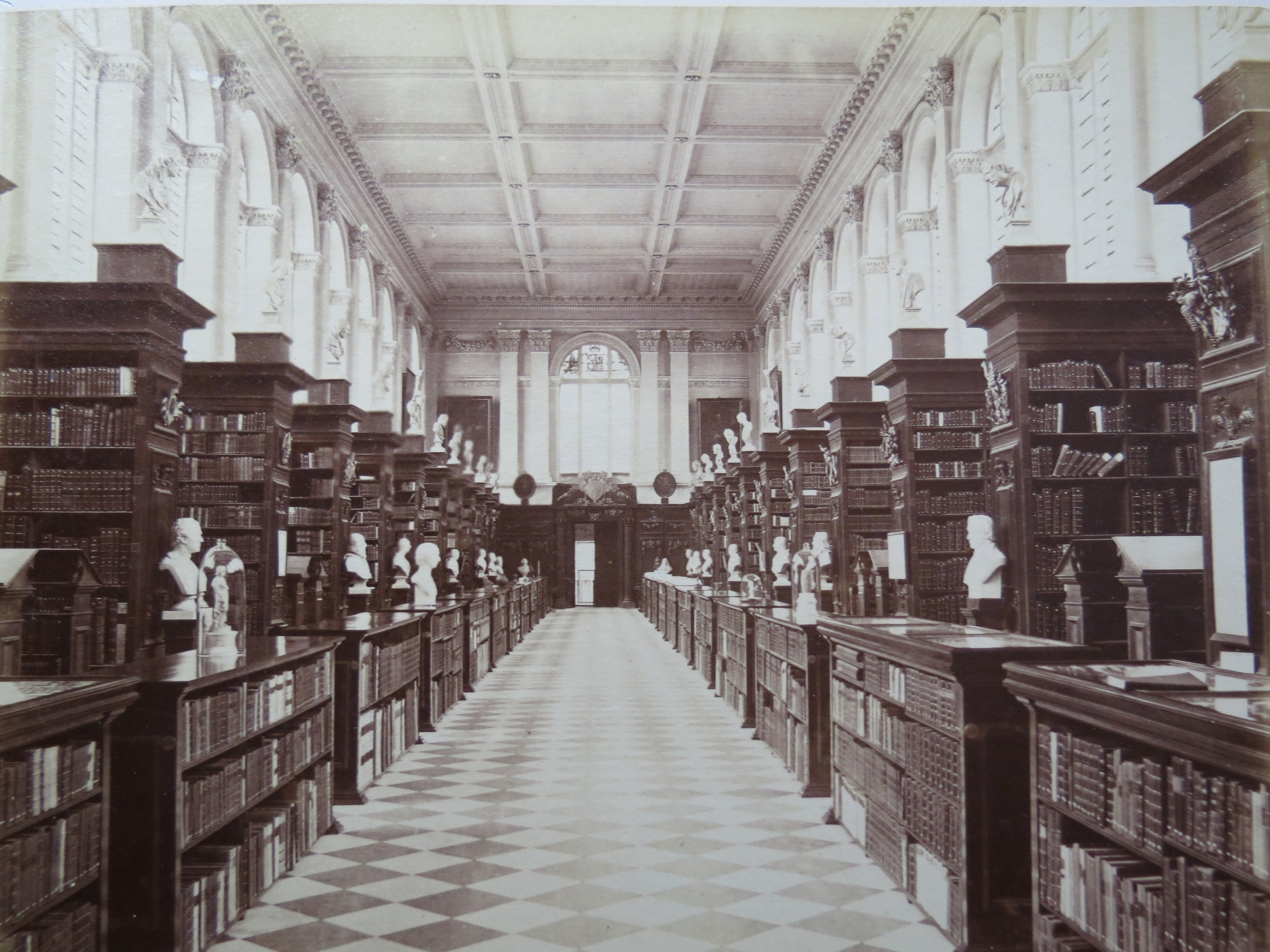
Historical photograph of the interior, circa 1870
