= John Howorth =

English priest and academic

John Howorth, D.D. (d. 1668) was a 17th-century priest and academic.

Howorth was born in Manchester and educated at Magdalene College, Cambridge. He was ordained in 1625; and became a prebendary of Peterborough in 1639. He was Fellow of Magdalene from 1645; Master of Magdalene from 1664 until his death in 1668; and Vice-Chancellor of the University of Cambridge from 1766 until 1767.

Academic offices
Preceded by Edward Rainbowe	Master of Magdalene College, Cambridge; 1664–1668	Succeeded by James Duport
Preceded by Francis Wilford	Vice-Chancellor of the University of Cambridge; 1666–1667	Succeeded by James Fleetwood
