= Fundamental articles (theology) =

Term in theology

Fundamental articles (articuli fundamentales fidei) was a term employed by early Protestant theologians, who wished to distinguish some essential parts of the Christian faith from non-essential doctrines. There were then a number of reasons for establishing such a distinction. Individual churches might accept or reject parts of doctrine, without forfeiting their claim to rank as parts of the universal Church. Therefore, theologians might find a dogmatic basis for union between separated churches. Also, the arguments of Catholics could be answered in a polemical way. To Protestants, the fundamental articles are those that Christians must believe to be saved.

Catholic attacks on this concept have been based on the argument that it is incoherent.

== Sixteenth century ==
The first to advance the theory seems to have been George Cassander (1513–66), a Catholic by religion. In his work De officio pii ac publicae tranquilitatis vere amantis viri in hoc religionis dissidio (1561), he maintained that the articles of the Apostles' Creed contain the true foundations of the Faith; and that those who accept these doctrines, and have no desire to sever themselves from the rest of Christendom are part of the true Church. He believed that thus it might be possible to find a means of reuniting Catholics, Greeks, and Protestants. But the proposal met with no favour on either side. The Louvain professors, Hesselius and Ravesteyn, argued that the theory was irreconcilable with Catholic theology and John Calvin no less vehemently repudiated the system.

Among Protestants, however, the view soon reappeared, as a reply to two objections they were constantly called on to meet. When Catholics told them that their total inability to agree amongst themselves was itself a proof that their system was a false one, they could answer that though differing as to non-essentials they were agreed on fundamentals. And when asked how it could be maintained that the whole Christian world had for centuries been sunk in error, they replied that since these errors had not destroyed the fundamentals of the faith, salvation was possible even before the gospel had been preached. It is asserted that the first to take up this standpoint was Antonio de Dominis, once Archbishop of Spalatro, who, during the reign of James I, sojourned some years in England. Certainly from this period the distinction becomes a recognized feature in the polemics of the Church of England, while on the other hand Roman Catholic writers are at pains to show its worthlessness.

== Knott and Potter ==
The concept fills an important place in the controversy between the Jesuit Edward Knott, and the Laudian Christopher Potter. At this time, the term fundamentals was understood to signify those doctrines necessary, as explicit belief, to salvation. Potter says:

"By Fundamental doctrines we mean such Catholique verities as are to be distinctly believed by every Christian that shall be saved".

Knott showed how discrepant were the views of leading Protestants as to what was fundamental. His attack forced his opponents to change their ground. William Chillingworth, who replied to him, while defining fundamental articles in a manner similar to Potter conceded that it was impossible to draw up any list of fundamental doctrines. He urged indeed that this mattered little, since the Bible constitutes the religion of Protestants, and he who accepts the Bible knows that he has accepted all the essentials of the Faith.

== Calixt ==
The doctrine of fundamentals was destined to become notable not merely in England, but in Germany and France also. In Germany it assumed prominence in connection with the Syncretist dispute. The founder of the Syncretist school was the eminent Lutheran theologian, George Calixt (1586–1656). A man of wide culture and pacific disposition, he desired to effect a reconciliation between Catholics, Lutherans and Calvinists. In a treatise entitled Desiderium et studium concordiae ecclesiasticae (1650), he argued that the Apostles' Creed, which each of these three religions accepted, contained the fundamental doctrines of the Christian faith, and that the points on which they were at variance were no insuperable bar to union. These differences, he held, might be composed, if it were agreed to accept as revealed truth all that is contained in Scripture, and further all that is taught by the Fathers of the first five centuries. This eirenicon brought down upon him the most vehement attacks from the extreme party of his coreligionists, above all from Calovius, the representative of rigid Lutheranism. It was warmly debated, and proved quite abortive.

== Bossuet and Jurieu ==
The most famous of the controversies on this subject was that between Bossuet and the Calvinist Jurieu. Jurieu's book, Le Vray Système de l'Eglise (1686), marks a distinct stage in the development of Protestant theology; while the work in which Bossuet replied to him was effective. Le Vray Systeme was an attempt to demonstrate the right of the French Protestants to rank as members of the Church Universal. With this aim Jurieu propounded an entirely novel theory regarding the Church's essential constitution. According to him all sects without exception are members of Body of Christ. For this nothing is necessary but "to belong to a general confederation, to confess Jesus Christ as Son of God, as Saviour of the world, and as Messias; and to receive the Old and New Testaments as the rule and Law of Christians", (Système, p. 53).

Among the various portions of the Church he distinguishes four classes:

1. Sects that have retained all the truths taught in the Scriptures
2. Sects that, while retaining the more important truths, have mingled with them superstitions and errors
3. Sects that have retained the fundamental truths, but have added doctrines incompatible with them
4. Sects that have set the fundamental verities aside altogether

This last class are dead members of the mystical body (ibid., p. 52). Those who have retained the fundamental articles of the faith are, one and all, living parts of the Church. When he comes to define precisely which in doctrines are, and which are not, fundamental, Jurieu bids us fall back on the rule of Vincent of Lérins: Quod semper, quod ubique, quod ab omnibus. Wherever all bodies of Christians still exist and possess some importance in the world, and agree in accepting a dogma, that agreement constitutes a criterion that may be considered infallible. Among truths so guaranteed are the doctrine of the Trinity, the Divinity of Jesus Christ, the Redemption, the satisfaction, original sin, creation, grace, the immortality of the soul, the eternity of punishment (ibid, 236–237). This work was followed, in 1688, by another entitled Traité de l'unité de l'Eglise et des articles fondamentaux, written in reply to Nicole's criticisms. In the same year appeared Bossuet's Histoire des Variations des Eglises protestantes. The Bishop of Meaux pointed out that this was the third different theory of the Church advanced by Protestant theologians to defend their position. The first reformers had accepted the Scriptural doctrine of an indefectible visible Church. When it was demonstrated that this doctrine was totally incompatible with their denunciation of pre-reformation Christianity, their successors took refuge in the theory of an invisible Church. It had been made patent that this was contrary to the express words of Scripture; and their controversialists had, in consequence, been compelled to look for a new' position. This Jurieu had provided in his theory of a Church founded upon fundamental articles.

Jurieu replied; he argued against the main thesis of the "variations" by contending that changes of dogma had been characteristic of the Christian Church from its earliest days. Bossuet, in his Avertissement aux Protestants sur les lettres de M. Jurieu, said that if this were true, then the principle, Quod semper, quod ubique, quod ab omnibus - according to Jurieu the criterion of a fundamental article - had ceased to possess the smallest value. (Avertissement, I, n. 22.)

In regard to the relation of the fundamental doctrines to salvation, Jurieu is in agreement with the English divines already quoted. "By fundamental points", he says, "we understand certain general principles of the Christian religion, a distinct faith and belief in which are necessary to salvation" (Traité, p. 495). Precisely the same view is expressed by John Locke in his The Reasonableness of Christianity. After enumerating what he regards as the fundamental articles of faith, he says: "An explicit belief of these is absolutely required of all those to whom the Gospel of Jesus Christ is preached, and salvation through his name proposed" (Works, ed., 1740, I, 583).

== Daniel Waterland (1683-1740) ==
Daniel Waterland's Discourse of Fundamentals is the only work by an Anglican theologian explicitly devoted to this subject. Its professed aim is to determine a basis for intercommunion among various Christian bodies. It dates from 1734 to 1735 and takes a High Church line.

The treatment is quite academic. Waterland enumerates no less than ten different views on the selection of articles, which he rejects as inadequate. "We have", he says, "almost as many different rules for determinating fundamentals as there are different sects or parties."

No one could decide what should be the principle of selection. From this time the topic had less attention from Protestant writers, having in the seventeenth century filled an important place in Protestant theology.

== Catholic view ==
According to Catholic teaching, the essential note of faith lies in the complete and unhesitating acceptance of the whole depositum on the ground that it is the revealed word of God. The conscious rejection of a single article of this deposit is sufficient to render a man guilty of heresy. The question is not as to the relative importance of the article in question but solely as to whether it has been revealed by God to man. This is clearly put by Thomas Aquinas in the Summa Theologica II-II:5:3:

"In a heretic who rejects a single article of the faith, there remains the virtue of faith whether as united with charity [formata], or as severed from charity [informis]. . . The formal object of faith is the Supreme Truth in so far as revealed in the Holy Scriptures and in that doctrine of the Church that proceeds from the Supreme Truth. Hence if anyone does not hold to the doctrine of the Church as to an infallible and divine rule, ... he does not possess the virtue of faith."

The Catholic Church does not deny that certain truths are more vital than others. There are some as to which it is important that all the faithful should possess explicit knowledge. In regard to others explicit knowledge is not necessary. But it denies that any Christian may reject or call in question any truth, small or great, revealed by God.

The Catholic Church's one and only one test, to determine the question of membership in Christ's body, does not lie in the acceptance of this or that particular doctrine, but in communion with the Apostolic hierarchy. It argues that the theory that finds the one requisite in the acceptance of a series of fundamental articles is a novelty without support in the Church Fathers.
