= Richard Carre =

Master of Magdalene College, Cambridge, 1546–1559

Richard Carre, LL.D was Master of Magdalene College, Cambridge from 1546 until his ejection in 1559.
