= Barnabas Gooch =

English politician (died c. 1626)

Arms of Gooch of Alvingham in Lincolnshire: Azure, three boars argent eared tusked and hoofed or

Barnabas Gooch or Goche or Gough (died c. 1626) was an English lawyer and academic who was Vice-Chancellor of the University of Cambridge from 1611 to 1612. He was also a politician who sat in the House of Commons from 1621 to 1624.

Gooch was born at Alvingham, Lincolnshire, the son of Barnabe Googe, poet and scholar. He matriculated from Magdalene College, Cambridge in Autumn 1582 and was awarded BA in 1587, MA in 1590 and LLD in 1604. He became Master of Magdalene in 1604 and held the post until his death in 1626. In 1605 he was incorporated at Oxford University. He was Vice-Chancellor of Cambridge University from 1611 to 1612 He was admitted as an advocate on 4 February 1613. From 1615 to 1625 he was Commissary of the University.

When Thomas Audley, 1st Baron Audley of Walden refounded Buckingham College, Cambridge as Magdalene in 1542, he donated to the college seven acres of property at Aldgate in London. This property would have brought enormous income had it been retained by the college. However, under the conspiracy of the Elizabethan banker Benedict Spinola, the property was permanently alienated to the Crown in 1574. The transaction involved Spinola luring the master and fellows of the time to accept an increase in the annual rental from £9 to £15 a year in exchange for the property. The loss of the Aldgate property left the college in poverty. The transaction was contested multiple times without success. The first and most famous such lawsuit, the Earl of Oxford's case, was pursued in 1615 by Gooch. This court case landed Gooch and the senior fellow in prison for two years. Gooch was subsequently offered £10,000 as a compromise, which he refused to accept.

In 1621, Gooch was elected Member of Parliament for Cambridge University and for Truro and chose to sit for the university. He was re-elected MP for Cambridge University in 1624. He was Chancellor of Worcester and Exeter. He was a benefactor to Magdalene College.

Gooch died at Exeter in about 1626.

Academic offices
Preceded by John Palmer	Master of Magdalene College, Cambridge; 1604–1626	Succeeded by Henry Smyth
Preceded by Fogge Newton	Vice-Chancellor of the University of Cambridge; 1611–1612	Succeeded by Valentine Cary
Parliament of England
Preceded by Sir Miles Sandys; Sir Francis Bacon	Member of Parliament for Cambridge University; 1621–1624; With: (Sir) Robert Naunton	Succeeded by Sir Robert Naunton; Sir Albert Morton
Preceded by Thomas Russell; Thomas Burgess, junior	Member of Parliament for Truro; 1621; With: John Trefusis	Succeeded by Sir John Catcher; John Trefusis
