= Ecclesiastical Commission of 1686 =

The Ecclesiastical Commission was an English court of enquiry established in July 1686 by James II under the Royal prerogative, and headed by Judge Jeffreys. It was declared to have jurisdiction over the governance of the Church of England also empowered to try all offences punishable under ecclesiastical law. It was disbanded shortly before the Glorious Revolution.

== Activities ==
The Ecclesiastical Commission was in effect a revival of the Court of High Commission, declared illegal by the Long Parliament during the reign of Charles I by the Triennial Act 1640, and was intended by James II as a means to move England back towards Catholicism by sanctioning those hostile to it, and enforce the king's religious policy generally. During its existence, the Commission suspended Henry Compton, the Bishop of London, from his activities as bishop, and the Vice-chancellor of Cambridge University, John Peachell, for refusing the king's commands.

Due to the increasing unpopularity of James II's religious policy, the Ecclesiastical Commission was disbanded on his instructions after the acquittals in the Trial of the Seven Bishops. Following James' overthrow in the Glorious Revolution, Parliament (with the assent of the new King William III) passed the Bill of Rights 1689, which declared it and "all other Commissions and Courts of like nature" to be illegal.
