= Joshua Bassett (academic) =

English academic

Joshua Bassett or Basset (c. 1641 – c. 1720 in London) was an English academic, Master of Sidney Sussex College, Cambridge under James II.

Bassett was the son of John Bassett, a merchant from King's Lynn, Norfolk. In 1657 he was admitted to Caius College, Cambridge, aged 16; he gained his MA in 1665 and became a fellow of Caius. He was ordained deacon in 1663 and priest of the Church of England in 1666.

King James II had him installed as Master of Sidney Sussex College by a royal mandate dated 3 January 1687, brought by Alban Francis, a Benedictine monk who functioned as Basset's chaplain. Bassett had declared himself a Catholic convert. The college had been founded in 1596 as an avowedly Protestant foundation. The fellows of Sidney requested that their new master should take the anti-Catholic oath required by the college statutes, so a second royal mandate was issued on 12 January dispensing Bassett from taking the oaths of allegiance and supremacy. On 25 February a royal warrant exempted Bassett and other Cambridge converts from the oaths. Bassett was finally admitted as master on 7 March 1687.

Bassett had a room in the Master's Lodge fitted as a Catholic chapel. The college chapel continued to be used for Anglican services, although Bassett locked the chapel door to prevent its use for the Gunpowder day service on 5 November 1687.

In mid-November 1688, during the Glorious Revolution, Bassett fled the college. He had controversially altered various aspects of college regulations and routine before he was removed as master.

One publication Ecclesiae Theoria Nova Dodwelliana Exposita (1713) bears his name on the title page but he has been proposed as author of other works, including Reason and Authority (1687) and Essay towards a proposal for a Catholic communion ... by a minister of the Church of England (1704).

He is said to have died in poverty.
