= John Palmer (Master of Magdalene College) =

English clergyman and academic

John Palmer (died June 1607) was an English clergyman and academic who was Master of Magdalene from 1597 to 1604, but died in a debtors' prison.

Palmer was of Kent. He matriculated at St John's College, Cambridge in Autumn 1567. He was awarded BA in 1572 and became a Fellow in 1573. He was awarded MA in 1675. In 1580 he was incorporated at Oxford University. He was Proctor of his college from 1587 to 1588. He was awarded DD in 1595. From 1595 to 1604 he was Master of Magdalene College, Cambridge. He was Dean of Peterborough from 1597 to 1607 and Prebendary of Lichfield from 1605 to 1607.

Palmer was imprisoned for debt, and died in prison in June 1607.

Palmer made a clandestine marriage to Katherine Knevit, daughter of William Knevit of Little Vastern Park, Wiltshire on 29 March 1593.

== Notes ==
Parliament of England
Academic offices
Preceded by Richard Clayton	Master of Magdalene College, Cambridge; 1595–1604	Succeeded by Barnabas Gooch
