= John Balderston (academic) =

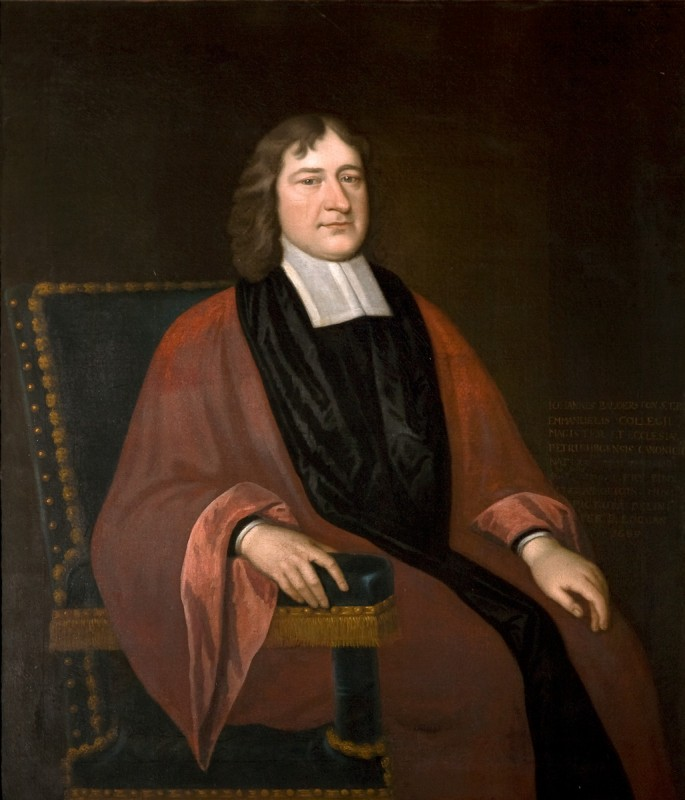
John Balderston by Thomas Frye

John Balderston (c. 1640–1719) was an academic at the University of Cambridge, master of Emmanuel College and twice vice-chancellor of the university.

Balderston was born in Thurning, Northamptonshire and educated at St Paul's School, London. He entered Emmanuel College, Cambridge in 1659, graduating B.A in 1663, M.A. in 1666, B.D. in 1673, D.D. in 1681. He was a Fellow of Emmanuel College from 1665 to 1680; and Master from 1680 until his death in 1719. In 1681 he was appointed to a canonry at Peterborough Cathedral. He was Vice-Chancellor of the University of Cambridge in 1687–8, selected when John Peachell was removed by King James II, and again in 1706–7. Peachell was turned out of the vice-chancellorship for refusing the degree of Master of Arts to the Catholic Benedictine monk Alban Francis whom James II had armed with letters of recommendation, Balderstone was chosen to succeed him "as a man of much spirit," and he promised that "during his magistracy neither religion nor the rights of the University should suffer by his means."

Balderston died in 1719, and was buried in Peterborough Cathedral on 6 September 1719.
