= Edward Abbott (Master of Magdalene College) =

Master of Magdalene College

Edward Abbott (died 11 August 1746) was a priest of the Church of England and academic.

Abbott was born in Middlesex and educated at Eton College and Magdalene College, Cambridge. He was ordained in 1724 by the bishop of London and held livings at Radwinter and Faulkbourne in Essex. He was Master of Magdalene from 1740 until his death in 1746.
