= Samuel Clarke =

English philosopher and cleric (1675–1729)

The Reverend Samuel Clarke
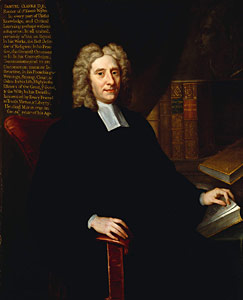
- Samuel Clarke, portrait attributed to Charles Jervas
- Born: 11 October 1675; Norwich, England
- Died: 17 May 1729 (aged 53); London, England
- Occupations: Philosopher, priest
- Spouse: Katherine Lockwood (m. 1700)
- Children: 7
- Father: Edward Clarke
- Relatives: John Clarke (uncle)

Education
- Education: Gonville and Caius College, Cambridge

Philosophical work
- Era: Age of Enlightenment
- Region: Western philosophy
- School: Nontrinitarianism • Semi-Arianism • Subordinationism
- Institutions: Gonville and Caius College, Cambridge
- Main interests: Metaphysics, Christian theology
- Notable works: Book of Common Prayer
- Notable ideas: Moral fitness theory

Samuel Clarke (11 October 1675 – 17 May 1729) was an English philosopher and Anglican priest. He is considered the major British figure in philosophy between John Locke and George Berkeley. Clarke's altered, Nontrinitarian revision of the 1662 Book of Common Prayer continues to influence worship among modern Unitarians.

== Early life and studies ==
Clarke was born in Norwich, the son of Edward Clarke, an alderman of Norwich and Member of Parliament, and brother of John Clarke. He was educated at Norwich School and Gonville and Caius College, Cambridge. His tutor at Caius was John Ellis, a personal friend of Isaac Newton, but who in natural philosophy taught in line with the Cartesianism that prevailed in the university.

Clarke, however, came to adopt the new physical system of Newton; he used the vehicle of an annotated translation of a work on physics in the Cartesian tradition to comment on the superiority of the Newtonian system. This textbook was published in 1697, and in the same year Clarke met the Newtonian William Whiston. It was a chance encounter in Norwich, but Whiston was then chaplain to John Moore, bishop of Norwich. Having taken holy orders, Clarke became chaplain to Moore in Whiston's place, and was presented by Moore to the rectory of Drayton, Norfolk.

In 1706, through the influence of Moore, Clarke obtained the rectory of St Benet Paul's Wharf, London. Soon afterwards Queen Anne appointed him one of her chaplains in ordinary, and in 1709 presented him to the rectory of St James's, Westminster. His church brought Clarke into personal contact with Newton.

== Boyle Lectures (1704) ==
Clarke was Boyle lecturer for two years, and produced two books. The Newtonian theologians used the Boyle Lectures to attack opponents (Thomas Hobbes and Baruch Spinoza, deists and freethinkers in particular). Clarke's lectures set the agenda for further debates. He dealt in 1704 with the Being and Attributes of God, an example of a physico-theological system; and in 1705 with the Evidences of Natural and Revealed Religion. These books were later published together.

Clarke's reputation rested largely on his effort to demonstrate the existence of God, and his theory of the foundation of rectitude. The former is not a purely a priori argument, and it was not presented as such. The intelligence, for example, of the self-existence and original cause of all things is, he says, "not easily proved a priori," but "demonstrably proved a posteriori from the variety and degrees of perfection in things, and the order of causes and effects, from the intelligence that created beings are confessedly endowed with, and from the beauty, order, and final purpose of things." The theses maintained in the argument are:

1. That something has existed from eternity
2. that there has existed from eternity some one immutable and independent being
3. that that immutable and independent being, which has existed from eternity, without any external cause of its existence, must be self-existent, that is, necessarily existing
4. what the substance or essence of that being is, which is self-existent or necessarily existing, we have no idea, neither is it at all possible for us to comprehend it
5. that though the substance or essence of the self-existent being is itself absolutely incomprehensible to us, yet many of the essential attributes of his nature are strictly demonstrable as well as his existence, and, in the first place, that he must be of necessity eternal
6. that the self-existent being must of necessity be infinite and omnipresent
7. must be but one
8. must be an intelligent being
9. must be not a necessary agent, but a being endued with liberty and choice
10. must of necessity have infinite power
11. must be infinitely wise, and
12. must of necessity be a being of infinite goodness, justice, and truth, and all other moral perfections, such as become the supreme governor and judge of the world.

In order to establish his sixth thesis, Clarke contended that time and space, eternity and immensity, are not substances, but attributes: the attributes of a self-existent being.

The work of Clarke on the existence of God set off a British debate that lasted to the middle of the century. Edmund Law and other writers represented Clarke as arguing from the existence of time and space to the existence of Deity. Law was influenced by a 1718 work of Samuel Colliber that modified Clarke's approach.

== Correspondence with Anthony Collins ==
The public correspondence of Samuel Clarke with the English freethinker Anthony Collins in 1707 and 1708 was a debate on the nature of consciousness. The principal focus of the correspondence was the possibility of a materialist theory of mind. Collins defended the materialist position that consciousness was an emergent property of the brain, while Clarke opposed such a view and argued that mind and consciousness must be distinct from matter. The correspondence also inquired into the origins of consciousness, personal identity, free will, and determinism.

The debate arose from a controversy of 1706 on the immortality of the soul. Clarke published a refutation of the views of Henry Dodwell, and this drew in Collins, who wrote a Letter to Mr Dodwell in his defence. By the sixth edition (1731), Clarke's own Letter to Mr Dodwell of 1706 had grown to 475 pages, including the replies of Collins. Clarke's main argument against Dodwell was that the soul, being immaterial, must be immortal. John Norris argued differently, though on Clarke's side of the debate, using in particular the ideas of Malebranche. Collins challenged Clarke on the ground of his substance dualism.

== Nontrinitarianism ==
=== The Scripture Doctrine of the Trinity (1712) ===
Clarke studied scripture in the original languages, and the primitive Christian writers. He took the degree of doctor in divinity in 1710, defending as his thesis the two propositions: Nullum fidei Christianae dogma, in Sacris Scripturis traditum, est rectae rationi dissentaneum [No doctrine of the Christian faith, delivered in the Holy Scriptures, is contrary to right reason.], and Sine actionum humanarum libertate nulla potest esse religio [Without the freedom of human actions, there can be no religion.]. The formal disputation was long remembered for Clarke's virtuosity; but the presiding Regius Professor, Henry James, received the distinct impression that Clarke's views on the Trinity were unorthodox. Clarke was required to swear to keep the 39 Articles; and his attempt at self-justification by putting his views in book form were not immediately successful.

During 1712 Clarke published his treatise on The Scripture Doctrine of the Trinity. It is divided into three parts. The first contains a collection and exegesis of texts in the New Testament relating to the doctrine of the Trinity; in the second the doctrine is set out, and explained as a set of propositions; and in the third passages in the liturgy of the Church of England relating to the doctrine of the Trinity are considered.

Whiston claimed that, some time before publication, a message was sent to Clarke by Sidney Godolphin, to the effect "the affairs of the public were with difficulty then kept in the hands of those that were for liberty", and that therefore it was a bad time for the publication of a controversial book. Clarke in any case took no notice of any Whig qualms.

Maurice Wiles calls Clarke's views "moderate Arianism". At the time they were certainly denounced as Arianism; they belonged, as did Newton's, to the type of antitrinitarianism later called "High Arianism". Clarke's position was subordinationist, and less radical than Newton's and typical English Unitarians of his time. He looked at 1251 biblical texts, and rejected the added phrase known as the Johannine Comma. He made a more careful case than Whiston.

=== The Trinitarian controversy ===
The controversy within the Church of England to which Clarke was a major contributor had been initiated by George Bull, with his publication in 1685 of views on the opinions of the Church Fathers before the First Council of Nicaea (325 AD). He was reacting to issues that had been raised elsewhere in Europe, by Petavius, by Christopher Sandius and Daniel Zwicker for the Socinian camp, and the Arminians.

It was only with the close discussions of Clarke and his major opponent Daniel Waterland, a generation later, that the theological and historical points involved came clearly into focus. Clarke and Waterland had definite differences on the theology of consubstantiality and aseity.

Waterland argued in theology for the Anglican orthodoxy of time, in particular that the possible attitudes were, besides the orthodox Athanasian view, limited to Arianism and Sabellianism; and that the two latter were not consistent with Scripture. He also championed Bull's historical claim, that the Fathers before Nicaea held the views that were orthodox after Nicaea. Clarke's resistance to both points has had support from some modern scholars.

The trajectory of the English controversy from 1712 involved at least ten writers. By summer 1714 the debate on The Scripture Doctrine of the Trinity had ramified, and provoked a formal complaint from the Lower House of Convocation: the Blasphemy Act 1697 still made it an offence for "any person, educated in or having made profession of the Christian religion, by writing, preaching, teaching or advised speaking, to deny the Holy Trinity". Clarke drew up an apologetic preface, and then gave explanations which satisfied the Upper House of Convocation. He had strong supporters among the bishops. Clarke promised not to preach or write on the topic. Arthur Ashley Sykes and John Jackson from then on acted as his proxies. Other main participants in the controversy were John Edwards, Francis Gastrell, James Knight who published with Bull's biographer Robert Nelson, Richard Mayo of Great Kimble (son of the nonconformist Richard Mayo), Stephen Nye, Edward Welchman and Edward Wells.

Caroline of Ansbach, the Princess of Wales, requested that Clarke defend his views in a disputation with Edward Hawarden, and it took place in 1719, in her presence. Hawarden returned to the subject in Answer to Dr. Clarke and Mr. Whiston (1729).

=== Revised prayer book ===
By 1724, Clarke had been pressured to retract his Nontrinitarian views publicly. However, he maintained these beliefs in private. That year, Clarke privately altered his copy of the 1662 Book of Common Prayer, deleting Trinitarian formulae and the Athanasian Creed. The work went unpublished, though copies were made and his son later donated the original manuscript to the British Library. Theophilus Lindsey eventually encountered a copy in the possession of John Disney. Lindsey, using Clarke's work as his basis, published his own Unitarian prayer book revision in 1774 and began using it with his Essex Street Chapel congregation. In 1785, Lindsey's work was further adapted by James Freeman for use at King's Chapel in Boston, where a ninth edition version is still used.

== Correspondence with Leibniz ==
In 1715 and 1716 Clarke had a discussion with Gottfried Leibniz on the principles of natural philosophy and religion, which was cut short when Leibniz died. A collection of the papers which passed between them was published in 1717.

== Later life and death ==
In 1719 Clarke was presented by Nicholas Lechmere, 1st Baron Lechmere, to the mastership of Wigston's hospital in Leicester. In 1727, on the death of Sir Isaac Newton, he was offered by the court the post of Master of the Mint, worth on an average from £1200 to £1500 a year. He refused the position.

On Sunday 11 May 1729, when going out to preach before the judges at Serjeants' Inn, Clarke had a sudden illness. It caused his death on the Saturday following, in London. His funeral was held at St James's on Thursday, 22 May.

== Works ==
=== Translations ===
Clarke published a Latin version of the Traité de physique of Jacques Rohault (1617(?)-1672) with notes, which he finished before he was twenty-two. The system of Rohault was based on Cartesian principles, and was previously known only through the medium of a crude Latin version. Clarke's translation (1697) continued to be used as a text-book in the university till supplanted by the treatises of Newton. Four editions were issued, the last being that of 1718. It was translated into English in 1723 by his younger brother John, dean of Salisbury.

In 1706 Clarke translated Newton's Opticks into Latin, for which the author presented him with £500. In 1709, at the request of the author, Clarke revised William Whiston's English translation of the Apostolical Constitutions. In 1712 he published an annotated edition of Caesar's Commentaries, with engravings, dedicated to John Churchill, 1st Duke of Marlborough.

In 1729 he published the first twelve books of Homer's Iliad. This edition, dedicated to William Augustus, Duke of Cumberland, was praised by Bishop Hoadly. Three years after his death appeared also the last twelve books of the Iliad, published by his son Samuel Clarke, the first three of these books and part of the fourth having, as he states, been revised and annotated by his father.

=== Other works ===
In 1699 Clarke published two treatises: Three Practical Essays on Baptism, Confirmation and Repentance and Some Reflections on that part of a book called Amyntor, or a Defence of Milton's Life, which relates to the Writings of the Primitive Fathers, and the Canon of the New Testament. In 1701 he published A Paraphrase upon the Gospel of St Matthew, which was followed, in 1702, by the Paraphrases upon the Gospels of St Mark and St Luke, and soon afterwards by a third volume upon St John. They were subsequently printed together in two volumes and passed through several editions.

In 1724 Clarke published seventeen sermons, eleven of which had not before been printed. In 1728 was published "A Letter from Dr Clarke to Benjamin Hoadly, F.R.S., occasioned by the controversy relating to the Proportion of Velocity and Force in Bodies in Motion," printed in the Philosophical Transactions.

Soon after his death his brother, Dr John Clarke, published, from his original manuscripts, An Exposition of the Church Catechism, and ten volumes of sermons. The Exposition is composed of the lectures which he read on Thursday mornings, for some months in the year, at St James's church. He revised them, and left them ready for the press.

== Moral views ==
Clarke's moral fitness theory is formulated on the analogy of mathematics. He held that in relation to the will things possess an objective fitness similar to the mutual consistency of things in the physical universe. This fitness God has given to actions, as he has given laws to Nature; and the fitness is as immutable as the laws. The theory was criticized by Théodore Simon Jouffroy, Amédée Jacques, Sir James Mackintosh, Thomas Brown, Francis Hutcheson, and others, but substantially defended by John Balguy against Hutcheson's sentimentalist case against moral rationalism. A similar form of moral rationalism is developed by the Cambridge Platonist Ralph Cudworth.

== Influence ==
Clarke had an influence on Enlightenment philosophers including Lord Monboddo. He left notes on the Book of Common Prayer. These became the source of Theophilus Lindsey's The Book of Common Prayer Reformed According to the Plan of the Late Dr. Samuel Clarke 1774, and other liturgical works.

== Family ==
Clarke married his first cousin Katherine Lockwood (d. 1753), daughter of the Rev. Mr. Lockwood of Little Massingham, Norfolk and Katherine Clarke in St Margaret's Church, Burnham Norton, Norfolk on 17 October 1700. They had seven children, of whom five survived him; only three children are mentioned in their mother's will, Samuel, Dorothy and Katherine. Clarke's surviving son Samuel Clarke (b. 1710) died without issue sometime in 1778. His will was proved by his cousin Frances Clarke, one of the daughters of his uncle John Clarke on 13 May 1778.

== Writings ==
- A Demonstration of the Being and Attributes of God: and Other Writings, edited by Ezio Vailati, Cambridge: Cambridge University Press, 1998.
- G. W. Leibniz and Samuel Clarke. Correspondence, edited by Roger Ariew, Indianapolis: Hackett, 2000.

== See also ==
- Axiom of equity
- Thomas Chubb

== Notes ==
Attribution
