= Vestments controversy =

English Reformation controversy

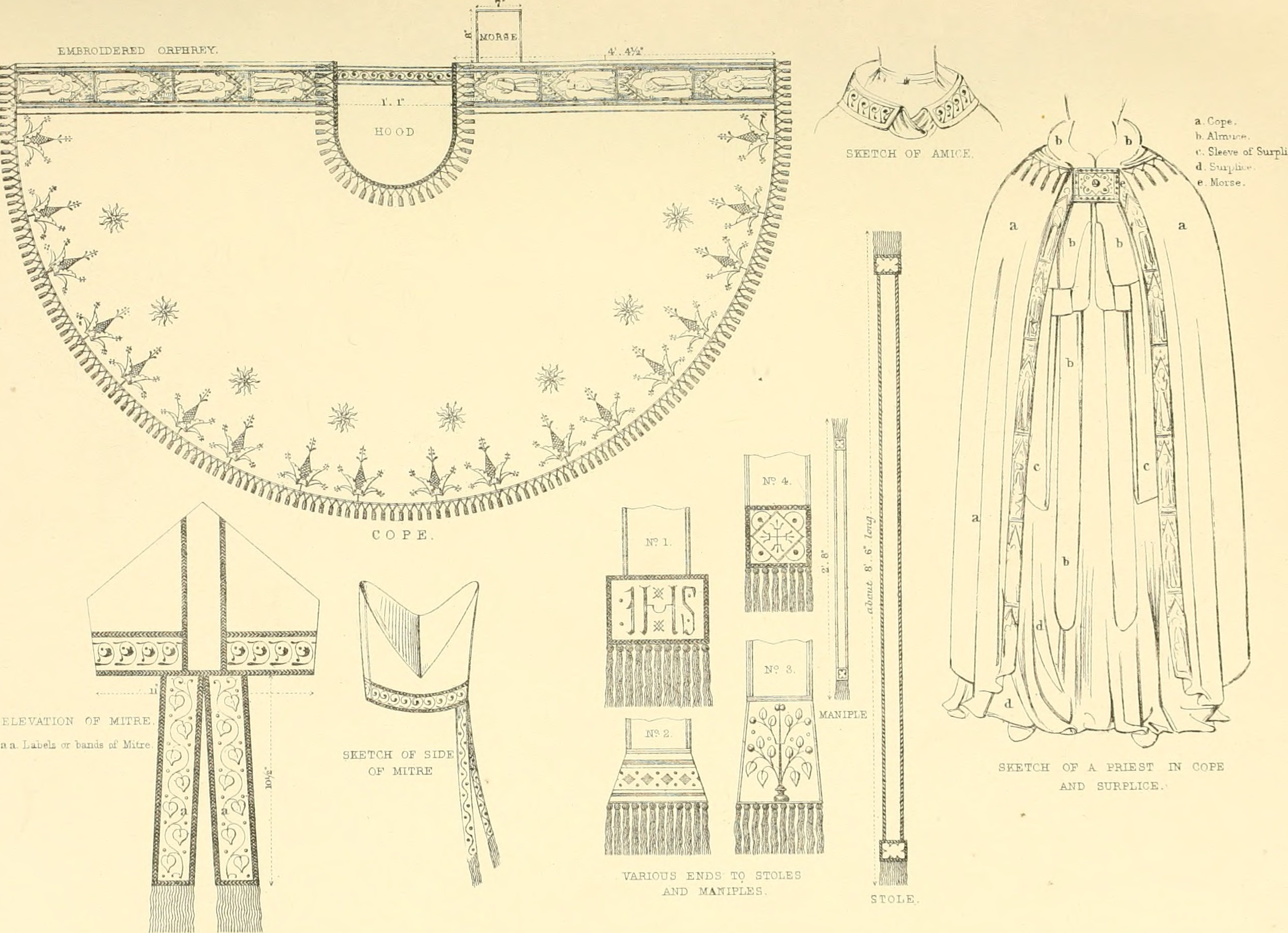
Church of England vestments depicted in the late 19th century

The vestments controversy or vestarian controversy arose in the English Reformation, ostensibly concerning vestments or clerical dress. Initiated by John Hooper's rejection of clerical vestments in the Church of England under Edward VI as described by the 1549 Book of Common Prayer and 1550 ordinal, it was later revived under Elizabeth I. It revealed concerns within the Church of England over ecclesiastical identity, doctrine and church practices.

== Formulations ==
The vestments controversy is also known as the vestiarian crisis or, especially in its Elizabethan manifestation, the edification crisis. The latter term arose from the debate over whether or not vestments, if they are deemed a "thing indifferent" (adiaphoron), should be tolerated if they are "edifying"—that is, beneficial. Their indifference and beneficial status were key points of disagreement. The term edification comes from 1 Corinthians 14:26, which reads in the 1535 Coverdale Bible: "How is it then brethren? Whan ye come together, euery one hath a psalme, hath doctryne, hath a tunge, hath a reuelacion, hath an interpretacion. Let all be done to edifyenge."

As Norman Jones writes:

Edification became one of the chief duties of the supreme head or governor of the church of England [i.e. the monarch] and was enshrined in the laws which enforced Protestantism in the reigns of Edward VI and Elizabeth. Combined with the belief that most of the externals of worship were adiaphora, the concept of edification justified and circumscribed the monarch's right to intervene in the church's affairs.

— Jones 1984, p. 175

In section 13 of the Act of Uniformity 1559, if acting on the advice of her commissioners for ecclesiastical causes or the metropolitan, the monarch had the authority "to ordeyne and publishe suche further Ceremonies or rites as maye bee most meet for the advancement of Goddes Glorye, the edifieing of his church and the due Reverance of Christes holye mistries and Sacramentes. [sic]" (Note: Please note the foregoing quotation is verbatim, and the spellings are sixteenth-century English. "Goddes" is the singular masculine possessive, spelled "God's" today, not "goddess.")

== During the reign of Edward VI ==
John Hooper, having been exiled during King Henry's reign, returned to England in 1548 from the churches in Zürich that had been reformed by Zwingli and Bullinger in a highly iconoclastic fashion. Hooper became a leading Protestant reformer in England under the patronage of Edward Seymour, 1st Duke of Somerset and subsequently John Dudley, 1st Duke of Northumberland. Hooper's fortunes were unchanged when power shifted from Somerset to Northumberland, since Northumberland also favoured Hooper's reformist agenda.

When Hooper was invited to give a series of Lenten sermons before the king in February 1550, he spoke against the 1549 ordinal whose oath mentioned "all saints" and required newly elected bishops and those attending the ordination ceremony to wear a cope and surplice. In Hooper's view, these requirements were vestiges of Judaism and Roman Catholicism, which had no biblical warrant for authentic Christians since they were not used in the early Christian church.

Summoned to answer to the Privy Council and archbishop—who were primarily concerned with Hooper's willingness to accept the royal supremacy, which was also part of the oath for newly ordained clergy—Hooper evidently made sufficient reassurances, as he was soon appointed to the bishopric of Gloucester. Hooper declined the office, however, because of the required vestments and oath by the saints. This action violated the 1549 Act of Uniformity, which made declining the appointment without good cause, a crime against the king and state, so Hooper was called to answer to the king. The king accepted Hooper's position, but the Privy Council did not. Called before them on 15 May 1550, a compromise was reached. Vestments were to be considered a matter of adiaphora, or Res Indifferentes ("things indifferent", as opposed to an article of faith), and Hooper could be ordained without them at his discretion, but he must allow others to wear them.

Hooper passed confirmation of the new office again before the king and council on 20 July 1550, when the issue was raised again, and Archbishop Thomas Cranmer was instructed that Hooper was not to be charged "with an oath burdensome to his conscience". Cranmer, however, assigned Nicholas Ridley, Bishop of London, to perform the consecration, and Ridley refused to do anything but follow the form of the ordinal as it had been prescribed by the Parliament of England.

A reformist himself, and not always a strict follower of the ordinal, Ridley, it seems likely, had some particular objection to Hooper. It has been suggested that Henrician exiles like Hooper, who had experienced some of the more radically reformed churches on the continent, were at odds with English clergy who had accepted and never left the established church. John Henry Primus also notes that on 24 July 1550, the day after receiving instructions for Hooper's unique consecration, the church of the Austin Friars in London had been granted for use as a Stranger church with the freedom to employ their own rites and ceremonies. This development—the use of a London church virtually outside Ridley's jurisdiction—was one that Hooper had had a hand in.

The Privy Council reiterated its position, and Ridley responded in person, agreeing that vestments are indifferent but making a compelling argument that the monarch may require indifferent things without exception. The council became divided in opinion, and the issue dragged on for months without resolution. Hooper now insisted that vestments were not indifferent, since they obscured the priesthood of Christ by encouraging hypocrisy and superstition. Warwick disagreed, emphasising that the king must be obeyed in things indifferent, and he pointed to St Paul's concessions to Jewish traditions in the early church. Finally, an acrimonious debate with Ridley went against Hooper. Ridley's position centred on maintaining order and authority; not the vestments themselves, Hooper's primary concern.

Biblical texts cited in this and subsequent debates—and the ways in which they were interpreted—came to be defining features of conservative and puritan Protestant discourse. They were echoed elsewhere, such as the famous glosses of the Geneva Bible.

=== Hooper–Ridley debate ===
In a Latin letter dated 3 October 1550, Hooper laid out his argument contra usum vestium. (Note: The letter exists but with some parts lost.) He argued that vestments should not be used as they are not indifferent, nor is their use supported by scripture. He contends that church practices must either have express biblical support or be things indifferent, approval for which is implied by scripture. He then all but excludes the possibility of anything being indifferent in the four conditions he sets:

1) An indifferent thing has either an express justification in scripture or is implied by it, finding its origin and foundation in scripture.

Hooper cites Romans 14:23b (whatsoever is not of faith is sin), Romans 10:17 (faith cometh from hearing, and hearing by the word of God), and Matthew 15:13 (every plant not planted by God will be rooted up) to argue that indifferent things must be done in faith, and since what cannot be proved from scripture is not of faith, indifferent things must be proved from scripture, which is both necessary and sufficient authority, as opposed to tradition. He maintains that priestly garb distinguishing clergy from laity is not indicated by scripture; there is no mention of it in the New Testament as being in use in the early church, and the use of priestly clothing in the Old Testament is a Hebrew practice, a type or foreshadowing that finds its antitype in Christ, who abolishes the old order and recognises the spiritual equality, or priesthood, of all Christians. The historicity of these claims is supported by reference to Polydore Vergil's De Inventoribus Rerum.

In response, Ridley rejected Hooper's insistence on biblical origins and countered Hooper's interpretations of his chosen biblical texts. He pointed out that many non-controversial practices are not mentioned or implied in scripture. Ridley denied that early church practices are normative for the present situation, and he linked such arguments with the Anabaptists. Ridley joked that Hooper's reference to Christ's nakedness on the cross is as insignificant as the clothing King Herod put Christ in and "a jolly argument" for the Adamites.

Ridley did not dispute Hooper's main typological argument, but neither did he accept that vestments are necessarily or exclusively identified with Israel and the Roman Catholic Church. On Hooper's point about the priesthood of all believers, Ridley said it does not follow from this doctrine that all Christians must wear the same clothes.

2) An indifferent thing must be left to individual discretion; if required, it is no longer indifferent.

For Ridley, on matters of indifference, one must defer conscience to the authorities of the church, or else "thou showest thyself a disordered person, disobedient, as [a] contemner of lawful authority, and a wounder of thy weak brother his conscience." For him, the debate was finally about legitimate authority, not the merits and demerits of vestments themselves. He contended that it is only accidental that the compulsory ceases to be indifferent; the degeneration of a practice into non-indifference can be corrected without throwing out the practice. Things are not, "because they have been abused, to be taken away, but to be reformed and amended, and so kept still."

3) An indifferent thing's usefulness must be demonstrated and not introduced arbitrarily.

For this point, Hooper cites 1 Corinthians 14 and 2 Corinthians 13. As it contradicts the first point above, Primus contends that Hooper must now refer to indifferent things in the church and earlier meant indifferent things in general, in the abstract. The apparent contradiction was seized by Ridley and undoubtedly hurt Hooper's case with the council.

4) Indifferent things must be introduced into the church with apostolic and evangelical lenity, not violent tyranny.

Ridley warned Hooper of the implications of an attack on English ecclesiastical and civil authority and of the consequences of radical individual liberties, while also reminding him that it was Parliament that established the "Book of Common Prayer in the church of England".

=== Outcome of the Edwardian controversy ===
Hooper accepted neither Ridley's rejoinder, nor the offer of a compromise. Heinrich Bullinger, Pietro Martire Vermigli, and Martin Bucer, while agreeing with Hooper's views, ceased to support him; only John a Lasco remained an ally.

Some time in mid-December 1550, Hooper was put under house arrest, during which time he wrote and published A godly Confession and protestacion of the Christian faith, an effort at self-vindication in the form of 21 articles in a general confession of faith. In it, Hooper denounced Anabaptism and emphasised obedience to civil authorities. Because of this publication, his persistent nonconformism, and violations of the terms of his house arrest, Hooper was placed in Thomas Cranmer's custody at Lambeth Palace for two weeks by the Privy Council on 13 January 1551. During this time, Peter Martyr visited Hooper three times in attempts to persuade him to conform but attributed his failure to another visitor, probably John a Lasco, who encouraged the opposite.

Hooper was then sent to Fleet Prison by the council, who made that decision on 27 January. John Calvin and Bullinger both wrote to him at this time; Calvin counselled Hooper that the issue was not worth such resistance. On 15 February, Hooper submitted to consecration in vestments in a letter to Cranmer, was consecrated Bishop of Gloucester on 8 March 1551, and shortly thereafter, preached before the king in vestments. The 1552 revised Prayer Book omitted the vestments rubrics that had been the occasion for the controversy.

== Vestments among the Marian exiles ==
In controversy among the Marian exiles, principally those in Frankfurt, church order and liturgy were the main issues of contention, though vestments were related and debated in their own right. At several points, opponents of the English prayerbook in John Knox's group maligned it by reference to John Hooper's persecution under the Edwardian prayer book and vestments regulations. On the other side, that of Richard Cox, the martyrdom of Hooper and others was blamed on Knox's polemic against Mary I, Philip II and the emperor, Charles V.

By 1558, even the supporters of the prayer book had abandoned the Edwardian regulations on clerical dress. All the Marian exiles—even the leading promoters of the English prayer book such as Cox–had given up the use of vestments by the time of their return to England under Elizabeth I, according to John Strype's Annals of the Reformation. This seeming unity did not last.

During the troubles in the English exile congregation in Frankfurt, some people shifted sides that would shift again upon their return to England, and certainly, there was no direct correlation between one's views on church order and one's views on clerical dress. Nevertheless, there is a general pattern wherein the members of the "prayer book party" were favoured for high appointments in the church under Elizabeth I that required conformity on vestments, as opposed to the exiles who departed from the order of the English national church in favour of the more international, continental, reformed order. Occupying many lower positions in the Elizabethan church, this latter group grew during the exile period and produced many of the leaders of the Elizabethan anti-vestments faction. As deans, prebends, and parish priests, they were freer to disobey openly, en masse, the requirements for clerical dress.

Notably, some of the leaders of the Elizabethan anti-vestments campaign spent time in Calvin's Geneva, many of them following the successful takeover of the Frankfurt congregation and ouster of John Knox by the pro-prayerbook group. (Note: For example; Lawrence Humphrey, Thomas Sampson, William Whittingham, Anthony Gilby, Thomas Lever, and others) In Geneva, these men were immersed in a reformed community that had no place for vestments at all, whereas the exiles who became Elizabethan bishops (and thus had to accept the use of vestments) never visited Geneva except for James Pilkington, Thomas Bentham and John Scory. Yet these three, or at least Pilkington for certain, were hostile toward vestments and sympathetic to nonconformists under Elizabeth I, though Cox and Grindal also showed such sympathies.

== During the reign of Elizabeth I ==
Elizabeth I sought unity with her first parliament in 1559 and did not encourage nonconformity. Under her Act of Uniformity 1559, backed by the Act of Supremacy, the 1552 Prayer Book was to be the model for ecclesiastical use, but with a stance on vestments that went back to the second year of Edward VI's reign. The alb, cope and chasuble were all to be brought back into use, where some exiles had even abandoned the surplice. The queen assumed direct control over these rules and all ceremonies or rites.

Anticipating further problems with vestments, Thomas Sampson corresponded with Peter Martyr Vermigli on the matter. Martyr's advice, along with Bullinger's, was to accept vestments but also to preach against them. However, Sampson, Lever, and others were unsatisfied with the lack of such protest from Elizabeth's bishops, such as Cox, Edmund Grindal, Pilkington, Sandys, Jewel, and Parkhurst, even though some, like Sandys and Grindal, were reluctant conformists with nonconformist sympathies. Archbishop Parker, consecrated by the anti-vestiarian Miles Coverdale, was also a major source of discontent.

The Convocation of 1563 saw the victory of a conservative position over some proposed anti-vestiarian revisions to the Prayer Book. Thirty-four delegates to the convocation, including many Marian exiles, brought up seven articles altering the Prayer Book. The articles were subsequently reshaped and reduced to six; they failed to be sent to the Upper House by just one vote, with abstention of some of the sponsors of the original draft. The queen backed Parker over uniformity along the lines of the 1559 Prayer Book.

=== London non-conformists ===
On 20 March 1563, an appeal was made to the ecclesiastical commissioners (Note: Parker, Cox, Grindal, Robert Horne, and Edmund Guest) by twenty petitioners to exempt them from the use of vestments. These included a number of prominent clergy, mainly in the diocese of London, whose bishop, Grindal, had packed his see with former exiles and activists for reform. (Note: Such as Coverdale, Whittingham, Sampson, Humphrey, Lever, Edmund Freke, Thomas Cole, James Calfhill, Richard Alvey, Percival Wiburn, John Foxe, Richard Allen, John Philpot, John Mullins, Alexander Nowell, John Gough, William Porrage, Robert Crowley, Richard Laughern, and Nicholas Kerville.) The petition was approved by all the commissioners except Parker and Guest, who rejected it.

Sampson and Humphrey were then the first nonconformist leaders to be targeted by Parker. Sampson's quick deprivation in 1565 came because he was directly under the queen's authority. Humphrey, under the jurisdiction of Robert Horne, the Bishop of Winchester, was able to return to his position as president of Magdalen College, Oxford, and was later offered by Horne a benefice in Sarum, though with Sarum's bishop, Jewel, opposing this. At this time, Bullinger was counselling Horne with a position more tolerant of vestments, while nonconformist agitation was taking place among students at St John's College, Cambridge.

March 1566 brought the peak of enforcement against nonconformity, with the Diocese of London targeted as an example, despite Parker's expectation that it would leave many churches "destitute for service this Easter, and that many [clergy] will forsake their livings, and live at printing, teaching their children, or otherwise as they can." The London clergy were assembled at Lambeth Palace. Parker had requested but failed to gain the attendance of William Cecil, Lord Keeper Nicholas Bacon, and the Lord Marquess of Northampton, so it was left to Parker himself, bishop Grindal, the dean of Westminster, and some canonists. One former nonconformist, Robert Cole, was stood before the assembly in full canonical habit. There was no discussion. The ultimatum was issued that the clergy would appear as Cole—in a square cap, gown, tippet, and surplice. They would "inviolably observe the rubric of the Book of Common Prayer, and the Queen majesty's injunctions: and the Book of Convocation." The clergy were ordered to commit themselves on the spot, in writing, with only the words volo or nolo. Sixty-one subscribed; thirty-seven did not and were immediately suspended with their livings sequestered. A three-month grace period was given for these clergy to change their minds before they would be fully deprived.

The deprivations were to be carried out under the authority of Parker's Advertisements, which he had just published as a revised form of the original articles defining ecclesiastical conformity. (Note: The full title is Advertisements partly for due order in the publique administration of common prayers and usinge the holy sacramentes, and partly for the apparrell of all persons ecclesiasticall, by vertue of the Queenes maiesties letters commaunding the same.) Parker had not obtained the crown's authorisation for this mandate, however, though he increasingly relied on the authority of the state. The nonconformist reaction was a vociferous assertion of their persecuted status, with some displays of disobedience. John Stow records in his Memoranda that in most parishes, the sextons did not change the service if they had conducted it without vestments previously: "The clergy themselves did service in the forbidden gowns and cloaks, and preached violently against the order taken by the Queen in Council, not forbearing to censure the bishops for yielding their consent to it."The term "Puritan" was first recorded at this time as term of abuse for such nonconformists.

=== Reactions of protest in 1566 ===
One of those who signed nolo and a former Marian exile, Robert Crowley, vicar of St Giles-without-Cripplegate, instigated the first open protest. After many episodes, he was arrested.

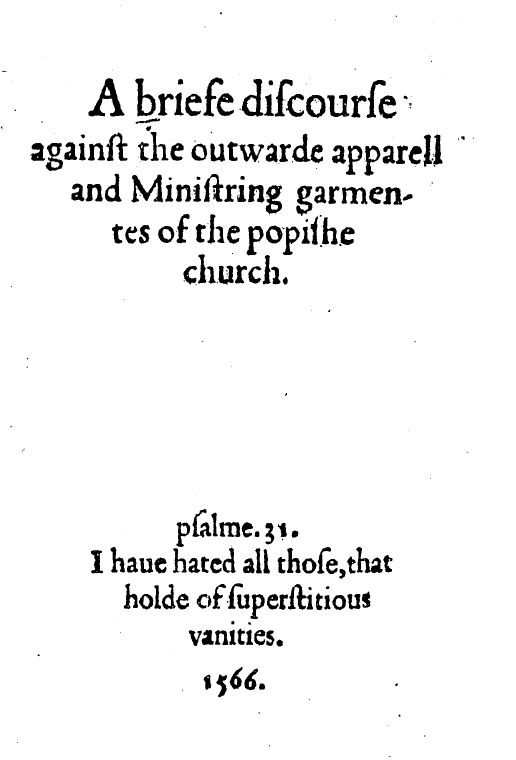
Title page to A Briefe Discourse Against the Outwarde Apparel of the Popishe Church (1566)

While under arrest, Crowley published three editions (including one in Emden) of A Briefe Discourse Against the Outwarde Apparel of the Popishe Church (1566). Patrick Collinson has called this "the earliest puritan manifesto". The title page quotes from Psalm 31; intriguingly, it is closest to the English of the Bishops' Bible (1568): "I have hated all those that holde of superstitious vanities". (See image at right.)

As his title suggests, Crowley inveighed relentlessly against the evil of vestments and stressed the direct responsibility of preachers to God rather than to men. Moreover, he stressed God's inevitable vengeance against the use of vestments and the responsibility of rulers for tolerance of such "vain toys".

A response to Crowley that is thought to have been commissioned by and/or written by Parker, also in 1566, notes how Crowley's argument challenges the royal supremacy and was tantamount to rebellion.

Also in 1566, a letter on vestments from Bullinger to Humphrey and Sampson dated 1 May of that year (in response to questions they had posed to him) was published. It was taken as a decisive defence of conformity since it matched the position of the Marian exiles who had accepted bishoprics while hoping for future reforms. Bullinger was incensed by the publication and effect of his letter. It elicited a further nonconformist response in The judgement of the Reverend Father Master Henry Bullinger, Pastor of the church of Zurick, in certeyne matters of religion, beinge in controversy in many countreys, even where as the Gospel is taught. Based on Bullinger's Decades, this tract tried to muster support for nonconformity on vestments from five points not directly related to but underlying that issue: 1) the corrupt nature of traditions and the primacy of scripture, 2) the equality of clergy, 3) the non-exclusive power of the bishops to ordain ministers, 4) the limited scope of the authority of civil magistrates, and 5) the sole headship of Christ in the church—a re-emphasis of the second point.

Two other nonconformist tracts appeared, both deploying established authorities such as St Ambrose, Theophilactus of Bulgaria, Erasmus, Bucer, Martyr, John Epinus of Hamburg, Matthias Flacius Illyricus, Philipp Melanchthon, a Lasco, Bullinger, Wolfgang Musculus of Bern, and Rodolph Gualter. These were The mynd and exposition of that excellente learned man Martyn Bucer, upon these wordes of S. Matthew: woo be to the wordle bycause of offences. Matth. xviii (1566) and The Fortress of Fathers, ernestlie defending the puritie of Religion and Ceremonies, by the trew exposition of certaine places of Scripture: against such as wold bring an Abuse of Idol stouff, and of thinges indifferent, and do appoinct th' authority of Princes and Prelates larger than the truth is (1566). New developments in these pamphlets are the use of arguments against English prelates that were originally aimed at the Roman church, the labelling of the conformist opposition as Antichrist, and advocacy for separation from such evil. Such sharp material militates in favour of taking 1566 as beginning of English Presbyterianism, at least in a theoretical sense.

A conformist response answered in the affirmative the question posed in its title, Whether it be mortall sinne to transgresse civil lawes, which be the commaundementes of civill Magistrates (1566). This text also drew on Melanchthon, Bullinger, Gualter, Bucer, and Martyr. Eight letters between ecclesiastics from the reign of Edward VI to Elizabeth were included, and a no longer extant tract thought to have been written by Cox or Jewel is discussed at some length. Following suit, a non-conformist collection of letters (To my lovynge brethren that is troublyd about the popishe aparrell, two short and comfortable Epistels) by Anthony Gilby and James Pilkington was published in Emden by E. Van der Erve. The collection begins with an undated, unaddressed letter, but it appears in another tract attributed to Gilby (A pleasaunt Dialogue, betweene a Souldior of Barwicke and an English Chaplaine), where it is dated May 10, 1566, and is addressed to Miles Coverdale, William Turner, Whittingham, Sampson, Humphrey, Lever, Crowley, "and others that labour to roote out the weedes of Poperie." The date of the letter is not certain however, since it also appears under Gilby's name, with the date 1570 in a collection called A parte of a register..., which was printed in Edinburgh by Robert Waldegrave in 1593 but was then suppressed.

Regarding Gilby's dialogue, the full title reads: A pleasaunt Dialogue, betweene a Souldior of Barwicke and an English Chaplaine; wherein are largely handled and laide open, such reasons as are brought in for maintenaunce of Popishe Traditions in our English Church, &c. Togither with a letter of the same Author, placed before this booke in way of a Preface. 1581. (This is the only extant version of this tract, barring a later 1642 edition, but it was probably printed earlier as well.) A second title inside the book reads: "A pleasaunt Dialogue, conteining a large discourse betweene a Souldier of Barwick and an English Chaplain, who of a late Souldier was made a Parson, and had gotten a pluralitie of Benefices, and yet had but one eye, and no learning: but he was priestly apparailed in al points, and stoutly maintained his Popish attire, by the authoritie of a booke lately written against London Ministers." In the dialogue, a soldier, Miles Monopodios, is set against Sir Bernarde Blynkarde, who is a corrupt pluralist minister, a former soldier and friend of Monopodios, and a wearer of vestments. In the process of correcting Blynkarde, Monopodios lists 100 vestiges of popery in the English church, including 24 unbiblical "offices".

== Emergence of separatism and Presbyterianism ==
In the summer and autumn of 1566, conformists and nonconformists exchanged letters with continental reformers. The nonconformists looked to Geneva for support, but no real opportunity for change was coming, and the anti-vestments faction of the emerging Puritan element split into separatist and anti-separatist wings. Public debate turned into more and less furtive acts of direct disobedience, with the exception of a brief recurrence of the original issue in communications between Horne and Bullinger, and between Jerome Zanchi and the Queen, though the latter correspondence, held by Grindal, was never delivered.

Despite the appearance of a victory for Parker, Brett Usher has argued that national uniformity was an impossible goal due to Parker's political and jurisdictional limitations. In Usher's view, the anti-vestments faction did not perceive a defeat in 1566, and it was not until the Presbyterian movements of the next two decades (which Parker's crackdown helped to provoke) that relations really changed between the state and high-ranking clergy who still sought further changes in the church.

After 1566, the most radical figures, the separatists, went underground to organise and lead illegal, secret congregations. One of the first official discoveries of a separatist congregation came on 19 June 1567, in Plumber's Hall in London. Similar discoveries followed, with the separatists usually claiming they were not separatists but the body of the true church. Anti-vestiarians like Humphrey and Sampson who rejected this movement were called "semi-papists" by the new radical vanguard.

Others opposed to vestments elected to try to change the shape of the church and its authority along presbyterian lines in the early 1570s, and in this, they had continental support. Calvin's successor, Theodore Beza, had written in implicit support of the presbyterian system in 1566 in a letter to Grindal. This letter was acquired by pro-presbyterian Puritans and was published in 1572 with Thomas Wilcox and John Field's Admonition to Parliament, the foundational manifesto and first public manifestation of English Presbyterianism. (The ensuing controversy is sometimes referred to as the Admonition Controversy.) Also included in the Admonition was another 1566 letter from Gualter to Bishop Parkhurst that was seen as lending support to the nonconformists. By some accounts, Gilby, Sampson, and Lever were indirectly involved in this publication, but the ensuing controversy centred on another public literary exchange between Archbishop John Whitgift and Thomas Cartwright, wherein Whitgift conceded the non-indifference of vestments but insisted on the authority of the church to require them. The issue became deadlocked and explicitly focused on the nature, authority, and legitimacy of the church polity. A primarily liturgical matter had developed into a wholly governmental one. The Separatist Puritans, led by Cartwright, persisted in their rejection of vestments, but the larger political issues had effectively eclipsed it.

In 1574–75, A Brieff discours off the troubles begonne at Franckford ... A.D. 1554 was published. This was a pro-presbyterian historical narrative of the disputes among the Marian exiles in Frankfurt twenty years earlier "about the Booke off common prayer and Ceremonies ... in the which ... the gentle reader shall see the very originall and beginninge off all the contention that hathe byn and what was the cause off the same." This introductory advertisement on the title page is followed by Mark 4:22–23: "For there is nothinge hid that shall not be opened neither is there a secreat that it shall come to light yff anie man have eares to heare let him heare."

== See also ==
- Idolatry in Christianity
- Elizabethan Religious Settlement
- Liturgical struggle, a similar, contemporaneous controversy in Sweden
- Ritualism in the Church of England
