= David Whitehead (priest) =

David Whitehead (also Whitehet and Whithead) (1492?–1571) was an English evangelical priest, a Marian exile and author.

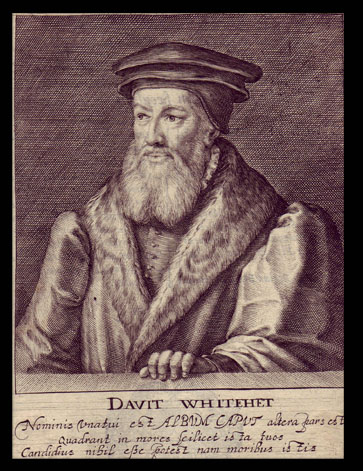
David Whitehead.

== Early life ==
Born about 1492, he was a native of Hampshire; his contemporary Hugh Whitehead (died 1551), with whom David Whitehead has sometimes been confused, was from the County Durham area.

David Whitehead is said to have been educated at Brasenose College, Oxford or All Souls College, Oxford, but his name does not appear in the registers. He was tutor to Charles Brandon, 1st Duke of Suffolk, who died in 1551. During the winter of 1549–50 Whitehead, Thomas Lever and Roger Hutchinson endeavoured to convert Joan Bocher from her heresies. On Brandon's death Whitehead retained a prominent position as chaplain to his widow, Catherine Brandon, Duchess of Suffolk. On 25 November 1551 he took part in the discussion on transubstantiation at William Cecil's house. At this point he was positioned with the Cambridge-dominated evangelical faction at court, with John Cheke and others.

In 1552 Thomas Cranmer described him as "Mr. Whitehead of Hadley"; and on 25 August suggested him to Cecil as a candidate for the vacant Archbishop of Armagh. Whitehead, however, refused the appointment, and Hugh Goodacre became archbishop.

== In exile ==
Soon after Queen Mary's accession Whitehead left for the continent; he was one of the 175 who sailed with Jan Łaski from Gravesend on 17 September 1553. Whitehead was in the smaller vessel which reached Copenhagen on 3 November; there the exiles were taken for Anabaptists, and soon expelled by order of the king on their refusing to subscribe to the Lutheran confession. They then made their way to Rostock, where Whitehead pleaded their cause before the magistrates, whose Lutheran requirements they failed to satisfy, and they were compelled to leave in January. A similar fate befell them at Wismar, Lübeck, and Hamburg, but they found a refuge at Emden in March 1554.

Meanwhile, an attempt was being made to found a church of English exiles at Frankfurt, and on 2 August 1554 an invitation was sent to Whitehead and other exiles at Emden to join it. Whitehead went there on 24 October, and took over the congregation for a time, as John Knox wrote. Whitehead was one of those who wished to retain the use of the English Prayer Book of 1552, and in the debates at Frankfurt he took the side of Richard Cox against Knox. After the expulsion of Knox (26 March 1555) Whitehead was chosen pastor of the congregation. On 20 September he and his colleagues wrote a letter to John Calvin to justify their proceedings against Knox, and repudiating the charge of too rigorous adherence to the prayer-book; their ceremonies, they pleaded, were really very few, and they went on to attack Knox's Admonition as inflammatory. In February 1555–6 Whitehead resigned his pastorate, being succeeded on 1 March by Robert Horne; the cause is said to have been his disappointment at not being made lecturer in divinity in succession to Bartholomew Traheron. He remained, however, at Frankfurt, sharing a house with Richard Alvey, and signing a letter to Heinrich Bullinger on 27 September 1557.

== Under Elizabeth ==
On Elizabeth I's accession Whitehead returned to England, preaching before the queen on 15 February 1559, taking part in the Westminster disputation with the Roman Catholic bishops on 3 April, and serving as a visitor of Oxford University, and on the commission for revising the liturgy. He is said by biographers to have had the first refusal of the Archbishopric of Canterbury, and he also declined the Mastership of the Savoy. On 17 September 1561 he wrote to Cecil acknowledging his obligations to him, but refusing the living he offered.

Whitehead, according to John Whitgift, deplored the excesses of some ministers, but his own leanings were Puritan. On 24 March 1564 he was sequestered for refusing to subscribe. Francis Bacon stated that he opposed episcopacy, and related the anecdote that the queen once said to him "I like thee better because thou livest unmarried", to which Whitehead replied "In troth, madame, I like you the worse for the same cause". Richard Hilles, however, in announcing Whitehead's death in June 1571, said that Whitehead had lived about seven years a widower, but married a young widow when about eighty.

== Works ==
Whitehead's writings, with the exception of discourses printed in William Whittingham's Brieff Discours of Troubles at Frankfort (1575), have not been traced. Henry Billingsley, who published the first English edition of Euclid's Elements, is thought to have been tutored in mathematics by Whitehead at Oxford; and it has been argued on the basis of an Oxford tradition that Whitehead played a large part in the translation. This story passed from Robert Barnes in Oxford to Thomas Allen; and from Allen to Brian Twyne. In Anthony Wood a version of this story has "Friar Whitehead" the source for Billingsley's work. There is also a tradition that Whitehead was earlier in life an Augustinian friar. In any case the book appeared in 1570, and Whitehead died in 1571. Billingley's first translation of 1568, from Peter Martyr Vermigli, appeared with acknowledgement to Whitehead.
