= Convocation of 1563 =

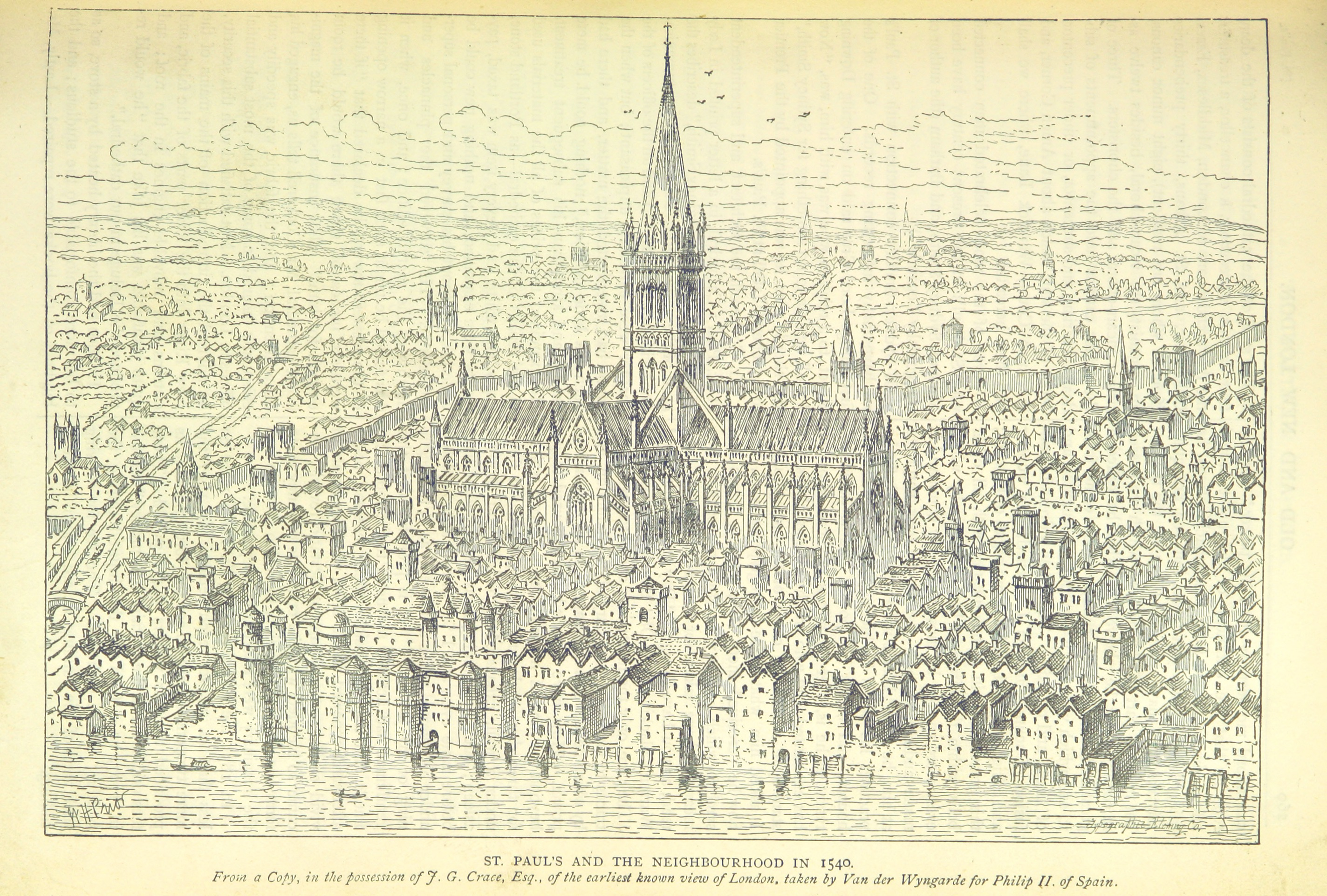
Old St Paul's Cathedral, London, view as in 1540

The Convocation of 1563 was a significant gathering of English and Welsh clerics that consolidated the Elizabethan religious settlement, and brought the Thirty-Nine Articles close to their final form (which dates from 1571). It was, more accurately, the Convocation of 1562/3 of the province of Canterbury, beginning in January 1562 (Old Style).

== Summary ==
Matthew Parker who was Archbishop of Canterbury had prepared documents outlining further reform in the Church of England, as had other bishops. A more thorough-going reform agenda was supported by over 30 of the participants. A compromise version, the "six articles", was narrowly defeated on a vote. The result was that the momentum for reform of the Church by its constitutional procedures was halted. Parker steered the outcome towards the via media. "Swiss-inspired reformists" were headed off.

The Convocation restored the position of the Thirty-Nine Articles in the Church of England. More accurately said, the Forty-Two Articles of Edward VI were reduced to a draft at this point, which was widely supported, and eventually enforced after 1571. There were further proposals from reformers, in particular on canon law and liturgy, some of which originated from a group among the bishops. These, however, proved contentious, and did not pass. Subsequent contestation of the same issues made some of them a matter of authority.

Collinson comments that

Moves to improve the settlement in the convocation of 1563 were led by the bishops rather than by 'Puritans' in the lower house [...]

Dawley writes that probably the surprise of the Convocation

[...] was not the amount of support given to the Precisians but the unexpected extent of loyalty to the existing regulations,

"Precisian" being the term used by Parker for his opponents on the issue of clerical dress.

== Participants ==
=== Bishops ===
Of 20 bishops of the time (the see of Oxford being vacant), there were 12 who had left the Kingdom of England under Mary Tudor: the "Marian exiles". Of those who had remained, some had done so covertly.

Name	Exile?	See	Comments
Gilbert Berkeley	Frankfurt	Bath and Wells	
Richard Cheyney	No	Bristol, Gloucester	Did not subscribe the 39 articles (ODNB)
Matthew Parker	No	Canterbury	
William Barlow	Germany, Poland, Emden	Chichester	
Thomas Bentham	Zurich, Basle	Coventry and Lichfield	
Richard Cox	Frankfurt	Ely	Probably a reforming bishop
William Alley	No	Exeter	drafts
John Scory	Emden	Hereford	
Nicholas Bullingham	Emden	Lincoln	
Edmund Grindal	Frankfurt	London	Reformer, supported attempts to revise the Prayer Book rubrics.
John Parkhurst	Zurich	Norwich	
Edmund Scambler	London	Peterborough	
Edmund Gheast	No	Rochester	drafting of article XXIX
John Jewel	Strasbourg, Zürich, Padua	Salisbury	
Robert Horne	Zurich, Frankfurt, Strasburg	Winchester	
Edwin Sandys	Frankfurt, Augsburg, Strasbourg, Zürich	Worcester	Draft on the sign of the cross in baptism (ODNB)
Rowland Meyrick	No	Bangor	
Hugh Jones, as proxy	No	Llandaff	
Thomas Davies	No	St. Asaph	
Richard Davies	Geneva	St. David's	

Of these bishops, 19 attended at the start—not Jones, who was acting as proxy for the aged Anthony Kitchin.

=== Lower House ===
There were 27 in the Lower House of Convocation who had been émigrés of Queen Mary's time. An estimate of over 50 who had conformed in Mary's reign has also been given. Carlson argues for a definite group of 34 Puritan reformers in the Lower House.

==== Deans ====
Name	Exile?	Standing in convocation	Comments
John Bale	Basel	Prebendary of Canterbury.	
William Bradbridge	No	Chancellor of Chichester	Voted for the six articles.
William Day		Provost of Eton College	Supporter of the six articles.
Gabriel Goodman		Dean of Westminster (ODNB)	Against further reform.
Francis Mallett		Dean of Lincoln	Voted by proxy.
Alexander Nowell		Dean of St Paul's	Prolocutor on the nomination of Matthew Parker, reformer, drafted catechism
Laurence Nowell		Dean of Lichfield	Brother of Alexander; voted to change ceremonies (ODNB)
John Pedder	Frankfurt	Dean of Worcester	Supported 21 requests, voted for six articles, subscribed the 39 articles.
John Salisbury		Dean of Norwich	Subscribed to the 39 articles, signed the petition for discipline.
Thomas Sampson	Frankfurt, Zürich, Geneva, Lausanne (ODNB)	Dean of Christ Church, Oxford	Radical, opponent of ceremonial

Nicholas Wotton, Dean of Canterbury, did not attend.(ODNB)

==== Archdeacons ====
Name	Exile?	Standing in convocation	Comments
John Aylmer	Switzerland	Archdeacon of Lincoln	Held back in debate,(ODNB) subscribed to the 39 articles.
Robert Beaumont	Geneva.	Archdeacon of Huntingdon	Among the 33 signatories.(ODNB) Supported the six articles.
John Bridgewater	No	Archdeacon of Rochester	Voted against the six articles. (ODNB)
Thomas Cole	Frankfurt	Archdeacon of Essex	One of the 34 proposing the seven articles; abstained on the six articles.
Robert Crowley		Archdeacon of Hereford?. Canon of Hereford.(ODNB)	
Thomas Lever		Archdeacon of Coventry	reformer.
John Mullins		Archdeacon of London	Supported seven articles, abstained on six articles.
John Pullain	Geneva	Archdeacon of Colchester	Advocate of Calvinism.
Nicholas Robinson		Archdeacon of Merioneth	
Richard Rogers	Frankfurt	Archdeacon of St Asaph	Reformer.
Thomas Spencer	Zürich	Archdeacon of Chichester	
John Watson		Archdeacon of Surrey	Conservative.(ODNB)
Thomas Watts	Frankfurt (ODNB)	Archdeacon of Middlesex	Reformer.
Robert Wisdom	Frankfurt, Heidelberg (ODNB)	Archdeacon of Ely	Voted for six articles.

==== Proctors ====
Name	Exile?	Standing in convocation	Comments
Thomas Bickley	France	Proctor for Coventry and Lichfield,	Reformer.
Walter Bower		Proctor for the clergy of Somerset	
James Calfhill		Three votes; proctor for the London clergy and Oxford chapter	One of the 34 signing the seven articles. (ODNB)
Thomas Godwin		Proctor for Lincoln chapter (ODNB)	Voted for further reform.
Thomas Huet	No	??; precentor of St David's Cathedral (ODNB)	Signed the 39 articles.
Thomas Lancaster		??	Voted for six articles. (58/59 ODNB)
Robert Lougher		Proctor for the clergy of the diocese of Exeter (ODNB)	Opposed six articles.
Stephen Nevinson		Proctor for the clergy of the diocese of Canterbury (ODNB)	Reformer
Andrew Peerson		Proctor for Llandaff (ODNB)	Voted against six articles.
Michael Renniger		Proctor for Winchester chapter (ODNB)	Reformer.
Arthur Saul		Proctor for Gloucester chapter (ODNB)	Reformer.
John Walker	Not known (ODNB)	Proctor for the Suffolk clergy	
Robert Weston		Proctor for the Lichfield clergy	
Percival Wiburn		Proctor for Rochester chapter (ODNB)	

== Procedure ==
The Convocation was called simultaneously with a Parliament, and took place in London, in St Paul's Cathedral. Its sessions took place from 11 January to 14 April 1563 (N.S.). Robert Weston opened the Convocation on 12 January, formally, with a prorogation to the following day. The actual proceedings of Convocation opened on 13 January, when the Litany was sung, and a Latin sermon by William Day preached.

== The 39 Articles, to 1571 ==
The subsequent passage of the 39 Articles into the orthodoxy of the Church of England was tortuous. There are various versions of the Articles: manuscript from the Convocation, printed in Latin (Reyner Wolfe) and English by John Cawood and Richard Jugge (1563); printed later. A bill in the Parliament of 1566 to confirm the articles from the Convocation was halted in the House of Lords, by pressure from the Queen.
