= Troubles at Frankfurt =

The Troubles at Frankfurt was a name given retrospectively to quarrels of the Marian exiles in Frankfurt am Main in the mid-1550s that involved many of the communities of British exiles living in continental Europe during the reign of Mary I of England. The first minister of the exile congregation in Frankfurt was the Scottish reformer John Knox. Politically, Frankfurt was a Free Imperial City of the Holy Roman Empire.

== Preliminary situation ==
In the summer of 1554, a community of exiled English nationals settled in Frankfurt and was allotted a church that was also being used by the congregation of Valérand Poullain. As a condition for using the same building, the city magistrates told the English exiles that they had to adopt the same doctrine and ceremonies as Poullain's congregation, to avoid conflict between the two groups. Reacting to the form that was laid down in the 1552 Second Prayer Book of Edward VI, many in the English community—led by William Whittingham—saw this as an opportunity to procure an English church that they thought was more closely aligned with Biblical teaching. Ultimately, the majority of the exiles would agree to the changes, but a minority who favored the 1552 Prayer Book began to work behind the scenes in order to strengthen their position in the church and amend or overturn the changes that had been made. Whittingham sent a declaration of unity to other exile groups in August, inviting them to move to Frankfurt and join what they viewed as a newly reformed English church. Strasburg misunderstood the statement as a request for a minister and prepared to send one of its leaders. The Frankfurt group responded by making known its intention to elect three ministers and therefore did not need the one appointed by Strasbourg.

Of the men elected by the Frankfurt congregation, only John Knox, then based at Geneva, immediately accepted the call. Knox arrived in early November 1554 with the support of John Calvin, but the lines between the 'prayerbook faction' and the reformed faction were already drawn. As the lone minister of the church, Knox became the de facto leader for the reforms that had been agreed upon by the exiles. However, the minority who supported the Prayer Book had been able to add to their numbers by recruiting several fellow-exiles to relocate to Frankfurt. Several envoys were also sent from various exile communities to Frankfurt to ensure the community would use the unchanged Prayer Book. Among these was Edmund Grindal with a group from Strasbourg. Grindal then wrote about the situation to Nicholas Ridley in England, who found the local compromise, in line with what happened for other exile groups, quite reasonable but had some criticism of Knox's approach. Knox and Whittingham at this point pushed for a definition of essentials in the Prayer Book, causing Grindal to depart rather than be seen to negotiate.

== Adiaphora ==
In the process of the dispute, Knox and Whittingham wrote a Latin summary of the English prayerbook and sent it to Calvin for his opinion. The result was perhaps more moderate than was hoped, as Calvin commented that it contained "many tolerable foolish things" but ultimately encouraged peace, given the trials that Protestants were facing back in England. As during the earlier vestments controversy under Edward VI, the concept of adiaphora or "things indifferent" was once more a crux of debate, rather than helping to build consensus.

== Compromise attempts ==
Among the disagreements between the reform party and the Prayer Book party, the form of the communion service was significant. Knox would not use the Genevan order since it would offend Poullain and others, but neither would he allow the use of the English prayerbook form. A second of Frankfurt's elected ministers, Thomas Lever, arrived to Knox's relief in January 1555. However, this relief was short-lived, as Lever became the leader of the Prayer Book faction within a few weeks of his arrival.

At the end of January 1555, a committee of Knox, Lever, Whittingham, and Henry Parry produced the 'Liturgy of Compromise' (not extant) that was accepted by the congregation. Interestingly, this 'Liturgy of Compromise' would ultimately be rejected by the prayerbook faction, but it would be used later at Geneva by the Anglo-Scottish congregation under Knox.

== Exacerbation of the dispute ==
Despite the temporary status of the agreed order, Prayer Book supporters continued to work behind the scenes to shift the church's consensus. As a result, several influential men moved to the city in support of the Prayer Book, including Thomas Ashley, Richard Cox, John Jewel, Thomas Sampson, and John Scory. Cox quickly assumed leadership of the Prayer Book party, and he along with the other men attended the services on Sunday, 17 March 1555. The newcomers strongly objected to the compromise liturgy, which omitted the litany with the congregations' spoken responses. They insisted that Jewel be allowed to read the litany from the Prayer Book that morning, even though he had recanted the Protestant faith before he left England. The pluralist was also not above reproach among the Frankfurt exiles because of the multiple benefices he held back in England, and Knox spent that afternoon's sermon decrying the Prayer Book and the scandal of pluralities. Cox and Lever denounced Knox's diatribe, and the congregation agreed to discuss the matter at a congregational meeting on the following Tuesday.

Unbeknownst to Knox and the reform party, on the Friday before that Sunday, two members of the Prayer Book party had appeared before the Frankfurt city magistrates, bringing charges of treason against their minister Knox. Knox had written An Admonition to Christians just a year before, in which he disparaged Phillip II, Mary I, and Charles V, Holy Roman Emperor. According to Knox's detractors, such radical language (especially likening Charles V to Nero) offended even sympathetic rulers and encouraged Roman Catholic persecution of Protestants in England and elsewhere. Notably, John Hooper had just been burned at the stake in February, and his wife and children were among the Frankfurt exile community.

That Tuesday, Knox defied his own supporters and insisted that Cox's group be admitted as members of the congregation. He reasoned that he could convince even their hard hearts of the Prayer Book's weaknesses. He did not foresee that the Prayer Book party, led by Cox, would gain a majority in the church and forbid Knox from preaching.

When the church next met on the following Thursday, Knox was in attendance. By that time, the church was aware that charges of treason had been brought against Knox. Cox and his supporters left that morning's service, insisting they could not be in the same room as someone who had made treasonous statements against Charles V.

== Departure of Knox ==
By the following Sunday, the Magistrates had taken control of the exile church, ordering them to use Poullain's liturgy. They also asked Knox to leave the city, which he did on Monday. 26 March. Cox's cohort quickly took control of the church and reinstated a lightly edited version of the Prayer Book. They then ostracized those who had supported the reform party, including William Whittingham, Christopher Goodman, Thomas Cole (archdeacon of Essex), and John Foxe. Many would eventually make their way to Geneva, where they would be welcomed and encouraged to establish their own church according to their revised liturgy and ecclesiology. That group would enjoy several years of peace and would produce the Geneva Bible and the Anglo-Genevan Metrical psalter, which would become some of the most influential works in Elizabethan England and in reformed Scotland. Meanwhile, the Frankfurt exile community would continue to be mired in conflict until its members left for England following the coronation of Elizabeth I.

== Historiography ==
The criticism Ridley had of Knox was suppressed in published versions of his letter during the 1560, by Miles Coverdale and John Foxe.

The extended conflicts are documented in two printed sources: A Brieff discours off the troubles begonne at Franckford ... A.D. 1554 and Knox's History of the Reformation.

The former was printed anonymously in 1575 (though one extant copy is dated 1574) and reprinted in 1642, 1707–08, 1846, and 1907. It may have been issued in response to a sermon delivered at St Paul's Cross on the subject of the Genevan form of church discipline then advocated by John Field. Though it remains uncertain, the book's editor is commonly identified as William Whittingham. Patrick Collinson has made a case for Thomas Wood as the editor, but more recently he agreed with M. A. Simpson who argued that John Field was one of many authors.

Much of its material must have come to its compiler(s) from other hands; the letters it contains vary in apparent authenticity, and the documentary sources behind it are no longer extant except, in adapted form, parts of John Knox's account of his time in Frankfurt. Noting these things, Simpson conjectures that A Brief Discourse was the product of several editors, the last of whom he believes to have been John Field. The title page advertises A Brief Discourse as an explanation of the nature and origins of the conflicts in the Church of England then taking place and the emergence of separatism and Presbyterianism. It is partisan history.

Perhaps seeking to balance out the partisanship displayed in that by Knox and in A brief discourse, George M. Ella published an extended monograph, which offers a decidedly pro-Prayer-Book re-telling of the story.

More recently, new letters were discovered at the Denbighshire Records Office that relate to the Troubles. These have been transcribed by Knox's biographer Jane EA Dawson and are available online via the Letters from Exile website. Building off the latest scholarship, including these newly found letters, Timothy Duguid's article offers a more balanced presentation of the conflict, including timelines of correspondence and of the major events surrounding the conflict.
