= Westminster Conference 1559 =

Religious debate in the Palace of Westminster

The Westminster Conference of 1559 was a religious disputation held early in the reign of Elizabeth I of England. Although the proceedings themselves were perfunctory, the outcome shaped the Elizabethan religious settlement and resulted in the authorisation of the 1559 Book of Common Prayer.

== Participants ==
The participants were nine leading Catholic churchmen, including five bishops, and nine prominent Protestant reformers of the Church of England.

Catholics:

- The bishops Ralph Baynes, John White, Thomas Watson, Owen Oglethorpe, Cuthbert Scott; with Alban Langdale, Henry Cole, William Chedsey, and Nicholas Harpsfield.

Protestants

- John Jewel, John Scory, Richard Cox, David Whitehead (in some sources called Thomas Whitehead), Edwin Sandys, Edmund Grindal, Robert Horne, John Aylmer, and Edmund Gheast.

== Accounts ==
From the Protestant side, Cox and Jewel gave official accounts, and John Foxe and Raphael Holinshed published on the conference based on those. Other accounts, from Catholics, are by Aloisio Schivenoglia, the Count de Feria, and Nicholas Sanders; Schivenoglia acted as secretary to Sir Thomas Tresham.

== Proceedings ==
The conference started on 31 March 1559; the disputation began, and was stopped because of disagreement on rules, and was adjourned (as it turned out, permanently), on April 3 (a Monday). The timing coincided with the Easter recess of Parliament. It has been argued that the event was staged to discredit the Catholic position on reform, and Patrick Collinson states that the disputation was manipulated to that end. It took place in Westminster Hall.

There were three articles at issue in the disputation (on the liturgical language, church authority over forms of worship, and scriptural warrant for propitiatory masses). Nicholas Bacon was in the chair, with Nicholas Heath sitting by him. John Feckenham and James Turberville sat with the bishops' side.

For the Catholic side, Henry Cole began, defending the use of Latin in the liturgy. Then Robert Horne replied, with a prepared statement. He put the case for English. The disputation then foundered: there was a lack of agreement whether it should be oral or written, and whether Latin or English should be employed. Heath, who had collaborated in Bacon in setting up the disputation, did not intervene to support the Catholic side's view on the pre-agreed conditions.

Bacon in the chair was not neutral: he pushed some of the Catholic participants into offensive behaviour. Of the bishops, Watson and White were sent to the Tower of London. Sir Ambrose Cave and Sir Richard Sackville were ordered to search their houses and papers. Six more of the participants were fined by the privy council.

== Aftermath ==
William Bill preached on the reasons for the imprisonment of the two bishops on 9 April. On the following day a new bill for royal supremacy was moved. The Act of Uniformity 1558 passed successfully through Parliament, but the margin in the House of Lords was a slender three votes. Edward Rishton attributed absences of Catholic bishops and laymen from the Lords to underhand tactics.

When in the following year Jewel restated the position of the Church of England after the settlement, and invited refutations, Cole replied to him, starting an extended controversy.
