= Christopher Goodman =

English priest (1520–1603)

Christopher Goodman BD (1520–1603) was an English reforming clergyman and writer. He was a Marian exile, who left England to escape persecution during the Counter-Reformation in the reign of Queen Mary I. He was the author of a work on limits to obedience to rulers, and a contributor to the Geneva Bible. He was a friend of John Knox, and on Mary's death went to Scotland, later returning to England where he failed to conform.

== Early life ==
He was probably born (1520) in Chester. When about eighteen he entered Brasenose College, Oxford, graduating as B.A. 4 Feb. 1541, and M.A. 13 June 1544. In 1547 he became a senior student at Christ Church, Oxford, and was proctor in 1549. He proceeded B.D. in 1551 and is said to have become Lady Margaret's Professor of Divinity about 1548. At Oxford Goodman made friends with Bartlet Green.

== Marian exile ==
Goodman left England in 1554, and on 23 November his name appears among the signatures to a letter from the exiles at Strasburg. He afterwards joined the schism among the reformers at Frankfurt and withdrew with William Whittingham and other exiles to Geneva; they jointly wrote a letter to the Frankfurt congregation to defend their departure.

The congregation at Geneva chose John Knox and Goodman in September 1555 for their pastors, and the two formed a lifelong friendship. During his exile Goodman took part in Miles Coverdale's translation of the Bible and helped Knox in the "book of common order".

Both he and Knox wrote some acrimonious tracts. The most famous by Goodman was entitled How superior Powers ought to be obeyed of their subjects, and wherein they may lawfully be by God's word disobeyed and resisted . . . Geneva, 1558. The book, in favor of Wyatt's rebellion, bitterly attacked Mary I of England and the government of women in general, which afterwards drew down Elizabeth I's displeasure upon the author. Knox's First Blast of the Trumpet was published in the same year, and the tracts were secretly circulated in England. Their violence was generally disapproved, even by their own party. Goodman also published while abroad a Commentary upon Amos, in which he likens Mary to Proserpine, queen of Hades. On Elizabeth's accession, he returned briefly and somewhat furtively to London.

== In Scotland ==
In June 1559 Knox asked Goodman to join him at Edinburgh, and Goodman went to Scotland early in September, acting as escort to Knox's wife and family from Geneva. In October he was made one of the council appointed by the lords of the congregation to treat of religion, he and Knox preaching daily. In November he became minister of Ayr.

In the following July Goodman was appointed to St. Andrews. He also went about Scotland preaching, and in August 1560 spent ten days in the Isle of Man, where he preached twice. Two years later he and Knox together visited some of the reformed churches in Scotland.

== Return to England ==
Intercessions were meanwhile made for his return to England, though John Calvin exhorted him to finish his work in Scotland. Goodman's irascibility impeded his progress. Cecil told Sadler in 1559 that, next to Knox, Goodman's name was the most odious of his party to Elizabeth, and fellow reformer John Jewel wrote that Goodman was "a man of irritable temper, and too pertinaceous in anything he has once undertaken". However, the Earl of Mar favoured his views, and in 1562 asked leave to bring him in his train to a projected meeting between Elizabeth and Mary, Queen of Scots. Ambrose Dudley, 3rd Earl of Warwick from Le Havre also begged (in December) Dudley and Cecil to give Goodman employment with his army in Normandy.

At last, by Randolph's advice he ventured into England in the winter of 1565. He went to Ireland (January 1566) as chaplain to Sir Henry Sidney, the new lord deputy, who in the spring of 1567 recommended him to be bishop of Dublin and promised him the deanery of St. Patrick's Cathedral. Goodman, however, received neither of these offices. It was probably when Sidney returned to England in 1570 that he was appointed to the living of Alford, near Chester, and made archdeacon of Richmond.

In the next year he was deprived by Bishop Vaughan for nonconformity, and in April 1571 brought before the ecclesiastical commissioners at Lambeth; the commission also moved at this time against Edward Dering, John Field, Thomas Lever, Thomas Sampson and Percival Wiburn. He was obliged to make a full recantation of his published opinions, and a protest in writing of his dutiful obedience to the queen's person and her lawful government. In June he was again examined before Archbishop Matthew Parker and forbidden to preach. He complained (26 July) to Robert Dudley, 1st Earl of Leicester of his hard treatment. In August he returned to Chester.

In 1584 Goodman refused to subscribe to the articles and the service book, and Archbishop John Whitgift complained of his perversity to the lord treasurer. Having no living he was not however again examined but allowed to spend the rest of his days peacefully at Chester. When James Ussher came to England to collect books for the Dublin Library, he visited Goodman (4 June 1603), then lying on his deathbed. Goodman was buried at Chester, in St. Bride's Church.
