= Perceval Wiburn =

English clergyman (1533?–1606?)

Perceval Wiburn or Wyburn (Percival) (1533?–1606?) was an English clergyman, a Marian exile, suspected nonconformist and Puritan, and polemical opponent of Robert Parsons.

== Life ==
Born about 1533, he was admitted a scholar of St. John's College, Cambridge, on 11 November 1546, and matriculated as a pensioner in the same month. He proceeded B.A, in 1551, and on 8 April 1552 he was elected and admitted a fellow of his college.

A man of strong Protestant opinions, he sympathised with the reforming tendencies of Edward VI's government, and after the accession of Queen Mary he left England. In May 1557 he joined the English congregation at Geneva. On the accession of Elizabeth he returned to England; in 1558 he proceeded M.A., and in the same year was appointed junior dean and philosophy lecturer in his college. On 25 January 1560 he was ordained deacon by Edmund Grindal, and on 27 March 1560 he received priest's orders from Richard Davies. On 24 February 1561 he was installed a prebendary of Norwich, and on 6 April 1561 was admitted a senior fellow of St. John's College. On 23 November 1561 he was installed a canon of Westminster.

Wiburn took part, as proctor of the clergy of Rochester, in the convocation of 1563, and subscribed the revised articles. On 8 March 1564 he was instituted to the vicarage of St. Sepulchre's, Holborn. In the same year however, he was sequestered on refusing subscription, and, a married man, in order to maintain his family employed himself in husbandry. The ecclesiastical authorities connived at his keeping his prebends and at his preaching in public.

In 1566 he visited Theodore Beza at Geneva and Heinrich Bullinger at Zurich, and to solicit assistance from the Swiss reformers. It was probably at this time that Wiburn wrote his manuscript description of the State of the Church of England. He was suspected by the English ecclesiastics of calumniating the church, an accusation which rejected, and which in a letter dated 25 Feb. 1567 he asked Bullinger to contradict.

In June 1571 Wiburn was cited for nonconformity before Archbishop Matthew Parker, together with Christopher Goodman, Thomas Lever, Thomas Sampson, and some others, and in 1573 he was examined by the council concerning his opinion on the Admonition to the Parliament, which had appeared in the preceding year Wiburn declared that the opinions expressed in it were not lawful, but he was forbidden to preach until further orders. He was later restored to the ministry, and was preacher at Rochester.

In 1581 he was one of the divines chosen for their learning and theological attainments to dispute with the papists. In the same year he published a reply to Robert Parsons, who under the name of John Howlet had dedicated his Brief Discourse to Queen Elizabeth. Wiburn's treatise was entitled "A Checke or Reproofe of M. Howlets vntimely shreeching in her Majesties eares". He was again suspended from preaching in 1583, by Archbishop John Whitgift. He continued under suspension for at least five years.

Towards the close of his life he preached at Battersea, near London. Being disabled for a time by breaking his leg, he was assisted by Richard Sedgwick. He died about 1606 at an advanced age.
