= William Fyeneux =

William Fyeneux was a 16th-century influential English Protestant.

Fyeneux was one of the Marian exiles. Mary I of England arranged for eleven of the exiles to be arrested for sedition, including Fyeneux.
