= A Narrative of the Pursuit of English Refugees in Germany Under Queen Mary =

English chronicle of 1550

A Narrative of the Pursuit of English Refugees in Germany Under Queen Mary was a 1550s English chronicle by John Brett.

Brett was a messenger for Mary I of England when she tried to have the Marian exiles returned to England. His chronicle, sometimes shorted to Brett's Narrative or Brett's Chronicle survives, and gives us detailed information on this episode.
