= John Mullins (priest) =

English churchman and Marian exile

John Mullins or Molyns (died 1591) was an English churchman and Marian exile, archdeacon of London from 1559.

== Life ==
Born in Somerset, Mullins was made a probationary Fellow of Magdalen College, Oxford in 1541; and proceeded B.A. 1541, M.A. 1545, D.D. 1565–6. At this period Magdalen and Christ Church were the two leading Protestant colleges of the University of Oxford. Magdalen had an evangelical group around Thomas Bentham, John Foxe, and Lawrence Humphrey. Mullins was involved in the 1550 petition against the Catholic President of Magdalen, Owen Oglethorpe, one of ten signatories who included also Walter Bower, Michael Reninger and Arthur Saul.

In Queen Mary's reign Mullins left for Zürich, after Bishop Stephen Gardiner's visitation of Magdalen College. At Frankfurt he was reader in Greek to the exiled English. He was one of those, with his associate Alexander Nowell, who shared the Frankfurt house of Thomas Watts.

Mullins returned to England early in Elizabeth I's reign, and was appointed in 1559 canon of St Paul's Cathedral and archdeacon of London. In February 1561 he was collated to the rectory of Theydon Garnon, Essex, and in May 1577 to the rectory of Bocking, Essex. He was made dean of Bocking in October 1583, along with John Still.

In 1573 Mullins brought up the "troubles at Frankfurt"—the theological contention between Richard Cox and John Knox in 1555–6—in a sermon. He himself had been an external observer, moving from Zürich to Frankfurt after Knox had departed. The historical issue once raised, Thomas Wood published A Brieff Discours off the Troubles Begonne at Franckford (1575, anonymous, attribution by Patrick Collinson). It aimed to rebut the views of Mullins and John Young, and to reach back to the 1550s for precedents to the contemporary English debates.

== Death and legacy ==
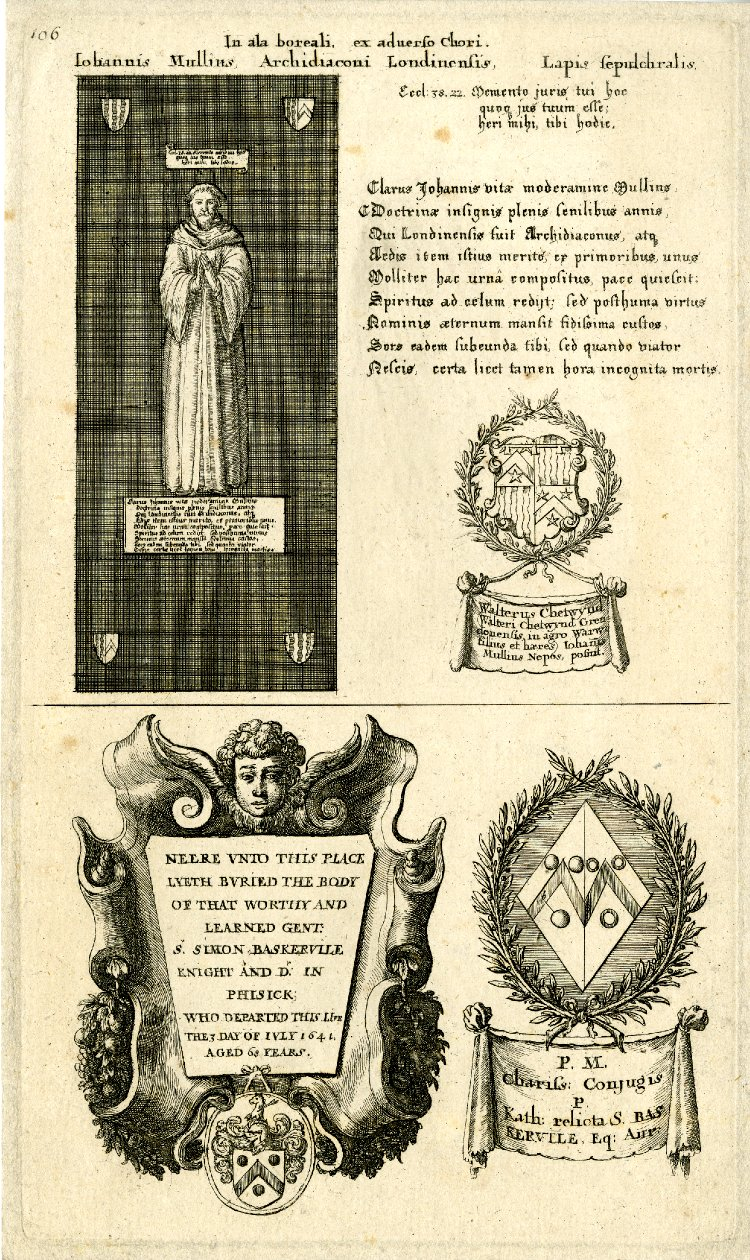
Tomb slab of John Mullins in St Paul's Cathedral (top)

Mullins died in June 1591, and was buried in the north aisle of St Paul's Cathedral. By his will he left money to purchase lands to endow an exhibition for two scholars at Magdalen College.

== Works ==
Mullins published a Greek poem in Carmina Latina et Graeca in Mortem duorum fratrum Suffolciensium, Henrici et Caroli Brandon, 1552.

== Family ==
Mullins was married, and his daughter Mary was the wife of Walter Chetwynd.

== Notes ==
Attribution

This article incorporates text from a publication now in the public domain: Lee, Sidney, ed. (1894). "Molyns, John". Dictionary of National Biography. Vol. 38. London: Smith, Elder & Co.
