= John Brett (chronicler) =

English chronicler

- Born: ca. 1556; England
- Died: n/a Germany?
- Occupation: Royal messenger

John Brett (fl. 1556) was a messenger for Mary I of England when she tried to have the Marian exiles returned to England. His chronicle survives, and gives us detailed information on this episode.

His chronicle is entitled, A Narrative of the Pursuit of English Refugees in Germany Under Queen Mary but is often known simply as Brett's Chronicle or Brett's Narrative.
