= Martin Heton =

English Bishop

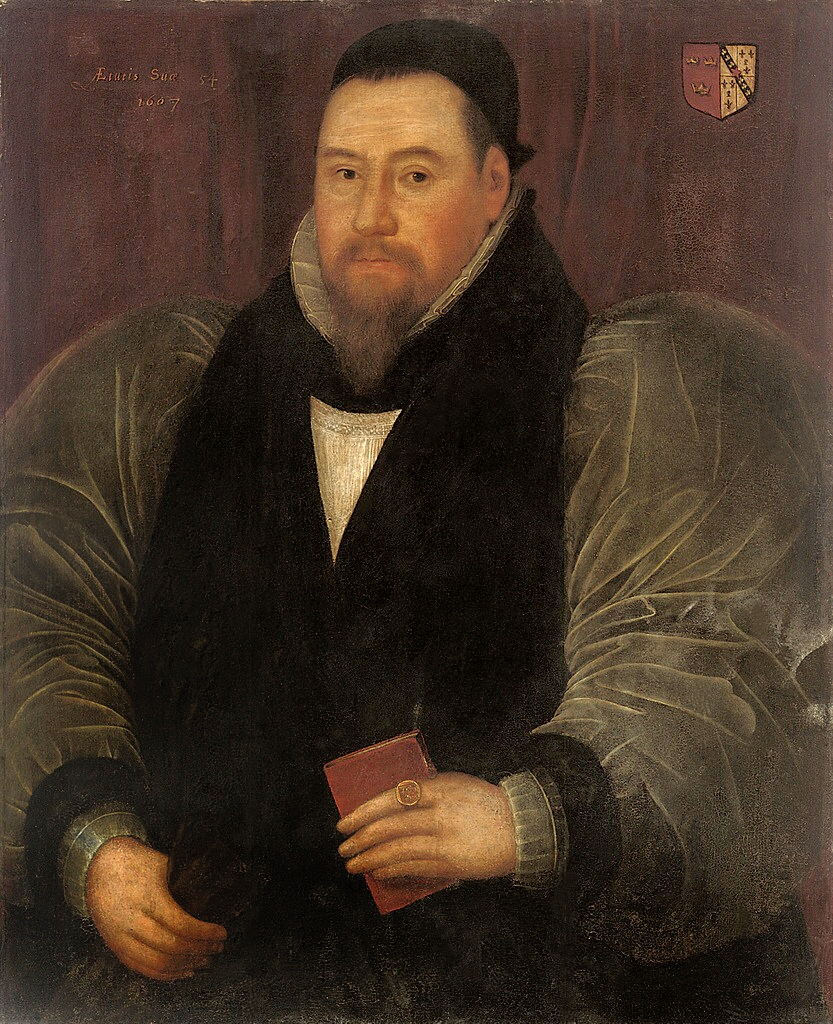
- Martin Heton, 1607
- Born: 1554
- Died: 1609 (aged 54–55)
- Occupation: British bishop

Martin Heton (1554–1609) was an English Bishop whose grandfather was the Lord Mayor of London.

== Life ==
His father George Heton, Chamberlain of London, was prominent in the London commercial world and as a church reformer. His mother Joanna was daughter of Martin Bowes, Lord Mayor of London in 1545. He was educated at Westminster School and Christ Church, Oxford.

He was Vice-Chancellor of the University of Oxford in 1588. He became Dean of Winchester in 1589, and Bishop of Ely in 1599. There is a story that Elizabeth I applied pressure to him, or his predecessor Richard Cox, over some land deals disadvantageous to the diocese, in a letter beginning “Proud prelate!” But scholars from the nineteenth century onwards, for example Mandell Creighton, have considered the letter in question a hoax of the eighteenth century.

A fat man, Heton was supposedly complimented by the king James I with the comment "Fat men are apt to make lean sermons; but yours are not lean, but larded with good learning."

He died in Mildenhall, Suffolk in 1609 and is buried in Ely Cathedral.

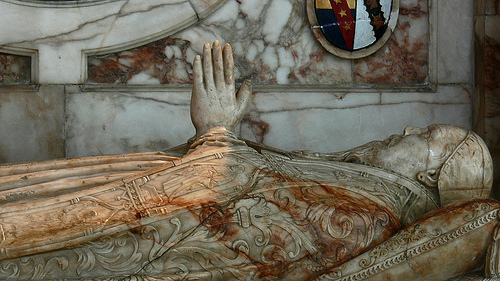
Alabaster effigy of Martin Heton in Ely Cathedral.

== Family ==
His daughter Ann married Sir Robert Filmer. His brother-in-law wask Knight Simon Weston.
