= Thomas Cole (archdeacon of Essex) =

English Protestant churchman (died 1571)

Thomas Cole (died 1571) was an English Protestant churchman, a Marian exile who became archdeacon of Essex.

== Life ==
A native of Lincolnshire, he graduated M.A. at Oxford. He held the mastership of Maidstone School in 1552, but emigrated to Frankfurt on the accession of Queen Mary. There he made the acquaintance of John Knox. He subsequently moved to Geneva.

Having returned to England Cole was presented to the rectory of High Ongar, Essex, in 1559. He was collated to the archdeaconry of Essex in the ensuing year, and subsequently appointed commissary of the archbishop in the archdeaconries of Essex and Colchester. In 1560 he was also installed in the prebend of Rugmere in St. Paul's Cathedral.

Cole was present at the Convocation of 1563 and subscribed the original Thirty-nine Articles and the petition for discipline presented by the lower house. In 1564 he commenced D.D. at Cambridge, and the same year he was presented to the rectory of Stanford Rivers, Essex. He had a reputation for eloquence and also for a tendency towards nonconformity. He died in 1571. He was buried at St Mary Abchurch 2 July 1571

== Works ==
Cole published:

- A sermon preached at Maidstone in Lent, 1553; and also
- A sermon preached before the queen at Windsor in 1564.

He had a hand in the framing of the Genevan form of worship.

== Notes ==
Attribution

This article incorporates text from a publication now in the public domain: "Cole, Thomas (d.1571)". Dictionary of National Biography. London: Smith, Elder & Co. 1885–1900.
