= Marian exiles =

English Protestant exiles between 1553 and 1558

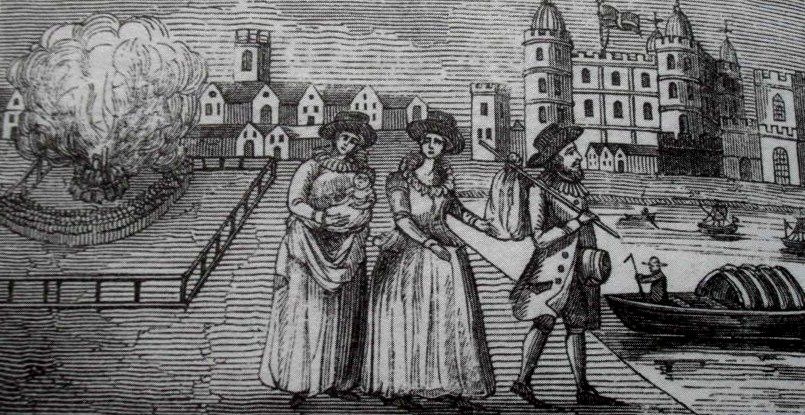
Catherine Willoughby, Duchess of Suffolk, fleeing Catholic England with her husband Richard Bertie, her daughter Susan and a wet nurse

The Marian exiles were English Protestants who fled to continental Europe during the 1553–1558 reign of the Catholic monarchs Queen Mary I and King Philip. They settled chiefly in Protestant countries such as the Netherlands, Switzerland and Germany, and also in France, Italy and Poland.

== Exile communities ==
According to English historian John Strype, more than 800 Protestants fled to the continent, mainly to the Low Countries, Germany, and Switzerland, and joined with Reformed Churches there or formed their own congregations. A few exiles went to Scotland, Denmark, and other Scandinavian countries.

Notable English exile communities were located in the cities of Aarau, Basel, Cologne, Duisburg, Emden, Frankfurt, Geneva, Padua, Strasbourg, Venice, Wesel, Worms, and Zürich. The exiles did not plan to remain on the continent any longer than was necessary; there was considerable controversy and anxiety among them and those who remained in England over the legitimacy of fleeing, rather than facing, religious persecution. This concern contributed to the attention and authority given to those who remained in England and were martyred, as in the writings of one of the most famous exiles, John Foxe.

During their continental sojourn, few of the exiles became well integrated economically or politically into their new communities. With the exception of the exile community in Aarau, the majority of exiles were clergy (67) or theological students (119). The next largest group was composed of gentry (166) who, with others back in England such as Sir Rowland Hill (who would be identified on the frontispiece as the publisher of the Geneva Bible), financed the exiles. This group included Elizabeth Berkeley (Countess of Ormond), Sir Peter Carew, William Cecil, Sir John Cheke, Sir Anthony Cooke, Sir Francis Knollys, Sir Richard Morrison, Dame Dorothy Stafford, and Sir Thomas Wroth. Of about 500 known English exiles, there were 40 merchants, 32 artisans, 7 printers, 3 lawyers, 3 physicians, 3 yeomen, 13 servants, and 19 men with no profession. Of the artisans 12–17 were weavers who settled in Aarau. Strype names London merchant and exile Thomas Heton (or Heyton, Eaton) as the host-general of all the exiles. Financial backers for the exiles included London merchants Richard Springham and John Abel. Support also came from the King of Denmark, the Prince Palatine of the Rhine, the Duke of Württemberg, the Duke of Bipont, and many continental leaders of the reformed movement: Heinrich Bullinger, Konrad Pelikan, Bibliander, Josias Simmler, Wolphius, and Ludwig Lavater.

The Marian exiles included many important or soon-to-be important English Protestant leaders. Former and future bishops among them included John Aylmer, Miles Coverdale, John Ponet, John Scory, Richard Cox, Edmund Grindal (future archbishop of York, then Canterbury), Edwin Sandys (future archbishop of York), John Bale, John Jewel, James Pilkington, and Thomas Bentham. The conflicts that broke out between the exiles over church organization, discipline, and forms of worship presaged the religious politics of the reign of Elizabeth I and the emergence of Puritanism and Presbyterianism.

== Strasbourg ==
The English congregation in Strasbourg organised its services in conformity with the 1552 Book of Common Prayer. Its leaders and membership included at times the former and future bishops John Ponet, John Scory, Richard Cox, Edmund Grindal, Edwin Sandys, John Aylmer, and John Bale. Others there included Cheke, Morison, Cook, Carew, Wroth, James Haddon, John Huntington, John Geoffrey, John Pedder, Michael Renniger, Augustin Bradbridge, Thomas Steward, Humphrey Alcockson, Thomas Lakin, Thomas Crafton, Guido and Thomas Eton, Alexander Nowell, Arthur Saule, William Cole, Christopher Goodman, Richard Hilles, Richard Chambers, and one or both of the Hales brothers. Myles Coverdale apparently made several visits to the Strasbourg community.

== Frankfurt ==
The first English exile group in Frankfurt arrived on 27 June 1554. With the help of a local magistrate, they secured the use of a vacant church building. They held their first service on 29 July using a reformed liturgy drawn up by William Whittingham. The congregation adopted a semi-Presbyterian system where deacons were expected to preach.

At the request of local authorities in this Lutheran city, the English church order had been made to conform to the newly established French reformed church in Frankfurt. The French church included a number of Walloon weavers who had been brought to England by Protector Somerset. Since then they had been under the supervision of Valerand Poullain, formerly John Calvin's successor as minister of the French congregation in Strasbourg. In England, Poullain's congregation had as much autonomy as the London Stranger churches and, like them, based their church order on the models of Zwingli and Calvin.

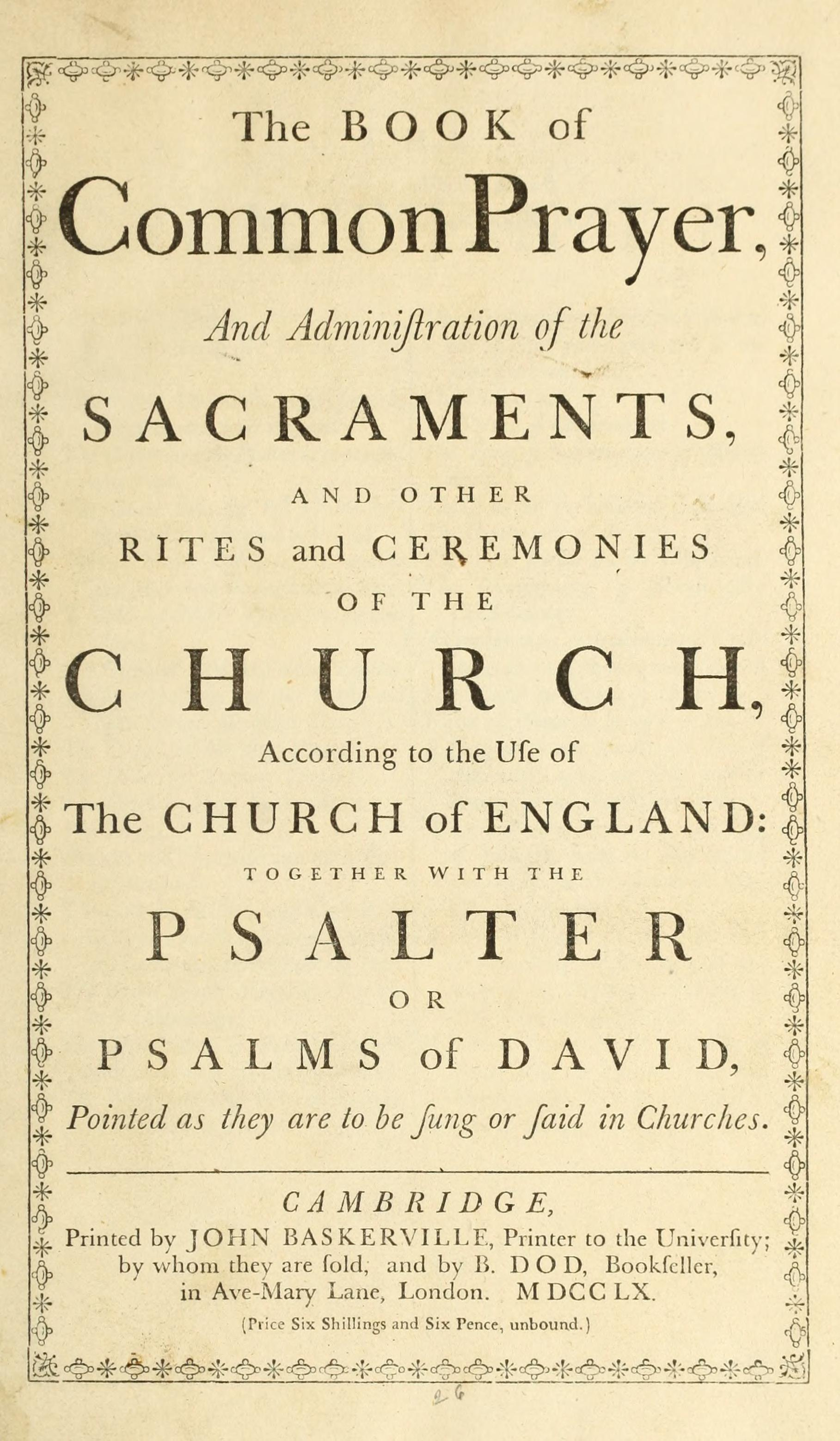
English book of Common Prayer

Following this continental reformed precedent, the English exiles in Frankfurt offered themselves as the model church for all the English in exile and put out a call for ministers from the other congregations. However, they had gone further than many of their countrymen would follow, particularly those in Strasbourg and Zürich who wanted to retain use of the second (1552) Edwardian Book of Common Prayer. For that reason the English Church at Frankfurt became preoccupied with disputes over the use of the prayer book and church order in general.

The chief members of the Frankfurt congregation during its existence were David Whitehead, Sandys, Nowell, Foxe, Bale, Horne, Whittingham, Knox, Aylmer, Bentham, Sampson, Roger Kelke, Chambers, Isaac, both Knollyses, John and Christopher Hales, Richard Hilles, Bartholomew Traheron, Robert Crowley, Thomas Cole, William Turner, Robert Wisdome. An informal university established by the congregation had Horne teaching Hebrew, John Mullins (who came from Zurich after Knox left) teaching Greek, and Traheron teaching theology. Thomas Beccon came from Strasbourg to Frankfurt; he taught at Marburg University around 1556–1559.

All records of the group were destroyed in World War II with the Frankfurt city archives, and only partial transcripts from prior scholarship remain. These records disclose that native Frankfurters distrusted the English and suspected they were being used by members of the nobility to diminish the privileges of the burghers. The English were also accused of unfair commercial practices and of competing with local artisans—accusations which led to detailed censuses of the immigrants.

=== Troubles at Frankfurt ===
The organizational and liturgical differences between the English churches in exile soon led to protracted conflicts concentrated in Frankfurt. A particular clash between Richard Cox and John Knox came in time to stand for the general struggle between the Church of England and Presbyterian views.

== Geneva ==
Led mainly by Knox, the largest, most politically and theologically radical concentration of English exiles was at Geneva, reaching a peak of 233 people or about 140 households. (This was approximately 2% of the city's population.)

This was the first English congregation to adopt the wholly Presbyterian form of discipline and worship that was resisted in Frankfurt. Sometimes titled Book of Our Common Order, it is the basis for the modern Book of Common Order used by Presbyterian churches.

The English church in Geneva was also the scene of the Geneva Bible's production, which was to be the most popular English version of the era and the most notorious for its annotations that supported Reformed theology and resistance theory. At Geneva Knox wrote his infamous First Blast of the Trumpet Blowen Against the Monstrous Regiment of Women during the winter of 1557–58. Published in Geneva in the spring 1558, it denounced all female rulers in the most strident language. This was opposed by many other English exiles, especially those seeking favor with Elizabeth I, such as John Aylmer, who published a retort to Knox called Harborowe for Faithful and True Subjects in 1559. Christopher Goodman took a more circumspect approach in a How superior powers ought to be obeyd of their subjects & wherein they may lawfully by Gods Worde be disobeyed & resisted, for which Whittingham wrote the preface. Laurence Humphrey, working out of Strasbourg, claimed to be clarifying what Knox, Ponet, and Goodman really meant when he defended passive resistance only and supported the legitimacy of female rule in De religionis conservatione et reformatione vera (1559).

John Calvin proposed that the English exiles should hold their own services in the building where he delivered lectures, later known as the Calvin Auditory. This worship in English continues in the building to the present day, under the Church of Scotland.

Members of the English church in Geneva included Sir William Stafford, James Pilkington, John Scory, Thomas Bentham, William Cole, William Kethe, Thomas Sampson and John Pullein.

== See also ==
- Puritanism
- Anglicanism
- Protestantism
- Vestments controversy
- Elizabethan Religious Settlement
- The Protestant Reformation

== Sources ==
Primary

- A Briefe Discourse of the Troubles begun at Frankeford in Germany (1575)
- John Knox, Of the Proceedings of the English Congregation at Frankfurt, in March 1555.
- John Strype, Annals of the Reformation.
- John Brett, A Narrative of the Pursuit of English Refugees in Germany Under Queen Mary.

Secondary

- William D. Maxwell, The Liturgical Portions of the Genevan Service Book used by John Knox While a Minister of the English Congregation of Marian Exiles at Geneva, 1556–1559. (London: The Faith Press, 1965.) [First published by Oliver and Boyd, 1931.]
- Frederick A. Norwood, "The Marian Exiles—Denizens or Sojourners?" Church History 13:2 (June 1944): 100–110.
- Brett Usher, "The Deanery of Bocking and the Demise of the Vestiarian Controversy," Journal of Ecclesiastical History 52.3 (July 2001): 434–455.
- Ronald J. Vander Molen, "Anglican Against Puritan: Ideological Origins during the Marian Exile," Church History 42.1 (March 1973): 45–57.
- Jonathan Wright, "Marian Exiles and the Legitimacy of Flight From Persecution," Journal of Ecclesiastical History 52.2 (April 2001): 220–43.
