= Edmund Gheast =

English cleric

The Right Reverend Edmund Gheast
- Bishop of Salisbury
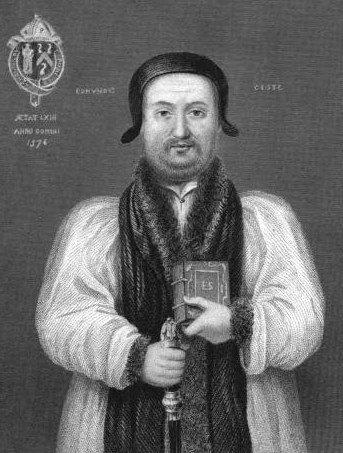
- Church: Church of England
- Diocese: Diocese of Salisbury
- Elected: 1571
- Term ended: 1577 (death)
- Other post: Bishop of Rochester (1560–1571)

Orders
- Consecration: 24 March 1560 by Matthew Parker

Personal details
- Born: 1514 Northallerton, Yorkshire
- Died: 1577 (aged 62–63)
- Buried: Salisbury Cathedral
- Denomination: Anglican
- Parents: Thomas Geste
- Education: King's College, Cambridge

Edmund Gheast (also known as Guest, Geste or Gest; 1514–1577) was a cleric of the Church of England who was bishop of Rochester and then Salisbury.

== Life ==
Guest was born at Northallerton, Yorkshire, the son of Thomas Geste. He was educated at York Grammar School and Eton College and became a scholar of King's College, Cambridge in 1536 (fellow from 1539 to 1554, BA in 1541, MA in 1544, BD in 1551).

He was chaplain to Archbishop Matthew Parker who made him Archdeacon of Canterbury (1559–1564) and Rector of Cliffe, Kent. He became Bishop of Rochester in 1560, holding the office of Archdeacon of Canterbury in commendam. He was then Bishop of Salisbury from 1571 to his death in 1577. He was buried in Salisbury Cathedral.

Guest participated actively in the Convocation of 1563 that met under Archbishop Matthew Parker to revise the Forty-Two Articles. Convocation passed only 39 of the 42, and Queen Elizabeth reduced the number to 38 by throwing out Article XXIX to avoid offending the Roman Catholic party. In 1571, the XXIXth Article, despite the opposition of Guest, was inserted, to the effect that the wicked do not eat the Body of Christ. The Thirty-Nine Articles were ratified by the Queen, and the bishops and clergy were required to assent.

Church of England titles
Preceded by Edmund Allen	Bishop of Rochester; 1560–1571	Succeeded by Edmund Freke
Preceded by John Jewel	Bishop of Salisbury; 1571–1577	Succeeded by John Piers
