= Book of Common Prayer (1552) =

Second Anglican prayer book

Title page of the 1552 Book of Common Prayer

The 1552 Book of Common Prayer, also called the Second Prayer Book of Edward VI, was the second version of the Book of Common Prayer (BCP) and contained the official liturgy of the Church of England from November 1552 until July 1553. The first Book of Common Prayer was issued in 1549 as part of the English Reformation, but Protestants criticised it for being too similar to traditional Roman Catholic services. The 1552 prayer book was revised to be explicitly Reformed in its theology.

During the reign of Mary I, Roman Catholicism was restored, and the prayer book's official status was repealed. When Elizabeth I reestablished Protestantism as the official religion, the 1559 Book of Common Prayer—a revised version of the 1552 prayer book—was issued as part of the Elizabethan Religious Settlement. It was this pattern which formed the basis for the 1662 Book of Common Prayer, which remains the official liturgical book of the Church of England.

== Prayer book revision ==
The first Book of Common Prayer was published in 1549 during the reign of Edward VI. Compiled by Archbishop Thomas Cranmer, the prayer book was a Protestant liturgy meant to replace the Roman Rite. In the prayer book, the Latin Mass—the central act of medieval worship—was replaced with an English-language communion service. Overall, the prayer book moved the Church of England's theology in a Lutheran direction.

Cranmer believed it was better to implement reforms slowly and cautiously. As a result, the first prayer book included a number of concessions to traditionalists within the Church of England. The use of sacramentals was preserved, as was the blessing and exorcism of objects and people. Priests were still required to wear traditional vestments, such as the cope, and they continued to celebrate the Eucharist on stone altars. The funeral service included prayers for the dead. Conservative clergy used the prayer book's traditional features to make the liturgy resemble the Latin Mass, and this led Protestants both in England and abroad to criticise it for being susceptible to Roman Catholic re-interpretation.

Protestants disliked the term priest and the continued use of altars since both implied the Eucharist was a sacrifice. This was the teaching of the Roman Catholic Church but was considered heresy by the reformers. By 1550, Protestant bishops were replacing stone altars with wooden communion tables, and the Privy Council eventually ordered altars to be removed throughout the nation. Nicholas Ridley explained that "The use of an altar is to make sacrifice upon it; the use of a table is to serve for men to eat upon." In a sermon given at court, John Hooper preached "as long as the altars remain, both the ignorant people, and the ignorant and evil-persuaded priest, will dream always of sacrifice".

Cranmer began revising the prayer book as early as the winter of 1549–1550. In late 1549, the Convocation of Canterbury discussed various issues with the book. In 1550, both Martin Bucer and Peter Martyr Vermigli provided critiques of the prayer book, with Bucer identifying 60 problems with it. Martyr's recommendations are now lost, but he wrote an exhortation to receive communion that was incorporated into the new prayer book. Valerand Poullain might have been another influence on the prayer book revision. The revised version included a recitation of the Ten Commandments by the minister at the beginning of the communion service. This was similar to the practice of Poullain's French refugee congregation at Glastonbury. Stephen Gardiner's Explication and Assertion of the True Catholic Faith offered a Roman Catholic interpretation of the 1549 prayer book, and Cranmer responded by removing those elements that Gardiner approved of to make the book more Protestant. In April 1552, Parliament passed the Act of Uniformity that authorised the revised Book of Common Prayer to be used in worship by All Saints' Day, 1 November.

== Content ==
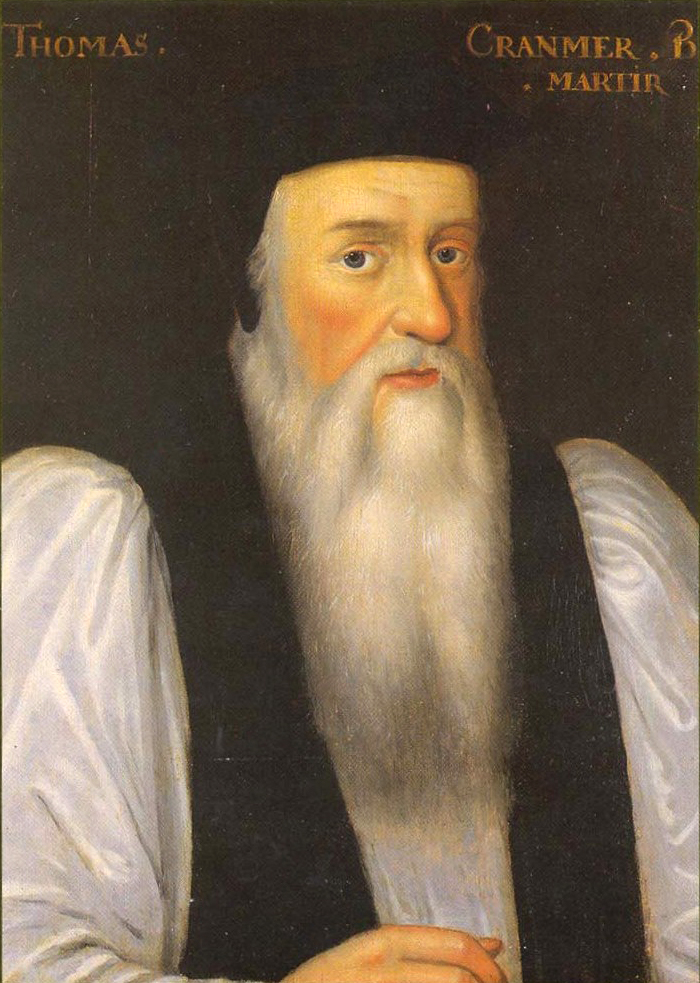
Thomas Cranmer, Archbishop of Canterbury, primary author of the 1552 Book of Common Prayer

The first Book of Common Prayer was written at a time when it was necessary to compromise with conservative bishops. At the time, Cranmer felt that gradual change was the best approach "lest the people, not having yet learned Christ, should be deterred by too extensive innovations from embracing his religion". By 1551, conservative opposition had been removed, and the 1552 Prayer Book "broke decisively with the past" in the words of historian Christopher Haigh. The services for baptism, confirmation, communion and burial were rewritten, and ceremonies hated by Protestants were removed.

Unlike the 1549 version, the 1552 prayer book removed many traditional sacramentals and observances that reflected belief in the blessing and exorcism of people and objects. In the baptism service, infants no longer received minor exorcism. Anointing was no longer included in the services for baptism, ordination and visitation of the sick. These ceremonies were altered to emphasise the importance of faith, rather than trusting in rituals or objects.

=== Liturgical calendar ===
The liturgical calendar was relatively unchanged from the 1549 BCP. The church year started with Advent and was followed by Christmas and the Epiphany season. Ash Wednesday began the season of Lent and was followed by Holy Week, the Easter season, Ascensiontide, Whitsun, and Trinity Sunday. Only feasts honoring New Testament saints were kept in the 1549 BCP. But the 1552 BCP reintroduced three non-biblical saints (Saint George, Saint Lawrence and Saint Clement of Rome). It also reintroduced Lammas Day, which had originally commemorated the liberation of Saint Peter but in England was an agricultural festival. The feast day of Saint Mary Magdalene was removed from the calendar. The following saints were commemorated:

- Circumcision of Christ, Epiphany and conversion of St. Paul in January
- Purification of the Virgin Mary and St. Matthias in February
- Annunciation in March
- St. George and St. Mark the Evangelist in April
- St. Philip and St. James in May
- St. Barnabas, the Nativity of St. John the Baptist, and Saint Peter in June
- St. James the Apostle in July
- Lammas Day, St. Lawrence and St. Bartholomew the Apostle in August
- St. Matthew and Michael and All Angels in September
- St. Luke the Evangelist, St. Simon and St. Jude in October
- All Saints' Day, St. Clement of Rome and St. Andrew the Apostle in November
- St. Thomas the Apostle, St. Stephen, St. John the Evangelist, and Holy Innocents Day in December

The calendar included what is now called the lectionary, which specified the parts of the Bible to be read at each service. For Cranmer, the main purpose of the liturgy was to familiarise people with the Bible. He wanted a congregation to read through the whole Bible in a year. The scripture readings for the daily office followed lectio continua. For Morning and Evening Prayer, the lessons did not change if it was a saints' day. The readings for Holy Communion did change if it was a feast day. This became a problem when a moveable feast fell on the same day as a fixed feast, but the prayer book provided no instructions for determining which feast to celebrate. Directions for solving this issue were not added to the BCP until the 1662 prayer book.

=== Morning and evening prayer ===
The Orders of Morning and Evening Prayer were extended by the inclusion of a penitential section at the beginning including a corporate confession of sin and a general absolution, although the text was printed only in Morning Prayer with rubrical directions to use it in the evening as well. The general pattern of Bible reading in 1549 was retained (as it was in the 1559 prayer book) except that distinct Old and New Testament readings were now specified for Morning and Evening Prayer on certain feast days. Following the publication of the 1552 Prayer Book, a revised English Primer was published in 1553; adapting the Offices and Morning and Evening Prayer, and other prayers, for lay domestic piety.

=== Holy Communion ===
The 1552 prayer book removed many of the traditional elements in the 1549 prayer book, moving the communion service in a more Reformed direction. The name of the service was changed to "The Order for the Administration of the Lord's Supper or Holy Communion", removing the word Mass. Stone altars were replaced with communion tables positioned in the chancel or nave, with the priest standing on the north side. The priest was to wear the surplice instead of traditional Mass vestments. The service appears to promote a spiritual presence view of the Eucharist, meaning that Christ is spiritually but not corporally present.

The priest began the service by praying the Collect for Purity. Unlike the 1549 service (which featured the singing of an introit psalm, the Kyrie and the Gloria), the new service directed the priest to recite the Ten Commandments. After each commandment, the congregation responded with "Lord have mercy upon us, and incline our hearts to keep this law." As in the 1549 service, the priest then said the collect of the day and a collect for the king. This was followed by the Epistle and Gospel readings assigned for the day. The Nicene Creed was then recited. After the creed, a sermon or reading from the First Book of Homilies would follow. After the sermon, money was collected for the poor, but this was not called an offertory as it had been in the 1549 book. After the collection, the priest prayed for the church militant on earth—a departure from 1549 in which the priest also prayed for those who had died.

Then those receiving communion knelt for the general confession of sin and received absolution from the priest. Following the absolution, the priest quoted the "comfortable words" from Matthew 11:28, John 3:16, 1 Timothy 1:15 and 1 John 2:1–2. Then followed the Sursum corda, preface and Sanctus (without the Benedictus). The theme of lifting up hearts to God appealed to the Reformed belief in meeting Christ spiritually in heaven. After the Sanctus, the priest knelt at the communion table and prayed in the name of all the communicants the Prayer of Humble Access.

Unlike the 1549 service, there was no consecration or blessing of the bread and wine. Rather, the priest prayed that the communicants might receive the body and blood of Christ:

Almighty God, our heavenly Father, which of thy tender mercy didst give thine only Son Jesus Christ to suffer death upon the Cross for our redemption; who made there (by his one oblation of himself once offered) a full, perfect, and sufficient sacrifice, oblation, and satisfaction for the sins of the whole world; and did institute, and in his holy Gospel command us to continue a perpetual memory of that his precious death, until his coming again; Hear us, O merciful Father, we beseech thee; and grant that we receiving these thy creatures of bread and wine, according to thy Son our Saviour Jesu Christ's holy institution, in remembrance of his death and passion, may be partakers of his most blessed body and blood . . .

After this prayer, the words of institution were said and then communion took place with communicants kneeling. There was controversy over how people should receive communion: kneeling or seated. John Knox protested against kneeling. Ultimately, it was decided that communicants should continue to kneel, but the Privy Council ordered that the Black Rubric be added to the prayer book to clarify the purpose of kneeling. The rubric denied "any real and essential presence ... of Christ's natural flesh and blood" in the Eucharist and was the clearest statement of Eucharistic theology in the prayer book. The 1552 service removed any reference to the "body of Christ" in the words of administration to reinforce the teaching that Christ's presence in the Eucharist was a spiritual presence and, in the words of Marshall, "limited to the subjective experience of the communicant".

Words of Administration
1549	1552
Sacramental Bread: The body of our Lord Jesus Christ, which was given for thee, preserve thy body and soul unto everlasting life.; Sacramental Wine: The blood of our Lord Jesus Christ, which was shed for thee, preserve thy body and soul unto everlasting life.	Sacramental Bread: Take and eat this in remembrance that Christ died for thee, and feed on him in thy heart by faith, with thanksgiving.; Sacramental Wine: Drink this in remembrance that Christ’s blood was shed for thee, and be thankful.

Instead of unleavened wafers, the prayer book instructed that ordinary bread was to be used "to take away the superstition which any person hath, or might have". To further emphasise there was no holiness in the bread and wine, any leftovers were to be taken home by the curate for ordinary consumption. This prevented eucharistic adoration of the reserved sacrament above the high altar. After communion, the priest prayed the Lord's Prayer. For the prayer that followed, the BCP provided two options: "either a thanksgiving prayer, as in the first Prayer Book, or a prayer offering praise, thanksgiving, and self-oblation in words which in that book had belonged to the eucharistic prayer." The service concluded with the Gloria (which in the 1549 service was sung at the beginning) and a blessing.

=== Baptism ===
In the Middle Ages, the church taught that children were born with original sin and that only baptism could remove it. Baptism was, therefore, essential to salvation. It was feared that children who died without baptism faced eternal damnation or limbo. A priest would perform an infant baptism soon after birth on any day of the week, but in cases of emergency, a midwife could baptise a child at birth. The traditional baptism service was long and repetitive. It was also spoken in Latin. The priest only spoke English when exhorting the godparents.

To Cranmer, baptism and the Eucharist were the only dominical sacraments (sacraments instituted by Christ himself) and of equal importance. Cranmer did not believe that baptism was absolutely necessary for salvation, but he did believe it was ordinarily necessary and to refuse baptism would be a rejection of God's grace. In agreement with Reformed theology, however, Cranmer believed that salvation was determined by God's unconditional election, which was predestined. If an infant was one of the elect, dying unbaptised would not affect the child's salvation. The prayer book made public baptism the norm, so a congregation could observe and be reminded of their own baptism. In cases of emergency, a private baptism could be performed at home.

The 1552 rite furthered the process of simplifying the baptism service begun in the 1549 book. While the 1549 service began at the church door and then moved inside to the baptismal font, the 1552 service took place entirely at the font. The priest began with this exhortation:

Dearly beloved, for as much as all men be conceived and born in sin, and that our Saviour Christ saith, none can enter into the kingdom of God (except he be regenerate and born anew of water and the holy Ghost); I beseech you to call upon God the father through our Lord Jesus Christ, that of his bounteous mercy, he will grant to these children, that thing which by nature they cannot have, that they may be Baptized with water and the holy ghost, and received into Christ's holy church, and be made lively members of the same.

The priest then said a prayer, based on one originally composed by Luther, on the theme of Noah's deliverance from the flood:

Almighty and everlasting God, which of thy great mercy diddest save Noah and his family in the Ark from perishing by water: and also diddest safely lead the children of Israel, thy people through the red Sea: figuring thereby thy holy Baptism and by the Baptism of thy well beloved son Jesus Christ, diddest sanctify the flood Jordan, and all other waters, to the mystical washing away of sin: We beseech thee for thy infinite mercies, that thou wilt mercifully look upon these children, sanctify them and wash them with thy holy ghost, that they, being delivered from thy wrath, may be received into the Ark of Christ's Church, and being steadfast in faith, joyful through hope, and rooted in charity, may so pass the waves of this troublesome world, that finally they may come to the land of everlasting life, there to reign with thee, world without end, through Jesus Christ our Lord. Amen.

The congregation then prayed "Receive [these infants] (O Lord) as thou hast promised by thy well beloved son, ... that these infants may enjoy the everlasting benediction of thy heavenly washing, and may come to the eternal Kingdom which thou hast promised by Christ our Lord." At this point in the 1549 rite, the priest would have performed a minor exorcism on the infant, but this was omitted in the 1552 service. The theme of God receiving the child continued with the gospel reading (Mark 10) and the minister's exhortation, which was probably intended to repudiate Anabaptist teachings against infant baptism. The congregation then prayed that the baptismal candidates receive the Holy Spirit:

Almighty and everlasting God, heavenly father, we give thee humble thanks, that thou hast vouchsafed to call us to the knowledge of thy grace, and faith in thee: increase this knowledge, and confirm this faith in us evermore: Give thy holy spirit to these infants, that they may be born again, and be made heirs of everlasting salvation, through our Lord Jesus Christ: who liveth and reigneth with thee and the holy spirit, now and for ever. Amen.

Baptismal vows were made by the godparents on behalf of the child, renouncing the devil, the world and the flesh. The godparents also affirmed belief in the Apostles' Creed. This was followed by a series of prayers taken from the blessing of the font in the 1549 book (which was omitted in the new book), ending as follows:

Almighty ever living God, whose most dearly beloved son Jesus Christ, for the forgiveness of our sins, did shed out of his most precious side both water and blood, and gave commandment to his disciples that they should go teach all nations, and baptize them in the name of the father, the son, and of the holy ghost: Regard, we beseech thee, the supplications of thy congregation, and grant that all thy servants which shall be baptized in this water, may receive the fullness of thy grace, and ever remain in the number of thy faithful and elect children, through Jesus Christ our Lorde. Amen.

At this point, the child was baptised and received into the congregation. The child was dipped once, not three times as in the 1549 service. The priest made the sign of the cross on the infant's forehead, representing faith and obedience to Christ. Unlike in the 1549 book, the child was not anointed with chrism oil nor dressed in the white chrisom robe. The rite concluded with the Lord's Prayer, a prayer of thanksgiving, and an exhortation to the godparents on their duties toward the child.

== After 1553 ==
Edward VI died in 1553 and was succeeded by Mary I, who was determined to restore England to Roman Catholicism. With her accession in July 1553, the BCP was discontinued. However, it was in official use for about a year, until it lost legal status with the First Statute of Repeal. As soon as she could do so, Mary restored union with Rome. The Latin Mass was re-established, altars, roods and statues of saints were reinstated in an attempt to restore the English Church to its Roman affiliation. Worship according to the 1552 prayer book was relegated to secret meetings and a few Scottish parishes. Cranmer was punished for his work in the English Reformation by being burned at the stake on 21 March 1556. Nevertheless, the prayer book was to survive.

Hundreds of English Protestants fled into exile, establishing an English church in Frankfurt am Main. A bitter and very public dispute ensued between those, such as Edmund Grindal and Richard Cox, who wished to preserve in exile the exact form of worship of the 1552 Prayer Book, and those, such as John Knox the minister of the congregation, who regarded that book as still partially tainted with compromise (see Troubles at Frankfurt). Eventually, in 1555, the civil authorities expelled Knox and his supporters to Geneva, where they adopted a new prayer book, The Form of Prayers, which derived principally from Calvin's French-language La Forme des Prières. Consequently, when the accession of Elizabeth I re-asserted the dominance of the Reformed Church of England, there remained a significant body of more Protestant believers who were nevertheless hostile to the Book of Common Prayer. John Knox took The Form of Prayers with him to Scotland, where it formed the basis of the Scottish Book of Common Order.

Mary I was succeeded as queen by her Protestant half-sister, Elizabeth I. Elizabeth reversed Mary's religious policies and re-established the Church of England as a Protestant church. As part of the Elizabethan Religious Settlement, the 1552 Book of Common Prayer was revised and reauthorised as the 1559 prayer book.

== See also ==
- Forty-two Articles
