= William Whittingham =

English Puritan, Marian exile, and translator of the Geneva Bible

William Whittingham (c. 1524–1579) was an English Puritan, a Marian exile, and a translator of the Geneva Bible. He was well connected to the circles around John Knox, Heinrich Bullinger and John Calvin, and firmly resisted the continuance of the English liturgy during the Marian exile. At last, he was ordained by the Presbyterians in Geneva. Upon his return to England, he became a well-known opponent to the rites of the Church of England. Through the patronage of the Earl of Leicester, he was collated to the Deanery of Durham, but in 1579 action was started to deprive him of all holy orders on account of his Presbyterian ordination. The process of deprivation was in under way when Whittingham died in 1579. The full record of Whittingham's appointment and trial may be found in Strype's Annals, II.ii., pp. 167, 168, 620.

== Early life ==
Born at Chester about 1524, he was son of William Whittingham, by his wife, a daughter of Haughton of Hoghton Tower, Lancashire. In 1540, at the age of sixteen, he entered Brasenose College, Oxford, graduating B.A. and being elected fellow of All Souls' College in 1545. In 1547 he became senior student of Christ Church, Oxford earning the M.A. on 5 Feb 1547–8. On 17 May 1550, he was granted leave to travel for three years to study languages and civil law. He went to France, where he spent his time chiefly at the University of Orleans, but he also visited Lyon and studied at Paris, where his services as interpreter were used by the English ambassador, Sir John Mason or Sir William Pickering.

Towards the end of 1552 Whittingham visited universities in Germany and Geneva. He briefly returned to England in May 1553. Whittingham had adopted radical Puritan views, but the accession of Queen Mary, the return of Anglo-Italian ecclesiastical policies of De Haeretico Comburendo in the form of Cardinal Pole's repatriation to England, and the vulnerabilities and liabilities associated with burnings-to-come (e.g. William Tyndale, 1536), anticipated persecutions, interfered with hopes of usefulness in ministerial labours. Late in August, however, he made intercession, which was ultimately successful, for the release of Peter Martyr; but after a few weeks he himself left England with difficulty by way of Dover to France.

== At Frankfort ==
In the spring of 1554 Frankfort was the ecclesiastical centre for the English Marian exiles on the continent, and Whittingham was one of the first who reached the city on 27 June 1554; he sent out invitations to exiles in other cities to join them. Difficulties soon arose, however, between the party led by Whittingham and John Knox which sought to abolish all English liturgies and adopt the Genevan and Presbyterian mode of worship; and those who sought to retain the Anglican Prayerbooks, in particular Edward VI's second prayer-book. Whittingham was one of those appointed to draw up a service-book. He procured a letter from John Calvin, dated 18 January 1555, which prevailed; but the compromise adopted was disturbed by the arrival and public disruptions of Richard Cox, an uncompromising champion of the 1552 Book of Common Prayer. In the party with Cox was John Jewel, the famed later bishop of Salisbury, who resolutely opposed Whittingham and Knox in their program. In the ensuing struggle between the two parties, Whittingham was Knox's chief supporter. However, he failed to prevent Knox's expulsion from Frankfort on 26 March; he gave his support to the form of church government established at Frankfort under Cox's influence. He was dissatisfied with the outcome, however. About 22 September 1555, he followed Knox to Geneva, a veritable beehive of growing scholarship and, in time, international influence. There, he was ordained in the Presbyterian manner.

Whittingham's 1575 text, entitled 'A Brieff Discours off the Troubles begonne at Franckford in Germany, anno Domini 1554. Abowte the Booke off Common Prayer and Ceremonies, and continued by the Englishe men theyre to thende off Q. Maries Raigne,' offers a narrative account of this issue in the Historie. It is of note, that the Historie also includes a later controversy were a conservative minority resisted the adoption of a reformed new discipline.

=== 'A Brieff Discours off the Troubles begonne at Franckford': ===
Traditionally considered written by William Whittingham in 1575, this text was printed in two editions in 1574 and 1575 by Michael Schirat of Heidelberg. This process was performed in the same type as Thomas Cartwright's A Full and Plaine Declaration of Ecclesiasticall Disicpline owt off thw word off God (1574) and his 1575 Second Replie; one copy of the original edition is dated mdlxxiv. It was reprinted at London in 1642, in vol. ii. of 'The Phenix,' 1708; again in 1846 (ed. M'Crie), and in vol. iv. of 'Knox's Works' (Bannatyne Club).

Whittingham's authorship of A Brieff Discours is contested with recent scholarship suggesting Thomas Wood as a more suitable alternative. Historiographical criticisms of Whittingham's position emerged from the reaction of older puritan leaders to proposed reforms presented in the Admonition of Parliament by John Field and Thomas Wilcox. These veteran reformers, including Whittingham, either openly condemned Field and Willcox's ideas or stopped actively participating in the English Reform movement entirely. Thus it has been questioned whether Whittingham would have readily associated himself with this Puritan party at the time A Brieff Discours was published.

== At Geneva ==
On 16 December 1555, and again in December 1556, Whittingham was elected a Presbyterian elder; on 16 December 1558, he was ordained as a deacon, and in 1559 he succeeded Knox as Presbyterian minister at Calvin's insistence. Upon Queen Mary's death, most of the exiles at Geneva returned to England, but Whittingham remained to complete the translation of the Geneva Bible. He had laboured with other scholars in the review of earlier English editions—Tyndale's, Coverdale's, the Thomas Matthew's Bible and other versions. He had already produced a version of the New Testament, which was issued at Geneva by Conrad Badius on 10 June 1557. He also took part in the minor revisions of the Old Testament. The critical and explanatory notes were largely textual and explanatory. It was printed at Geneva by Rowland Hall in 1560; after 1611, its popularity was not lost. More than 150 editions were printed up to 1644. It was an influential version for at least one hundred years. By the 17th century, as Laudian influences would gain ascendancy, all-things-Genevan grew to be condemned.

Besides the translation of the Bible, Whittingham issued metrical versions some of Psalms. Seven of these were included among the fifty-one psalms published at Geneva in 1556; others were revised versions of Thomas Sternhold's psalms. A metrical rendering of the Ten Commandments by Whittingham was appended. Another edition of 1558, now lost, is believed to have contained nine fresh psalms of Whittingham; these were reprinted in the edition of 1561, to which Whittingham also contributed a version of the 'Song of Simeon' and two of the Lord's Prayer. Besides these, Whittingham translated four psalms in the Scottish psalter. These do not appear in any English edition. Whittingham revised for press Knox's work on predestination, published at Geneva in 1560. He contributed a dedicatory epistle to Christopher Goodman's 'How Superior Powers ought to be obeyed' (Geneva, 1558). As well, he was the Latin translator of the martyr Nicholas Ridley's 'Brief Declaration of the Lord's Supper' (Oxford, 1555); regarding his translation, a recent editor of the Declaration said this:

"... the Latin Version, to a reader who has learnt to love Ridley's noble combination of courage and decision with fairness of thought and restraint of expression, is a painful study. Its diffuseness is such as to make it much more a parahprase than a version; and this diffuseness is largely displayed in the rendering of Ridley's quiet English into an embittered rhetoric, or in quite gratuitous and disputable additions. A few examples may suffice..."

== Return to England ==
Whittingham took formal leave of the council at Geneva on 30 May 1560. In January 1561, he was appointed to attend Francis Russell, 2nd Earl of Bedford during his embassy to the French court. In the following year he became a chaplain to Ambrose Dudley, 3rd Earl of Warwick, a minister at Le Havre, then occupied by the English under Warwick. He won general praise; but William Cecil complained of his neglect of conformity to the English Book of Common Prayer. Owing to the support of Warwick and Robert Dudley, 1st Earl of Leicester, another Puritan sympathizer, Whittingham was collated on 19 July 1563 to the deanery of Durham.

In keeping with his past, Whittingham took his duties seriously, holding two services a day, devoting time to his grammar school and song school, and church music. Before the outbreak of the Rising of the North in 1569 he unsuccessfully urged James Pilkington, the bishop of Durham, to put the city in a state of defence, but he was more successful at Newcastle, which resisted the rebels. In 1572, when Lord Burghley became lord treasurer, Whittingham was suggested, probably by Leicester, as his successor in the office of secretary. In 1577, Leicester also promised Whittingham aid in securing the see of York or Durham, both being vacant; but Whittingham did not press for preferment.

== A Dean of Durham ==
In 1564, Whittingham wrote a long letter to Leicester protesting against the 'old popish apparel' and the historic associations with Massing-vestments and theology. He refused to wear the surplice and cope, and proceedings by Church officials were begun against him in 1566. Whittingham eventually yielded, taking Calvin's moderating advice not to leave the ministry for external and minor matters of order. In 1577, however, he incurred the enmity of Edwin Sandys, the new archbishop of York, by resisting his claim to visit Durham Cathedral. According to William Hutchinson a commission had been issued in 1576 or 1577 to examine complaints against him. But this proved ineffectual because the Earl of Huntingdon and Matthew Hutton sided with the dean against the third commissioner, Sandys. A fresh commission was issued on 14 May 1578. This included the three former commissioners and about a dozen others.

The articles against Whittingham are printed from the domestic state papers in the 'Camden Miscellany'; the charge that 'he is defamed of adulterie' is entered as 'partly proved' and that of drunkenness as 'proved;' but the real allegation against Whittingham was the alleged inadequacy and invalidity of his ordination in Geneva. He admitted to not having been ordained according to the rites of the church of England. Archbishop Sandys further added that Whittingham had not even been validly ordained even according to Genevan standards, but had been elected preacher without the imposition of hands. Huntingdon repudiated the Archbishop and suggested a stay of the proceedings against Whittingham, arguing that 'it could not but be ill-taken of all the godly learned both at home and in all the reformed churches abroad, that we should allow of the popish massing priests in our ministry, and disallow of the ministers made in a reformed church'. However Archbishop Richard Bancroft, in 'Dangerous Positions', referred to him as 'afterward unworthily Dean of Durham', and ranks him with Goodman, Gilby, and other Puritans. So does Roger L'Estrange in his violent philippic, 'The Holy Cheat'.

As the proceedings to deprive Whittingham of holy orders were proceeding, he was met with death, on 10 June 1579. He was buried in Durham Cathedral, where his tomb (ironically) was destroyed by the Presbyterian Scots in 1640. His will, dated 18 April 1579, is printed in 'Durham Wills and Inventories' (Surtees Soc. ii. 14–19).

== Family ==
Whittingham's wife Catherine, daughter of Louis Jaqueman, was probably born not before 1535 and married to Whittingham on 15 November 1556. Her eldest son, Zachary, was baptised on 17 August 1557, and her eldest daughter, Susanna, on 11 December 1558; both died young. Whittingham was survived by two sons, Sir Timothy and Daniel, and four daughters.

== Notes ==
Attribution

This article incorporates text from a publication now in the public domain: "Whittingham, William". Dictionary of National Biography. London: Smith, Elder & Co. 1885–1900.
