= Thomas Lever =

English Protestant reformer and Marian exile

Thomas Lever (Leaver, Leiver) (1521–1577) was an English Protestant reformer and Marian exile, one of the founders of the Puritan tendency in the Church of England.

== Life ==
Thomas Lever was from Little Lever, Lancashire. He graduated B.A. at St. John's College, Cambridge in 1541–2, became a Fellow there in 1543, and graduated M.A. in 1545. From 1547 he was a leader in his college, with Roger Hutchinson, in discussion of the mass and transubstantiation, disquieting the Master William Bill. He preached before Edward VI in 1550, and was himself Master of St. John's from 1551 to 1553.

He left England for exile in Zurich in 1553 on the accession of Mary I of England, where he forged a good relationship with Heinrich Bullinger. He also went to Geneva, and heard Jean Calvin lecture. He worked for a compromise at Frankfurt in the debate on the Prayer Book, where John Knox and Richard Cox held opposed views, on a committee with Knox, William Whittingham, and Thomas Parry. Knox left, and Lever became chief pastor. He was then asked by an English exile group at Wesel to lead them, and he took this congregation of about 100, working people mostly, to Aarau.

On returning to England, he was Rector and Archdeacon of Coventry from 1559. After later troubles with the church authorities, the Earl of Leicester gave him a position as Master of Sherburn Hospital. On his death in July 1577, he was buried within the alter area of the hospital chapel; he was succeeded as master by his brother Ralph Lever.

== Works ==
Thomas Lever was better known as a preacher than an author, but he published A Comment on the Lord's Prayer; several sermons (one preached in "Poule's Churche at London, in the Shroudes", two delivered before Edward VI, and another preached at Paul's Cross); and a volume with the title of A Treatise of the Right Way from the Danger of Sinne and Vengeance in this Wicked Worlde, unto Godly Wealth and Salvation in Christe.

== Notes ==
Academic offices
Preceded by William Bill	Master of St John's College, Cambridge; 1551–1553	Succeeded by Thomas Watson
