= Thomas Sampson =

English Puritan theologian (c. 1517–1589)

- Born: c. 1517; England
- Died: 1589
- Occupation: Theologian

Thomas Sampson (c. 1517–1589) was an English Puritan theologian. A Marian exile, he was one of the Geneva Bible translators. On his return to England, he had trouble with conformity to the Anglican practices. With Laurence Humphrey, he played a leading part in the vestments controversy, a division along religious party lines in the early years of the reign of Elizabeth I of England.

== Life ==
He was said to have been born at Playford, Suffolk, but possibly came from Binfield in Berkshire. He was educated at Pembroke Hall, Cambridge. In 1547 he joined the Inner Temple. He married a niece of Hugh Latimer; Latimer and Sampson influenced the conversion of John Bradford, a Marian Protestant martyr. He has been described as perhaps the most eloquent of all the new generation of evangelical preachers.

After Sampson's conversion to Protestantism in 1551, he became rector of All Hallows, Bread Street, London. When the dean of Chichester, Bartholomew Traheron, resigned in December 1552, he recommended Sampson to succeed him, calling him a preacher … of such integrity as I would be glad to see placed here and he was duly preferred to the post the following February. However Sampson was never installed: Mary Tudor's accession intervened. His arrest was ordered as early as August 1553, however, he did not move out of the country until May 1554 when he went to Strasburg.

His successor as rector at All Hallows, Laurence Saunders, was burned at the stake.

Sampson was strongly anti-Catholic throughout the rest of his life. He communicated to his parishioners his distaste for Catholic prayers for the dead.

== Elizabethan era ==
He did not return immediately upon Elizabeth's accession, waiting until 1560. In that year he became canon of Durham, and in 1561 Dean of Christ Church, Oxford.

In the controversy over clerical dress, Matthew Parker ordered the Anglican clergy to wear surplice and caps. Sampson attempted to give the debate a broader Protestant dimension, involving correspondence with Heinrich Bullinger. He was ultimately unsuccessful, since Bullinger sided with Parker. The Court of High Commission ruled against Sampson, after summoning him in 1565. He was deprived of his position as Dean, despite being thought a very effective administrator.

He subsequently held other positions. He was prebendary of St Paul's Cathedral in 1570. He became Master of Whittington College. The old College of St. Spirit and St. Mary and almshouse set up by Richard Whittington at St. Michael Paternoster Royal had been shut down, first by Edward VI and then for good by Elizabeth, but he lectured there regularly. The spectacular case of Peter Birchet, who wounded John Hawkins in 1573, mistaking him for Christopher Hatton, brought attention to Sampson, since Birchet had heard him preach on the morning of the attack. Afflicted by bad health, Sampson gave that post up. He was then appointed Master of the Hospital of William de Wygston, at Leicester.

Sampson continued to argue his position. He prepared a summary of Martin Bucer's De Regno Christi, which he passed to Lord Burghley during the 1570s. He died in Leicester in 1589, and was buried in St. Ursula's Chapel, attached to the Hospital, where his sons erected a memorial to him.

He had a daughter, Anne.
