= Richard Cox (bishop) =

Bishop of Ely

The Right Reverend Richard Cox
- Bishop of Ely
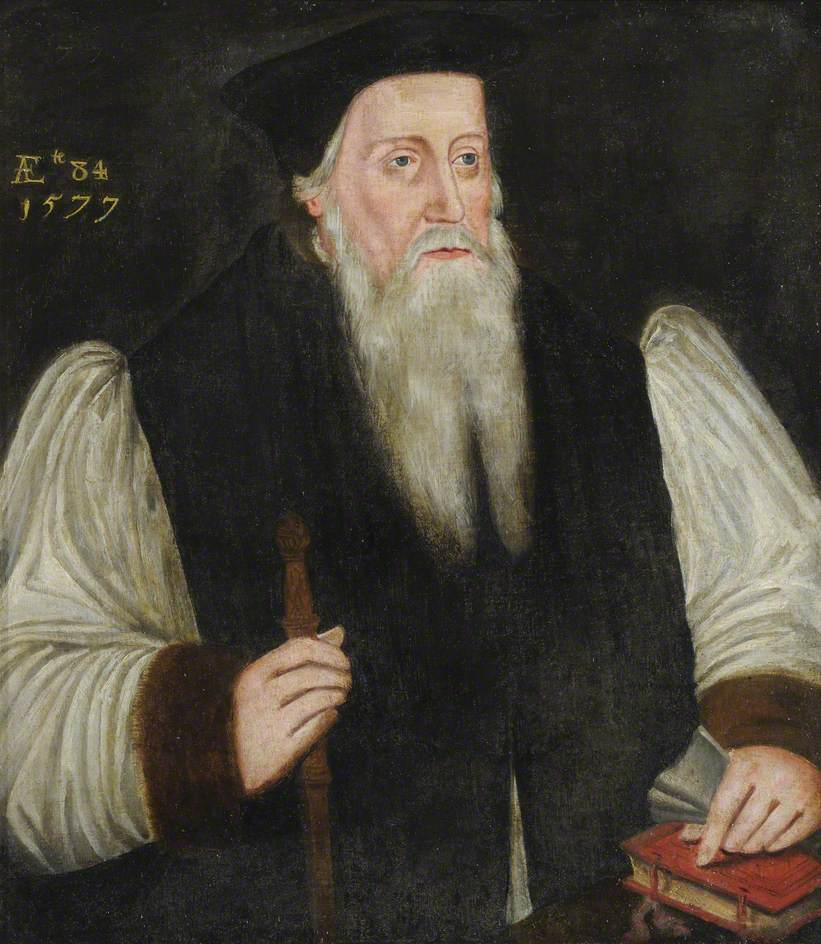
- Diocese: Diocese of Ely
- Installed: 1559
- Predecessor: Thomas Thirlby
- Successor: Martin Heton
- Other post: Dean of Westminster

Orders
- Consecration: 21 December 1559 by Matthew Parker

Personal details
- Born: c. 1500 Whaddon, Buckinghamshire
- Buried: 22 July 1581
- Denomination: Anglican
- Education: Eton College; King's College, Cambridge

Richard Cox (c. 1500 – 22 July 1581) was an English clergyman, who was Dean of Westminster and Bishop of Ely.

== Early life ==
Cox was born of obscure parentage at Whaddon, Buckinghamshire, in 1499 or 1500.

He was educated at the Benedictine Snelshall Priory near Whaddon, at Eton, and at King's College, Cambridge, where he graduated B.A. in 1524. At Cardinal Wolsey's invitation he became a member of the Cardinal's new foundation at Oxford, was incorporated B.A. in 1525, and created M.A. in 1526. In 1530 he was engaged in persuading the more unruly members of the university to approve of the King's divorce.

A premature expression of Lutheran views is said to have caused his departure from Oxford and even his imprisonment, but the records are silent on these sufferings which do not harmonise with his appointment as Master of the Royal Foundation at Eton.

In 1533 he appears as the author of an ode on the coronation of Anne Boleyn, in 1535 he graduated B.D. (Bachelor of Divinity) at Cambridge, proceeding D.D. (Doctor of Divinity) in 1537, and in the same year subscribing the Institution of a Christian Man. In 1540 he was one of the fifteen divines to whom were referred crucial questions on the sacraments and the seat of authority in the Church; his answers (printed in Pocock's Burnet, iii. 443–496) indicate a mind tending away from Catholicism, but susceptible to "The King's Doctrine"; and, indeed, Cox was one of the divines by whom Henry said the "King's Book" had been drawn up when he wished to impress upon the Regent Arran that it was not exclusively his own doing. Moreover, he was present at the examination of Robert Barnes, subscribed the divorce of Anne of Cleves, and in that year of reaction became Archdeacon and Prebendary of Ely and Canon of Westminster.

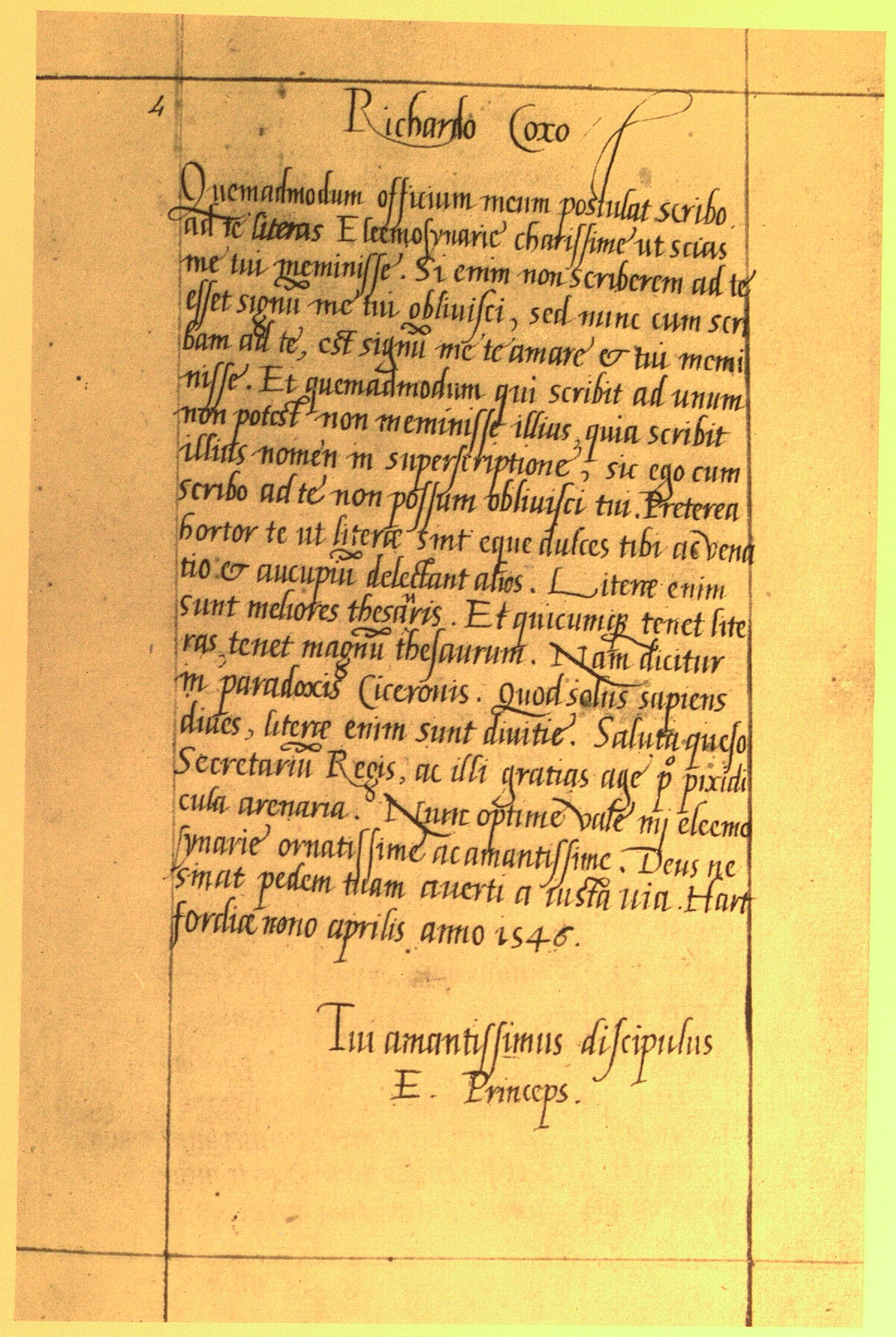
Letter from Prince Edward to Cox, 1546

He was employed on other royal business in 1541, was nominated to the projected Bishopric of Southwell, and was made King's Chaplain in 1542. In 1543 he was employed to ferret out the "Prebendaries' Plot" against Thomas Cranmer, and became the Archbishop's chancellor. In December, he was appointed Dean of Oseney (afterwards Christ Church) Oxford, and in July was made Almoner to Prince Edward, in whose education he took an active part. He was present at Edward Crome's recantation in 1546, denounced it as insincere and insufficient, and severely handled him before the Privy Council.

== Under Edward VI ==
After Edward VI's accession, Cox's opinions took a more Protestant turn, and he became one of the most active agents of the Reformation. He was consulted on the compilation of the Communion Office in 1548, and the first and second Books of Common Prayer, and sat on the Commission for the Reform of the Canon Law. As Chancellor of the University of Oxford (1547–1552) he promoted foreign divines such as Pietro Martire Vermigli, and was a moving spirit of the two commissions which sought with some success to eradicate everything savouring of popery from the books, manuscripts, ornaments and endowments of the university, and earned Cox the sobriquet of its 'Canceller' rather than its Chancellor.

He received other rewards, a canonry of Windsor (1548), the rectory of Harrow (1547) and the deanery of Westminster (1549).

== Marian exile ==
Cox lost his preferments on Mary's accession, and was for a fortnight in August 1553 confined to the Marshalsea. He remained in obscurity until after the failure of Wyatt's rebellion, and then in May 1554 escaped in the same ship as Edwin Sandys, to Antwerp. In March 1555 he made his way to Frankfurt.

Cox played a major part in what later became known as the troubles at Frankfurt. The exiles had, under the influence of John Knox and William Whittingham, adopted Calvinistic doctrine and a form of service far from the Prayer Book of 1552. Cox stood up for the Church of England service, and the exiles were divided into Knoxians and Coxians. Knox attacked Cox as a pluralist, Cox accused Knox of treason to the Emperor Charles V. The latter proved more effective as a charge: Knox and his followers were expelled, and the Prayer Book of 1552 was restored.

== Under Elizabeth I ==
In 1559 Cox returned to England, and was elected Bishop of Norwich, but the Queen changed her mind and Cox's destination to Ely, where he remained for twenty-one years. He was an honest, but narrow-minded ecclesiastic, who held what views he did hold intolerantly, and was always wanting more power to constrain those who differed from him (see his letter in Hatfield MSS. i. 308). While he refused to minister in the Queen's Chapel because of the crucifix and lights there, and was a bitter enemy of the Roman Catholics, he had little more patience with the Puritans. He was grasping, or at least tenacious of his rights in money matters, and was often brought into conflict with courtiers who coveted episcopal lands.

The Queen herself intervened, when he refused to grant Ely House to her favourite, Sir Christopher Hatton; but the well-known letter beginning "Proud Prelate" and threatening to unfrock him seems to be an impudent forgery which first saw the light in the Annual Register for 1761. It hardly, however, misrepresents the Queen's meaning, and Cox was forced to give way. These and other trials led him to resign his see in 1580, and it is significant that it remained vacant for nineteen years.

== Death and legacy ==
Cox died in July 1581; a monument erected to his memory twenty years later in Ely Cathedral was defaced, owing, it was said, to his evil repute. John Strype (Whitgift, i. 2) gives Cox's hot temper and marriage as reasons why he was not made archbishop in 1583 in preference to John Whitgift, who had been his chaplain; but Cox had been dead two years in 1583. His first wife's name is unknown; she was the mother of his five children, of whom Joanna married John Parker, the eldest son of Archbishop Matthew Parker. His second wife was Jane Auder, the widow of William Turner, the botanist and Dean of Wells Cathedral. One of his grandsons, Richard, moved to Ireland in about 1600, and was the ancestor of the Cox Baronets of Dunmanway, County Cork.

== See also ==
- List of chancellors of the University of Oxford
- Dean of Westminster

Academic offices
Preceded by John London	Dean of Christ Church, Oxford; 1543–1553	Succeeded by Richard Marshall
Preceded by John Longland	Chancellor of the University of Oxford; 1547–1552	Succeeded by John Mason
Church of England titles
Preceded by William Benson	Dean of Westminster; 1549–1553	Vacant Title next held by Hugh Weston
Preceded by Thomas Thirlby	Bishop of Ely; 1559–1581	Vacant Title next held by Martin Heton
