= Elizabethan religious settlement =

Part of England's Protestant Reformation

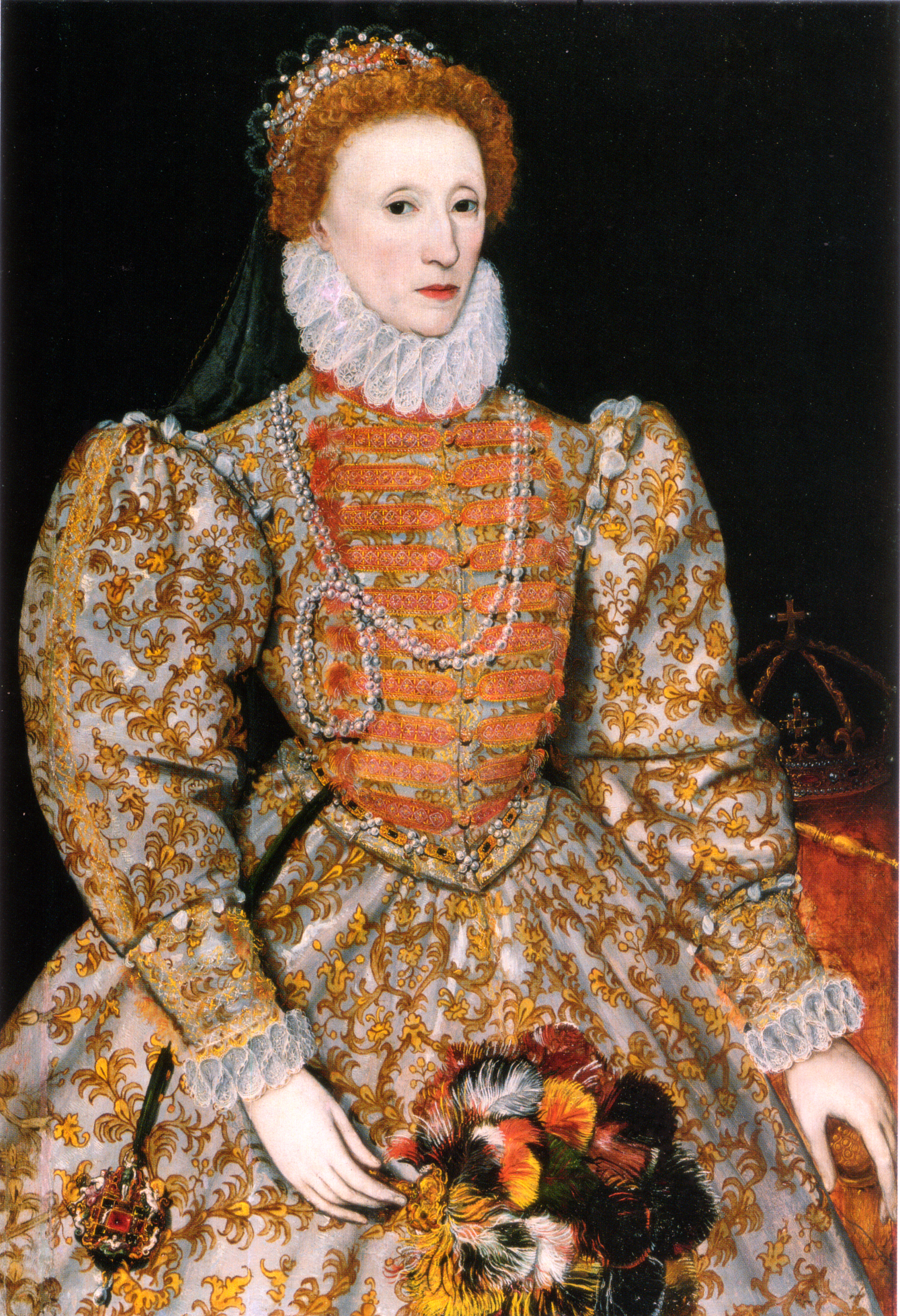
Queen Elizabeth I

The Elizabethan religious settlement was the set of religious and political arrangements made for England during the reign of Elizabeth I (1558–1603). The settlement, implemented from 1559 to 1563, marked the end of the English Reformation. It permanently shaped the Church of England's doctrine and liturgy, laying the foundation for the unique identity of Anglicanism.

When Elizabeth inherited the throne, England was bitterly divided between Catholics and Protestants as a result of various religious changes initiated by Henry VIII, Edward VI and Mary I. Henry VIII had broken from the Catholic Church and the authority of the pope, becoming the supreme head of the Church of England. During Edward's reign, the Church of England adopted a Reformed theology and liturgy. In Mary's reign, these religious policies were reversed, England was re-united with the Catholic Church and Protestantism was suppressed.

The Elizabethan settlement was an attempt to end this religious turmoil. The Act of Supremacy of 1558 re-established the Church of England's independence from Rome. Parliament conferred on Elizabeth the title of Supreme Governor of the Church of England. The Act of Uniformity 1558 re-introduced the Book of Common Prayer, which contained the liturgical services of the church. Some modifications were made to appeal to Catholics and Lutherans, including giving individuals greater latitude concerning belief in the real presence of Christ in the Eucharist and permission to use traditional priestly vestments. In 1571, the Convocations of Canterbury and York adopted the Thirty-Nine Articles as a confessional statement for the church, and a Book of Homilies was issued outlining the church's reformed theology in greater detail.

The settlement failed to end religious disputes. While most people conformed, a minority of recusants remained loyal Catholics. Within the Church of England, a Calvinist consensus developed among leading churchmen. Calvinists split between conformists and Puritans, who wanted to abolish what they considered papist abuses and replace episcopacy with a presbyterian church government. After Elizabeth's death, a high church, Arminian party gained power in the reign of Charles I and challenged the Puritans.

The English Civil War (1642–1651) and the overthrow of the monarchy allowed the Puritans to pursue their reform agenda, including dismantling the Elizabethan settlement. The Restoration in 1660 reestablished both the monarchy and the religious settlement, but the Puritans were forced out of the Church of England. Anglicans henceforth defined their church as a via media or middle way, initially between two forms of Protestantism—Lutheranism and Reformed— and later between the extremes of Catholics and Puritans.

== Background ==
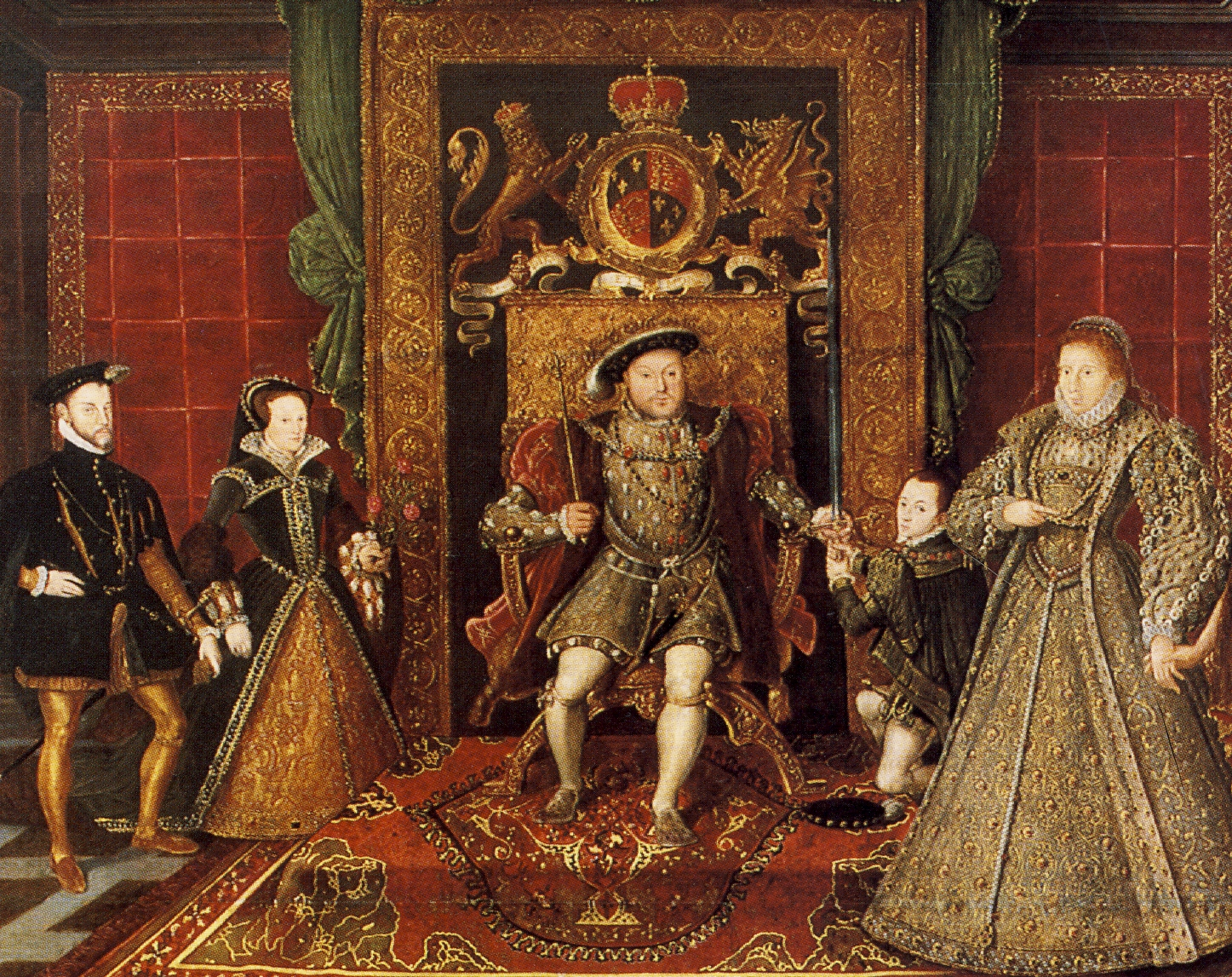
From right to left: Elizabeth I, Edward VI, Henry VIII, Mary I and her husband Philip II of Spain; an allegorical painting meant to show Queen Elizabeth I combined the best virtues of her predecessors, Henry, Edward and Mary

Elizabeth I inherited a kingdom bitterly divided over matters of religion. This division began during the reign of her father, Henry VIII. After his first wife, Catherine of Aragon, failed to produce a male heir, Henry applied to the pope for an annulment of his marriage. When his request was denied, Henry separated the Church of England from the Catholic Church and claimed that he, rather than the pope, was its supreme head on earth. Under Elizabeth's half-brother, Edward VI, the Church of England became more explicitly Protestant, projecting a "restrained" Calvinism, in the words of historian Christopher Haigh.

During Edward's reign, the Church of England preached justification by faith alone as a central teaching, in contrast to the Catholic teaching that the contrite person could cooperate with God towards their salvation by performing good works. The doctrines of purgatory, prayer for the dead and the intercession of saints were also rejected during this time. The Mass, the central act of Catholic worship, was condemned as idolatry and replaced with a Protestant communion service, a reminder of Christ's crucifixion. Christ's Real Presence in the Eucharist was no longer explained by the Catholic doctrine of transubstantiation; instead, the 1552 Book of Common Prayer promoted the Reformed teaching of Christ's spiritual presence. The veneration of religious images (icons, roods, statues) and relics were suppressed, and iconoclasm was sanctioned by the government.

Mary I, Elizabeth's half-sister, became queen in 1553. She reversed the religious innovations introduced by her father and brother. Under Mary's rule, England returned to the Catholic Church and recognised the pope's authority. Mary died in November 1558 without a Catholic heir, leaving the throne to the Protestant Elizabeth.

== Elizabeth's accession ==
Elizabeth's religious views were Protestant, though "peculiarly conservative". She also kept many of her religious views private, which can make it difficult to determine what she believed. She disliked married clergy, held Lutheran views on Eucharistic presence, and there is evidence she preferred the more ceremonial 1549 prayer book.

The Queen's principal secretary was Sir William Cecil, a moderate Protestant. Her Privy Council was filled with former Edwardian politicians, and only Protestants preached at Court.

To avoid alarming foreign Catholic observers, Elizabeth initially maintained that nothing in religion had changed. A proclamation forbade any "breach, alteration, or change of any order or usage presently established within this our realm". Nevertheless, Protestants were emboldened to practice illegal forms of worship, and a proclamation on 27 December prohibited all forms other than the Latin Mass and the English Litany. It was obvious to most that these were temporary measures. Her government's goal was to resurrect the Edwardian reforms, reinstating the Royal Injunctions of 1547, the 1552 Book of Common Prayer, and the Forty-two Articles of Religion of 1553.

Elizabeth gave her first indication of changes to come at Mass on Christmas Day 1558. Prior to the service, she instructed the celebrant, Owen Oglethorpe, bishop of Carlisle, not to elevate the host. He refused, so the Queen left the chapel before the consecration. In effect, Elizabeth was declaring that she did not believe in the doctrine of transubstantiation.

Elizabeth's coronation took place on 15 January 1559 at Westminster Abbey, and there was no elevation during the coronation Mass. The Queen returned to Westminster Abbey on 25 January for the state opening of Parliament. She was greeted by Abbot Feckenham and the other monks bearing candles in procession. Signaling her disapproval of what she considered Catholic superstition, Elizabeth told the monks, "Away with those torches, for we see very well".

== Legislation ==
=== Reformation bill ===
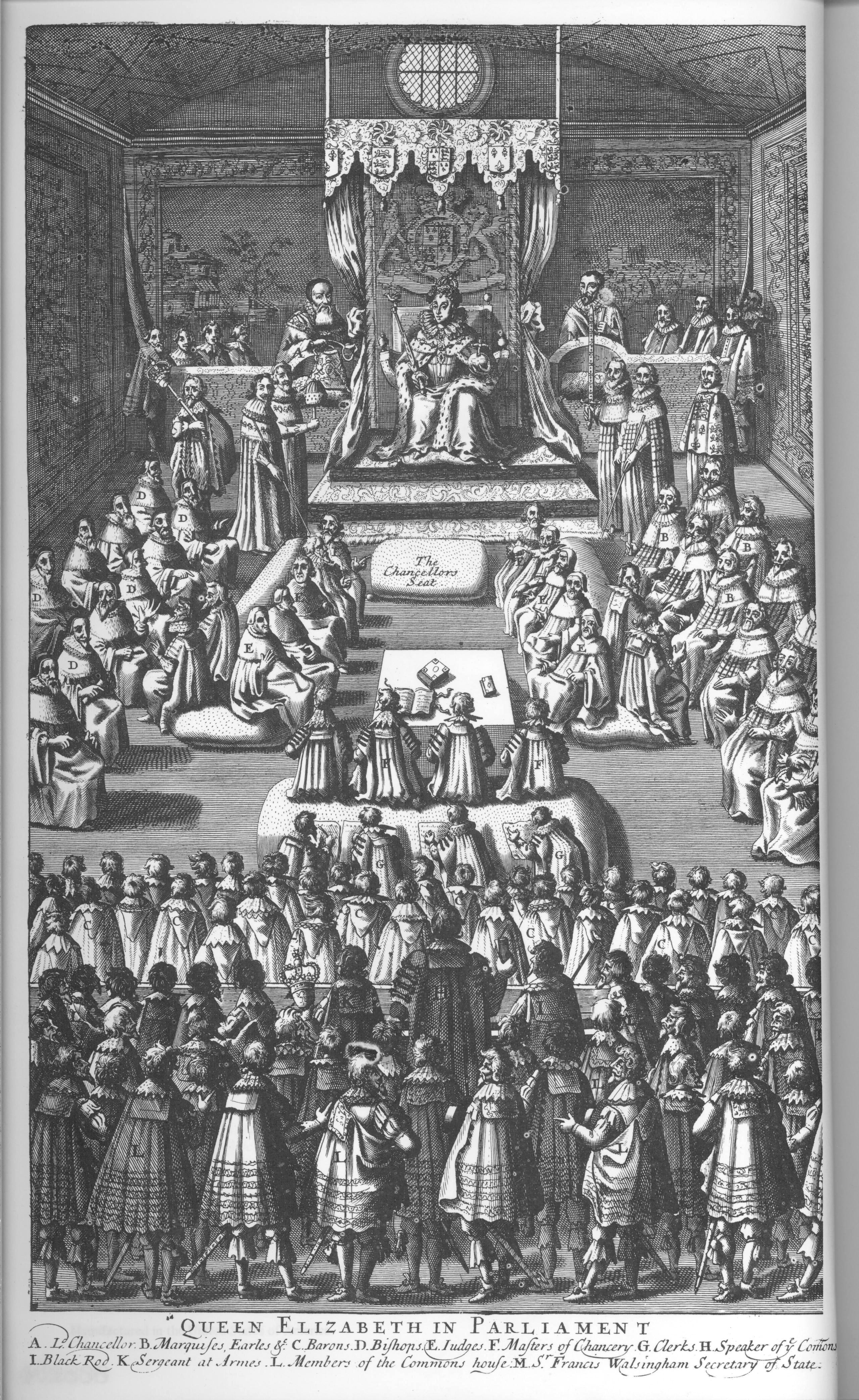
Queen Elizabeth I opening Parliament

When the Queen's first Parliament opened in January 1559, its chief goal was the difficult task of reaching a religious settlement. Twenty bishops (all Catholics) sat in the House of Lords as Lords Spiritual, and the Lords in general were opposed to change. In February, the House of Commons passed a Reformation Bill that would restore royal supremacy, the Edwardine Ordinal, and a slightly revised 1552 prayer book. It was not popular with the clergy, and the Convocation of Canterbury reacted by affirming papal supremacy, transubstantiation and the Mass as a sacrificial offering.

The lay peers joined the bishops in their opposition and succeeded in amending the bill considerably. The ordinal and prayer book provisions were removed and the Mass left unchanged, with the exception of allowing communion under both kinds. The pope's authority was removed, but rather than granting the Queen the title of supreme head of the church, it merely said she could adopt it herself. This bill would have returned the Church to its position at the death of Henry VIII rather than to that when Edward VI died. It was a defeat for the Queen's legislative programme, so she withheld royal assent.

=== Act of Supremacy ===
Following the Queen's failure to grant approval to the previous bill, Parliament reconvened in April 1559. At this point, the Privy Council introduced two new bills, one concerning royal supremacy and the other about a Protestant liturgy. The Council hoped that by separating them at least the Supremacy bill would pass. Under this bill, the Pope's jurisdiction in England was once again abolished, and Elizabeth was to be supreme governor of the Church of England instead of supreme head. All clergy and royal office-holders would be required to swear an Oath of Supremacy.

The alternative title was less offensive to Catholic members of Parliament, but this was unlikely to have been the only reason for the alteration. It was also a concession to the Queen's Protestant supporters who objected to "supreme head" on theological grounds and who had concerns about a female leading the Church. John Calvin, an influential Continental reformer, had called Henry VIII's claim to supreme headship blasphemy. Thomas Sampson, a Marian exile, believed that "All scripture seems to assign the title of head of the Church to Christ alone".

The bill included permission to receive communion in two kinds. It also repealed the medieval heresy laws that Mary I had revived. Catholics gained an important concession. Under the bill, only opinions contrary to Scripture, the General Councils of the early church, and any future Parliament could be treated as heresy by the Crown's ecclesiastical commissioners. While broad and ambiguous, this provision was meant to reassure Catholics that they would have some protection.

The bill easily passed the House of Commons. In the House of Lords, all the bishops voted against it, but they were joined by only one lay peer. The Act of Supremacy became law.

=== Act of Uniformity and prayer book ===
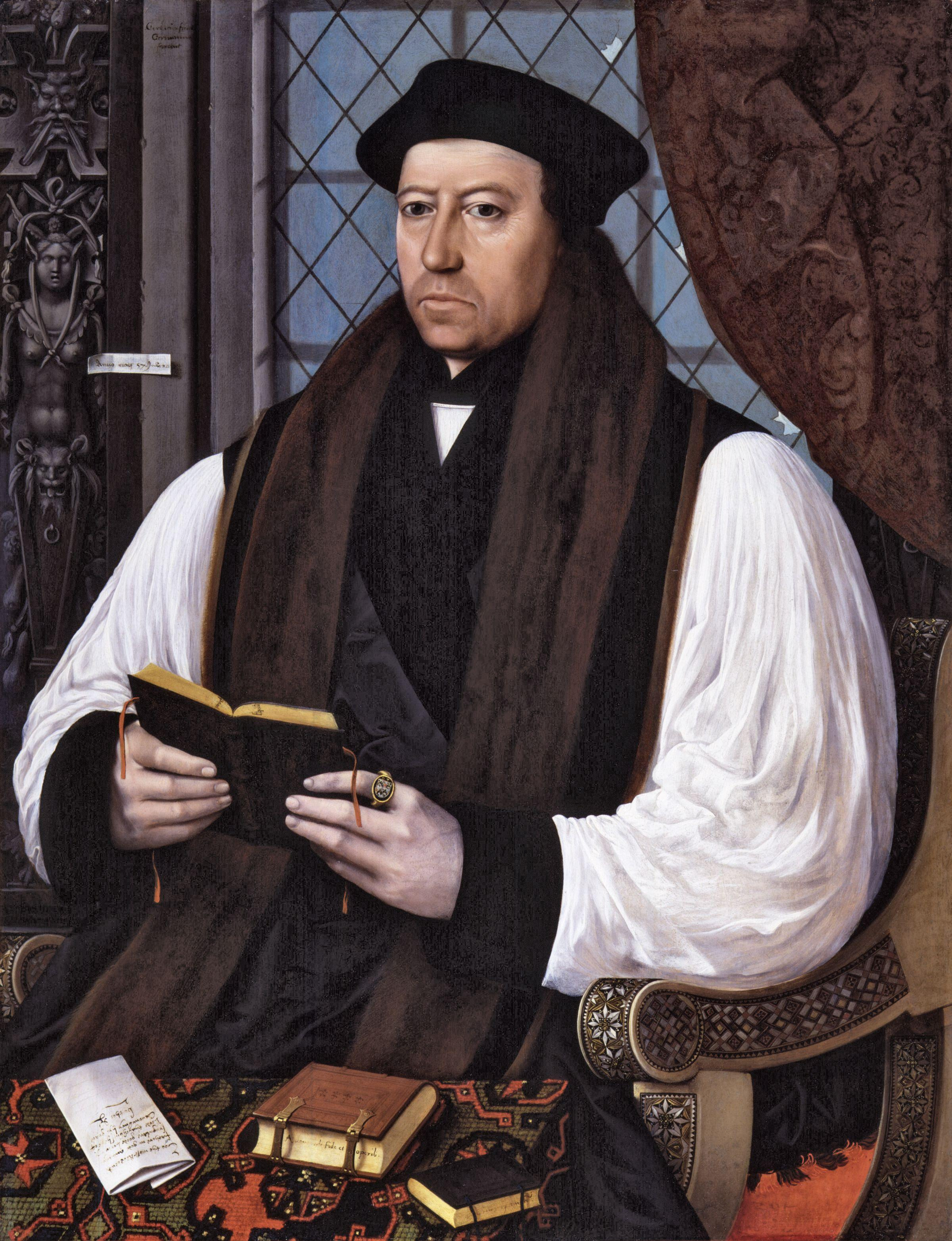
Thomas Cranmer (1489–1556), Edward VI's Archbishop of Canterbury and editor and co-author of both the 1549 and 1552 Books of Common Prayer

Another bill introduced to the same Parliament with the intent to return Protestant practices to legal dominance was the Uniformity bill, which sought to restore the 1552 prayer book as the official liturgy. It encountered more opposition in the Lords than the Supremacy Act, passing by only three votes. Even this was possible only through political intrigue. Bishops Watson of Lincoln and White of Winchester were imprisoned in the Tower. Bishop Goldwell of St Asaph was never summoned to Parliament, and the elderly Bishop Tunstall of Durham was excused from attending on account of age.

The Act of Uniformity required church attendance on Sundays and holy days and imposed fines for each day absent. It authorized the 1559 prayer book, which effectively restored the 1552 prayer book with some modifications. The Litany in the 1552 book had denounced "the bishop of Rome, and all his detestable enormities". The revised Book of Common Prayer removed this denunciation of the Pope. It also deleted the Black Rubric, which in the 1552 book explained that kneeling for communion did not imply Eucharistic adoration.

The Ornaments Rubric was added as one of the concessions to traditionalists in order to gain passage in the Lords. The rubric provided instructions for clerical vestments, stating that until the Queen ordered otherwise ministers were to "use such ornaments as were in use by the authority of Parliament in the second year of the reign of King Edward VI". Edward's second regnal year ran from 28 January 1548 to 27 January 1549. During this time, priests said Mass in Latin wearing traditional Catholic vestments. Few thought this was the rubric's meaning, however. Since the Act of Uniformity 1549 which approved the first prayer book was passed in January, it is likely that the provisions of the 1549 prayer book were intended, even though Edward's second year ended several months before the book was published. The 1549 prayer book required clergy to wear the alb, cope and chasuble. Opposition to the so-called "popish wardrobe" made it impossible to enforce the rubric.

The most significant revision was a change to the Communion Service that added the words for administering sacramental bread and wine from the 1549 prayer book to the words in the 1552 book. When communicants received the bread, they would hear the words, "The body of our Lord Jesus Christ, which was given for thee, preserve thy body and soul unto everlasting life [1549]. Take and eat this in remembrance that Christ died for thee, and feed on him in thy heart by faith with thanksgiving" [1552]. This combination could be interpreted as an affirmation of an objective real presence to those who believed in it, while others could interpret it to mean memorialism.

=== Scholarly interpretation ===
In his "Puritan Choir" thesis, historian J. E. Neale argues that Elizabeth wanted to pursue a conservative policy but was pushed in a radical direction by a Protestant faction in the House of Commons. This theory has been challenged by Christopher Haigh, who argues that Elizabeth wanted radical reform but was pushed in a conservative direction by the House of Lords. Haigh argues that the Act of Uniformity "produced an ambiguous Book of Common Prayer: a liturgical compromise which allowed priests to perform the Church of England communion with Catholic regalia, standing in the Catholic position, and using words capable of Catholic interpretation". This made it easier for priests to "counterfeit" the Mass without risking arrest.

Another historian, Diarmaid MacCulloch, also finds Neale's thesis flawed. At the same time, he calls the idea that the prayer book modifications were concessions to Catholics "absurd", writing that "these little verbal and visual adjustments" would never satisfy Catholic clergy and laity after the loss of "the Latin mass, monasteries, chantries, shrines, gilds and a compulsory celibate priesthood". He argues the modifications were most likely meant to appease domestic and foreign Lutheran Protestants who opposed the memorialist view originating from reformed Zurich. In 1559, Elizabeth was still unsure of the theological orientation of her Protestant subjects, and she did not want to offend the Lutheran rulers of northern Europe by veering too far into the Reformed camp. "It was worthwhile for Elizabeth's government to throw the Lutherans a few theological scraps, and the change also chimed with the Queen's personal inclination to Lutheran views on eucharistic presence."

Historians Patrick Collinson and Peter Lake argue that until 1630 the Church of England was shaped by a "Calvinist consensus". During this time, Calvinist clergy held the best bishoprics and deaneries. Historians John Coffey and Paul C. H. Lim write that the Elizabethan Church "was widely regarded as a Reformed church, but it was anomalous in retaining certain features of late medieval Catholicism", such as cathedrals, church choirs, a formal liturgy contained in the prayer book, traditional clerical vestments and episcopal polity.

== Implementation ==
=== Episcopal appointments ===
To enforce her religious policies, Queen Elizabeth needed bishops willing to cooperate. Seven bishops, including Cardinal Pole, Mary's Archbishop of Canterbury, died in 1558 and needed to be replaced. The remaining bishops were all Catholics appointed during Mary's reign, and Elizabeth's advisers hoped they could be persuaded to continue serving. Ultimately, all but two bishops (the undistinguished Anthony Kitchin of Llandaff and the absentee Thomas Stanley of Sodor and Man) lost their posts. Most of their replacements were not consecrated until December 1559 or early 1560.

Elizabeth chose Matthew Parker to replace Pole as Archbishop of Canterbury. Parker was a prominent scholar and had served as chaplain to Elizabeth's mother, Anne Boleyn. Also, like Elizabeth, Parker was a Nicodemite—someone who stayed in England during Mary's reign and outwardly conformed to Catholicism. Most of the other posts went to Marian exiles such as Edmund Grindal for London, Richard Cox for Ely, John Jewel for Salisbury, William Barlow for Chichester and John Scory for Hereford. Those exiles with ties to John Calvin's reformation in Geneva were notably excluded from consideration. The Queen never forgave John Knox for writing The First Blast of the Trumpet Against the Monstruous Regiment of Women, which denounced female monarchs, and the Reformation in Geneva was tainted by association.

=== Royal injunctions ===
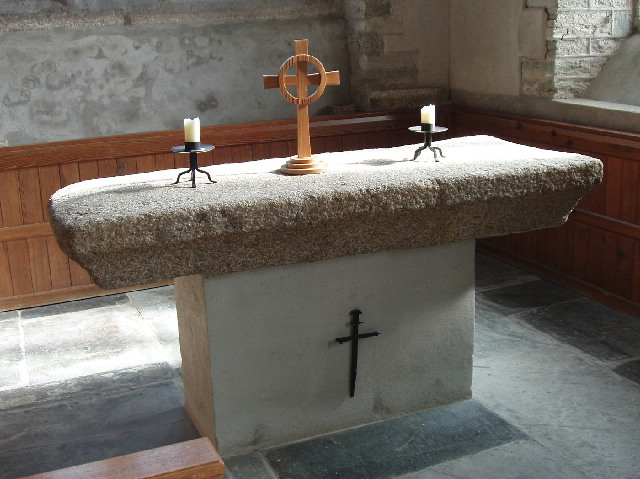
Ancient altar stone at Jacobstow Church. It was the main altar stone up to about 1550 in the reign of Edward VI when it was removed and used as a footbridge over a stream.

In the summer of 1559, the government conducted a royal visitation of the dioceses. The visitation was conducted according to injunctions based on the Royal Injunctions of 1547. These new royal injunctions were meant to fill in the details of the settlement and were to be enforced nationwide by six groups of clerical and lay commissioners. All of the leading clergymen were Protestants and former exiles (Robert Horne, Thomas Becon, Thomas Bentham, John Jewel, Edwin Sandys, and Richard Davies), and they interpreted the injunctions in the most Protestant way possible.

According to the injunctions, church images that were superstitiously abused were condemned as idolatry, but the commissioners mandated the destruction of all pictures and images. Across the nation, parishes paid to have roods, images and altar tabernacles removed, which they had only recently paid to restore under Queen Mary. They would spend more money on buying Bibles and prayer books and replacing chalices with communion cups (a chalice was designed for the priest alone whereas a communion cup was larger and to be used by the whole congregation).

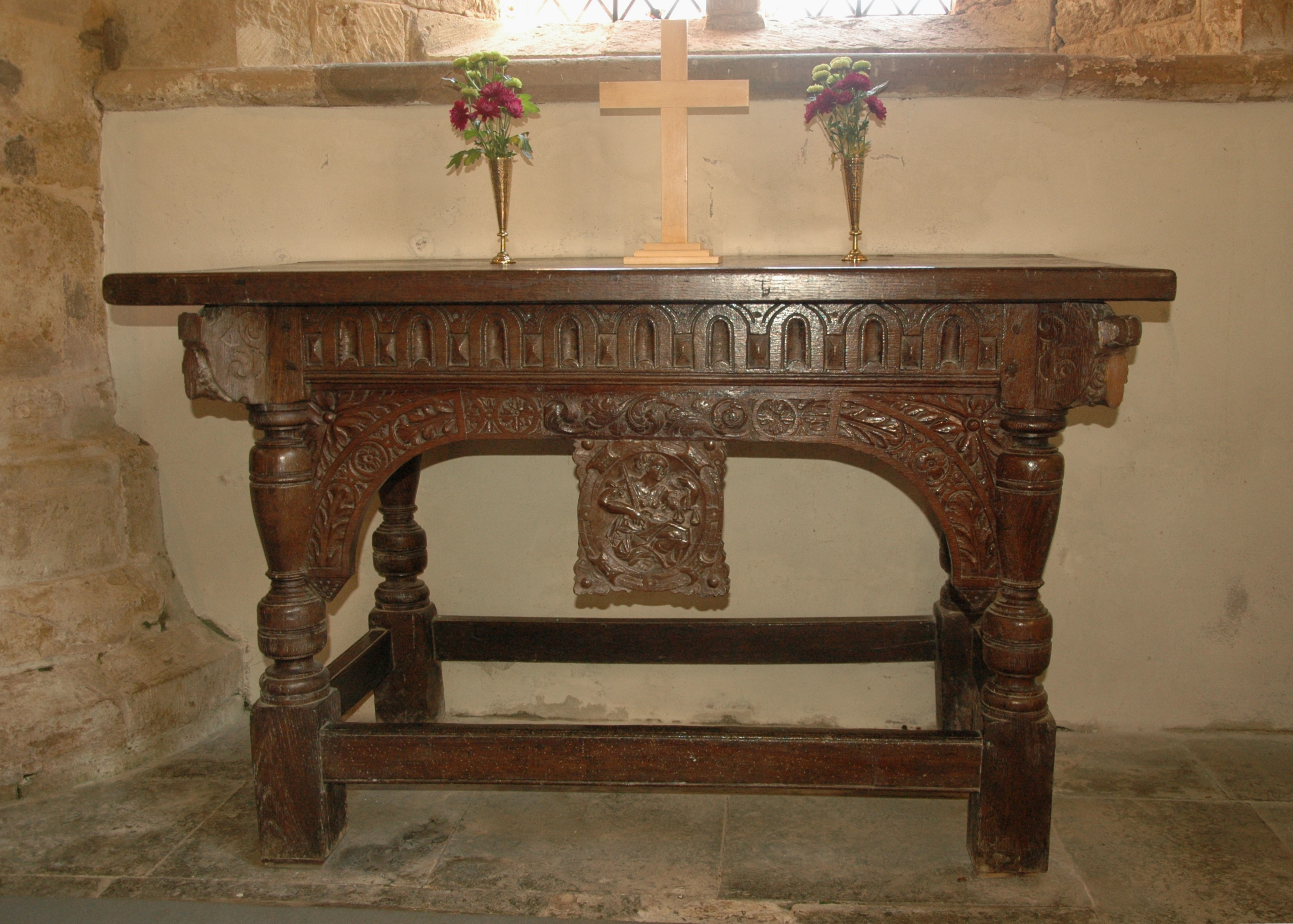
A 17th-century communion table in St Laurence Church, Shotteswell

The Injunctions offered clarity on the matter of vestments. Clergy were to wear the surplice (rather than cope or chasuble) for services. In 1560, the bishops specified that the cope should be worn when administering the Lord's Supper and the surplice at all other times. Other provisions of the Royal Injunctions were out of step with the Edwardian Reformation and displayed the Queen's conservative preferences. These included injunctions allowing processions to take place at Rogationtide and requirements that clergy receive permission to marry from the bishop and two justices of the peace.

In some instances, the injunctions contradicted the 1559 prayer book. While the prayer book directed the use of ordinary bread for communion, the Injunctions required traditional wafers to be used. There were also conflicting directions for the placement of the communion tables that were to replace stone altars. According to the prayer book, the table should be placed permanently in the chancel oriented east to west. The injunctions ordered the "holy table" to be carried into the chancel during communion services but at all other times to be placed where the altar would have stood. When not in use, it was to be oriented north to south, the same as an altar. These provisions offended many Protestants, and in practice, the Injunctions were often ignored by church leaders.

The Queen was disappointed by the extreme iconoclasm of the Protestants during the visitations. In October 1559, she ordered that a crucifix and candlesticks be placed on the communion table in the Chapel Royal. Later, she decided that roods should be restored in parish churches. Elizabeth's bishops protested both moves as revivals of idolatry, arguing that all images were forbidden by the Second Commandment. In the end, the Queen and the bishops reached an unspoken compromise. She kept her crucifix and candles and dropped her plans to restore roods. In 1560, Bishop Grindal was allowed to enforce the demolition of rood lofts in London. A year later, the Queen herself ordered the demolition of all lofts, but the rood beams were to remain on which the royal arms were to be displayed. The Queen still believed there should be a division between the chancel and the rest of the church.

Many parishes were slow to comply with the injunctions. Many did so out of sympathy with traditional Catholic religion, while others waited to see if this religious settlement was permanent before taking expensive action. Churchwardens' accounts indicate that half of all parishes kept Catholic vestments and Mass equipment for at least a decade. Gradually, however, parishes complied as bishops exerted pressure. Most of the parish clergy were Catholics. Through the mid-1560s, there were an estimated 800 clergy who resigned or were deprived for refusal to conform. Most parish clergy kept their posts, but it is not clear to what degree they conformed. The bishops thought that Catholicism was widespread among the old clergy, but priests were rarely removed because of a clergy shortage that began with an influenza epidemic in 1558.

=== Music ===
Music in the Church of England was limited to biblical texts and music sung during worship in the early church. Examples of permissible music included metrical psalms and liturgical texts such as the Te Deum. Although most people were able to sing, worship was dominated by choral liturgies, especially in the cathedrals. During this time, motets were replaced by anthems, and William Byrd's Great Service was composed for the royal chapel and cathedrals. Parish churches tended to have less music as Puritan influences argued against using of funds to pay for choristers. Churches employed singers for special occasions, which might be paid with money, wine, or ale and bread. The impressment of boys for service as singers in St. Paul's Cathedral and the royal chapel continued during this period.

Devotional singing at home was shared between family and friends. By far the most popular and reprinted metrical Psalter was Thomas Sternhold's Whole book of Psalms. Although it was not legally required, it was traditional for virtually all Protestant churches and was also used at home.

== Thirty-nine Articles and the Homilies ==
The Elizabethan settlement was further consolidated by the adoption of a moderately Protestant doctrinal statement called the Thirty-nine Articles of Religion. While affirming traditional Christian teaching as defined by the first four ecumenical councils, it tried to steer a middle way between Reformed and Lutheran doctrines while rejecting Anabaptist thinking. The Thirty-nine Articles were not intended as a complete statement of the Christian faith but of the position of the Church of England in relation to the Catholic Church and dissident Protestants. In 1571, Convocation finalised the Thirty-nine Articles. It was given statutory force by the Subscription Act, which required all new ministers to affirm their agreement with this confessional statement.

With the Queen's approval, Convocation also issued a second Book of Homilies with sermons on 20 topics. One, "Of the Worthy Receiving of the Sacrament", added more detail to the church's doctrine of the Eucharist, which was described as "spiritual food" and "a ghostly substance and not carnal" made real by faith. This receptionist view had much in common with John Calvin's Eucharistic theology. "Of Common Prayer and Sacraments" taught that although only baptism and the Eucharist were sacraments instituted by Christ other rites such as ordination had a sacramental character.

== Reception ==
The settlement of 1559 had given Protestants control of the Church of England, but matters were different at the parish level, where Catholic priests and traditional laity held large majorities. The bishops struggled for decades to impose the prayer book and Injunctions on reluctant parishes. "For a while, it was possible to sustain an attenuated Catholicism within the parish framework, by counterfeiting the mass, teaching the seven sacraments, preserving images of saints, reciting the rosary, observing feasts, fasts, and customs". Over time, however, this "survivalist Catholicism" was undermined by pressures to conform, giving way to an underground Catholicism completely separate from the Church of England.

Gradually, England was transformed into a Protestant country as the prayer book shaped Elizabethan religious life. By the 1580s, conformist Protestants (termed "parish anglicans" by Christopher Haigh and "Prayer Book protestants" by Judith Maltby) were becoming a majority. Efforts to introduce further religious reforms through Parliament or by means of Convocation were consistently blocked by the Queen. The Church of England's refusal to adopt the patterns of the Continental Reformed churches deepened conflict between Protestants who desired greater reforms and church authorities who prioritised conformity.

=== Catholic resistance ===
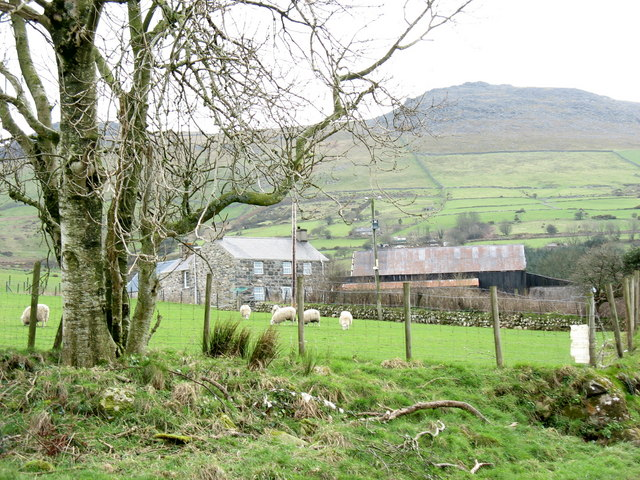
A recusant house in Wales that served as a Mass centre during the Reformation

In the early years of Elizabeth's reign, most Catholics hoped the Protestant ascendancy would be temporary, as it had been prior to Mary's restoration of papal authority. There were priests who conformed to the prayer book while also providing the Mass to their parishioners. Others refused to conform. Large numbers of deans, archdeacons, cathedral canons, and academics (mostly from Oxford but also from Cambridge) lost their positions. In the early years, some 300 Catholics fled, especially to the University of Louvain. From there they wrote and published a large body of Catholic polemical work to counter Protestantism, particularly Thomas Harding, Richard Smyth, and William Allen. They also acted as a "Church government in exile", providing Catholics in England with advice and instructions. In 1568, the English College at Douai was founded to provide a Catholic education to young Englishmen and, eventually, to train a new leadership for a restored Catholic Church in England. Other leading Marian churchmen remained in England to serve as private chaplains to Catholic nobles and gentry. Many became leaders of an underground Catholic Church.

Catholics were forced to choose between attending Protestant services to comply with the law or refusing to attend. Those who refused to attend Church of England services were called recusants. Most Catholics, however, were "church papists"—Catholics who outwardly conformed to the established church while maintaining their Catholic faith in secret. Wealthy church papists attended their parish church but had Mass at home or hired two chaplains, one to perform the prayer book service and the other to perform the Mass. Initially, recusant priests advised the laity to simply abstain from Protestant communion. However, this stance hardened over time. In 1562, the Council of Trent ruled out any outward conformity or Nicodemism for Catholics: "You may not be present at such prayers of heretics, or at their sermons, without heinous offence and the indignation of God, and it is far better to suffer most bitter cruelties than to give the least sign of consent to such wicked and abominable rites." By the late 1560s, recusancy was becoming more common.

In 1569, the Revolt of the Northern Earls attempted to overthrow England's Protestant regime. The rebellion was defeated, but it contributed to a perception that Catholicism was treason. This perception was seemingly confirmed when Elizabeth was excommunicated by Pope Pius V in February 1570. The papal bull Regnans in Excelsis released Elizabeth's Catholic subjects from any obligation to obey her. Subsequently, two Catholics, John Felton and John Story, were executed for treason. The discovery of the Ridolfi plot—a Catholic conspiracy to overthrow Elizabeth and place Mary, Queen of Scots on the throne—further alarmed the English government.

By 1574, Catholic recusants had organised an underground Catholic Church, distinct from the Church of England. However, it had two major weaknesses: membership loss as church papists conformed fully to the Church of England, and a shortage of priests. The latter problem was addressed by establishing seminaries to train and ordain English priests. In addition to the English College at Douai, a seminary was established at Rome, the Collegium Anglorum or English College, and two more were established in Spain at Valladolid and Seville. Between 1574 and 1603, 600 Catholic priests were sent to England. In 1580, the first Jesuit priests came to England.

The Queen's excommunication and the arrival of the seminary priests brought a change in government policy toward recusants. Before 1574, most laymen were not made to take the Oath of Supremacy and the 12d fine for missing a service was poorly enforced. Afterwards, efforts to identify recusants and force them to conform increased. In 1581, a new law made it treason to be absolved from schism and reconciled with Rome and the fine for recusancy was increased to £20 per month (50 times an artisan's wage). Afterwards, executions of Catholic priests became more common, and in 1585, it became treason for a Catholic priest to enter the country, as well as for anyone to aid or shelter him.

The persecution of 1581–1592 changed the nature of Catholicism in England. The seminary priests were hidden mainly among the Catholic gentry families of southern England. As the older generation of recusant priests died out, Catholicism collapsed among the lower classes in the north, west and in Wales. Without priests, these social classes drifted into the Church of England and Catholicism was forgotten. By Elizabeth's death, Catholicism had become "the faith of a small sect", largely confined to gentry households.

=== Puritanism ===
Leading Protestants within the Church of England were attracted to the Reformed churches of south Germany and Switzerland led by theologians such as John Calvin, Heinrich Bullinger and others. In England, however, Protestants were forced to operate within a church structure unchanged since medieval times with the same threefold orders of bishop, priest and deacon along with church courts that continued to use medieval canon law. In addition, the liturgy remained "more elaborate and more reminiscent of older liturgical forms" and "took no account of developments in Protestant thinking after the early 1550s". According to historian Diarmaid MacCulloch, the conflicts over the Elizabethan settlement stem from the "tension between Catholic structure and Protestant theology".

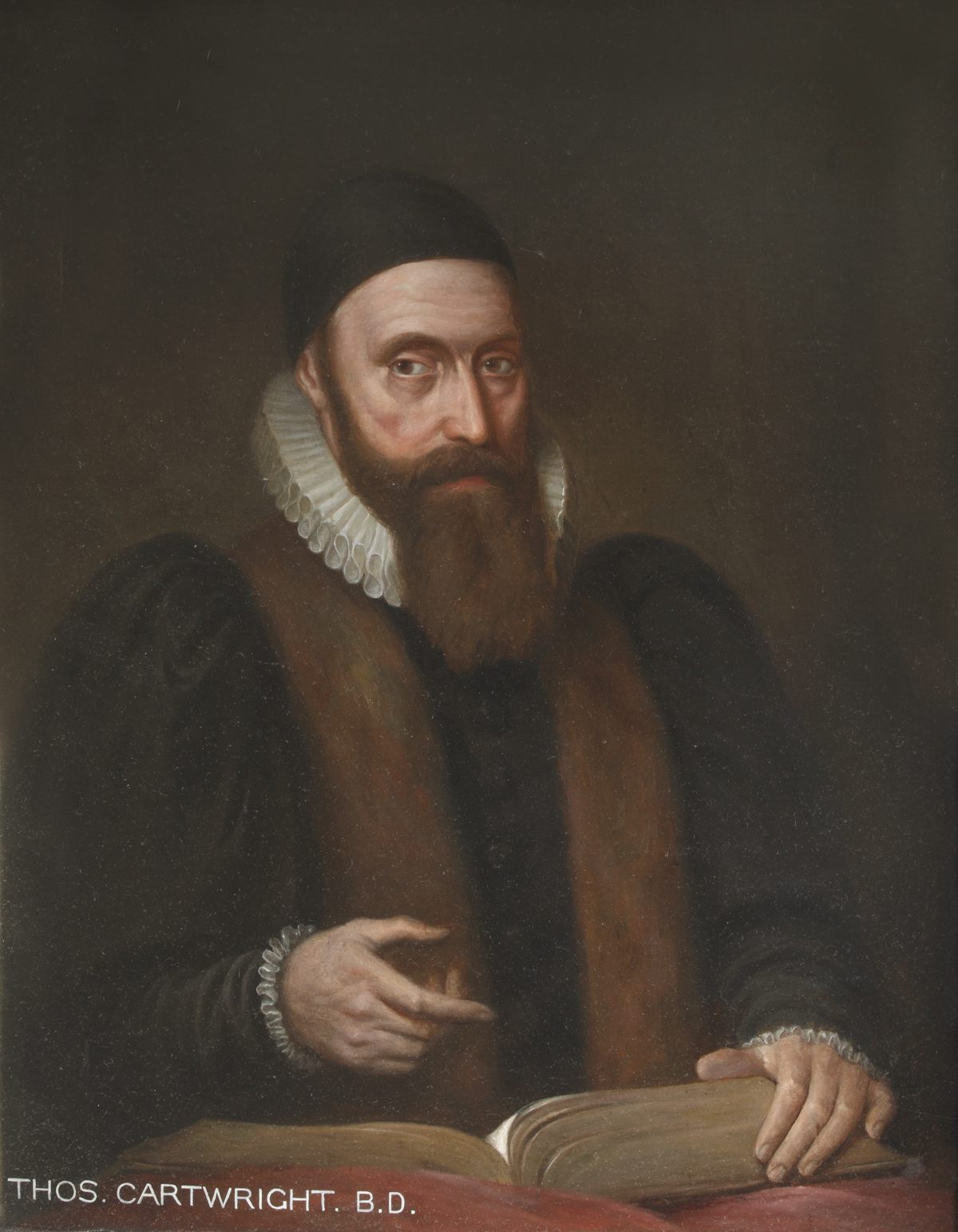
Thomas Cartwright was a leading Puritan and promoter of presbyterianism in the reign of Elizabeth I.

There were objections over the prayer book, including certain formulas and responses, the sign of the cross in baptism, the surplice and use of a wedding ring in marriage. Throughout her reign, the Queen successfully blocked attempts by Parliament and the bishops to introduce further change. The bishops were placed in the difficult position of enforcing conformity while supporting reform. This was particularly evident between 1565 and 1567 during the Vestments controversy over the refusal of some clergy to wear the clerical dress required by the Royal Injunctions. For many Protestants, clerical vestments symbolised a continued belief in a priestly order separate from the congregation, and could be interpreted by Catholics as affirmation of traditional doctrines. Bishop Jewel called the surplice a "vestige of error". In general, the bishops considered clerical dress adiaphora and tried to find compromise, but the Queen believed that the church—and herself as supreme governor—had authority to determine rites and ceremonies. In the end, Archbishop Parker issued a code of discipline for the clergy called the Advertisements, and the most popular and effective Protestant preachers were suspended for non-compliance.

The controversy over dress divided the Protestant community, and it was in these years that the term Puritan came into use to describe those who wanted further reformation. Some lost faith in the Church of England as an agent of reform, becoming separatists and establishing underground congregations. Most Puritans, however, remained in the Church of England. These Puritans were not without influence, enjoying the support of powerful men such as the Earl of Leicester, Walter Mildmay, Francis Walsingham, the Earl of Warwick and William Cecil.

In 1572, a bill was introduced in the Queen's 4th Parliament that would allow Protestants, with their bishop's permission, to omit ceremonies from the 1559 prayer book, and bishops would be further empowered to license clergymen to use the French and Dutch stranger church liturgies. Catholics, however, would have no such freedom. The Queen did not approve, disliking any attempt to undermine the concept of religious uniformity and her own religious settlement.

By 1572, the debate between Puritans and conformists had entered a new phase—church government had replaced vestments as the major issue. While Parliament still met, Thomas Wilcox and John Field published An Admonition to the Parliament that condemned "Popish abuses yet remaining in the English Church" and episcopal polity. It called for the church to be organised according to presbyterian polity. In November, A Second Admonition to Parliament was published—most likely authored by Thomas Cartwright or Christopher Goodman—which presented a more detailed proposal for church reform along presbyterian lines. John Whitgift of Cambridge University, a leading advocate for conformity, published a reply in October 1572, and he and Cartwright subsequently entered into a pamphlet war. The Admonition Controversy was not a disagreement over soteriology—both Cartwright and Whitgift believed in predestination and that human works played no role in salvation. Rather, the Admonition's authors believed that presbyterianism was the only biblical form of church government, whereas Whitgift argued that no single form of church government was commanded in the Bible. Under Field's leadership, the Classical Movement was active among Puritans within the Church of England throughout the 1570s and 1580s. Puritan clergy in this movement organised local presbyteries or classes, from which the movement took its name. Through the 1580s, Puritans were organised enough to conduct what were essentially covert national synods.

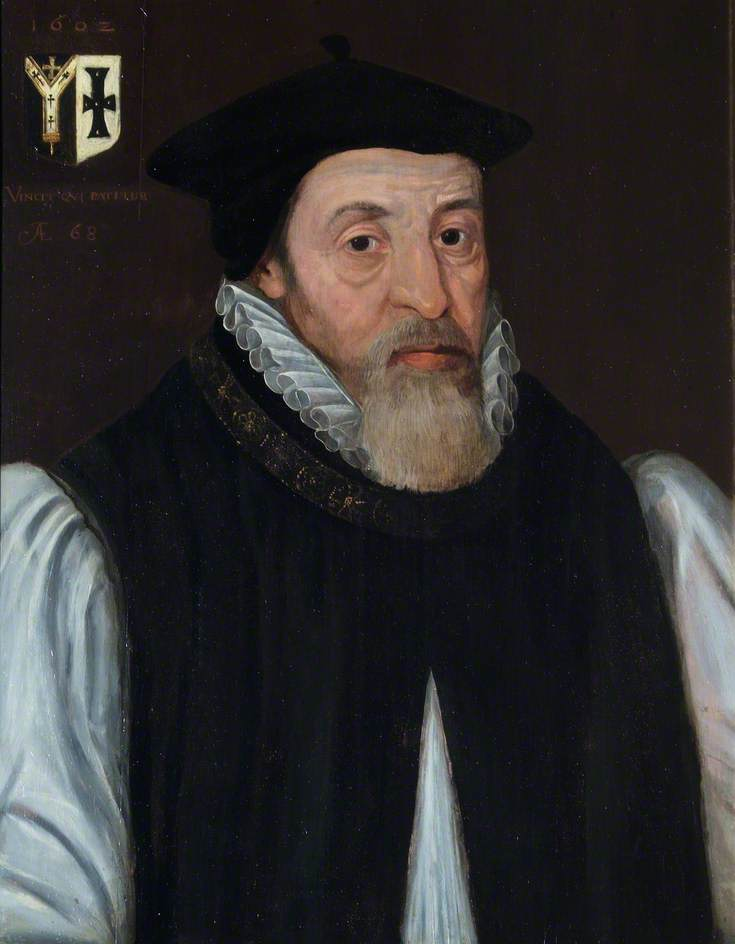
John Whitgift was Archbishop of Canterbury and a defender of the Elizabethan settlement.

In 1577, Whitgift was made Bishop of Worcester and six years later Archbishop of Canterbury. His rise to power has been identified with a "conservative reaction" against Puritanism. It is more accurate to call Whitgift and those like him conformists, since the word conservative carries connotations of Catholicism. The majority of conformists were part of the Reformed consensus that included the Puritans; what divided the parties were disputes over church government. Whitgift's first move against the Puritans was a requirement that all clergy subscribe to three articles, the second of which stated that the Prayer Book and Ordinal contained "nothing ... contrary to the word of God". Whitgift's demands produced widespread turmoil, and around 400 ministers were suspended for refusal to subscribe. Under pressure from the Privy Council, Whitgift was forced to accept conditional subscriptions from defiant ministers.

In the Parliaments of 1584 and 1586, the Puritans attempted to push through legislation that would institute a presbyterian form of government for the Church of England and replace the prayer book with the service book used in Geneva. Both attempts failed, mainly because of the Queen's opposition. In response, a group of conformists including Richard Bancroft, John Bridges, Matthew Sutcliffe, Thomas Bilson, and Hadrian Saravia began defending the English Church's episcopal polity more strongly, no longer merely accepting it as convenient but asserting it as divine law.

In response to Bridges' A Defence of the Government Established in the Church of England for Ecclesiastical Matters, an anonymous Puritan under the pseudonym Martin Marprelate published a series of tracts attacking leading conformist clergy. The 1588 Marprelate Controversy led to the discovery of the presbyterian organisation that had been built up over the years. Its leaders were arrested and the Classical Movement disintegrated. This debacle occurred at the same time that Puritanism's most powerful defenders at Court were dying off. In the aftermath of the conformist assault, the 1590s were relatively free of theological controversy. Once Whitgift had destroyed presbyterian activism, he was content to leave the Puritans alone. Likewise, Elizabethan Puritans abandoned the hopeless cause of presbyterianism to focus on less controversial pursuits.

== Legacy ==
In 1603, the King of Scotland inherited the English crown as James I. The Church of Scotland was even more strongly Reformed, having a presbyterian polity and John Knox's liturgy, the Book of Common Order. James was himself a moderate Calvinist, and the Puritans hoped the King would move the English Church in the Scottish direction. James, however, did the opposite, forcing the Scottish Church to accept bishops and the Five Articles of Perth, all attempts to make it as similar as possible to the English Church.

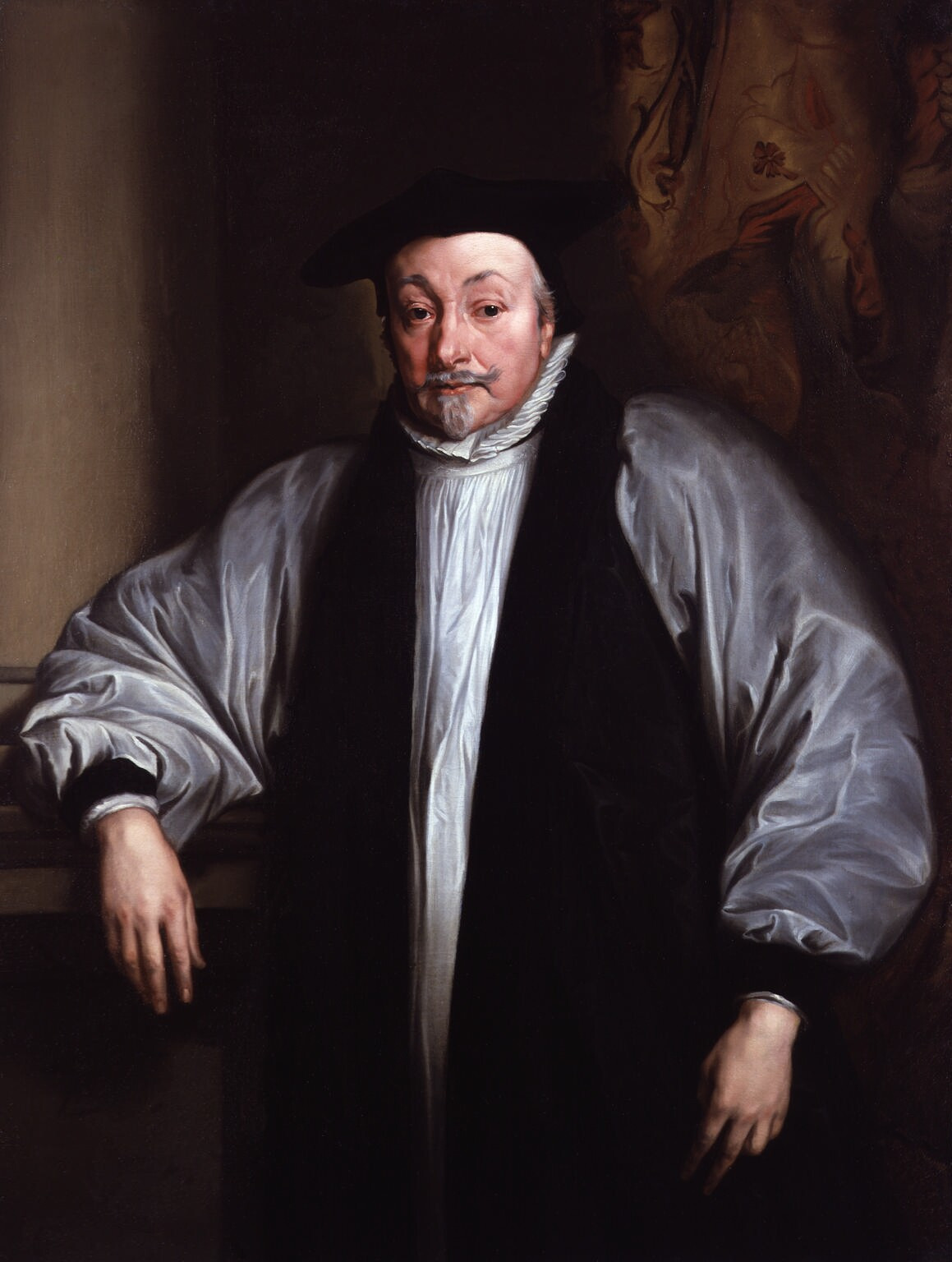
Archbishop William Laud's promotion of high church policies caused controversy within the Church of England.

At the start of his reign, Puritans presented the Millenary Petition to the King. This petition for church reform was referred to the Hampton Court Conference of 1604, which agreed to produce a new prayer book, the 1604 Book of Common Prayer, that incorporated a few changes requested by the Puritans. The most important outcome of the Conference, however, was the decision to produce a new translation of the Bible, the 1611 King James Version. While a disappointment for Puritans, the provisions were aimed at satisfying moderate Puritans and isolating them from their more radical counterparts.

The Church of England's dominant theology was still Calvinism, but a group of theologians associated with Bishop Lancelot Andrewes disagreed with many aspects of the Reformed tradition, especially its teaching on predestination. Like the Puritans, Andrewes engaged in his own brand of nonconformity. In his private chapel, he added ceremonies and formulas not authorised in the prayer book, such as burning incense. James I tried to balance the Puritan forces within his church with followers of Andrewes, promoting many of them at the end of his reign. This group was led by Richard Neile of Durham and became known as the Durham House group. They looked to the Church Fathers rather than the Reformers and preferred using the more traditional 1549 prayer book. Due to their belief in free will, this new faction is known as the Arminian party, but their high church orientation was more controversial.

During the reign of Charles I, the Arminians were ascendant and closely associated with William Laud, Archbishop of Canterbury (1633–1645). Laud and his followers believed the Reformation had gone too far and launched a "'Beauty of Holiness' counter-revolution, wishing to restore what they saw as lost majesty in worship and lost dignity for the sacerdotal priesthood." Laudianism, however, was unpopular with both Puritans and Prayer Book Protestants, who viewed the high church innovations as undermining forms of worship they had grown attached to. The English Civil War resulted in the overthrow of Charles I, and a Puritan dominated Parliament began to dismantle the Elizabethan settlement. Episcopacy was replaced with a semi-presbyterian system. In 1645, the prayer book was made illegal and replaced by the Directory for Public Worship. The Directory was not a liturgical book but only a set of directions and outlines for services.

The Restoration of the monarchy in 1660 allowed for the restoration of the Elizabethan settlement as well. The 1662 prayer book mandated by the 1662 Act of Uniformity was a slightly revised version of the previous book. Many Puritans, however, were unwilling to conform to it. Around 900 ministers refused to subscribe to the new prayer book and were removed from their positions, an event known as the Great Ejection. Puritans became dissenters. Now outside the established church, the different strands of the Puritan movement evolved into separate denominations: Congregationalists, Presbyterians, and Baptists.

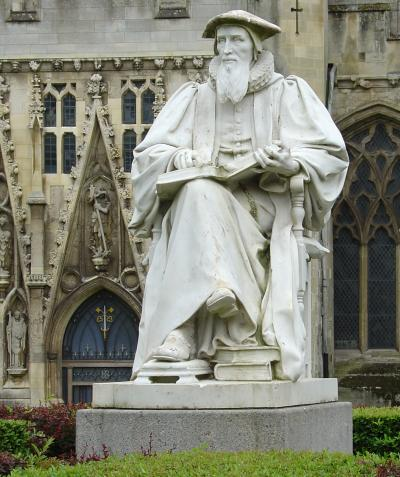
Statue of Richard Hooker in front of Exeter Cathedral

The Church of England was fundamentally changed. The "Jacobean consensus" was shattered, and the Church of England began defining itself less broadly. The suppression and marginalisation of Prayer Book Protestants during the 1640s and 1650s had made the prayer book "an undisputed identifier of an emerging Anglican self-consciousness." Historian Judith Maltby writes that Anglicanism as a recognisable tradition "owes more to the Restoration than the Reformation". It was in the period after 1660 that Richard Hooker's thought became influential within the Church of England, as Anglicans tried to define themselves in ways distinct from Protestant dissenters.

Diarmaid MacCulloch states that Hooker's writings helped to create an "Anglican synthesis". From Hooker, Anglicanism "inherited its belief in the place of reason as an authority for action, its esteem for continuity over the Reformation divide, and a hospitality towards sacramental modes of thought". From the Arminians, it gained a theology of episcopacy and an appreciation for liturgy. From the Puritans and Calvinists, it "inherited a contradictory impulse to assert the supremacy of scripture and preaching".

The clash between Calvinists and Arminians was never resolved, and the "seesaw battle between Catholic and Protestant within a single Anglican ecclesiastical structure has been proceeding ever since". The preface to the 1662 prayer book defined the Church of England as a via media "between the two extremes of too much stiffness in refusing and of too much easiness in admitting any variation". Historian A. G. Dickens wrote that while Elizabeth I "cannot be credited either with the invention of Anglo-Catholicism or with a prophetic latitudinarian policy which foresaw the rich diversity of Anglicanism. Her preferences of 1558–9 nevertheless make this diversity possible".

=== Law still in force ===
- Act of Supremacy 1558,
- Act of Supremacy (Ireland) 1560,
- Simony Act 1588.

== See also ==
- A View of Popish Abuses yet remaining in the English Church
- History of the Church of England
- Liturgical struggle
- Peace of Augsburg 1555
- Religion in the United Kingdom
- Westminster Conference 1559
