= John Burges =

English clergyman and physician (1563–1635)

John Burges (Burgess) (1563–1635) was an English clergyman and physician. He held nuanced reformist views on the vexed questions of the time, on clerical dress and church ceremonies. His preaching offended James I of England, early in his reign, and Burges went abroad for medical training. He spent many years building up a practice, and only resumed a relationship of conformity within the Church of England in the 1620s.

== Early years ==
John was born in Peterborough the son of John Burges (fl. 1561-89) and his wife Ales (d. 1588). After attending Peterborough Grammar School, he continued his education at St. John's College, Cambridge, and graduated at that university as B.A. in 1586.

== Early career ==
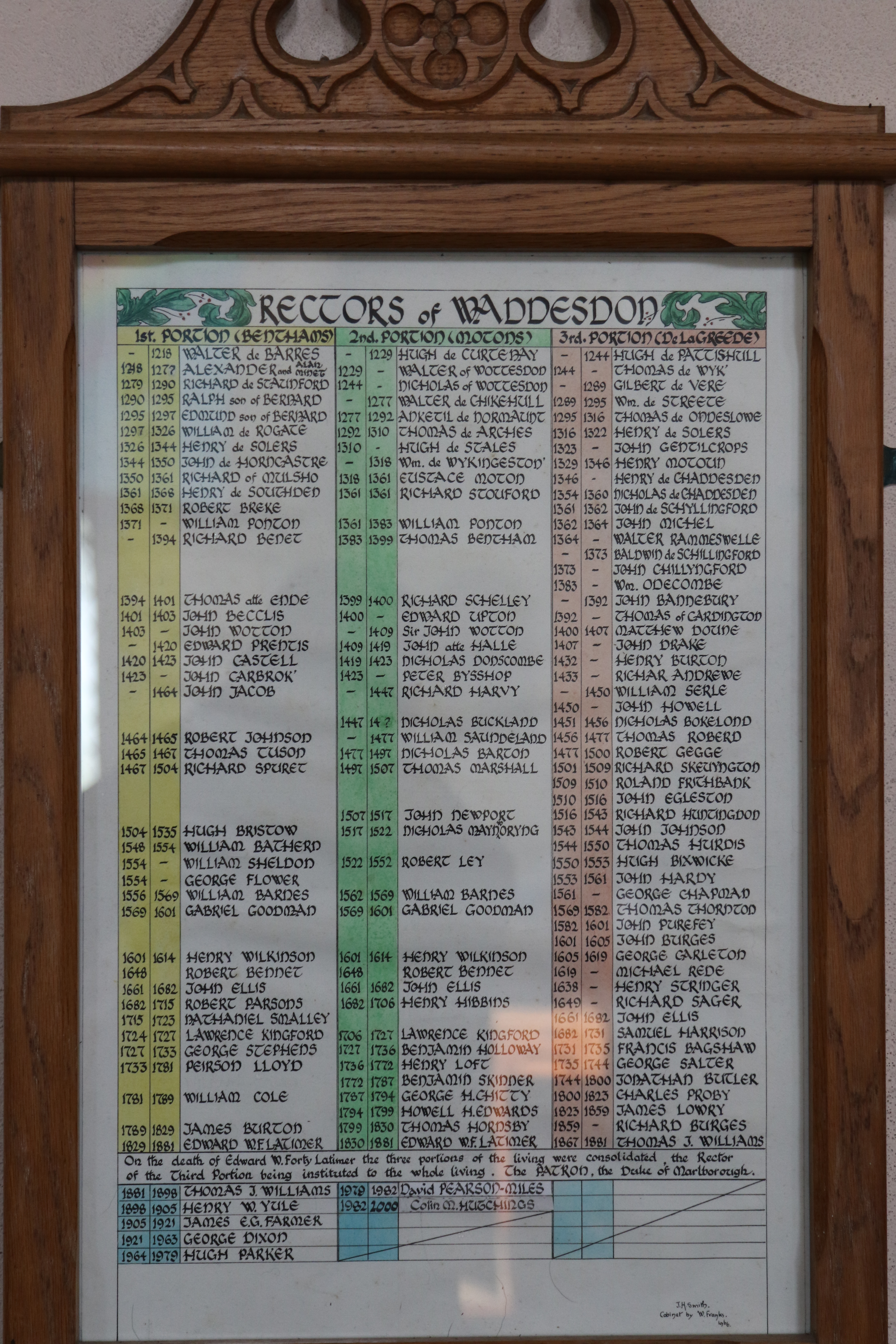
List of rectors, St Michael and All Angels' Church, Waddesdon

He was rector of the small living of St Peter Hungate, Norwich in 1589, when he married Ursula Pecke, the daughter of William Pecke, JP. In 1590, when proceedings were taken against Thomas Cartwright and his supporters, Burges identified with Cartwright's Puritan party. He accepted their position on the surplice and the cross in baptism: they were not unlawful, but they were inexpedient. He left himself in the hands of his congregation; if they would not be scandalised by his wearing the surplice and using the ceremonies, he would conform; if their consciences would be wounded by his submission, he would not. They answered that if he wore the surplice, they would not profit by his ministry, and accepting the verdict he resigned.

He was appointed Ipswich Town Preacher in 1592, an appointment for life which he relinquished after 1601 when he was appointed as rector to the third portion ( De la Grene) the parish of Waddesdon, Buckinghamshire. This was in the Diocese of Lincoln at that time. William Chadderton, was Bishop of Lincoln. Throughout the first year after James I's accession the nonconformist party gave the king no peace. On 16 July 1604 a proclamation was issued requiring all ministers to conform to the new book of ecclesiastical canons before the last day of November following. Burges was regarded as a leading man among the conscientiously disaffected. While the Convocation was deliberating on the canons, he was called upon to explain the ground he took and to preach before the king at Greenwich on 19 June 1604. Burges chose his text from Psalm cxxii. 8, 9. One particular passage seems to have provoked the king. Burges likened the ceremonies to Vedius Pollio's glasses, "which were not worth a man's life or livelihood," and for this and other expressions he was sent to the Tower of London.

He was not kept long in prison; on sending a written copy of his sermon with a letter of submission to the king and another to the lords of the privy council, he was released. He drew up his Apology, which was addressed to Bishop Chadderton, and sent to him in manuscript; another copy was presented to the king by a friend, Sir Thomas Jermyn of Rushbrooke, Suffolk. The pamphlet was circulated, and William Covell was ordered to prepare an answer. When the appointed day arrived, Burges refused to subscribe to the canons, resigned his living, and was silenced.

=== Exile the United Provinces and subsequent return ===
Burges left England and retired to Leyden, where for the next six or seven years he studied medicine and took the degree of doctor of physic.

Burges seems to have returned to England in 1612 or 1613; in June of the latter year James I wrote a letter to the university of Cambridge complaining that he had been allowed to take the degree of doctor of physic without subscription to the three articles of the 36th canon. The university, in consequence of the king's letter, passed a statute enacting that none should take the doctorate in any faculty without previously subscribing.

Burges had taken up his residence in London, and by a stretch of the royal prerogative he was prevented from practising physic in London on the ground that he had been in holy orders. He moved to Isleworth, and rapidly acquired a large and lucrative practice, his patients including Lucy Russell, Countess of Bedford. Theodore Mayerne, court physician, defended him, and in June 1616 Francis Bacon wrote to George Villiers suggesting that he should intercede for Burges with the king, saying that the doctor was then prepared to subscribe, and desired to resume his ministry.

Burges was elected to a preachership at Bishopsgate, and six months afterwards he was offered and he accepted the living of Sutton Coldfield in Warwickshire, which had been resigned by Edward Chetwynd on his promotion to the deanery of Bristol in July 1617. On 5 July of that month he preached at Paul's Cross, where the audience included Ralph Winwood. But at no point did he regain royal favour.

=== Later years ===
When Sir Horatio Vere went out to engage in the war of the Palatinate in 1620, Burges accompanied him as his chaplain; he does not seem to have remained long with the English force, and he was succeeded by his future son-in-law, William Ames. In January 1625 Bishop Thomas Morton collated him to a prebendal stall of Wellington in Lichfield Cathedral. At Sutton Coldfield he continued to reside till the end of his life, being, as Anthony à Wood writes, "held in much respect among the godly."

On 10 July 1627 Burges was one of fifty-nine Cambridge men who incorporated at Oxford, regarded then as a conformist to the church of England. Four years after this he published his last work. Burges died 31 August 1635, and was buried in the chancel of Sutton Coldfield church, where a monument exists to his memory. He perhaps never quite relinquished his medical practice, and as late as August 1634 he was admitted an extra licentiate of the College of Physicians.

The sermon he preached before James I, with accompanying correspondence was published several years after his death in 1642 by Thomas Brudenell: A sermon preached before the late King James His Majesty at Greenwich the 19 of Iuly 1604 together with two letters in way of apology for his sermon: the one to the late King Iames His Majesty: the other to the Lords of His Majesties then Privie Councell / by John Burges ..., London :: Printed by Thomas Brudenell, 1642.

== Family ==
Burges married Dorothy, daughter of Thomas Wilcox, whose works he edited in folio in 1624. By her he had at least three daughters, one of them married to William Ames.
