= A View of Popish Abuses Yet Remaining in the English Church =

1572 puritan tract

A View of Popish Abuses was written by John Field in 1572, criticising the church services, priests and clergy of Elizabethan England, particularly the Elizabethan Religious Settlement. A Puritan clergyman, Field desired to change the Act of Uniformity 1558 in order to remove aspects of Roman Catholicism that he found unacceptable. A View of Popish Abuses was designed to sway public opinion towards his view.

== Contents ==
Field's main complaints concerned the church services that took place. According to his publication:

- There was little or no discipline in services and parishioners frequently paid little attention, spoke amongst themselves, ate or slept during the liturgy.
- Congregations were required to kneel at the name of Jesus, which caused lots of noise that obscured the next sentence of the passage being read. This kneeling was not required at the name of God, which Field found blasphemous.
- The 'preaching' in the service was most frequently simply reading, and was carried out as fast as possible. Field accused priests of doing this in order to indulge in "games of Sodom" in the afternoon.
- Field, who believed education was vital, was mortified that the majority of congregations were ignorant of much of the Bible and thought the Gospels more important than the Old Testament.
- He attacked cathedrals, labeling them "popish dens".

== Publication and aftermath ==
Field's book was published abroad with Thomas Wilcox's Admonition to the Parliament. Both Wilcox and Field were sentenced to a year's imprisonment in the Tower of London for the publication and breaking the Act of Uniformity 1558. Field was undeterred and continued to push for greater emphasis on preaching and the removal of Roman Catholic tendencies in the Church of England. It is likely that he penned at least some of the Marprelate Tracts of 1588.
