= Anthony Gilby =

English clergyman

Anthony Gilby (c.1510–1585) was an English clergyman, known as a radical Puritan and translator of the Geneva Bible, the first English Bible available to the general public. He was born in Lincolnshire, and was educated at Christ's College, Cambridge, graduating in 1535.

== Early life ==
In Gilby's early life, he served as a preacher in Leicestershire under the rule of Edward VI. During this time, he was brought together with people who shared similar opinions to his on the corruptions of the era. This pushed him to publish A Commentarye upon the Prophet Mycha (1551) and A Commentarye upon the Prophet Malaky (c. 1553), freely expressing through these texts his feelings about the persecution of his religion.

He converted to Protestantism in his younger years, and this would prove to be of the utmost importance in the course of his life. Gilby graduated with a Bachelor and Master of Arts from Cambridge University in 1531-2 and 1535 respectively. Throughout his education he was well known for "his skill in the biblical languages of Latin, Greek and Hebrew," which proved to be obvious assets to him in the translation of the Geneva Bible. When Mary Tudor took the throne in 1553, life for the Protestants only became more turbulent. This led many to flee to religiously free states; including the Gilby Family in 1555.

He became a minister in Leicestershire and a Calvinist. His Answer to the Devilish Detection of Stephen Gardiner was published in 1547 (as by AG), by John Day.

== Family ==
Gilby was recorded to have married a woman named Elizabeth. They had two daughters and two sons; unfortunately one of the daughters did not survive, leaving him with Ruth, Goddred, and Nathaniel Gilby. Gilby's translation work was extremely prevalent, not only throughout the country but also within his family life. This is supported by the fact that both his sons were translators of two prominent texts during their time: A Brief and Learned Treatise, Containing a True Description of the Antichrist by Georg Sohn and An Epistle to his Brother Quintus by Marcus Tullius Cicero. Goddred Gilby the translator was the elder son; the younger, Nathaniel, of Christ's College and fellow of Emmanuel College, Cambridge, was tutor to Joseph Hall, whose mother was one of Gilby's congregation.

== Marian Exile ==
When the Roman Catholic religion began to be restored in England, many Protestants were forced to leave the country. Protestants left not only for their physical safety and right to practise their own forms of worship, but, also because it gave them a chance to keep, define, and conserve their national religion for their eventual return to England. European-Protestant artisans were given more courtesy than the colonies of foreign Protestant artisans. European Protestants were given notice to leave and warned of arrest, while foreign Protestants were ordered to dismiss quickly. They originally fled to the Protestant cities of Strasbourg and Frankfurt, but later colonies were established at Emden, Zurich, Wesel, Worms, and Duisburg. In those colonies, particularly Frankfurt, many wanted to preserve the Edwardian English church, while radical others wanted a more demanding reformation. These differing opinions caused many arguments that resulted in the splitting of Frankfurt. Each colony had its own distinct nature, but there was significant contact between the groups of religious exiles. However, there was often lack of communication and unity on their most important issues.

The Marian Exiles wanted to encourage their coreligionists back home, so they produced many works on Protestant doctrine using the continental press, and urging them to flight, martyrdom, or rebellion. However, not all of the Marian Exiles left their countries for religious reasons: a large number of them left after failed attempts of secular concerns. After war broke out in 1557, many of these secular exiles put loyalty before religion and returned home to serve their country in whatever ways they could. When Queen Mary died in 1558, the period of Marian exile ended, and the exiles returned home to mixed receptions. Many men, including Anthony Gilby, spent years living in communities they felt were more thoroughly reformed than England.

Anthony Gilby was a part of this Marian exile, in Basel, in Frankfurt where he associated with John Foxe and lodged him in 1554, and settled in Geneva in 1555. There he deputed for John Knox, with Christopher Goodman. He also wrote An Admonition to England and Scotland (1558), contesting the royal supremacy in the Church of England as imposed by Henry VIII. His work on the Geneva Bible, which was published in 1560, was as one of the main assistants to William Whittingham.

== The Geneva Bible ==
After the Marian persecutions began, English Protestants went to Geneva. It was here that translators, including Gilby, worked on what would come to be known as the Geneva Bible. Later, after Mary's death, many of the exiles returned to England in 1558, but Gilby stayed in Geneva to complete the Geneva Bible, along with William Whittingham. Whittingham was the inspiration for this resourceful, yet prodigious task of translating the Bible because it was an extension of his New Testament of 1557. Gilby played an important role in Whittingham's idea for the Bible. Whittingham himself gave witness to Gilby's role in the translation of the Geneva Bible and recorded it in a piece entitled Livre des Anglais. The Geneva Bible contained easy-to-read maps, indexes, and notes for the interested reader. This nature of writing style dated back to the writing of William Tyndale, who also produced an English translation of the New Testament. The translators, including Anthony Gilby, created a piece of literature that was able to influence readers of all types during the sixteenth century, including William Shakespeare and John Milton. Many years later, the Geneva Bible was exchanged for the King James Version of 1611, which was more acceptable to the King.

Once the Geneva Bible was finished, Gilby finally returned to England in May 1560 and his masterpiece was published only a few weeks later. Gilby is accredited with supervising the translation and writing the annotations. However, his weakness was textual criticism, since he relinquished this part of the process to the other translators - Thomas Sampson, Thomas Bentham, William Cole, and Whittingham. The key attributes of the Geneva Bible were its print-type and size, the separation into quartos and octavos, the sectioning into verses, and the use of italics to signify the addition of words. But to Gilby's acclaim, the most meaningful of all the characteristics were the annotations. These explanatory notes presented a political view of the history of England. Gilby's first attempt as a translator had occurred in 1551, when he wrote a commentary on Micah. This text and the preface, both the work of Gilby, are highly significant because they corresponded to the techniques used by the translators in translating the Geneva Bible.

== Under Elizabeth ==
After Mary Tudor's death, Gilby and other Protestant writers wrote a letter to specific English Church congregations in Aarau and Frankfurt, attempting to persuade them to support the restoration of Protestantism.

On his return to England when Elizabeth I ascended the throne, he became involved in the vestments controversy, and remained a dissident and polemicist. Though not very close to the Presbyterians of the Church of England, he supported John Field and Thomas Wilcox in their First Admonition to Parliament (1572), which was an advocacy of Presbyterianism.

He found a powerful protector in Henry Hastings, 3rd Earl of Huntingdon, and was able to live out his life as a lecturer at Ashby-de-la-Zouch. By assiduous networking, and the influence he had over education at the Ashby grammar school, Gilby became a Puritan leader. Huntingdon assured the continuation of the local evangelical tradition, after Gilby's death, by appointing Arthur Hildersham as rector at Ashby in 1587.

== Works ==
Anthony Gilby's writing experience can be placed into three categories, including letters and treaties, the translation of the Geneva Bible and other minor commentaries, and his theological interests before and during the exile.

In November 1555, Anthony Gilby and Christopher Goodman, also a Marian Exile, both became clergymen of the Word of God for the English citizens of Geneva. After taking this oath, Anthony Gilby's accomplishments were mostly clerical, such as a letter written in 1558 to the English church encouraging uniformity to God after the news of Elizabeth's succession to the throne of England.

Before and during his exile, Gilby proceeded with the reform of religion throughout the Protestant Reformation. His religious interests, for instance, became one of his prominent efforts. His doctrine of predestination, in which he discussed the supremacy of God, is represented in the Geneva Bible's explanatory notes. He also wrote a preface to The Appellation from the Sentence Pronounced by the Bishops and Clergy by John Knox called An Admonition to England and Scotland, to call them to Repentance, in 1558.

Some of his additional works include:

- Commentaries of the divine, John Calvin, upon the Prophet Daniel (1570)
- The psalms of David truly opened and explained by Theodore Beza (1580)
- A Pleasant Dialogue betweene a Souldior of Barwicke and an English Chaplaine

== Notes ==
Attribution

This article incorporates text from a publication now in the public domain: Stephen, Leslie, ed. (1890). "Gilby, Anthony". Dictionary of National Biography. Vol. 21. London: Smith, Elder & Co.
