= Goddred Gylby =

English translator

Goddred Gylby (fl. 1561), was an English translator. A son of Anthony Gilby, he translated Cicero's Epistle to Quintus, London, 1561, and John Calvin's Admonition against Judicial Astrology (no date).
