= J. E. Neale =

Historian and biographer (1890–1975)

Sir J. E. Neale FBA
- Born: John Ernest Neale; 7 December 1890; Liverpool, England
- Died: 2 September 1975 (aged 84)
- Occupations: Historian and academic
- Known for: Puritan choir theory
- Board member of: London Museum
- Spouse: Elfreda Skelton
- Children: 1

Academic background
- Education: University of Liverpool; University College London
- Doctoral advisor: A. F. Pollard

Academic work
- Discipline: History
- Sub-discipline: Early modern Britain; Political history; Elizabethan era; History of parliamentarism
- Institutions: University of Manchester; University College London
- Doctoral students: Patrick Collinson; Geoffrey Elton

Sir John Ernest Neale FBA (7 December 1890 – 2 September 1975) was an English historian who specialised in Elizabethan and Parliamentary history. From 1927 to 1956, he was the Astor Professor of English History at University College London.

== Academic career ==
Neale was trained by the political historian A. F. Pollard. His first professional appointment was the chair of Modern History at the University of Manchester, and he was then to succeed F. C. Montague as Astor Professor of English History at University College London in 1927. He was to hold this post until 1956. In 1955, Neale was knighted, and on 17 November 1958 he delivered a lecture in Washington, D.C. commemorating Elizabeth I's accession to the English throne four hundred years previously. From 1956, Neale was Professor Emeritus, but continued to do some academic teaching at University College London.

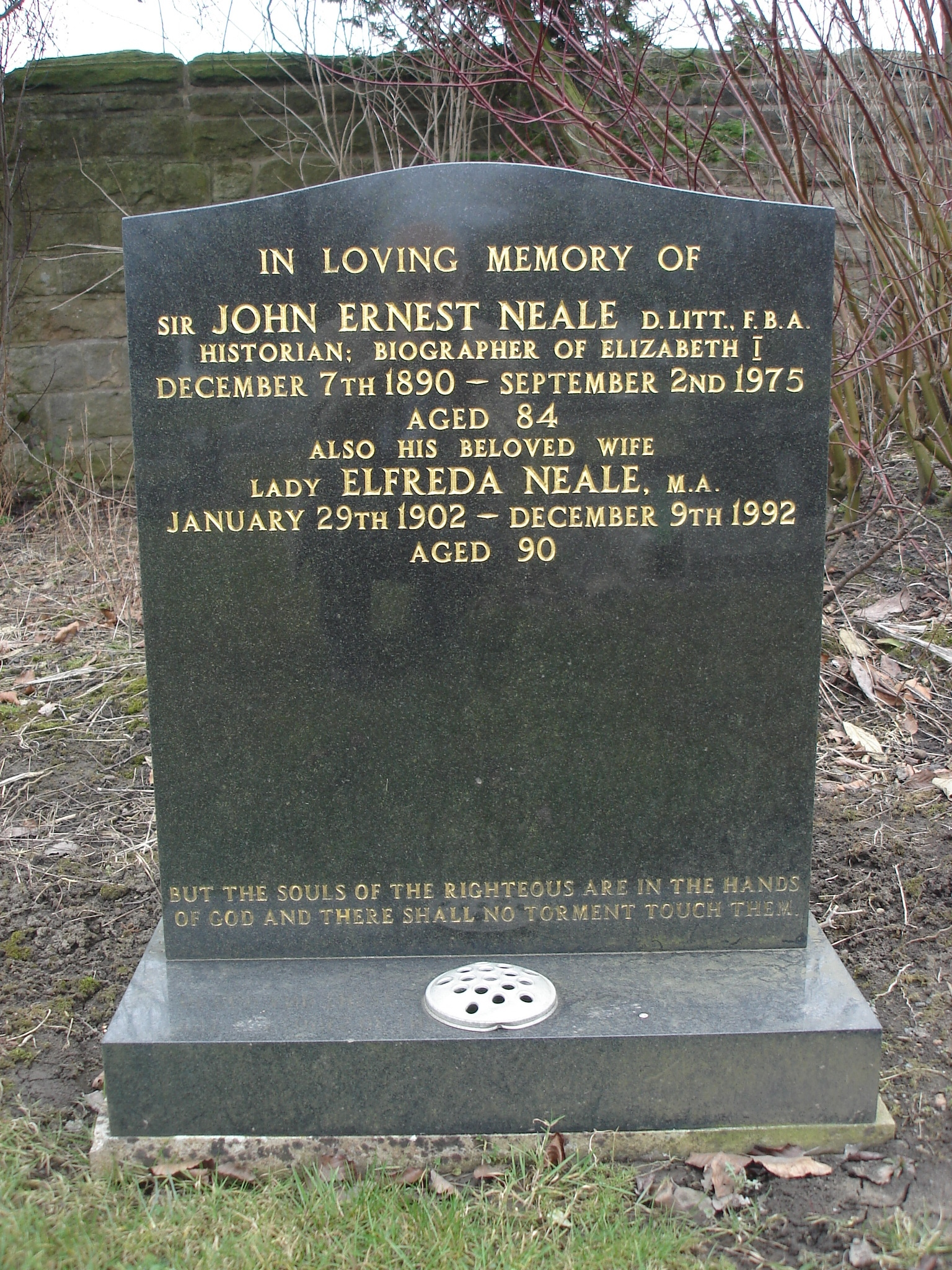
Sir John Neale's grave, Harrogate Cemetery

He died in 1975 and was buried in Harrogate Cemetery. He had married Elfreda Skelton of Harrogate, with whom he had a daughter, Stella.

== Historical views ==
Neale was the leading Elizabethan historian of his generation. In the opinion of fellow historian, and Neale's own graduate student, Patrick Collinson, Neale's biography of Elizabeth I "has yet to be bettered".

His painstaking research uncovered the political power of the gentry in The Elizabethan House of Commons (1949), whilst his 1948 Raleigh Lecture on ‘The Elizabethan political scene’ greatly expanded our knowledge of the politics of the reign. The two volumes on Elizabeth I and her Parliaments (1953 and 1957) explored the relationship between the Queen and her Parliaments. These were criticised by Sir Geoffrey Elton who claimed that the main preoccupation of these parliaments was the forming of Bills and the passing of Acts, not conflict between Crown and Parliament. Neale's claims that these parliaments were a landmark in the evolution of Parliament was criticised by medievalists such as J. S. Roskell. However Collinson notes that the conflicts which Neale wrote about did take place and that Neale's retelling of them made an exciting and unforgettable chapter in English history.

Neale is well known for his thesis on the Puritan Choir, in which he claimed that a group of Puritan MPs successfully managed to force Elizabeth's hand on many policy issues throughout her reign, including at the start. Neale is also recognised for his work in bringing to light new sources on Tudor England, and developing different ways of studying the period.

== Other positions held ==
- Trustee of the London Museum
- Member of the Editorial Board of the History of Parliament
- Fellow of the British Academy
- Honorary Member of the American Academy of Arts and Sciences

== Works ==
- Queen Elizabeth (Jonathan Cape, 1934)
- The Age of Catherine de Medici (Jonathan Cape, 1943)
- The Elizabethan Political Scene (British Academy, 1948)
- The Elizabethan House of Commons (Jonathan Cape, 1949)
- Elizabeth I and her Parliaments, 1559-1581 (Jonathan Cape, 1953) vol. 1
- Elizabeth I and her Parliaments, 1584-1601 (Jonathan Cape, 1957) vol. 2
- Essays in Elizabethan History (Jonathan Cape, 1958)

== See also ==
- Puritan choir
- Elizabethan Religious Settlement
