= Belle Patrick =

Scottish lawyer (1895–1972)

- Born: 22 August 1895; Anstruther, Scotland, British Empire
- Died: 1972 (aged 76–77)
- Children: Patrick

Belle Hay Patrick (22 August 1895 – 1972) was one of the first three women to become a lawyer in Scotland. However, despite qualifying in 1925, she never practiced as a lawyer, but rather focused her attention on missionary work in Algiers.

Patrick was born in Anstruther. She gained a scholarship to attend the local Waid Academy from the age of 9, and then a bursary to attend the University of St Andrews. However, at the insistence of her mother she found work with the legal firm of Mackintosh and Watson in the neighbouring village of Pittenweem.

== Missionary work ==
In 1924, before qualifying as a lawyer, Patrick met Lilias Trotter in St Andrews. She remained in Scotland until her qualification as a lawyer was confirmed. The following day, she booked her passage to Algiers where Trotter had become bedridden.
