= History of the Puritans under Elizabeth I =

Earliest Puritan history, 1558–1603

The reign of Elizabeth I of England, from 1558 to 1603, saw the start of the Puritan movement in England, its clash with the authorities of the Church of England, and its temporarily effective suppression as a political movement in the 1590s by judicial means. This led to the further alienation of Anglicans and Puritans from one another in the 17th century during the reigns of King James and King Charles I, that eventually brought about the English Civil War, the brief rule of the Puritan Lord Protector of England Oliver Cromwell, the English Commonwealth, and as a result the political, religious, and civil liberty that is celebrated today in all English speaking countries.

The English Puritan movement in the reign of Elizabeth and beyond sought to further the work of reforming the Church of England, eradicate the influence of Roman Catholicism in the land, as well as promote the national interest of the English crown and the English people under a united Protestant confession that was in strict conformity to the Bible and Reformed theology. This Puritan vision that began in the Elizabethan era would eventually result in the Westminster Assembly and the Westminster Standards, including Westminster Confession of Faith, the Shorter Catechism, and Larger Catechism, and the Directory for Public Worship.

== Background, to 1559 ==
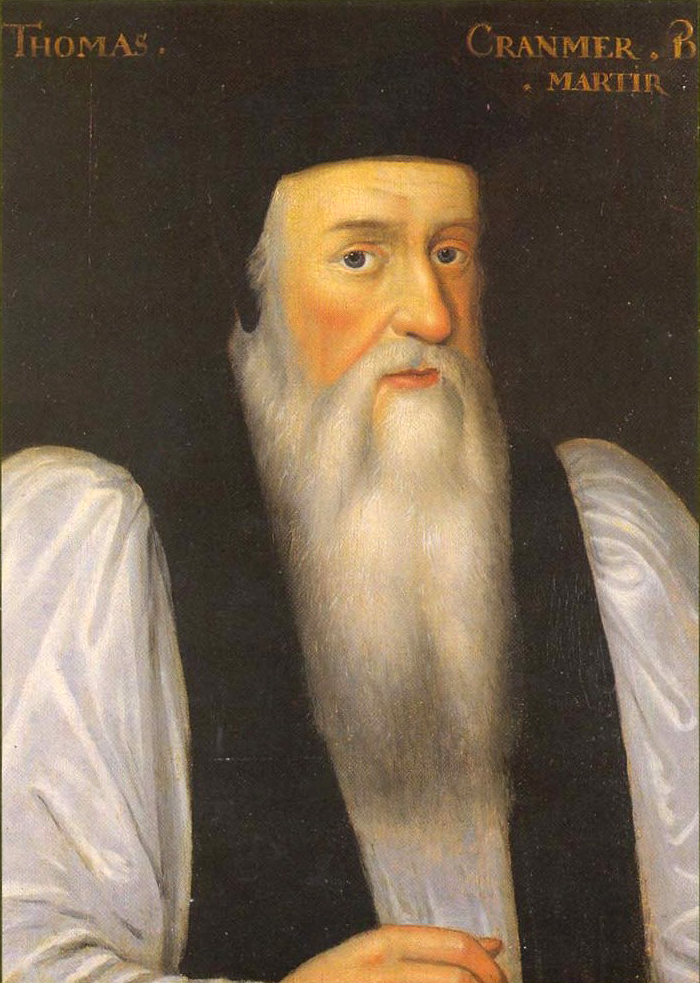
Thomas Cranmer, Archbishop of Canterbury, who became increasingly Calvinist throughout the 1540s.

The English Reformation began in the 1530s when Henry VIII separated the Church of England from the Roman Catholic Church and the authority of the pope. During Henry's reign, Protestants remained a minority of the English population, and Henry alternated between favoring his Protestant advisers and his traditional ones who wanted to maintain Catholic belief and practices.

Protestants were also divided among themselves. By the 1540s, Lutherans and the Swiss Reformed churches were opposed to each other on issues such as predestination and the use of religious images. The Reformed believed that statues, stained glass and pictures in church were idolatrous. They also disliked the use of traditional clerical vestments, preferring their ministers to wear black gowns. The Reformed replaced the elaborate liturgy of the medieval church with simple services of prayer and preaching. Unlike the Reformed, the Lutherans believed in the objective, real presence of Christ in the Lord's Supper, and they were not opposed to religious imagery and vestments. Many English Protestants were convinced that the Reformed churches were more faithful to biblical Christianity.

In the reign of Henry's son, Edward VI, the English Reformation took on a Reformed (or Calvinist) tone. By 1548, leading English Protestants including Thomas Cranmer, Archbishop of Canterbury, had adopted Reformed views on the Lord's Supper. Protestant theology was incorporated into a liturgy contained within the 1549 Book of Common Prayer and even more explicitly in a 1552 revision. Religious processions were banned and clerical marriage was allowed. Prayer for the dead, requiem masses, and the chantry foundations that supported them were abolished. Statues, stained glass windows, and wall paintings in parish churches were destroyed. Roods were replaced with the royal arms of England.

In 1553, Edward VI died, and his Catholic half-sister assumed the throne as Mary I of England. Mary sought to end the English Reformation and restore the Church of England to full communion with the Church of Rome. Around a thousand English Protestants, known as the Marian exiles, left the country for religious reasons. Unwelcome in German Lutheran territories, the exiles established English Protestant congregations in Rhineland towns such as Wesel, Frankfurt and Strasbourg, and the Swiss cities of Zurich, Basel, and Geneva. During the exile, English Protestants were exposed to ideas and practices of thoroughly Calvinist churches, as in Calvin's Geneva, and many would seek to implement those ideas in England after Mary's death.

== Elizabethan religious settlement, 1559 ==
In 1558, Queen Mary died, and her half-sister, Elizabeth became Queen of England. Elizabeth had been raised as a Protestant in the household of Catherine Parr. During the first year of Elizabeth's reign many of the Marian exiles returned to England. A compromise religious position was established in 1559. It attempted to make England Protestant without totally alienating the portion of the population that had supported Catholicism under Mary. The religious settlement was consolidated in 1563. An interim position of 11 articles of faith operated for a few years.

The Church of England under Elizabeth was broadly Reformed in nature: Elizabeth's first Archbishop of Canterbury, Matthew Parker, had been the executor of Martin Bucer's will, and his replacement Edmund Grindal had carried the coffin at Bucer's funeral. While the Elizabethan settlement proved generally acceptable, there remained minorities who were dissatisfied with the state of the Church of England. The cry for "further reform" in the 1560s was the basis of what is now known as the Puritan Movement.

The Puritans were not content with the Anglican settlement and the established church. They believed that the English church and state should be further reformed by the Word of God and the faithful preaching of the Gospel, as in the continental reformed churches. They were opposed to the rule of bishops, to the required use of the Book of Common Prayer, and many of the rituals of the Anglican establishment, which they believed were obstacles to true religion and godliness. They believed the majority of the common people were kept in bondage to forms and rituals, and as a result to false religion and spiritual ignorance.

The Puritans moreover wanted all the sins, rituals, and superstitions that "smacked of Roman Catholic idolatry" thoroughly abolished from the realm and from the churches, including; the mass, the surplice, kneeling at the Lord's Supper, vestments, graven images, profane and sexually immoral stage plays, and the widespread profanation of the Sabbath. The Puritans promoted a thorough doctrinal reformation that was Calvinistic, as well as a thorough reformation of the English church and society based on Scripture and not human tradition.

The Puritan movement in Elizabethan England was strengthened by the fact that many of Queen Elizabeth's top political advisers and court officials had close ties with Puritan leaders and were partial to Puritan views of theology, politics, and the reformation of the English church and society. They especially wanted to curb the power of the Anglican bishops and root out any influence of the Roman Catholic church. Such men in Elizabeth's court of advisers included William Cecil, Chief Adviser to the Queen, Secretary of State, and Lord High Treasurer; Francis Walsingham, the Principal Secretary to the Queen and Spymaster of the English Crown; Walter Mildmay, Chancellor of the Exchequer; and Robert Dudley, Earl of Leicester, a very close personal friend and one time suitor to the queen. It is evident that Elizabeth, though a committed Anglican, relied heavily on Puritan leaders for the support of the crown as well as her own personal and state counsel.

The chief poet of the Elizabethan era, Edmund Spenser, was a promoter of Puritan views. He is best known for The Faerie Queene, an epic poem and fantastical allegory celebrating the reign of Elizabeth I. In fact the Red Cross Knight, the chief hero of the poem, is designed to be the very image and model of Puritan virtue, and Una his betrothed a figure of the church purified from sin and idolatry.

The delicate balance and conflict between Anglicanism and Puritanism could be readily seen in one of the primary architects of the Anglican settlement, John Jewel. Jewel can be seen in many ways as both Anglican and Puritan, much like William Perkins at the end of the Elizabethan era. Jewel's Apology of the Church of England and his Book of Homilies are both quintessential to Anglicanism; and yet his "Essay on Holy Scripture" is in many ways Puritan.

Fundamental to the rise of English Puritanism in the Elizabethan era was the influence of four highly influential reformers: John Calvin, Henry Bullinger, Peter Martyr Vermigli, and Theodore Beza, who were all in frequent communication with the crown and the Reformed leaders in England. While Calvin and Bullinger praised Queen Elizabeth for the work of reformation in England and the Anglican establishment, and encouraging patience from the Puritans, Beza was more firm in his support of the Puritan movement. During the 1560s and 1570s, the works of Calvin were the most widely disseminated publications in England, while the works of Beza, Bullinger, and Vermigli also enjoyed popularity.

The Puritan movement was advanced by the work and ministry of John Knox and the Scottish Reformation that took place at the same time. Knox spent five years in England (1549–1554) assisting the English reformation in the time of Edward VI, fled to Geneva and spent several years with Calvin (1554–1559), and then returned to Scotland to spearhead the reformation of his home country from 1560 until his death in 1572. Knox's influence on the Puritan movement in England was significant. The British pastor and Puritan scholar Martyn Lloyd-Jones suggests that Knox could be called the first Puritan.

== Archiepiscopate of Matthew Parker, 1559–1575 ==
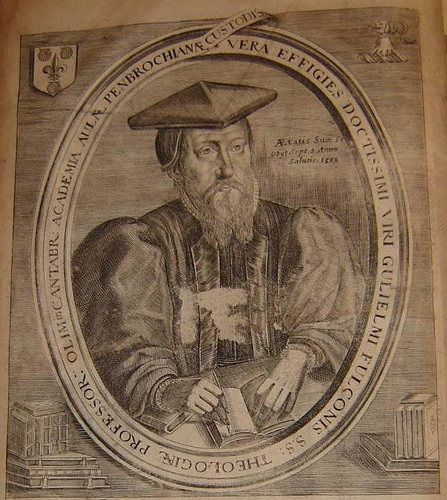
Cambridge professor William Fulke (1538–1589) encouraged his students not to wear their required vestments.

=== Convocation of 1562/3 ===
The Convocation of 1563 opened on 15 January 1562/3 with a sermon by William Day; he was one of leaders, prominent with Alexander Nowell (who had preached the day before at the opening of Parliament) and Thomas Sampson, of the reformers. The convocation approved the Thirty-nine Articles as a confessional statement for the Church of England. The bishops proposed further reforms of canon law and the liturgy. These included the elimination of vestments, the elimination of kneeling at communion, the elimination of the sign of the cross in baptism, and altering the forms of music used in church. During this convocation, the bishops formulated the so-called Alphabet bills, which they unsuccessfully introduced in the next two parliaments. Some of the clergy introduced these reforms in their congregations on their own initiative in the following years. For example, at Cambridge, William Fulke convinced his students not to wear their surplices and to hiss at students who did. As a result, Archbishop Parker published a set of Advertisements, requiring uniformity in clerical dress.

=== Vestments controversy, 1563–1569 ===
The Puritan faction objected loudly and appealed to the continental reformers to support their cause. Many of the continental reformers felt that the Puritans were just making trouble – for example, in a letter to Bishop Grindal, Bullinger accused the Puritans of displaying "a contentious spirit under the name of conscience". Grindal proceeded to publish the letter without Bullinger's permission. Beza was more supportive of the Puritan position, though he did not intervene too loudly because he feared angering the queen and he wanted the queen to intervene in France on behalf of the Huguenots. In response to clergymen refusing to wear their vestments, 37 ministers were suspended. In response, in 1569 some ministers began holding their own services, the first example of Puritan separatism.

=== Admonition to the Parliament (1572) and demand for Presbyterianism ===
Throughout the 1560s, England's return to Protestantism remained tentative, and large numbers of the people were committed to and sought a return to Catholicism. Three related events around 1570 ultimately led to the reinforcement of Protestantism in England. First, in the Rising of the North, the northern earls revolted, demanding a return to Catholicism. Second, Pope Pius V had issued the bull Regnans in Excelsis, absolving Catholics of their duty of allegiance to Elizabeth. Third, the Ridolfi plot sought to replace Elizabeth with Mary, Queen of Scots.

In response to this Catholic rebelliousness, the English government took several measures to shore up the Protestantism of the regime: all clergymen were required to subscribe to the Thirty-nine Articles; all laity were required to take communion according to the rite of the Book of Common Prayer in their home parish at least once per year; and it became a treasonable offence to say that the queen was a heretic or a schismatic.

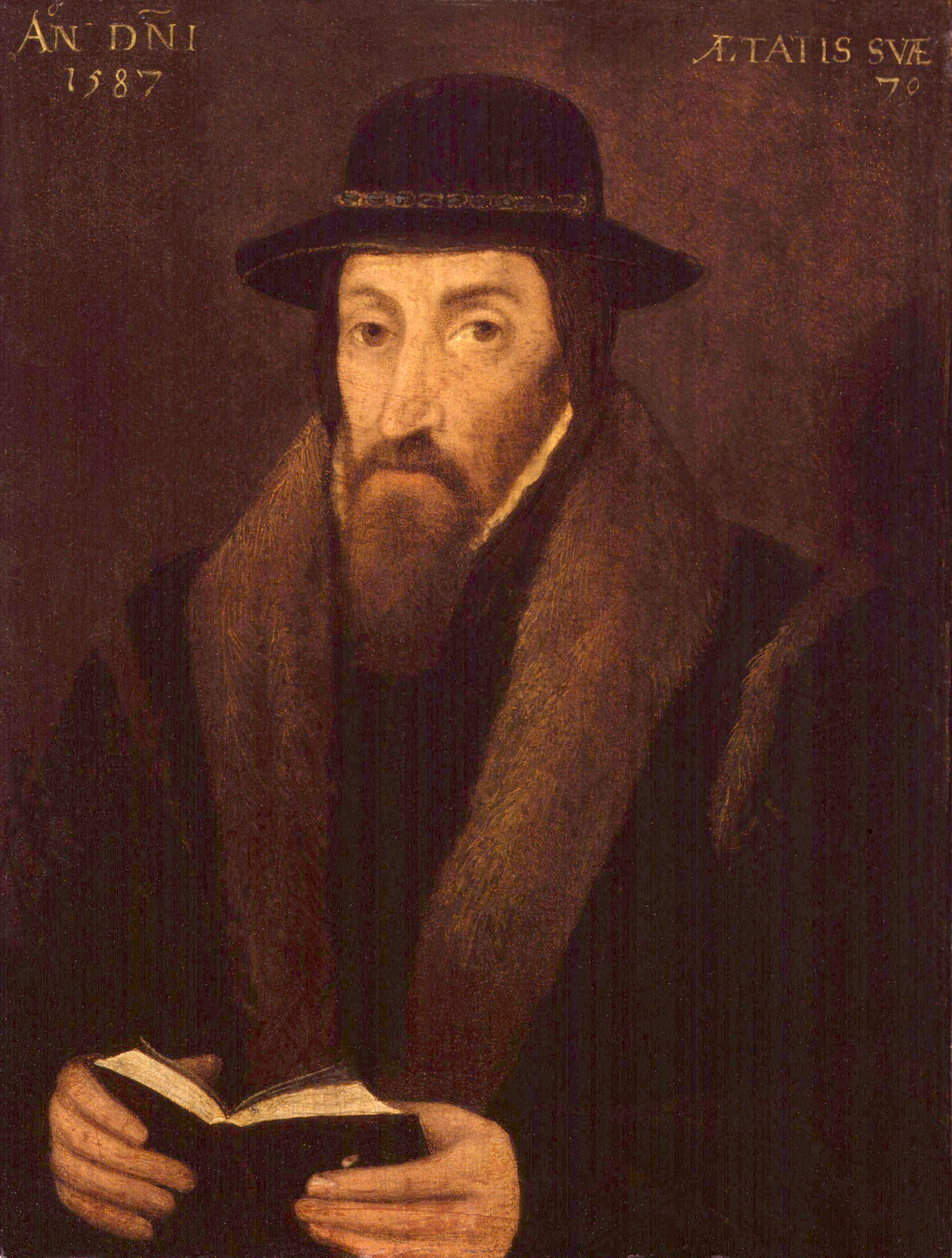
John Foxe (1517–1587) was a Puritan most famous for his book Foxe's Book of Martyrs, which chronicled the Marian Persecutions. In 1570, Foxe called for further reforms to the Church of England, but was rebuffed by the queen.

In this pro-Protestant, anti-Catholic environment, the Puritan faction sought to push further reforms on the Church of England. John Foxe and Thomas Norton presented a reform proposal initially drawn up under Edward VI to Parliament. Elizabeth quickly dismissed this proposal, however, insisting on adherence to the 1559 religious settlement. Meanwhile at Cambridge, professor Thomas Cartwright, a long-time opponent of vestments, offered a series of lectures in 1570 on the Book of Acts in which he called for the abolition of episcopacy and the creation of a presbyterian system of church governance in England.

Puritans were further dismayed when they learned that the bishops had decided to merge the vestiarian controversy into the requirement that clergy subscribe to the Thirty-nine Articles: at the time they swore their allegiance to the Thirty-nine Articles, the bishops also required all clergymen to swear that the use of the Book of Common Prayer and the wearing of vestments are not contrary to Scripture. Many of the Puritan clergymen were incensed at this requirement. A bill authorizing the bishops to permit deviations from the Book of Common Prayer in cases where the book required something contrary to a clergyman's conscience was presented and defeated at the next parliament.

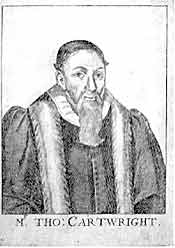
Thomas Cartwright (1535–1603), the leader of the Presbyterian movement in England during the reign of Elizabeth I

Meanwhile, at Cambridge, Vice-Chancellor John Whitgift moved against Cartwright, depriving Cartwright of his professorship and his fellowship in 1571. Under these circumstances, in 1572, two London clergymen—Thomas Wilcox and John Field—penned the first classic expression of Puritanism, their Admonition to the Parliament. According to the Admonition, the Puritans had long accepted the Book of Common Prayer, with all its deficiencies, because it promoted the peace and unity of the church. However, now that the bishops required them to subscribe to the Book of Common Prayer, the Puritans felt obliged to point out the popery and superstition contained in the book. The Admonition went on to call for more thorough church reforms, modelled on the reforms made by the Huguenots or by the Church of Scotland under the leadership of John Knox. The Admonition ended by denouncing the bishops and calling for the replacement of episcopalianism with presbyterianism.

The Admonition to Parliament set off a major controversy in England. Whitgift wrote an Answer denouncing the Admonition, which in turn led to Cartwright's 1573 Replye to An Answere Made of M. Doctor Whitgift Agaynste the Admonition to the Parliament, a second Puritan classic. Cartwright argued that a properly reformed church must contain the four orders of ministers identified by Calvin: teaching elders, ruling elders, deacons and theological professors. Cartwright went on to denounce the subjection of any minister in the church to any other minister in the strongest possible terms. In a Second Replye, Cartwright was even more forceful, arguing that any pre-eminence accorded to any minister in the church violated divine law. Furthermore, he went on to assert that a presbyterian hierarchy of presbyteries and synods was required by divine law. In 1574, Walter Travers, an ally of Cartwright, published a Full and Plaine Declaration of Ecclesiasticall Discipline, setting forth a scheme of reform in greater detail than Cartwright had.

The government moved against all three of these Puritan leaders: Field and Wilcox were imprisoned for a year, while Cartwright fled to exile on the continent to avoid such a fate. In the end, however, the number of clergymen who refused to subscribe to the bishops' requirements proved to be too large, and a number of qualified subscriptions were allowed.

== Archiepiscopate of Edmund Grindal, 1575–1583 ==
The reign of Grindal as Archbishop of Canterbury (1575–1583) was relatively tranquil compared with that of his predecessor. The major issue came in 1581, when Robert Browne and his congregation at Bury St Edmunds withdrew from communion in the Church of England, citing the Church of England's dumb (i.e. non-preaching) ministry, and the lack of proper church discipline. Browne and his followers, known as the Brownists, were forced into exile in the Low Countries. There, they were encouraged by Cartwright, who was serving as minister to the Merchant Adventurers at Middelburg. Cartwright, however, opposed separatism. Like most Puritans, he advocated further reforms to the Church of England from within.

A second Puritan development under Grindal was the rise of the Puritan prophesying, modelled on the Zurich Prophezei (Puritans learned of the practice through the congregation of refugees from Zurich established in London), where ministers met weekly to discuss "profitable questions". These "profitable questions" included the correct use of Sabbath, an initial sign of the Sabbatarianism of the English Puritans. The queen objected to the growth of the conventicling movement and ordered Grindal to suppress them. When Grindal refused, citing I Cor. 14, he was disgraced and placed under virtual house arrest for the rest of his tenure as archbishop. The conventicles resumed after a brief period of suspension.

== Archiepiscopate of John Whitgift, 1583–1604 ==
Whitgift had been a vocal opponent of Cartwright. He believed that the matter of church governance was adiaphora, a "matter indifferent", and that the church should accommodate with the state in which the church was located. The Church of England was located in a monarchy, so the church should adopt an episcopal style of government.

=== Renewed calls for Presbyterianism ===
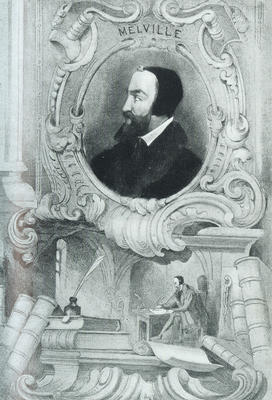
Andrew Melville (1545–1622), a Scottish churchman who came to England to avoid the effect of Scotland's Black Acts of 1583–1585, encouraged the English Puritans to seek further reforms to the Church of England.

The years 1583–1585 saw the brief ascendancy in Scotland of James Stewart, who claimed the title of Earl of Arran. This period saw Scotland pass the Black Acts, which outlawed the Second Book of Discipline. As a response, many Scottish ministers, including Andrew Melville, sought refuge in England. These refugees participated in the English conventicles (as did John Field, once released from prison) and convinced many English Puritans that they should renew their fight to establish presbyterianism in England. As such, in the 1584 Parliament, Puritans introduced legislation to replace the Book of Common Prayer with the Genevan Book of Order and to introduce presbyterianism. This effort failed.

At this point, Field, Travers, and Cartwright were all free and back in England and determined to draft a new order for the Church of England. They drafted a Book of Discipline, which circulated in 1586 and which they hoped would be accepted by the 1586 Parliament. Again, the Puritan effort failed in Parliament.

=== Martin Marprelate, 1588–1589, and response ===
In 1588–1589, a series of virulently anti-episcopal tracts were published under the pseudonym of Martin Marprelate. These Marprelate tracts, likely published by Job Throckmorton and Welsh publisher John Penry, denounced the bishops as agents of Antichrist, the strongest possible denunciation for Christians. The Marprelate tracts called the bishops "our vile servile dunghill ministers of damnation, that viperous generation, those scorpions."

In the mid- to late-1580s several defenders of the Puritans in the English government died: Francis Russell, 2nd Earl of Bedford in 1585; Robert Dudley, 1st Earl of Leicester in 1588; and Francis Walsingham in 1590. In these circumstances, Richard Bancroft (Whitgift's chaplain) led a crackdown against the Puritans. Cartwright and eight other Puritan leaders were imprisoned for 18 months, before facing trial in the Star Chamber. The conventicles were disbanded.

Some Puritans followed Browne's lead and withdrew from the Church of England. Several of those separatists were arrested in the woods near Islington in 1593, and John Greenwood and Henry Barrowe were executed for advocating separatism. Followers of Greenwood and Barrowe fled to the Netherlands and formed the basis of the Pilgrims, who later founded the Plymouth Colony in North America.

1593 also saw the English parliament pass the Religion Act (35 Elizabeth c. 1) and the Popish Recusants Act (35 Elizabeth c. 2), which provided that those worshipping outside the Church of England had three months in which to either conform to the Church of England or else abjure the realm, forfeiting their lands and goods to the crown, with failure to abjure being a capital offence. Although these acts were directed against Roman Catholics who refused to conform to the Church of England, on their face they also applied to many of the Puritans. Although no Puritans were executed under these laws, they remained a constant threat and source of anxiety to the Puritans.

=== Drive to create a preaching ministry ===
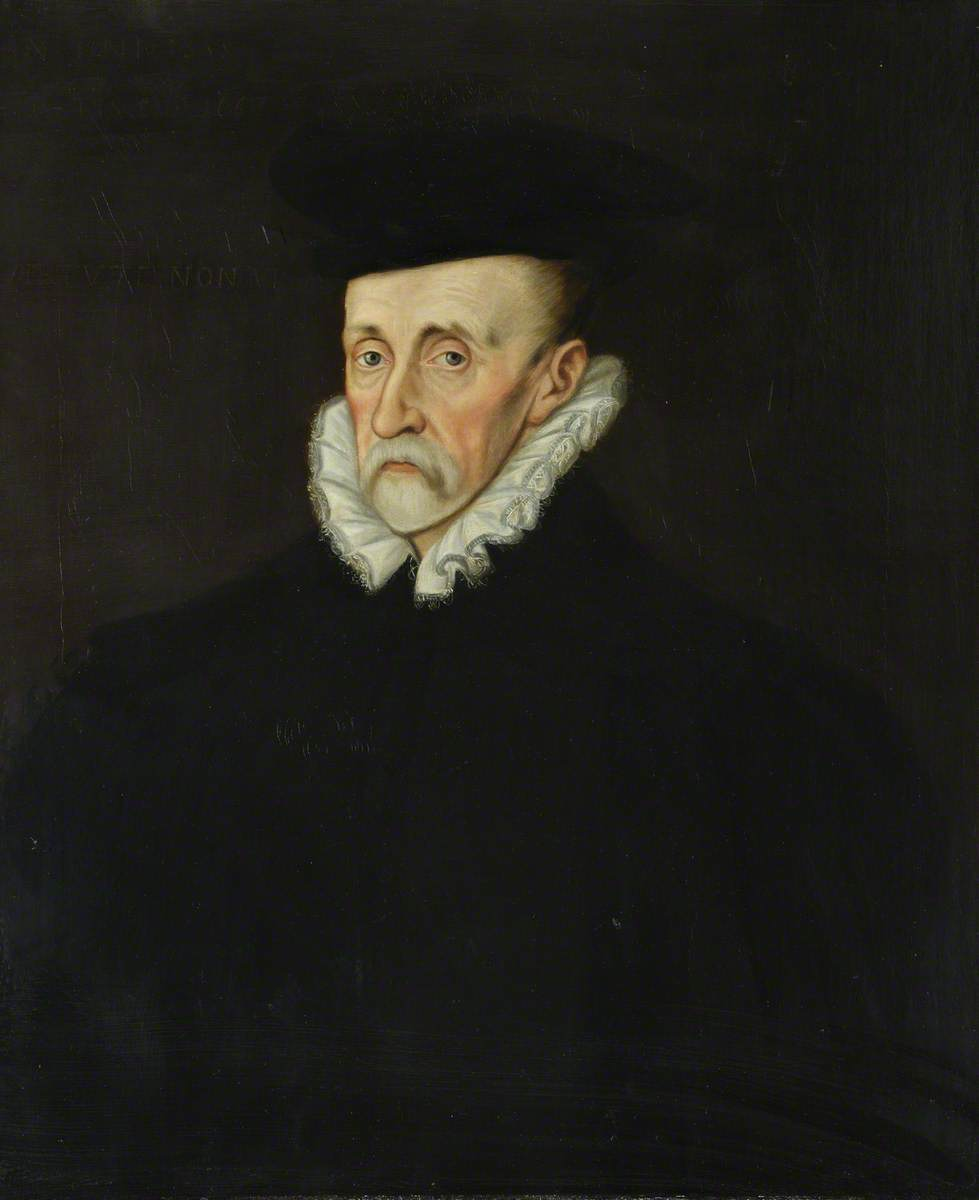
Sir Walter Mildmay (bef. 1523–1589), who founded Emmanuel College, Cambridge in 1584 to promote the training of Puritan ministers.

One of the most important aspects of the Puritan movement was its insistence on having a preaching ministry throughout the country. At the time of the Elizabethan religious settlement, less than 10 per cent of the 40,000 English parish clergy was licensed to preach. (Since the time of the repression of the Lollards in the 14th century, it had been illegal for an ordained parish priest to preach to his congregation without first obtaining a licence from his bishop.) Elizabeth had been no fan of preaching and preferred a church service focused on the Prayer Book liturgy. However, many of Elizabeth's bishops did support the development of a preaching ministry and, aided by wealthy laymen, were able to dramatically expand the number of qualified preachers in the country.

For example, Sir Walter Mildmay founded Emmanuel College, Cambridge in 1584 to promote the training of preaching ministers. The great Puritan preacher and scholar Laurence Chaderton was the principal of the college. He was close friends and associates of Cartwright, Richard Rogers, Richard Greenham, John Dod, and William Perkins, each of whom had a major influence on the rise of English Puritanism. Frances Sidney, Countess of Sussex similarly founded Sidney Sussex College, Cambridge in 1596. Emmanuel and Sidney Sussex became the homes of academic Puritanism.

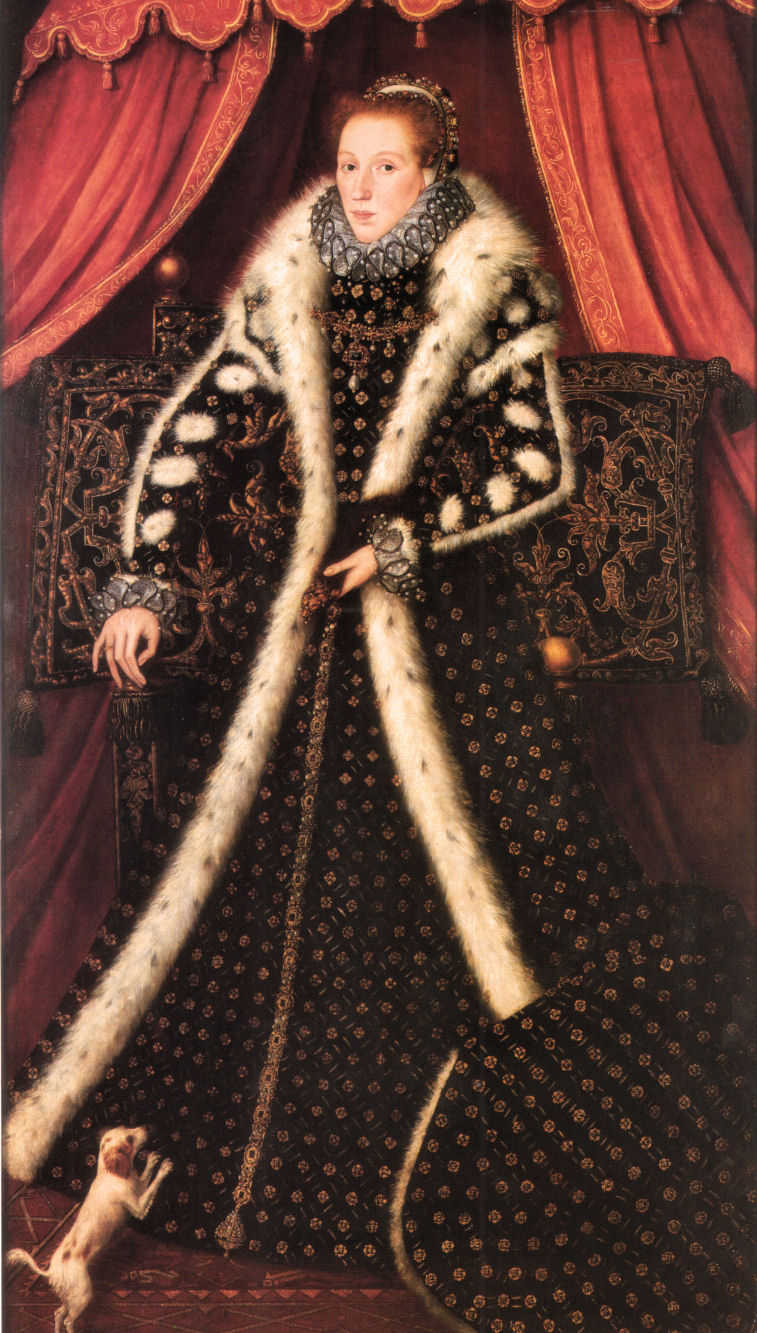
Frances Sidney, Countess of Sussex (1531–1589), who founded Sidney Sussex College, Cambridge in 1596 to promote the training of Puritan ministers

Although the number of preachers increased dramatically over the course of Elizabeth's reign, there were still insufficient preachers in the country. A layman who wanted to hear a sermon might have to travel to another parish in order to find one with a preaching minister. When he got there, he might find that the preaching minister had shortened the liturgy to allow more time for preaching.

Trained ministers were more likely to offer extemporaneous prayer instead of reading the set prayer out of the Prayer Book. Thus two different styles developed in the Church of England: a traditional style, focused on the liturgy of the Book of Common Prayer; and the Puritan style, focused on preaching with less ceremony and shorter or extemporaneous prayers. One of the greatest of the Elizabethan Puritan preachers was Henry Smith, whose eloquence in the pulpit won him the epithet "Silver-tongued Smith".

=== Experimental predestinarianism ===
Following the suppression of Puritanism in the wake of the Marprelate tracts, Puritans in England assumed a more low-key approach in the 1590s. Ministers who favoured further reforms increasingly turned their attention away from structural reforms to the Church of England, instead choosing to focus on individual, personal holiness. Theologians such as William Perkins of Cambridge continued to maintain the rigorously high standards of previous Puritans but focused on improving individual, as opposed to collective, righteousness. A characteristic Puritan focus during this period was for more rigorous keeping of the Christian Sabbath. Perkins is credited with introducing Beza's version of double predestination to the English Puritans, a view which he popularized through the use of a chart he created known as "The Golden Chain".

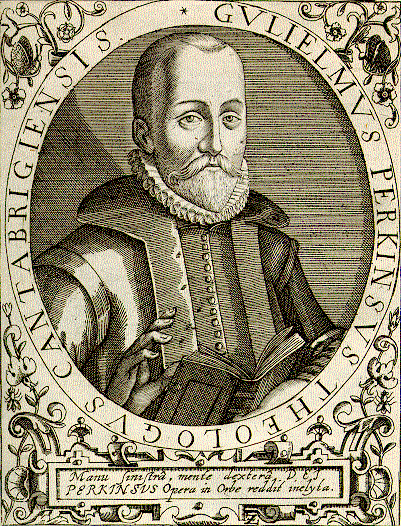
William Perkins (1558–1602), a Puritan theologian who espoused strict moral standards during the reign of Elizabeth I and championed "experimental predestinarianism"

In 1970, R. T. Kendall labelled the form of religion practised by Perkins and his followers as experimental predestinarianism, a position that Kendall contrasted with credal predestinarianism. Kendall identified credal predestinarians as anyone who accepted the Calvinist teaching on predestination. Experimental predestinarians, however, went beyond merely adhering to the doctrine of predestination, teaching that it was possible for individuals to know experimentally that they were saved and a member of God's elect predestined for eternal life. (The credal predestinarians believed that only some were destined for eternal life, but that it was impossible in this life to identify who was elect and who was reprobate.) Puritans who adopted Perkins' brand of experimental predestinarianism felt obliged, once they had undergone a religious process to attain knowledge of their election, to seek out like-minded individuals who had undergone similar religious experiences.

In time, some Puritan clergymen and laity, who increasingly referred to themselves as "the godly", began to view themselves as distinct from the regular members of the Church of England, who had not undergone an emotional conversion experience. At times, this tendency led for calls for "the godly" to separate themselves from the Church of England. While the majority of Puritans remained "non-separating Puritans", they nevertheless came to constitute a distinct social group within the Church of England by the turn of the 17th century.

In the reign of King James I, "the Puritan" as a type was common enough that fiercely Anglican playwright Ben Jonson could satirize Puritans in the form of the characters Tribulation and Ananais in The Alchemist (1610) and Zeal-of-the-land Busy in Bartholomew Fair (1614). So by the end of the Elizabethan era, Anglican and Puritan factions were at times in deep conflict, as many of the Puritans would often satirize the Anglican church, with its rituals and bishops as being subversive of true religion and godliness. At the same time the Puritan movement had ministers and magistrates that held to either congregational, presbyterial, or episcopal forms of church government.

The climax and the brilliance of the Elizabethan Puritan movement can be especially seen in three of the greatest men of that era and their works: 1. The theological treatises of William Perkins. 2. The sermons of Henry Smith. And 3. The poetry of Edmund Spenser.

== Notable Puritans ==
- John Foxe (1516–1587) the historian and author of Acts and Monuments, known as "Foxe's Book of Martyrs," an account of Christian martyrs throughout Western history, emphasising the sufferings of English Protestants during the reign of Mary I.
- Thomas Norton (1532–1584) lawyer, politician, literary scholar and anti-Catholic pamphleteer was also the translator of John Calvin's Institutes of the Christian Religion into English.
- Myles Coverdale (1488–1569) English reformer, Bible translator, and one time Bishop of Exeter known for his preaching and Biblical scholarship.
- William Whittingham (1524–1579) preacher, Biblical scholar and translator of the Geneva Bible who was known for his friendships with John Knox, John Calvin, and Henry Bullinger. When he returned to England he promoted Presbyterianism and preaching conventicles.
- Laurence Humphrey (1527–1590) scholar and theologian, who was President of Magdalen College, Oxford, and Dean successively of Gloucester and Winchester. He made them strongholds of Puritanism. He played a leading part in the vestments controversy.
- David Whitehead (1492?–1571) scholar and theologian who refused the appointment of Archbishop of Canterbury on account of his Puritan convictions.
- Thomas Sampson (1517–1589) preacher, Biblical scholar, Marian exile, and one of the Geneva Bible translators. With Laurence Humphrey, he played a leading part in the vestments controversy.
- Anthony Gilby (1510–1585) preacher, scholar, translator of the Geneva Bible, who was known for his Biblical commentaries on the prophets Micah and Malachi. He also wrote a widely circulated "Treatise on the Doctrine of Election."
- Christopher Goodman (1520–1603) a preacher and Marian exile who spent years with John Knox as a friend and associate working with him on the Scottish Reformation. Goodman eventually returned to England before his death. He was best known for his treatise on political theology, "How Superior Powers Ought to be Obeyed."
- Richard Greenham (1535–1594) preacher, scholar, and theologian, known for his close friendship with William Perkins and his devotional treatises including his "Treatise on the Sabbath."
- Thomas Cartwright (1535–1603) preacher, scholar, and controversialist, considered the patriarch of the Presbyterian movement within Puritanism. He was known for his disputations and letters as well as his brief Commentary on Paul's Letter to the Colossians.
- Laurence Chaderton (1536–1640) first Master of Emmanuel College, Cambridge and one of the translators of the King James Version of the Bible. Chaderton lived over 100 years, and was known as the great patriarch of the Puritan movement.
- Edward Dering (1540–1576) fiery preacher, classical scholar, controversialist, and supporter of Thomas Cartwright. Dering was constantly in trouble from 1570 being a vigorous opponent of episcopacy.
- William Fulke (1538–1589) preacher, scholar, and controversialist who took a leading part in the Vestments controversy
- Thomas Wilcox (1549–1608) preacher, scholar, and controversialist best known for his call for reformation titled "An Admonition to Parliament."
- Walter Travers (1545–1638) scholar and theologian best known for his opposition to the Anglican ecclesiastic views of Richard Hooker.
- Arthur Dent (1545–1607) preacher and theologian known for his sermons and devotional works, including and especially "The Plain Man's Pathway to "Heaven."
- John Knewstub (1544–1624) preacher and scholar who was a participant in the Hampton Court Conference of 1604 representing the Puritan side. He was a Presbyterian by conviction, but moderate in his Puritan views.
- John Field (1545–1588) scholar and controversialist who assisted Thomas Wilcox in the writing and publication of "An Admonition to Parliament."
- Job Throckmorton (1545–1601) Puritan activist, pamphleteer, and Member of Parliament. He is recognized by most to be the author of the Martin Mar-prelate tracts (anti-clerical satires), along with John Penry and John Udall.
- Andrew Melville (1545–1622) Scottish scholar, theologian and religious reformer following John Knox, whose fame encouraged scholars from the European continent to study in Scotland at Glasgow and St. Andrews.
- John Dod (1549–1645) nonconformist preacher and expositor of Scripture known for his Exposition of the Ten Commandments, which gave him the nickname of Decalogue Dod.
- Robert Browne (1550–1633) preacher and founder of the Brownists, early Separatists from the Church of England before 1620. In later life he was reconciled to the established church and became an Anglican minister. He became known for his two earliest works, "A True and Short Declaration," and "A Treatise of Reformation without Tarrying."
- Henry Barrowe (1550–1593) Separatist Puritan, who advocated congregational independency. He was executed, along with John Greenwood, for his political views which were considered seditious.
- John Greenwood (1556–1593) Separatist Puritan who also advocated congregationalist views. He was executed along with Henry Barrowe for his radical political views which were considered seditious.
- Eusebius Pagit (1551–1617) preacher and nonconformist known for his many sermons and his ardent support of Thomas Cartwright.
- John Udall (1550–1592) preacher and controversialist associated with the Martin Mar-prelate tracts. He was prosecuted by Anglican authorities for his many controversial polemical works.
- Richard Rogers (1550–1618) fellow of Emmanuel College, Cambridge known for his strong Biblical preaching, whose "Seven Treatises" on the Christian Life were foundational to the Puritan movement.
- Henry Smith (1560–1591) preacher who lived for only 31 years, and preached for only 5–7 years; and was known as the most eloquent preacher of the Elizabethan age.
- William Perkins (1558–1602) Master of Emmanuel College, Cambridge, who was the most prolific Puritan theologian and expositor of Scripture during the Elizabethan era. Perkins is best known for his "Golden Chain of Theology" and his commentary on Paul's letter to the Galatians.
