= Patrick Collinson =

English historian (1929-2011)

Patrick Collinson CBE FBA FAHA
- Born: 10 August 1929; Ipswich, Suffolk, England
- Died: 28 September 2011 (aged 82)
- Occupations: Historian and academic
- Title: Regius Professor of Modern History
- Spouse: Elizabeth Selwyn (m. 1960)
- Children: 4
- Parent: Belle Patrick

Academic background
- Education: Bethany School; Huntingdon Grammar School; King's School, Ely
- Alma mater: Pembroke College, Cambridge; University College London
- Thesis: The Puritan classical movement in the reign of Elizabeth I (1957)
- Doctoral advisor: J. E. Neale

Academic work
- Discipline: History
- Sub-discipline: Early modern Britain; History of Protestantism; Political history; History of the Puritans under Elizabeth I
- Institutions: University of Khartoum; King's College London; University of Sydney; University of Kent; University of Sheffield; Trinity College, Cambridge
- Doctoral students: Bill Shields; Alexandra Walsham
- Notable students: Desmond Tutu
- Notable works: The Elizabethan Puritan Movement (1967)

Patrick "Pat" Collinson CBE FBA FAHA (10 August 1929 – 28 September 2011) was an English historian, known as a writer on the Elizabethan era, particularly Elizabethan Puritanism. He was emeritus Regius Professor of Modern History, University of Cambridge, having occupied the chair from 1988 to 1996. He once described himself as "an early modernist with a prime interest in the history of England in the sixteenth and seventeenth centuries."

== Life ==
Collinson was born in Ipswich, the son of Cecil Collinson and Belle Hay Patrick. His father came from a Yorkshire Quaker family, and both Patrick's parents were Christian missionaries. He later wrote that his childhood home was "an evangelical hothouse where the Second Coming was expected daily". Before he was 20, he was baptised at Bethesda Chapel in Ipswich.

After a short spell at Bethany School in Goudhurst, Kent, and Huntingdon Grammar School, Collinson was educated at King's Ely, and Pembroke College, Cambridge from 1949 to 1952. He was also trained as a radar mechanic during his national service in the Royal Air Force. He became a postgraduate student at the University of London in 1952 under the supervision of the Tudor historian J. E. Neale, who handed him some notes on East Anglian Puritanism; in 1957 Collinson completed his doctorate on Elizabethan Puritanism, its 1,200-page size causing the administration to impose a word limit on future dissertations; it was published in 1967 as The Elizabethan Puritan Movement, which showed Puritanism to be a significant force within the Elizabethan Anglican Church instead of merely a radical group of individuals, becoming a standard work.

Collinson was a lecturer at the University of Khartoum, and from 1961 assistant lecturer in ecclesiastical history at King's College London (where he taught Desmond Tutu). In 1960 he married Elizabeth Albinia Susan Selwyn, a nurse. He thought about becoming an Anglican minister but in the end chose not to.

In 1969 Collinson emigrated to Australia to become chair of the history department of Sydney University. Although he appreciated a more open-minded approach favouring interdisciplinary studies, he opposed what he termed the "fungus" of postmodernism and so returned to England in 1976 as professor of history at the University of Kent. Two years earlier he had been elected a fellow of the Australian Academy of the Humanities. In 1979 he delivered the Ford Lectures at the University of Oxford, taking as his subject "The religion of Protestants: the church in English society, 1559–1625". In 1981 he delivered the Birkbeck Lecture in Ecclesiastical History at the University of Cambridge. He was President of the Ecclesiastical History Society (1985-86). He was chair of modern history at the University of Sheffield from 1984 to 1988 before he succeeded Sir Geoffrey Elton as Cambridge Regius Professor of History, where his attempt to reform the tripos failed due to opposition from within; his inaugural lecture was entitled "De Republica Anglorum: Or, History with the Politics Put Back."

By the time of his retirement in 1996, Collinson was one of the doyens of English Reformation history. His short summation of the period, The Reformation, was published in 2003. Collinson's work laid the foundations, in many ways, for what historians of the English Reformation currently term the 'Calvinist Consensus' in the latter decades of the 16th century and during the reign of James I/VI. As such, the belief that Puritanism was anything but religiously radical in relation to English, and indeed British, culture stands as one of his great achievements as an historian.

In July 2000 Collinson was awarded an honorary doctorate from the University of Essex. In 2011 Boydell Press published Collinson's memoir The History of a History Man Or, the Twentieth Century Viewed from a Safe Distance: The Memoirs of Patrick Collinson as part of its Church of England Record Society Series. Collinson was the founding president of the society in 1991.

Collinson's political views were left-wing; he was a republican and a supporter of the Campaign for Nuclear Disarmament.

== Works ==
- Letters of Thomas Wood, Puritan, 1566–1577 (ed.) (1960)
- A Mirror of Elizabethan Puritanism: The Life and Letters of Godly Master Dering (London: Dr. Wiliams's Trust, 1964) search online
- The Elizabethan Puritan Movement (Methuen, 1967) read online
- Archbishop Grindal, 1519–1583: The Struggle for a Reformed Church (London: J. Cape, 1979) search online read online (2021 edition: ISBN 9780520370500)
- The Religion of Protestants: The Church in English Society, 1559–1625, Ford Lectures, (Oxford: Clarendon Press, 1982) ISBN 9780198200536 search online
- English Puritanism (London: Historical Association, 1983) ISBN 9780852782613 search online read online
- Godly People: Essays on English Protestantism and Puritanism (London: Hambledon Press, 1983) ISBN 9780907628156 search online read online
- The Birthpangs of Protestant England: Religious and Cultural Change in the Sixteenth and Seventeenth Centuries: The Third Anstey Memorial Lectures in the University of Kent at Canterbury, 12–15 May 1986 (Macmillan, 1988) search online
- Andrew Perne: Quartercentenary Studies: Patrick Collinson, David McKitterick, Elisabeth Leedham-Green, edited by David McKitterick (Cambridge University Library, 1991) search online
- Elizabethan Essays (London: Hambledon Press, 1994) search online
- A History of Canterbury Cathedral, edited by Patrick Collinson, Nigel Ramsay, and Margaret Sparks (Oxford University Press, 1995) search online
- Belief and Practice in Reformation England: A Tribute to Patrick Collinson from His Students, edited by Susan Wabuda and Caroline Litzenberger) (Aldershot, Hants, 1998) search online ISBN 9781859284308
- Short Oxford History of the British Isles: The Sixteenth Century (editor) (Oxford University Press, 2002) ISBN 9780198207672 review
- Lady Margaret Beaufort and Her Professors of Divinity at Cambridge: 1502 to 1649 (Cambridge University Press, 2003) read online
- Elizabethans (London: Hambledon and London, 2003) ISBN 9781852854003 search online read online
- The Reformation: A History (Modern Library, 2003) ISBN 9780679643234 read online
- Elizabeth I (Very Interesting People Series, 2007) read online
- From Cranmer to Sancroft: Essays on English Religion in the Sixteenth and Seventeenth Centuries (Bloomsbury Publishing, 2007) ISBN 9781852851187 read online
- The Reception of Continental Reformation in Britain, edited by Polly Ha and Patrick Collinson (Oxford University Press, 2010) ISBN 9780197264683 search online read online
- The History of a History Man; Or, the Twentieth Century Viewed from a Safe Distance: The Memoirs of Patrick Collinson (Woodbridge, Suffolk: Boydell Press, 2011) (Church of England Record Society Series). ISBN 978-1-84383-627-8. review review
- Richard Bancroft and Elizabethan Anti-Puritanism (Cambridge University Press, 2013) ISBN 9781107023345 review

== Notes ==
Professional and academic associations
Preceded by Henry Chadwick	President of the Ecclesiastical History Society; 1985–1986	Succeeded by Michael Wilks
Preceded by Geoffrey Elton	Regius Professor of Modern History, University of Cambridge; 1988-1996	Succeeded by Quentin Skinner
