= Puritan choir =

The Puritan choir was a theory advanced by historian Sir John Neale of an influential movement of radical English Protestants in the Elizabethan Parliament. In his biography Queen Elizabeth I Neale argues that throughout her reign Elizabeth I faced increasingly organised and dominant opposition to her policies in the House of Commons and that this strengthening of Parliament sowed the seeds for the English Civil War.

== Neale's thesis ==
Neale, when researching the politics of Elizabeth's reign, discovered a pamphlet naming forty-three members of the House of Commons of 1566 as members of a Puritan movement. The pamphlet consisted of forty-three names, each followed by a witty Latin tag, many from the scripture as well as a single English word associated with the individual. He stressed their importance in helping to shape the 1559 Elizabethan Religious Settlement more along the lines of Calvin's Geneva suggesting that 'the House of Commons went full-cry after its radical leaders, sweeping aside any feeble Catholic opposition'. They were also influential, he argues, in pushing for the execution of Mary, Queen of Scots and Elizabeth's naming of a successor. Particularly significant was the role played in parliament by Thomas Norton, among the individuals named on the list, who became a leading figure in the Elizabethan House of Commons.

== Revisionist criticism ==
The historian Norman Jones has, however, argued that the 'Puritan Choir' is a misinterpretation of evidence. He maintains that in framing the religious settlement, Elizabeth faced opposition not from the forty-three alleged Puritans in the House of Commons, but rather from Catholic resistance and conservatism in the House of Lords which she and Cecil had underestimated. The influence that the 'Puritan Choir' could have feasibly had on the Elizabethan Religious Settlement has also been questioned by Haigh. Of the forty-three individuals named as part of 'our choir' in Neale's document, only twenty-two of them were definitely Protestants. Furthermore, only nineteen Marian exiles were elected to the 1559 parliament, and some were unable to play any role in the Parliamentary session as they returned too late. The influence of the twenty identifiable Catholics in the 1559 House of Commons is also ignored under Neale's 'Puritan Choir' thesis.
