= Thomas Cartwright (theologian) =

English Puritan churchman (c. 1535 – 1603)

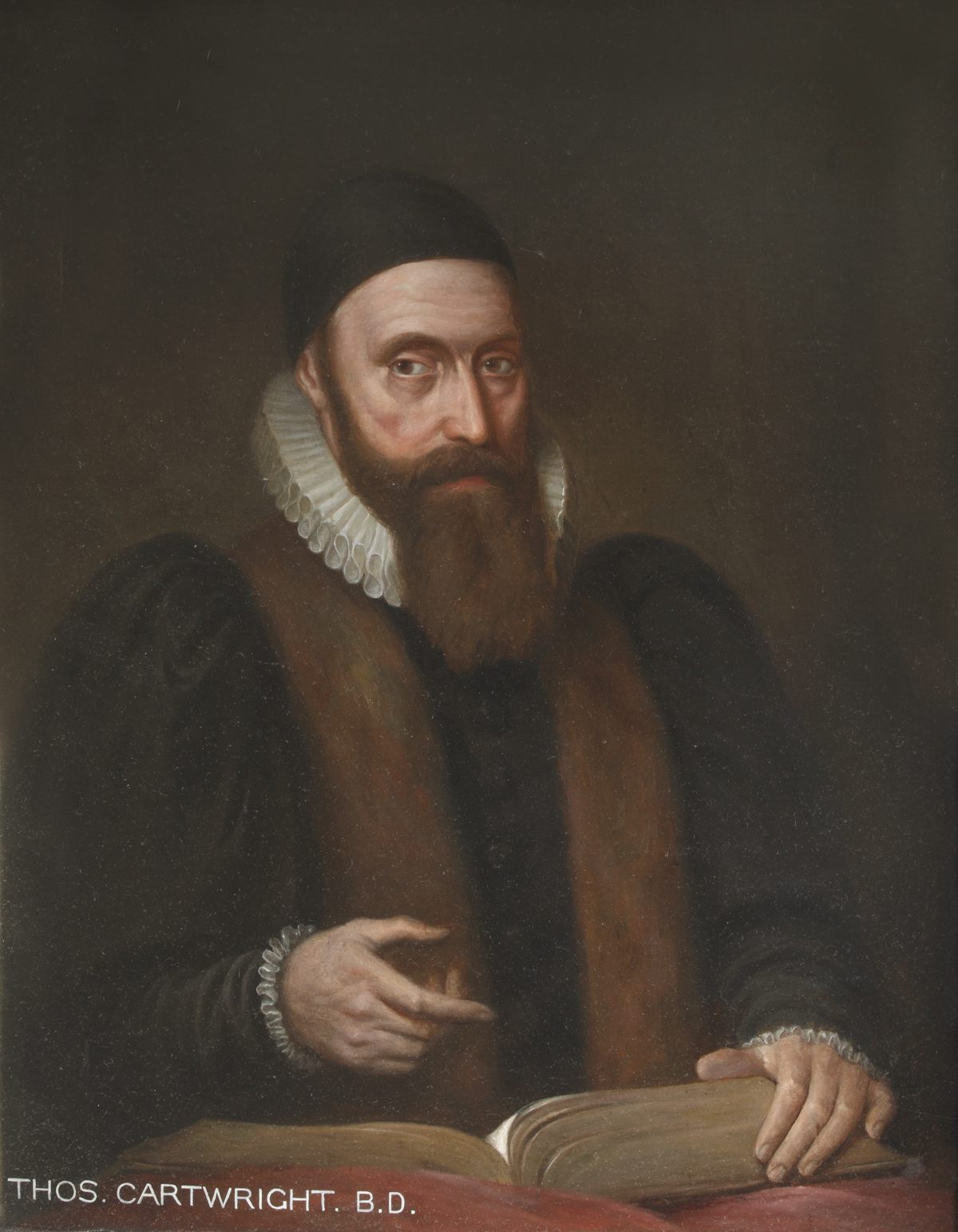
- Portrait by Gustavus Ellinthorpe Sintzenich, at Mansfield College, Oxford
- Born: c. 1535; Royston, Hertfordshire
- Died: 27 December 1603; Warwick
- Occupation: Educator

Thomas Cartwright (c. 1535 – 27 December 1603) was an English Puritan preacher and theologian.

== Background and education ==
Cartwright was probably born in Royston, Hertfordshire, and studied divinity at St John's College, Cambridge. On the accession of Queen Mary I in 1553, he was forced to leave university, and found occupation as clerk to a counsellor-at-law. On the accession of Queen Elizabeth I, five years later, he resumed his theological studies, and was soon afterwards elected a fellow of St John's and later of Trinity College, Cambridge.

== Theological stance ==
In 1564, Cartwright opposed Thomas Preston in a theological disputation held on the occasion of Elizabeth's state visit, and in the following year brought attention to the Puritan attitude on church ceremonial and organisation. He was popular in Ireland as chaplain to Adam Loftus, Archbishop of Armagh (1565–1567). In 1569, Cartwright was appointed Lady Margaret's Professor of Divinity at Cambridge. In 1570 he delivered the "first public call for Presbyterianism" in the Church of England. In response John Whitgift, on becoming vice-chancellor, deprived him of the post in December 1570, and—as master of Trinity—of his fellowship in September 1571.

This was a result of the use which Cartwright had made of his position; in the sermons in which he made a public call for Presbyterianism he criticised the hierarchy and constitution of the Church of England, which he compared unfavourably with the primitive Christian organisation. So keen was the struggle between him and Whitgift that the chancellor, William Cecil, had to intervene. After his deprivation by Whitgift, Cartwright visited Theodore Beza at Geneva. He returned to England in 1572, and might have become professor of Hebrew at Cambridge but for his expressed sympathy with the notorious "Admonition to the Parliament" by John Field and Thomas Wilcox. To escape arrest he again went abroad, and officiated as clergyman to the English residents at Antwerp and then at Middelburg.

== Later years ==
In 1576 Cartwright visited and organised the Huguenot churches of the Channel Islands, and after revising the Rhenish version of the New Testament, again settled as pastor at Antwerp, declining the offer of a chair at the University of St Andrews. In 1585, he returned without permission to London, was imprisoned for a short time, and became master of the Earl of Leicester's hospital at Warwick, known as the Lord Leycester Hospital in the same year. In 1590, he was summoned before the court of high commission and imprisoned, and in 1591 he was once more committed to the Fleet prison. He was not treated harshly, and powerful influence soon secured his release. He visited Guernsey (1595–1598), and spent his closing years in honour and prosperity at Warwick, where he died 27 December 1603.

== Qualities and character ==
Cartwright was a man of much culture and originality, but said to be exceedingly impulsive. His views were distinctly Presbyterian, and he stoutly opposed the Brownists or Independents. He never conceived of a separation between church and state, and may have refused to tolerate any non-conformity with the reformed national Presbyterian church. However, it is believed that the Puritanism of the day owed its systematisation and much of its force to him.
