= John Field (Puritan) =

British Puritan clergyman (1545–1588)

John Field (1545–1588), also called John Fielde or Feilde, was a British Puritan clergyman and controversialist.

== Life ==
Born in London in 1545, when he was ordained by Edmund Grindal in 1566 at the age of 21, he was called a bachelor of arts of Christ Church, Oxford. Field's ordination was irregular, as the canonical age for ordination in the British church was 24 (or 23, if the person shows an unusual gift). In 1568, he became a lecturer, curate, and schoolmaster in London, which was his native city. There he quickly became a leader of the most extreme branch of the Puritan movement. He was so strident in his criticisms of the Church of England that he was debarred from preaching for eight years, from 1571 to 1579. He was insistent on changing the Act of Uniformity to purge what he regarded as Roman Catholic tendencies in British practice.

When he was unable to effect any changes, he wrote A View of Popish Abuses yet remaining in the English Church in 1572. The tract is bitter and harsh in its satire and complaint, and it was published abroad with Thomas Wilcox's Admonition to Parliament. In mid-June 1572, both Wilcox and Field were arrested, and in October sentenced to a year's imprisonment for the publication and breaking the Act of Uniformity.

During Archbishop of Canterbury John Whitgift's increasing push for conformity, Field proposed to organise the Puritans in England into a hierarchy of Presbyterian synods, a decrease in formalism and gesture in public prayer, and a greater emphasis on preaching. He was unable to get the other Puritan communities to cooperate, however. In 1585, he again drew legal sanction and was barred from preaching, but this punishment was less than that which had been sought, as Field had friends on the Queen's Council surrounding Elizabeth. He is probably the author of some of the Marprelate Tracts.

He died sometime in 1588, and was buried at St Giles-without-Cripplegate church on 26 March 1588.

== Family ==
One of his sons was the dramatist and actor Nathan Field (not to be confused with his brother Nathaniel, a printer); another, Theophilus Field, became the Bishop of Llandaff.
