= Thomas Wilcox =

British Puritan clergyman (c. 1549 – 1608)

Thomas Wilcox (c. 1549 – 1608) was a British Puritan clergyman and controversialist.

== Life ==
In 1571, with John Field he authored the Admonition to Parliament, that called for the removal of bishops and ecclesiastical hierarchy. Wilcox and Field were imprisoned for one year for this. Wilcox and Field appealed to Lord Burghley (in Latin) and to Robert Dudley, 1st Earl of Leicester, for support. Leicester with the Earl of Warwick had Wilcox released. Later Lady Anne Bacon was his patron.

His eldest daughter married the Puritan John Burges, as his second wife.
