= List of masters of Trinity College, Cambridge =

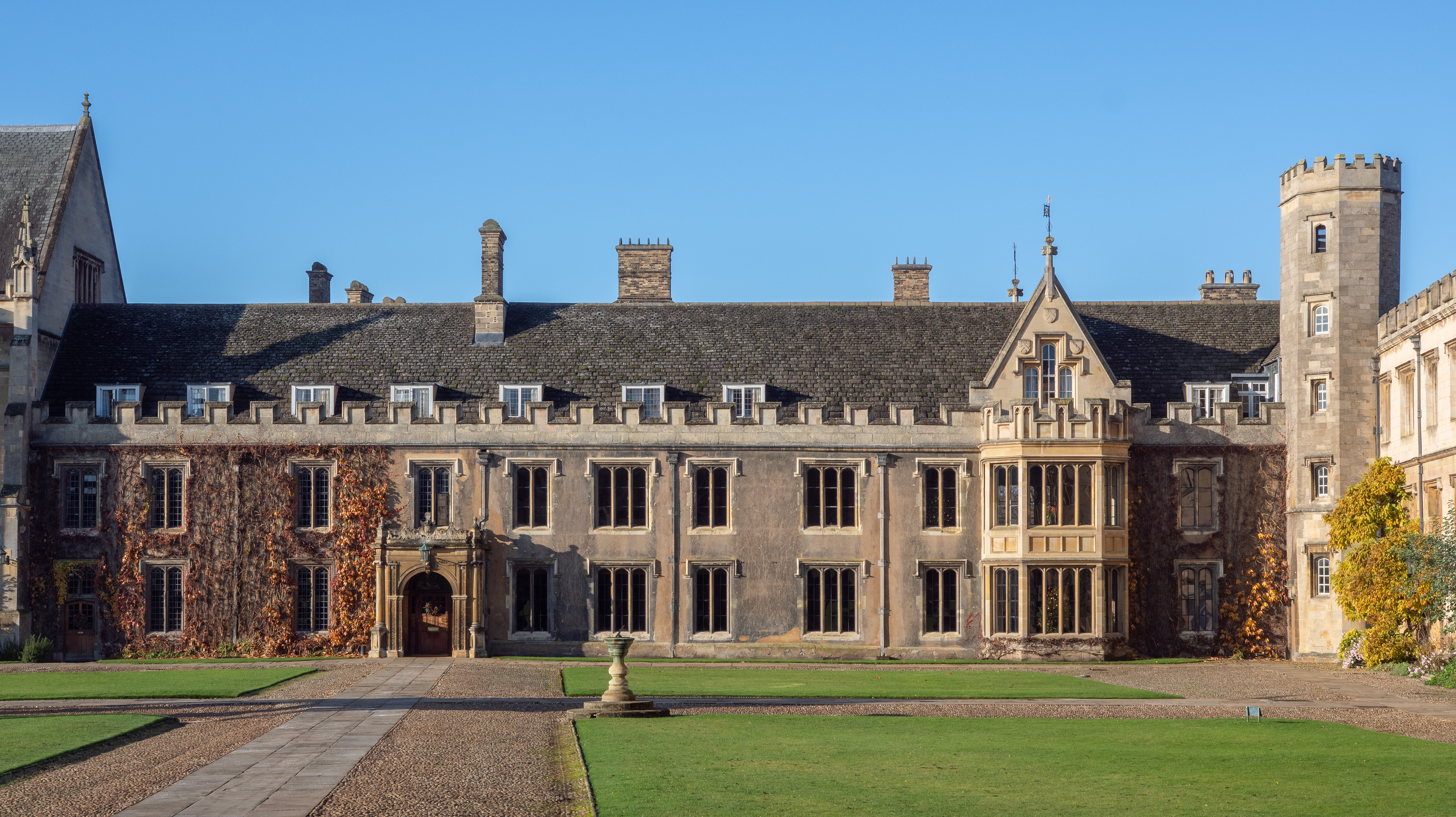
Master's lodge in Great Court, Trinity College

Trinity College, a constituent college of the University of Cambridge, is headed by a master who oversees the general operation of the college. The role is officially appointed by the monarch at the recommendation of the college, and involves presiding over meetings of the college council and its governing body, although the executive powers of the master are limited. In addition, the master supports relations with students and alumni of the college, and serves as an ambassador for its global development activities.

In 1546, Trinity College was founded by Henry VIII, merging the colleges of Michaelhouse and King's Hall. John Redman, then Warden of King's Hall, was thus appointed first Master of Trinity College. There have been 40 appointments to the position; William Bill was appointed master twice, in 1551 and 1558. The longest serving master was Richard Bentley, from 1700 until his death in 1741. He held the post despite widespread unpopularity amongst the fellows, a feud which lasted for about 30 years. During this, Bentley survived numerous criminal charges, and had his university degree rescinded between 1718 and 1724. The incoming master, Sir David Baulcombe, was appointed as the 40th Master of Trinity College on 15 June 2026, succeeding Dame Sally Davies.

For much of the past, the master was required to hold a degree from the University of Cambridge, and was usually a member of Trinity College. Historical statutes also stated that the office of the master could only be held up to the age of 70 or 75, at the decision of the fellows. Currently, the master holds office for a fixed term of up to eight years. There is no longer a requirement to have studied at Trinity College, or the University of Cambridge, but recent masters have usually been distinguished academics. The incumbent is always referred to as the master, regardless of gender, for historical reasons.

The Master of Trinity College resides in the Master's Lodge, located in Great Court. It was originally built in 1554, and is a Grade I listed building. The entrance hall has 16th-century panelling, and the drawing room has a late 15th-century plaster ceiling. The façade of the building towards Great Court was renovated between 1841 and 1843 by Anthony Salvin. In 1892, the architect Arthur Blomfield constructed the west wing of the lodge with additional rooms for private accommodation of the master, which freed some of the historic rooms for public use. The Master's Lodge is customarily the royal residence when visiting the university. It includes a state bedroom that was refurbished for the 1843 visit of Queen Victoria and Prince Albert.

Several masters of the college contributed to the development of its buildings throughout history. Thomas Nevile, master of the college from 1593, remodelled the majority of the college buildings. He demolished several buildings to clear space for the Great Court, which is now reputedly the largest enclosed courtyard in Europe. Upon his death, he bequeathed a sum of money that entirely paid for the construction of Nevile's Court. In the late 17th century, Nevile's Court was further developed by Christopher Wren under the instruction of the master of the college, Isaac Barrow, forming the Wren Library. In the 1860s, William Whewell paid for the construction of Whewell's Court, two neo-Gothic courts located on the opposite side of Trinity Street.

== List of masters ==
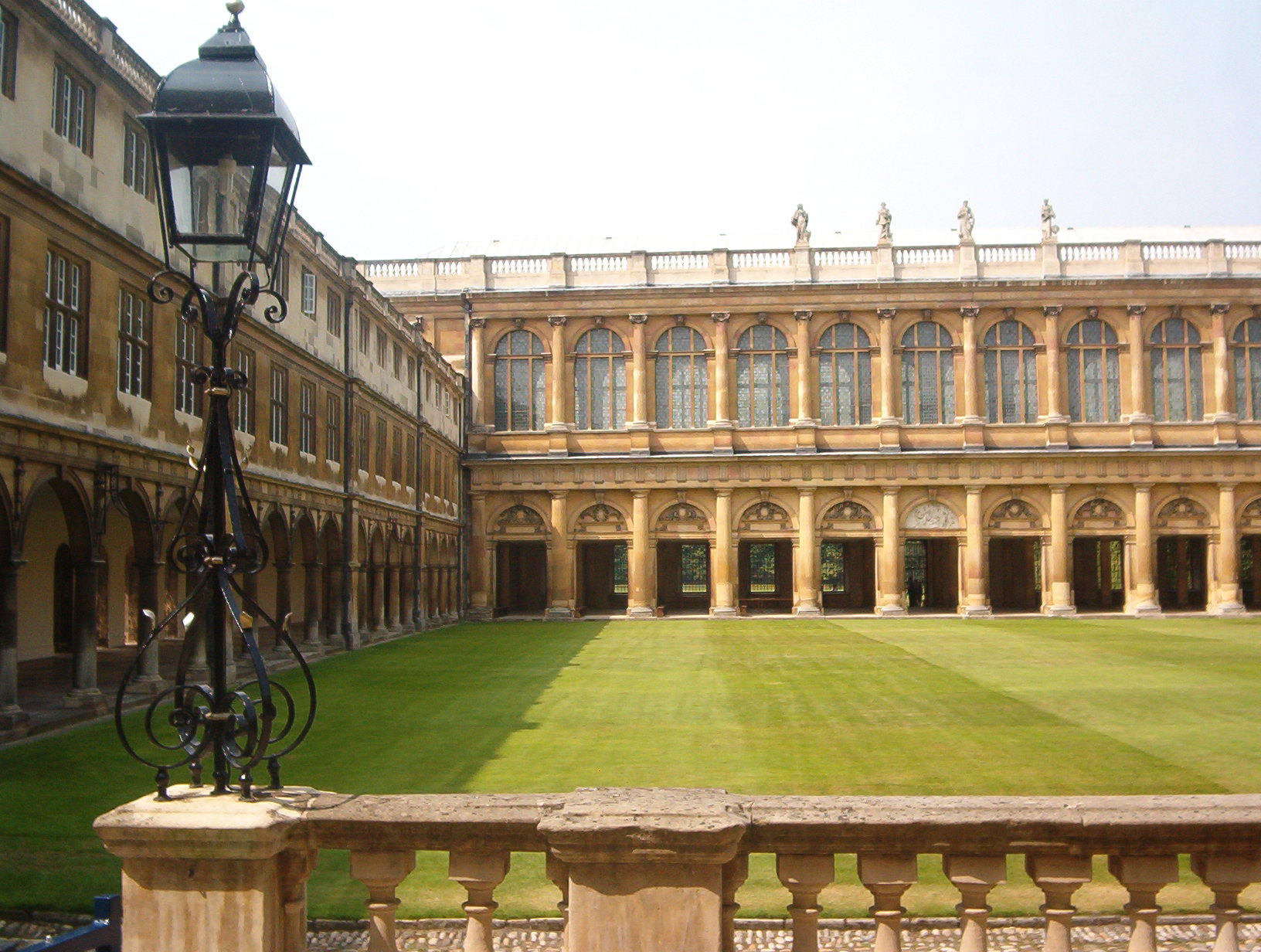
Nevile's Court, Trinity College

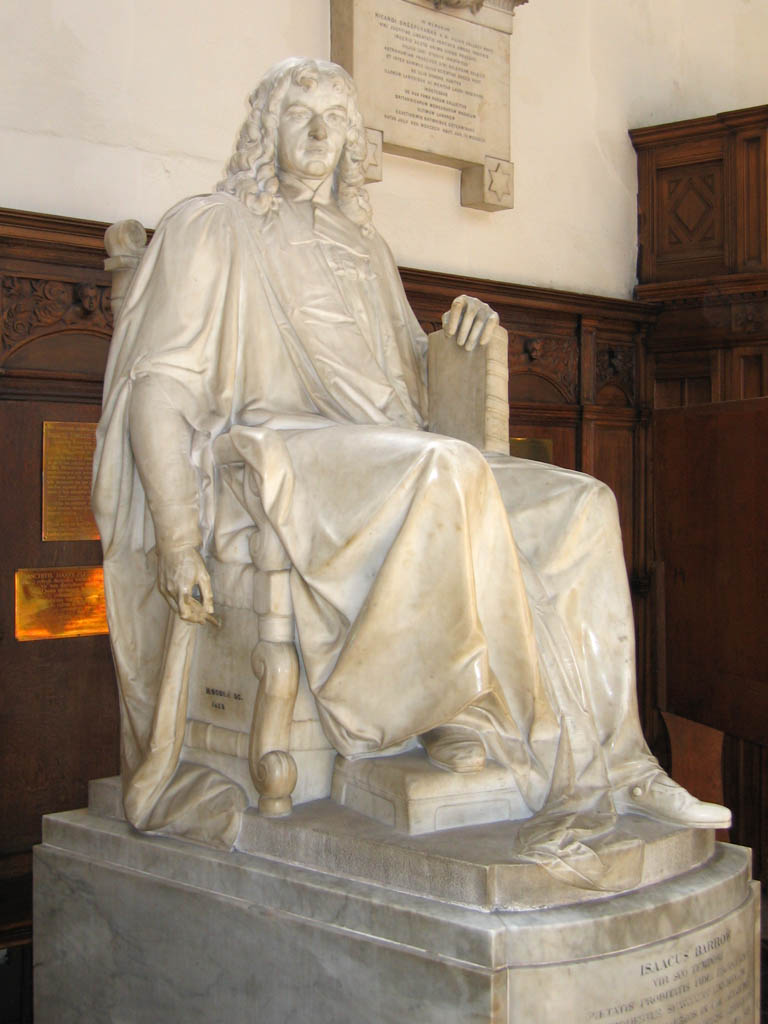
Statue of Isaac Barrow by Matthew Noble in Trinity College Chapel

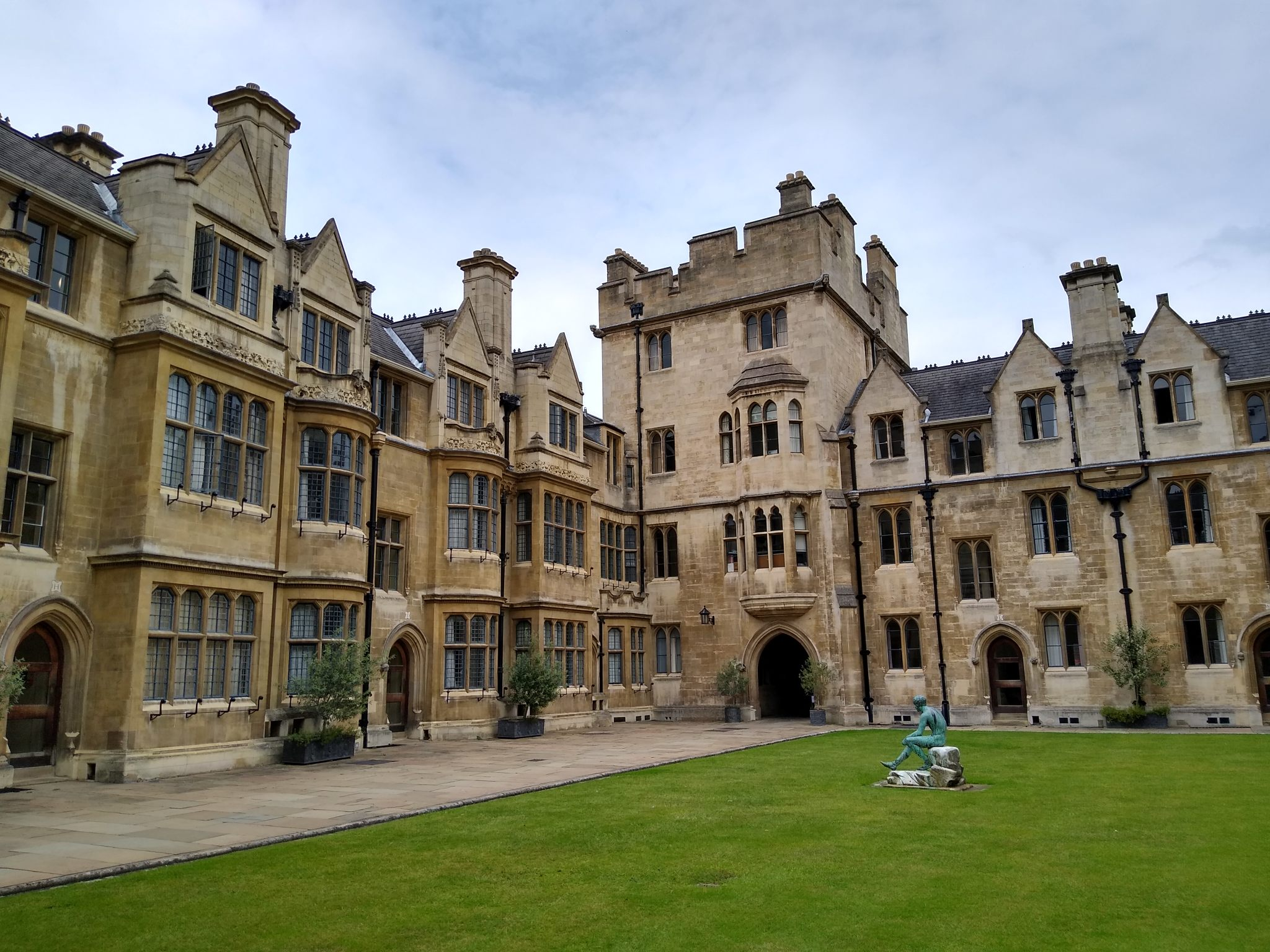
Whewell's Court, Trinity College

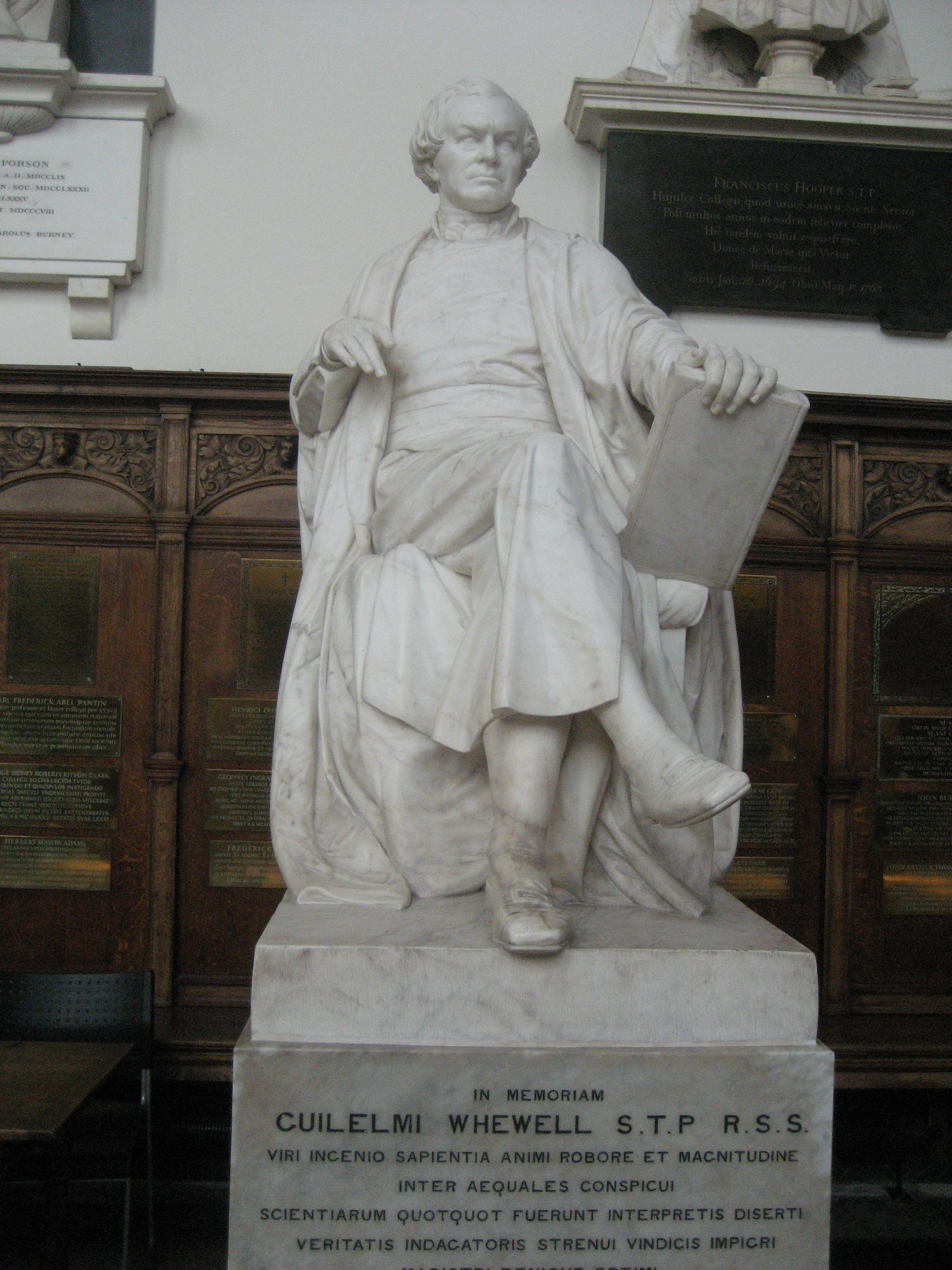
Statue of William Whewell by Thomas Woolner in the chapel

List of masters
Name	Portrait	Birth	Death	Term of office	Notes	Ref(s).
John Redman	—	1499	1551	1546–1551	Lady Margaret's Professor of Divinity (1538–1542), Public Orator of Cambridge (1537–1538), Warden of King's Hall (1542–1546), later forming Trinity College	
William Bill	Line engraving of William Bill	c. 1505	1561	1551–1553	Master of St John's College, Cambridge (1547–1551), Vice-Chancellor of Cambridge University (1548), Provost of Eton College (1558–1561), Dean of Westminster (1560–1561).	
John Christopherson	—	c. 1519	1558	1553–1558	Chaplain and confessor to Mary I, Dean of Norwich (1554–1557), Bishop of Chichester (1557–1558)	
William Bill	Line engraving of William Bill	c. 1505	1561	1558–1561	Second term as Master of Trinity College	
Robert Beaumont	—	c. 1525	1567	1561–1567	Lady Margaret's Professor of Divinity (1559–1561), Vice-Chancellor of Cambridge University (1564 and 1566)	
John Whitgift	Oil on canvas painting of John Whitgift	c. 1530	1604	1567–1577	Archbishop of Canterbury (1583–1604)	
John Still	Watercolour and Gouache painting of John Still	c. 1541	c. 1608	1577–1593	Master of St John's College, Cambridge (1574–1577), Vice-Chancellor of Cambridge University (1575 and 1592), Bishop of Bath and Wells (1593–1608)	
Thomas Nevile	Oil on panel painting of Thomas Nevile	c. 1548	1615	1593–1615	Dean of Peterborough (1591–1597) and Dean of Canterbury (1597–1615), Master of Magdalene College (1582–1593); significantly developed Trinity College, including expanding Great Court and building Nevile's Court	
John Richardson	Oil on panel painting of John Richardson	1564	1625	1615–1625	Biblical scholar, Regius Professor of Divinity (1607–1617), Master of Peterhouse, Cambridge (1609–1615), Vice-Chancellor of Cambridge University (1617)	
Leonard Mawe	—	1552	1629	1625–1629	Bishop of Bath and Wells (1628–1629), Master of Peterhouse (1617–1625)	
Samuel Brooke	—	1575	1631	1629–1631	Playwright, Gresham Professor of Divinity (1612–1629)	
Thomas Comber	Oil on canvas painting of Thomas Comber	1575	1653	1631–1645	Linguist, Dean of Carlisle (1629–1654)	
Thomas Hill	—	c. 1600	1653	1645–1653	Master of Emmanuel College, Cambridge (1644–1645), Vice-Chancellor of Cambridge University (1646)	
John Arrowsmith	—	1602	1659	1653–1659	Theologian, Master of St John's College, Cambridge (1644–1653), Vice-Chancellor of Cambridge University (1647), Regius Professor of Divinity (1651–1656)	
John Wilkins	Oil on canvas painting of John Wilkins	1614	1672	1659–1660	Natural philosopher, cofounder of the Royal Society, Warden of Wadham College, Oxford (1648–1659), Bishop of Chester (1668–1672)	
Henry Ferne	—	1602	1662	1660–1662	Dean of Ely (1661–1662), Bishop of Chester (1662)	
John Pearson	Engraving of John Pearson	1613	1686	1662–1672	Theologian, Master of Jesus College, Cambridge (1660–1662), Lady Margaret's Professor of Divinity (1661–1673), Bishop of Chester (1673–1686)	
Isaac Barrow	Oil on canvas painting of Isaac Barrow	1630	1677	1672–1677	Christian theologian and mathematician, known for early development of infinitesimal calculus; Regius Professor of Greek (1660–1663), first Lucasian Professor of Mathematics (1663–1669), academic advisor of Isaac Newton	
John North	—	1645	1683	1677–1683	Regius Professor of Greek (1672–1674), buried in Trinity College Chapel	
John Montagu	Oil on canvas painting of John Montagu	c. 1655	1728	1683–1699	Dean of Durham (1700–1728), benefactor to the college	
Richard Bentley	Engraving of Richard Bentley	1662	1742	1700–1742	Classical scholar, critic, theologian, Regius Professor of Divinity (1717–1742)	
Robert Smith	Oil on canvas painting of Robert Smith	1689	1768	1742–1768	Mathematician, Plumian Professor of Astronomy and Experimental Philosophy (1716–1760), buried in Trinity College Chapel	
John Hinchliffe	Oil on canvas painting of John Hinchliffe	1731	1794	1768–1789	Bishop of Peterborough (1769–1794), Dean of Durham (1788–1794)	
Thomas Postlethwaite	Oil on canvas painting of Thomas Postlethwaite	1731	1798	1789–1798	Vice-Chancellor of Cambridge University (1791)	
William Lort Mansel	Oil on canvas painting of William Lort Mansel	1753	1820	1798–1820	Public Orator of Cambridge (1788–1798), Vice-Chancellor of Cambridge University (1799), Bishop of Bristol (1808–1820)	
Christopher Wordsworth	Oil on canvas painting of Christopher Wordsworth	1774	1846	1820–1841	Vice-Chancellor of Cambridge University (1820 and 1826), youngest brother of the poet William Wordsworth	
William Whewell	Stipple engraving of William Whewell	1794	1866	1841–1866	Polymath, scientist, theologian, mathematician, poet; funded the construction of Whewell's Court	
William Hepworth Thompson	Oil on canvas painting of William Hepworth Thompson	1810	1886	1866–1886	Classical scholar, Regius Professor of Greek (1853–1867), reformer of Trinity College and the University of Cambridge	
Henry Montagu Butler	Oil on canvas painting of Henry Montagu Butler	1833	1918	1886–1918	Headmaster of Harrow School (1860–85), Dean of Gloucester (1885–86)	
J. J. Thomson	Photograph of J. J. Thomson	1856	1940	1918–1940	Physicist, laureate of the Nobel Prize in Physics (1906), known for the discovery of the electron	
G. M. Trevelyan		1876	1962	1940–1951	Historian and author, Regius Professor of History (1927–1943), Chancellor of Durham University (1950–1957)	
Edgar Adrian	Photograph of Edgar Adrian	1889	1977	1951–1965	Electrophysiologist, laureate of Nobel Prize for Physiology (1932) for work on the function of neurons, President of the Royal Society (1950–1955), President of the Royal Society of Medicine (1960–1962), Chancellor of the University of Cambridge (1967–1975)	
R.A. Butler	Photograph of Rab Butler	1902	1982	1965–1978	Conservative Party politician, Deputy Prime Minister (1962–1963)	
Alan Hodgkin	Photograph of Alan Hodgkin	1914	1998	1978–1984	Physiologist and biophysicist, joint winner of the Nobel Prize in Physiology or Medicine (1963), awarded Copley Medal (1965), later President of the Royal Society (1970–1975)	
Andrew Huxley	Photograph of Andrew Huxley	1917	2012	1984–1990	Physiologist and biophysicist, laureate of the Nobel Prize in Physiology or Medicine (1963), President of the Royal Society (1980–1985)	
Michael Atiyah	Photograph of Michael Atiyah	1929	2019	1990–1997	Mathematician, Savilian Professor of Geometry (1963–1969), laureate of the Fields Medal (1966) and Abel Prize (2004), President of the Royal Society (1990–1995)	
Amartya Sen	Photograph of Amartya Sen	1933		1998–2004	Economist and philosopher, laureate of the Nobel Memorial Prize in Economic Sciences (1998), recipient of the Bharat Ratna (1999)	
Martin Rees	Photograph of Martin Rees	1942		2004–2012	Cosmologist and astrophysicist, fifteenth Astronomer Royal (appointed 1995), President of the Royal Society (2005–2010)	
Gregory Winter	Photograph of Gregory Winter	1951		2012–2019	Molecular biologist, laureate of the Nobel Prize in Chemistry (2018), known for work on the therapeutic use of monoclonal antibodies	
Sally Davies	Photograph of Sally Davies	1949		2019–2026	Physician (haematologist), Chief Scientific Adviser at the Department of Health (2004–2016), Chief Medical Officer (2010–2019)	
David Baulcombe		1952		2026-present	Plant scientist and geneticist, Regius Professor of Botany (2009-2020), Biological Secretary and Vice President of the Royal Society (2024-present)	
