= Henry Hornby =

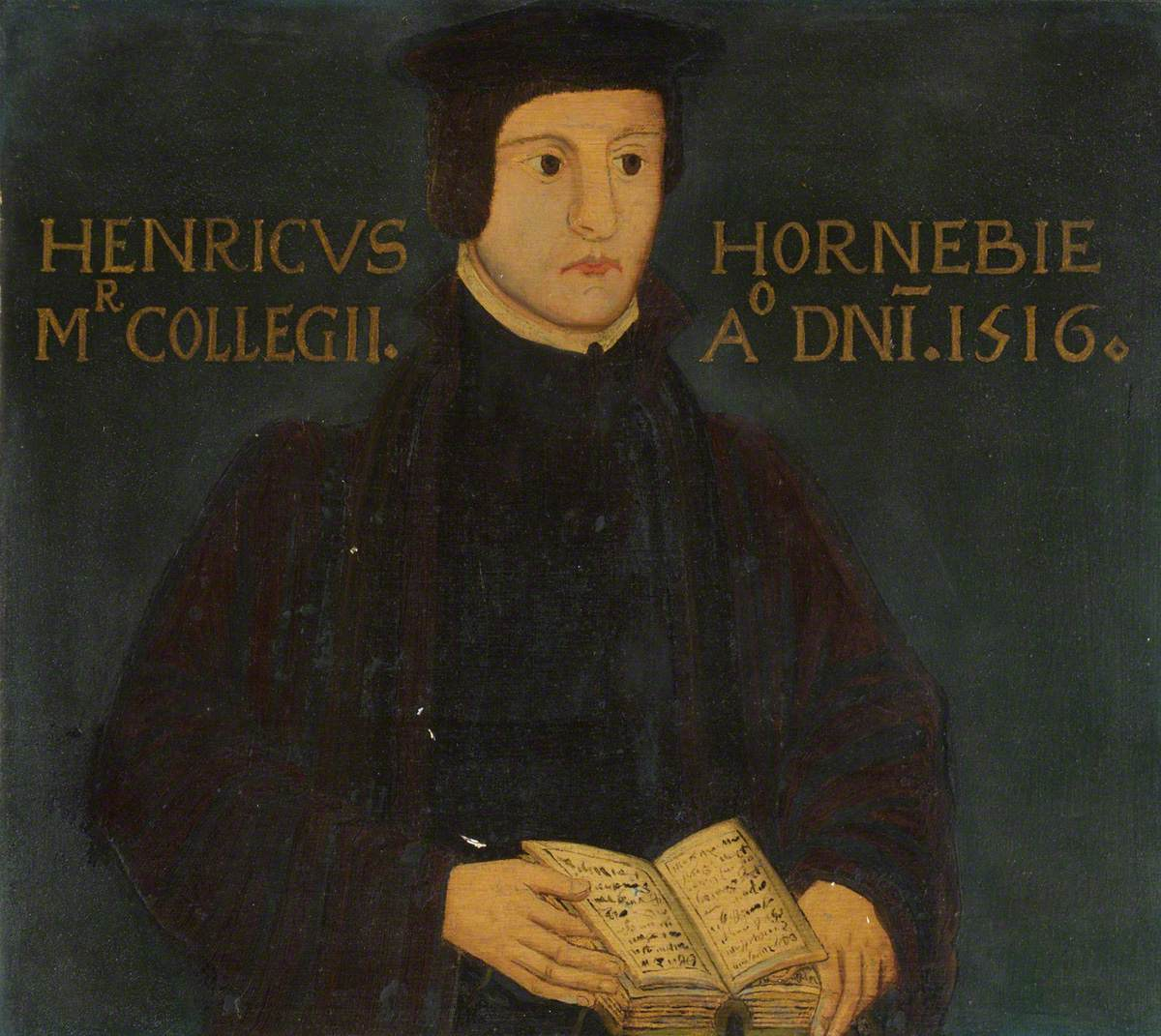
Henry Hornby

Henry Hornby (or Horneby or Hornebie; died 12 February 1518) was an English priest, academic, and royal official.

Hornby was the son of George Hornby of Deeping, Lincolnshire, keeper of the horses on the estate of Lady Margaret Beaufort (mother of the future King Henry VII). Hornby's family had been in service to Lady Margaret's mother, Margaret Beauchamp, dowager Duchess of Somerset.

At Cambridge, Hornby graduated B.D. in 1489/90, D.D. in 1495, and became a Fellow of Clare College and later Michaelhouse.

Among many positions that he acquired in the church, Hornby was Dean of St Chad's, Shrewsbury and Wimborne Minster, and held prebendaries at Southwell Minster and Lincoln Cathedral.

By 1499, Hornby was serving as Lady Margaret's secretary and dean of chapel. In 1501 he succeeded Thomas Denman (Lady Margaret's physician) as Master of Peterhouse, Cambridge. From 1504 he was additionally Lady Margaret's chancellor.

With John Fisher (Bishop of Rochester, Vice-Chancellor of Cambridge University, and Lady Margaret's chaplain), Hornby oversaw Lady Margaret's benefactions to Cambridge. Fisher and Hornby were executors of Lady Margaret's will (she died in 1509), arranging the foundation of St John's College, Cambridge using her estate.

Hornby was at the centre of a set of humanist scholars. Several of Hornby's Fellows at Peterhouse reached high places in the university, and were closely involved in Lady Margaret's benefactions at Cambridge. William Burgoyne was appointed Lady Margaret's Professor of Divinity; John Watson, a friend of Erasmus, became a Lady Margaret preacher and Master of Christ's College (refounded by Lady Margaret); Robert Shorton was closely involved with Hornby and Fisher in the foundation of St John's College, becoming its first Master.

Hornby died on 12 February 1518, and was buried at Little St Mary's, Cambridge. He was succeeded as Master of Peterhouse by William Burgoyne.
