= John Seton (priest) =

John Seton D.D. (c. 1498 - July 20, 1567) was an English Roman Catholic priest, known as the author of a standard logic text.

== Life ==
Born in or about 1498, Seton was educated at St John's College, Cambridge, where he graduated B.A. in 1528. Soon afterwards he was elected a fellow of St. John's, and graduated M.A. in 1532, B.D. in 1541.

Seton taught philosophy in his college, and gained a reputation as a tutor. He belonged to the "conservative humanist" group associated to St John's, a college sharply divided by the Protestant Reformation, with others of similar views including John Christopherson and Thomas Watson. He was also a good friend, however, of Roger Ascham who was one of the reformers there.

After being ordained priest, Seton became one of Bishop John Fisher's chaplains, and attended him the Tower of London. In 1542 he was one of the fellows of St John's who signed an appeal to the Visitor against John Taylor, the Master. In 1544 he proceeded D.D., and about that time was appointed one of the chaplains to Stephen Gardiner, at that time bishop of Winchester and chancellor of the university, who collated him to the rectory of Hinton, Hampshire; at Gardiner's trial in 1551 Seton gave testimony in his favour.

Seton was present at the disputation with Peter Martyr held at Oxford in 1550. In 1553 he was installed canon of Winchester Cathedral, and in the following year prebendary of Ulskelf in the York Minster. He was one of the doctors of divinity who, by the direction of Bishop Gardiner, went to Oxford for the disputation with Thomas Cranmer, Nicholas Ridley, and Hugh Latimer, concerning matters of religion, and on this occasion he was incorporated D.D. there on 14 April 1554.

In 1555 Seton visited the Protestant John Bradford in prison, for the purpose of inducing him to recant; in 1558 he attended Thomas Benbridge on the same mission. Seton's name was on a list of Catholic clergy drawn up in 1561, described as learned but settled in papistry, and as having been ordered to remain within the City of London, or with twenty miles of it.

After suffering imprisonment, Seton left England and went to Rome, where he died on 20 July 1567. He is buried on the wall of the college chapel of the Venerable English College, Rome, close to the altar together with his long time friend Nicholas Morton (died after 1586).

== Works ==
Seton wrote:

- Panegyrici in victoriam illustrissimæ D. Mariæ Angliæ, Franciæ, & Hiberniæ Reginæ, &c. Item in Coronationem ejusdem Sereniss. Reginæ Congratulatio. Ad hæc de Sacrosancta Eucharistia Carmen D. Joanne Setono authore, London, 1553; dedicated to Queen Mary.
- Latin verses before Dr. Alban Langdale's Catholica Confutatio Nic. Ridlei, Paris, 1556.
- Dialectica brevem in contextum constricta,..., London, 1563. Seton's lectures before his death and before Carter's notes were added.
- Dialectica; annotationibus Petri Carteri, ut clarissimis, ita brevissimis, explicata. Huic accessit, ob artium ingenuarum inter se cognationem, Gulielmi Buclæi arithmetica, London, 1572, reissued 1574, 1577, 1584, 1599; Cambridge, 1631; dedicated to Bishop Gardiner, with notes by Peter Carter. This work was circulated in manuscript among students before it appeared in print, and for nearly a century was recognised as a standard treatise on logic. It was heavily influenced by the De inventione dialecticae of Rudolphus Agricola. In contrast to typical rhetoric treatises that emphasised inventio, it placed weight on the organisation of arguments. Roger Ascham is considered to have been influenced by Seton in exactly this area.

== Notes ==
Attribution

This article incorporates text from a publication now in the public domain: Lee, Sidney, ed. (1897). "Seton, John (1498?-1567)". Dictionary of National Biography. Vol. 51. London: Smith, Elder & Co.
