= Thomas Watson (bishop of Lincoln) =

Catholic Bishop of Lincoln, 1515–1584

The Right Reverend Thomas Watson
- Bishop of Lincoln
- Church: Roman Catholic
- Diocese: Lincoln
- Appointed: 24 March 1557
- Term ended: 25 June 1559
- Predecessor: John White
- Successor: Nicholas Bullingham

Orders
- Consecration: 15 August 1557 by Nicholas Heath

Personal details
- Born: 1515 Durham, England
- Died: 27 September 1584 (aged c. 69)

Thomas Watson (1515 – 27 September 1584) was a Catholic Bishop, notable among Catholics for his descriptions of the Protestant Reformation. Historian Albert Pollard described Watson as "one of the chief Catholic controversialists" of Mary Tudor's reign.

== Early life ==
Watson was born near Durham in 1515. He grew up in a monastic world at Nun Stainton, near Durham. Little is known about his earliest schooling, but for entrance into Cambridge University, he would have studied at Durham's Priory School. The Rites of Durham, written in about 1593, recalls life in Durham Cathedral before the Dissolution. Watson describes the school, and the last schoolmaster, Robert Hartburne, as a venerable and learned monk, always looking for a bright pupil who was "apt to learning, and did apply his book, and had a pregnant wit with all" to groom for university entrance.

He left for St John's College, Cambridge in 1529. The majority of staff and students of the university, under their Chancellor, John Fisher, were clerics or future clerics. Watson received his B.A. in 1532/3 and his M.A. in 1536.

== Absalom ==
In response to his oath of allegiance to Henry VIII, Watson wrote an unpublished five-act play. The play, written in Latin verse and completed at around 1540, was based on Absalom's revolt against his father David described in the Old Testament. The manuscript was hidden and lost until it was rediscovered among 16th century humanist manuscripts in the British Museum in 1963.

Absalom was written "in trew imitation" of a classical tragedy, but with a contemporary twist. In language and style it imitates Aristotle, Horace or Seneca, and yet in content the biblical story merges with events taking place all around. The story begins with a prince quarrelling with his father. The issue concerns his brother and their relationship with a princess. Absalom demands a particular ruling from his father, but David cannot comply. Absalom decides to act in defiance of his father, and David censures him. Absalom flies into a rage, and furiously begins to undermine and then deny his father's authority.

Absalom's subjects are dismayed, but forced to take sides. Innocent people are involved. Absalom resorts to decrees, threats, intimidation and executions. Although he has qualms of conscience, he overcomes them as opposition melts before his onslaught. With no father to restrain him, he can now do whatever he wishes.

The chorus in Absalom identifies David as God's elect, "Son of Jesse", and anointed ruler of Israel. He unites diverse tribes into one people. He is their focus of unity with undisputed authority. He is holy and pious with a prayer always on his lips. He wants to help Absalom, but he cannot. He is full of love for his prodigal son. The chorus is not uncritical of David's weaknesses, but reveres his divine office as "Holy Father" of God's people.

Similarly, the chorus sees Absalom as David's once-devoted son. He had always honoured and obeyed his father according to the divine precepts. But now, if his every whim is not granted, he flies into a rage. Even his ministers go in fear, giving in to him in all things. But, warns the chorus, his unbridled pride will be his downfall.

In Absalom, David presides over Old Jerusalem as the pope presides over New Jerusalem. The beloved son rebels against his father, launches his attack, overthrows him, and usurps his place. David refuses to retaliate, allowing time for Absalom to return to his senses and seek reconciliation. But Absalom sees his father's hesitation not as love, but as weakness.

In Watson's play, Absalom sacks David's temples in the territories he controls. He expels their guardians, loots their possessions, and destroys their altars. There is no mention of temples in the Old Testament story, but what Watson describes parallels the dissolution and plundering of the monasteries, guilds, shrines and chantry chapels. Absalom is destroying David's last footholds, filling his treasury, funding his rebellion, and securing his own position. He vows that there will be no reconciliation.

By Act IV those closest to Absalom are dismayed by his ferocity. He turns on them too, as Henry turned on Wolsey, Fisher, More, and Cromwell. But opposition appears on two fronts. The disenchanted are converting back to David and joining those who had gone into hiding. And allies of David abroad are raising an army. No longer knowing whom he can trust, Absalom ruthlessly hunts down those loyal to David.

While the first four acts of Absalom looked at parallels in what had happened so far, the fifth looked to parallels in the future. Presumably, what happened to Absalom would happen to Henry. There would be a final battle. As victory went to David, it would inevitably go to the pope. As David resumed his appointed role over God's people, so would the pope. As Absalom's revolt amounted to nothing, nor would Henry's! Watson's message, then, is one of patience and total confidence in the ultimate victory of the pope.

== Academic career ==
Watson took his master's degree in 1537 and became a lecturer, then Dean of his college. However, with Thomas Cromwell as Chancellor after 1535, and Stephen Gardiner after 1540, the hunting and purging of undercover papists continued. Nicholas Metcalf, Master of St. John's since 1518, was forced to resign in 1537. The next Master, George Day, was also denounced as a papist in 1538. Cromwell then had one of his own men, John Taylor, "elected by force." He was the first avowed anti-papist "reformer" to become Master of St. John's College.

When Taylor introduced a stiff vetting process for students and staff, Watson was one of twenty fellows to protest, but to no avail. When Cromwell was arraigned and executed for heresy in 1540, Taylor was also arrested. He was held for a while, but promised to conform to Henry's Six Articles. Heresy charges were dropped, and he resumed his office as Master. But Lutheranism was on the increase. After Watson took his divinity degree in 1543, he began to emerge as one of the college's foremost champions and preachers of the Old Faith.

By 1545, with mounting hostility from Taylor and others, Watson consulted the Chancellor, Stephen Gardiner. Gardiner, like Henry, was dismayed that anti-papal sentiment was becoming anti-Catholic as well. While he had supported the king's efforts to overthrow papal authority in favour of royal supremacy, he was now alarmed at where this might lead. Gardiner saw in Watson a kindred spirit and invited him to be his domestic chaplain – one of his personal aides. So in 1545 Watson joined the familia of the Bishop of Winchester; he was no longer subject to Taylor, and now had the Chancellor's authority and support for his preaching. In 1546 Taylor was forced to resign as Master of St John's. Under Edward VI he would follow Henry Holbeach as the second (married) Protestant Bishop of Lincoln.

Watson worked side by side with Gardiner during Henry's last two years, trying to keep the Church in England Catholic. In the process he became widely known as a powerful advocate for the Old Faith. In spite of this, during the last months of his reign, Henry ordered the execution of three papists for questioning his royal supremacy, and the burning of three Lutherans for questioning his Catholic doctrine.

== Arrest under Edward's rule ==
All was well while Henry lived and Gardiner held his own against Cranmer. But when Henry died, nine-year-old Edward came to the throne, and Lord Protector Edward Seymour, 1st Duke of Somerset became in effect the first Lutheran "Head" of the English Church. When Gardiner opposed Somerset's changes he was arrested. Watson continued preaching, but not for long. Two of Somerset's agents, Tonge and Ayre, appointed as canons of Winchester in defiance of Gardiner, denounced Watson for hampering the cause of reform. Watson was arrested and committed to the Fleet Prison.

In 1548 an amnesty was proclaimed and Gardiner and Watson were released. Gardiner was confined to house arrest in London and Watson stayed with him. In December they were allowed to return to Winchester. In their absence, images had been removed from churches, the liturgy changed, processions forbidden, and Protestant preachers introduced. Henry VIII's Six Articles had been repealed, more changes were rumoured, and people were confused. Gardiner again protested. He and Watson were summoned back to London where Gardiner was recommitted to the Tower. Before he could be brought to trial the Lutheran Somerset had fallen, and the next effectual "Head" of the Church was a Zwinglian, Protector Northumberland.

In 1551 Watson was called to give evidence for the prosecution and defence, and Gardiner was confirmed guilty. He was returned to the Tower where he stayed throughout Edward's reign. Watson was forbidden to preach. In December 1551 he was back in London to be examined on his belief in the doctrine of transubstantiation. His examiners included no less than William Cecil, John Cheke, Robert Horne, and Edmund Grindal. His friends John Feckenham and John Young had also been summoned, and the examination took the form of a debate. The three were given assurances of immunity from prosecution, but were wary. Strype accused Watson of equivocation. Grindal was furious with the outcome. At this time Watson was probably working with Gardiner on his case against Cranmer entitled Confutatio Cavillationum, printed in Paris in 1552. This was later used against Cranmer at his trial.

== Under Mary's reign ==
When Mary I came to the throne in August 1553, she immediately released Gardiner and restored him to his offices as Bishop of Winchester and Chancellor of Cambridge University. On Gardiner's advice she chose Watson to formally announce her intention to restore England to the Catholic Faith. On 20 August 1553, a great gathering was called at St Paul's Cross In the presence of the Queen, members of the court, bishops, dignitaries, nobility, the Lord Mayor and aldermen of London, representatives of the crafts and trades, and with a military guard, Thomas Watson stood to preach. It was more of a manifesto than a sermon. He referred to the confusion lately spread by Protestant preachers to whom people should no longer listen. He asked them not to seek new doctrines or a new faith, nor to build a new church or new temple. He exhorted them rather to return to the old faith, the faith of their fathers, and to help their Queen to restore the old temple. His sermon made a great impression, preparing the way for what was to come.

Gardiner then sent Watson back to Cambridge with full authority to restore the university's former statutes and traditions. He was welcomed back and elected Master of his old College, St. John's on 28 September 1553. He confronted those Protestant members of the Convocation who had expelled and excluded Catholics and turned the tables on them. He reinstated the statutes of John Fisher, and committed the university to restoring and observing former Catholic traditions, customs and liturgies.

Durham Cathedral was in a state of chaos, and on 18 November he was elected its third Dean. Prior Hugh Whitehead, elected first Dean in 1540, had kept Durham Catholic under Henry VIII. At Edward's accession he had been called to London and ordered to introduce the reformed religion, but he collapsed and died and was buried near the Tower of London. Somerset then sent two "commissioners" to Durham. The author of the Rites names them as Dr. Harvy, Dr. Whitby and Dr. Horne and describes their mission "to deface all popish ornaments", not only in the cathedral, but in surrounding churches. Robert Horne, Watson's old adversary, had been appointed Dean in 1551. Now in 1553 Watson was sent to replace him, and Horne retired abroad.

In April 1554 he went to Oxford to dispute or reason with Cranmer, Ridley and Latimer, now charged with heresy. He was asked to examine other "heretics", including Bishop Hooper and John Rogers, but was also in great demand for preaching. He was even summoned to preach before the Queen, which he did on 17 March and 14 April in "Two Notable Sermons." The first was "Concerning the Real Presence of Christ's Body and Blood in the Blessed Sacrament" and the second "The Mass which is the Sacrifice of the New Testament". He argued that the early fathers, the great doctors, and the councils of the Church witnessed to the truth of Catholic Eucharistic teaching. He argued that the three bedrocks of the Church had always been the scriptures, unbroken tradition, and the apostolic magisterium. Scripture alone was not enough, as sectarianism and fragmentation of religious belief after Luther had demonstrated.

== "Absalom" come true ==
Watson was passionate as well about restoring the sacraments to those who had lost them. His engagements included several public orations like that at St. Mary's Spital at the end of April. Mary was eager to relinquish her parliamentary title of "Supreme Head on Earth of the Church of England" and seek reconciliation with Rome. Cardinal Pole, as Papal Legate, formally welcomed England back into the Catholic Fold on St. Andrew's Day, 30 November 1554. Watson's hopes and dreams, so poetically expressed in Absalom, had finally come about.

Bishop Gardiner, now convinced of the fatal flaw in royal supremacy, died reconciled to Rome in November 1555. John White, who had followed Taylor as Bishop of Lincoln, was translated to Winchester in 1556, and Thomas Watson, pending ratification by the pope, was elected the thirty-fourth Bishop of Lincoln. In January 1557, as bishop-elect, he was sent by Cardinal Pole to "re-visit" Cambridge University and ensure that all was proceeding well. He re-emphasised the importance of traditional doctrine, traditional symbolism and traditional liturgy. The following month, February 1557, he officiated at the exhumation and burning of the remains of Martin Bucer and Paul Fagius. At the ceremony he preached for two hours on the harm they had done to the English Church by their "wykedness and heretycall doctryn."

Watson's papal bull of appointment (the last ever for a Bishop of Lincoln) was issued on 24 March 1557. However, he still had business in Durham. On 29 May, Cardinal Pole gave him permission to remain Dean of Durham for as long as necessary. His main task was the restoration of Catholic doctrine, customs and liturgy, included efforts to recover valuables, property and land plundered during the two previous reigns. But he also undertook some duties in the Diocese of Lincoln as Bishop-Elect.

== Consecrated Bishop of Lincoln ==
Watson was consecrated Bishop of Lincoln on the Feast of the Assumption of the Blessed Virgin Mary on 15 August 1557, by the Archbishop of York in London. Arriving in Lincoln for his installation in October, he was met with pomp and ceremony at the cathedral's Great West Doors by his clergy. The bells rang out and the choirs sang as he was conducted to his Episcopal seat. He was dismayed at the impoverishment of the diocese and set himself to recovering what he could, including several manors, estates and benefices seized by Henry and Edward. He also retrieved "many rich vestments, articles of plate and other furniture of which the Church of Lincoln had been despoiled."

Watson spent much of his time as Bishop of Lincoln travelling the diocese or in London. He was asked to preach at St. Paul's Cross in February 1558 before another assembly of dignitaries, including the Lord Mayor and aldermen of London, ten bishops, and a huge crowd of people. In constant demand, he was now one of the hierarchy's most celebrated spokesmen. At the request of Cardinal Pole and Convocation he prepared thirty of his sermons for publication. Entitled Holsome and Catholyke Doctryne concerninge the Seven Sacramentes of Chrystes Church, expedient to be knowen of all men, set forth in maner of Shorte Sermons to bee made to the People, his book was printed in London in 1558. Watson gained a reputation for leniency in dealing with Protestants. During his time as Bishop of Lincoln, the most severe period of Mary's campaign against "heretics", there was not a single execution in the whole Diocese.

== Arrest under Elizabeth's rule ==
Mary and Pole died within hours of each other on 17 November 1558. Elizabeth and Cecil lost no time in consulting with Protestant dissidents. In March 1559, the bishops were summoned to the Westminster Conference to dispute with them over the future of the English Church. When it became obvious that the outcome was already determined, the bishops could not proceed. It was then alleged that White and Watson had urged them to consider the Queen's excommunication. The two bishops were arrested and sent to the Tower on 3 April 1559.

By early May fresh Acts of Supremacy and Uniformity had been passed, and the Protestant Book of Common Prayer reintroduced. The bishops were once more cut off from Rome, stripped of their authority and "extinguished" as a hierarchy. On 25 June Watson was tried, found guilty, deprived of his bishopric, and given a life sentence. One by one Elizabeth replaced the Catholic bishops with Protestants.

== Confinement ==
After a time in the Tower of London, Watson was placed in the custody of his old adversaries: Grindal, now Bishop of London; Guest, now Bishop of Rochester; and Richard Cox, now Bishop of Ely. Ten years later, in 1570 the pope finally excommunicated Elizabeth. Watson was returned to the Tower. When interrogated about the excommunication, his only regret was that it might create greater hardship for Catholics. He was kept in the Tower until the following year, and then returned to his former places of confinement. He was transferred from the custody of the Bishop of Rochester to that of the Bishop of Ely in 1580, and committed to imprisonment in Wisbech Castle.

The Bishop of Ely had been ordered to turn his palace Wisbech Castle into an internment centre for Catholics, and for the first time in years Watson had friends around him. These included his old friend John Feckenham, a fellow student of his at Cambridge and the last Abbot of Westminster. Along with former Marian priests there were newly arrived seminary priests and Jesuits. Watson's contacts now widened, and he appears to have exercised some sort of episcopal ministry "in vinculis".

== Death ==
In March 1581 he was accused of corresponding with Catholics in Portugal, but his health and eyesight were deteriorating. He died almost blind at the age of sixty-nine. He had been confined for twenty-five years, ending his days in Wisbech Castle on 15 October 1584, and was buried in the parish church of Wisbech.

His epitaph is given in the Athenae Cantabrigiensis (1858):

Thomas Watson, sometime Master of St John's College Cambridge,
Dean of Durham and Bishop of Lincoln:

"Orator Facundas, Bonus Poeta,
Solidus Theologus et Concionator Celebris."

"An eloquent speaker, a gifted poet,
a sound theologian and a celebrated preacher."

== Sources ==
- Cooper, Charles Henry; Thompson Cooper (1858–1861). Athenae Cantabrigiensis (3 vols). Cambridge.
- Fowler, J. T., ed. (1902). Rites of Durham being a description or brief declaration of all the ancient monuments, rites, and customs belonging or being within the monastical Church of Durham before the Suppression. Written 1593. Surtees Society. ISBN 0-85444-013-5.

Church of England titles
Preceded by John White	Bishop of Lincoln; 1557–1559	Succeeded by Nicholas Bullingham
Academic offices
Preceded by Thomas Lever	Master of St John's College, Cambridge; 1553–1554	Succeeded by George Bullock
