= Judith Lieu =

British theologian

Judith Lieu FBA
- Born: 25 May 1951 (age 75)
- Spouse: Samuel N. C. Lieu

Academic background
- Education: Durham University; University of Birmingham

Academic work
- Discipline: Theology; history
- Institutions: Queen's College, Birmingham; King's College, London; Robinson College, Cambridge

Judith Margaret Lieu FBA (born 1951) is a British theologian and historian of religion. She specialises in the New Testament and early Christianity. Her research includes a focus on early Christian identity in its historical context, and literary analysis of biblical texts. From 2010 to 2018, she was Lady Margaret's Professor of Divinity at the University of Cambridge. She retired from her post in 2018.

== Early life and education ==
Lieu was born on 25 May 1951. She studied theology at Durham University, graduating with a Bachelor of Arts (BA) degree in 1972. She remained at Durham to undertake postgraduate studies in theology, and graduated with a Master of Arts (MA) degree in 1973. She then moved to the University of Oxford where she trained to be a school teacher, completed her Postgraduate Certificate in Education (PGCE) in 1974. She undertook postgraduate research at the University of Birmingham, and completed her Doctor of Philosophy (PhD) degree in 1980.

In 1976, she married Samuel N. C. Lieu, a historian of Manichaeism and Christianity in Central Asia and China.

== Academic career ==
Lieu began her academic teaching career at the Queen's College, Birmingham, an ecumenical theological college. In January 2001, she moved to King's College London, having been appointed as Professor of New Testament Studies.

Lieu is a fellow of Robinson College, Cambridge.

Lieu has edited Studia Patristica, a peer-reviewed book series on patristics. She was President of the Studiorum Novi Testamenti Societas (SNTS) for 2015/2016.

== Honours ==
- In 2014, Lieu was elected a Fellow of the British Academy (FBA), the United Kingdom's national academy for the humanities and social sciences.
- She was elected to American Academy of Arts and Sciences - International Honorary Member (2019).

Academic offices
| Preceded by Graham Stanton | Lady Margaret's Professor of Divinity; 2010–2018 | Succeeded by George van Kooten |
Professional and academic associations
| Preceded by Udo Schnelle | President of the Studiorum; Novi Testamenti Societas; 2015 | Succeeded by Carl Holladay |
