= John Sanderson (priest) =

John Sanderson (died 1602) was an English Roman Catholic priest, known as a writer on logic.

== Life ==
A native of Lancashire, he matriculated as a sizar of Trinity College, Cambridge, in May 1554, became a scholar there, and in 1558 proceeded to the degree of B.A. He was subsequently elected a fellow, and in 1561 he graduated M.A. It is probable that he was related, perhaps as an older brother, to Lawrence Sanderson from Furness Abbey, Lancashire, who matriculated as a sizar of the same college in 1560 and was ordained deacon at London in May 1567 at the age of 24.

In 1562 John Sanderson was logic reader of the university. His commonplaces in Trinity College Chapel on 2 and 4 September of that year gave offence to the master, Robert Beaumont, and the seniors. He was charged with superstitious doctrine as respects fasting and the observance of particular days; and with having used allegory and cited Plato and other profane authors when discoursing on the scriptures. He was expelled from his fellowship for "suspicious doctrine", and his attitude refusing to make a written recantation in a prescribed form, though he made some kind of revocation. Among the reasons for his expulsion was his insulting the Master. He appealed to the vice-chancellor, but the visitors of the university, or the commissioners for causes ecclesiastical, interposed, and he was not restored to his fellowship. Alexander Nowell wrote to Archbishop Matthew Parker stating that the affair was a struggle over the religious conformity of the University of Cambridge as whole.

Soon afterwards Sanderson went to Rome, and then to France, finally moving Flanders because of French civil warfare. In 1570 he was enrolled at the English College, Douay. There he formed a close friendship with John Pits. He was ordained priest, and took the degree of D.D. in the University of Douay. On 2 April 1580 he arrived at Reims, in company with William Allen. He became divinity professor in the English College there, and was appointed a canon of Cambrai Cathedral church. About 1591 he was at Mons.

Sanderson died at Cambrai on 18 August 1602; his remains were found under the site of the nave of Cambrai Cathedral in October 1822.

== Works ==
Sanderson's major work was Institutionum Dialecticarum libri quatuor, Antwerp, 1589; also Oxford, 1594, 1602, 1609, dedicated to Cardinal Allen. The grant of the exclusive privilege of printing the work is dated 11 August 1583. Arnold Hatfield, a stationer of London, obtained in 1589 a license to reprint this book. This was a logic textbook that was popular in England, with the books of John Seton and Thomas Wilson forming a collection of introductory compendia on the subject.

The main points of Sanderson's commonplaces delivered in Trinity College Chapel are extant in manuscript (Parker MS. 106, p. 537). An account of his expulsion from Trinity College, including his Latin verses to Archbishop Parker (Parker MS. in Corpus Christi College Library, No. 106, p. 543), was published in Ralph Churton's Life of Alexander Nowell.

Other writings included Tabulae Vel Schema Catechisticum De Tota Theologica Morali, Lib. i (of which no copy seems to be extant) and De Omnibus S. Scripturae Locis Inter Pontificios Et Haereticos Controversis (incomplete manuscript).
