= John White (bishop) =

English bishop

The Right Reverend John White
- Bishop of Winchester
- Church: Roman Catholic
- Appointed: 6 July 1556
- Term ended: 1559
- Predecessor: Stephen Gardiner
- Successor: Robert Horne
- Previous post: Bishop of Lincoln (1554–1556)

Orders
- Consecration: 1 April 1554 by Edmund Bonner

Personal details
- Born: 1510 Farnham, Hampshire, England
- Died: 1560 (aged 49–50)

John White (1510 – 12 January 1560) was a Headmaster and Warden of Winchester College during the English Reformation who, remaining staunchly Roman Catholic in duty to his mentor Stephen Gardiner, became Bishop of Lincoln and finally Bishop of Winchester during the reign of Queen Mary I. For several years he led the college successfully through very difficult circumstances. A capable if somewhat scholastic composer of Latin verse, he embraced the rule of Philip and Mary enthusiastically and vigorously opposed the Reformation theology.

He was active in the Marian persecutions, and (as the Cardinal's commissioner) personally conducted the final public examinations and condemnation of Nicholas Ridley and Hugh Latimer in 1555. Having given himself wholeheartedly in these affairs, he fell sharply out of favour when Mary died and, being unguarded in his opposition to Elizabeth's religious policies, he was soon deprived and imprisoned. His apologists refer to his austerity, his firmness of principle and the power of his teaching: to his opponents he was a cruel and resolute servant of the usurped power of Rome.

== Family and education ==
=== Family background ===
John White was born in Farnham in Surrey, the fifth son of Robert White, a merchant of Farnham, and his wife Katherine (née Wells). He was the elder of two brothers named John, the younger of whom was Sir John White (died 1573), citizen and Grocer, Lord Mayor of London in 1563-64. The identity of John White the bishop as the elder of the two is clear from the 1538 will of the eldest brother Henry White, an academic and cleric.

Robert White, the father, died in 1518 requesting to be buried in the church of St Andrew, Farnham. His estates were left in the hands of his executors, for his widow's use while she lived and then to descend through Robert's children and their heirs in six separate parcels. Each of the six elder sons should have one part: any part in default was to revert to the eldest surviving offspring, and so successively through all the eight sons and three daughters and their heirs. Lands and tenements in Aldershot (Hants.) and Camberley (Surrey) went first to Henry; those in Farnham, to Robert; those in Finchampstead (Berks.) and Eversley (Hants.), to Thomas; those in Cove and Winchfield (Hants.), to William; those in Passfield and Kingsley (Hants.), to John the elder, and those in Isington (Hants.) to John the younger.

Robert's executors were his widow Katherine (Wellys) and "Maister Thomas Wellys Doctour", which reveals that Henry and John White received an example for their scholarly and religious careers from their mother's side of the family. "Magister Thomas Wellis doctor theologiae" is named as having witnessed the inspection of St Dunstan's shrine at Canterbury in 1508. There were possibly two men of these names and titles at Canterbury at that time: one was a chaplain to Archbishop Warham, and one the prior of St Gregory's Priory, Canterbury and suffragan bishop of Sidon c. 1508-1511 (died 1526). They are differentiated by Henry Wharton, but merged by Anthony à Wood and Joseph Foster. Thomas Wellys, D.D., was born at Aylesford, Hampshire (i.e. Alresford), between Farnham and Winchester, and was educated at Wykeham's school, Winchester and at New College, Oxford (admitted 1484), where he took his B.A. and M.A. A different Thomas Wells altogether (died c. 1552), of the Southampton customs house, was cousin to John's sister Agnes White of South Warnborough, and on terms with Dr Steward, Chancellor of Winchester.

=== Education: Winchester College, and New College, Oxford ===
John White (the elder) entered Winchester College at the age of 11, in 1521, where he studied under the headmastership of Thomas Erlisman until 1525. He went on to New College, Oxford in that year as a Fellow, gaining full admission in 1527 after two years' probation. He studied philosophy and theology in the Arts, graduating B.A. in 1529 and proceeding to his M.A. in 1534. Winchester College was the sister foundation of New College.

The Warden of New College at that time, Dr John London (1526-1542), adhered strongly to traditional Roman Catholic observance, though by law obliged to accept the King as Supreme Head of the English Church and forbidden to make appeals to Rome. Gilbert Burnet described White as a morose, sullen man much given to scholastical divinity, "which inclined men to be cynical, to overvalue themselves, and despise others." White's personality no doubt evolved at Oxford partly by association with his eldest brother, Henry, who preceded him at New College, became Vice-Chancellor of the University for 1531, and was principal of the school of Canon Law.

== Winchester College: Headmaster (1535-1542) ==
Having obtained his M.A., and being "of good parts and great hopes", he was taken into the household of Stephen Gardiner and resigned his Fellowship. Dr London wrote highly of him to John Gostwick, seeking ways to improve his income, since the Statute in Restraint of Appeals to Rome (1533) had deprived White of a lectureship. Around 20 April 1535, aged 24 or 25, he was appointed Headmaster of Winchester College (Collegium Beate Marie juxta Winton). Under its Warden Edward More with ten Fellows, the college was subject to a Visitation for the Valor Ecclesiasticus in that year, the record showing White as Pedagogus (receiving £11.18s.5d from the rents), Richard Sedgrave under-master, and Richard Phillippes, cantarista. He taught there in that capacity for seven years, until appointed Warden in February 1541/42.

The office of Headmaster (called "Informator", or supreme moderator) of the school, was, as John Pitts explained, reserved only for the most well-read persons, to ensure the exact correctness of the instruction of the pupils: the office of Warden denoted the College's Custos, as it were the Dean of College. During White's term as headmaster, the Dissolution of the Monasteries (1536-1540) brought the threat of imminent closure onto the college itself, a threat which did not recede until 1547/48. In his own words, about 1554, White wrote:

"Septem annos docui, quae lux postrema docendi
Stata preessendi munere prima fuit.
Mutavit mihi non minuit fortuna mihi labores
Curaque non modicis rebus adaucta mihi."

Translation:

"...Seven years I taught, the last day of which teaching
Became the first of my office of Wardenship.
Fortune altered but lessened not my labours,
And my cares were in no small respects increased..."

=== Family affairs ===
John's elder brother Robert, a clothier, died at the end of 1533, and the Farnham estates went to his son Francis. John and his brothers Henry and Thomas, as executors, were to hold lands for Robert's children and for his widow Elizabeth (Morys).

When Henry White of Oxford died in 1538 he left John his De Vita Christi and Commentary on the Psalms by Ludolph of Saxony, the works of Origen, "and som other that likith him of divinitie and a psalter of fine velame covered with changeable sarcenet, and a gold ring with a red stone which I hadd of him." John did not have all, however, for Henry left his Tertullian, his Irenaeus and his Gregory Nazianzen to Dr London of New College, and the works of Clement, Athanasius and Gaetanus to Dr John Holyman of Exeter College, who later became Bishop of Bristol. These two gentlemen, together with John himself and his brother-in-law Sir Thomas White of South Warnborough, were Henry's executors. John was to hold £30 for his brother Robert's daughters when they should marry, not payable until John should gain possession of Henry's lands in Finchampstead (Berkshire), Cove and Winchfield (Hampshire). These lands had been the inheritance of brothers Thomas and William, who by 1538 must also have died: John the younger received Henry's possessions in Aldershot. Henry gave back the bedstead which John the elder had lately given him, and John the elder, now the oldest surviving son, was the acting executor in Henry's will.

== Winchester College: Warden (1542-1554) ==
On the dissolution of the Benedictine Priory of St Swithun in 1539, the Winchester Chapter was reconstituted as Trinity College. The Dean and his twelve prebendaries were incorporated subject to bishop Gardiner and his successors. White, who had been "laicus" in 1535, and was instituted to the rectory of Chilcomb near Winchester in 1537, was appointed a prebendary of Winchester in March 1540/41. In February 1541/42, when he received his appointment as Warden of Winchester College, he must already have taken priest's orders since that was a requirement for the position. In other respects, being aged over 30, holding an M.A., and being a past Fellow of New College, he fulfilled the founder's ordinances. As Warden he was permanently resident in College and engaged in some of the teaching. At the time of his appointment, or shortly before, Queen Katheryn Howard declared to him that she had not defiled the King's bed. He was instituted to the rectory of Cheriton, Hampshire, near Alresford, around July 1543.

=== Saving the College ===
Under the Act for the suppression of larger monasteries of 1539, the college of St Elizabeth at Winchester, nearby, was closed and sold to Thomas Wriothesley, Steward of Winchester College, in 1543. He sold it in 1544 to the College on condition that they re-establish the grammar school there, or else tear down the collegiate church by Whitsun 1547. The decision was taken to tear it down, losing the opportunity for a much-needed expansion into some fine medieval premises, either from a conservative preference for the old foundation, or from the impossibility of such an expansion at a time when the College itself was potentially facing its own dissolution. Next, a new survey for the Dissolution of Colleges Act 1545 showed richer pickings at Winchester. Amid a desolation of closures of noble colleges which followed, Winchester's was saved by the death of King Henry on 28 January 1546/47. On the accession of King Edward VI, the Oxford and Cambridge colleges and the schools of Eton and Winchester were granted exemptions from closure.

=== Conservatism and Reform ===
The injunctions issued by the new Commissioners of 1547, led by Sir James Hales, were probably uncongenial to the Warden. Readings from Bible at mealtimes were to be in English; scholars must have their New Testament in English or Latin, and use only the King's Primer, English or Latin, as their prayerbook. The Warden was to read to them from the Book of Proverbs and Ecclesiastes for an hour on holy days; to instruct and test them in the Catechism of Erasmus; and all graces and other routine prayers were to be said or sung in English, the old Latin anthems no more to be sung. Very troublesome, evidently, were the Warden's relations with the College's Usher, William Forde, a Protestant. According to a famous story, he brought various large crucifixes crashing down in the middle of the night by a contrivance of ropes remotely operated: The circumstances belong to around 1547, though Strype gives an earlier date. This fellow gave out books and instruction in Protestant doctrine to the pupils, and White was kept busy bringing them back to Catholicism.

In one celebrated case, a 14-year-old boy named Thomas Joliffe had been strongly influenced by Forde. White told Joliffe to study the Gospels and Epistles, and lent him works of the Eight Church Doctors as a guide to faith. The boy studied them, but soon after fell ill of sweating sickness. Calling his friends together, he announced that Forde had led him astray and urged them to burn the books he had given them. He wrote a poem testifying to the real presence in the Eucharist, made his will, declared his faith, and died of the sickness in August 1548. In later retellings, the theme evolved that the sickness had particularly afflicted pupils who had received Forde's teaching, but that is not in White's account. The story does reflect the religious divisions in the College at that time.

=== "Naughty doctrines" ===
White included Joliffe's poem in a collection of two hundred verse testimonies concerning Transubstantiation, which he gathered and eventually published as a volume entitled Diacosio-Martyrion. The book was White's response to the Lutheran doctrines embedded in Cranmer's Book of Common Prayer of 1549, and to the reform teachings of Nicholas Ridley, Martin Bucer and Peter Martyr, Regius Professor of Divinity at Oxford in 1548. White opposed particularly the Reformed doctrine of the Eucharist (which denied the real presence) professed by Peter Martyr in the public Disputation at Oxford in 1549. and prepared an Epistle to him in justification of Richard Smyth, which was eventually prefixed to the book of verses. White's book was first prepared for publication in Louvain in 1550 (to escape censure), and opened with his dedicatory verses to the Princess Mary as the sister and daughter of kings. However, the book did not then appear, but had to await more favourable conditions.

In March 1550, White was instituted to the prebend of Ipthorne within Chichester Cathedral. In the trial of Bishop Gardiner (December 1550-January 1551), White was called upon to witness on Gardiner's behalf against his accusers. His evidence served to cast both men in a favourable light: Gardiner "did cause maister White then Scholemaister, after byshop of Wynt., to make certain verses extolling the kinges supremacie against the usurped power of the Pope, encouraging also his scholers to do the lyke."

Not long after giving evidence for Gardiner (but seemingly in connection with his planned book), he was called before the King's council. He confessed to them that he had various books and letters from overseas, in particular from a scholar named Martin who was strongly opposed to King Edward's religious reforms. White had consented to these matters in such a way that he was suspected of having more extreme sympathies, and he was sent to the Tower of London. He remained there for several months until released into the custody of Archbishop Cranmer himself, with whom he lodged and by whom he was brought to show greater willingness to conform. Even so, after this sojourn, he was returned to the Tower for some time.

John Philpot, archdeacon of Winchester, issued an admonitory excommunication against White in 1551 for his "naughty" teachings. Richard Woodman, under examination in 1557, challenged his judges that they had all, in King Edward's time, taught the doctrine that was then set forth. White replied, "I was in the Tower, as the Lieutenant will bear me record."

=== Changing fortunes ===
White retained his prebend of Winchester, and in 1552 was admitted prebendary of Eccleshall, Staffordshire, within Lichfield Cathedral. While remaining Warden of Winchester College, he succeeded John Redman (first Master of Trinity College, Cambridge) as Archdeacon of Taunton (Diocese of Bath and Wells) in November 1551; in November 1554, having surrendered that office, he, together with Thomas White of South Warnborough and John White the younger, was granted a future presentation to the archidiaconate.

With Queen Mary's accession, White at once showed his true colours. On 22 August 1553 (as Warden of St Mary's College, Winchester) he was appointed to the commission to hear and decide the petition of Edmund Bonner for his reinstatement as Bishop of London. On 26 November (the eve of King Edward's funeral mass), he preached at Paul's Cross in favour of having religious processions. In December 1553, he published his Diacosio Martyrion, that book he had planned to publish in Louvain, but now as from a London press with the month and year fully stated. The Epistle to Peter Martyr (then under house arrest) was prefixed, and the verse dedication to Princess Mary remained, although she was now Queen:

"Et soror et regis proles generosa Britanni
Caesareo salve ventre, Maria, sata." (&c.)

Translation:

"Gentle sister and scion of Britannic king,
Greetings, Maria, fruit of Caesar's side." (&c.)

== Bishop of Lincoln (1554-1556) ==
=== Elevation ===
John White was succeeded as Warden of Winchester College by the election of John Boxall on 25 October 1554. As White's own appointment had been in February 1541/42, (before Lady Day 1542 and so reckoned for 1541), October 1554 fell during the fourteenth ordinal year of his Wardenship, though the term itself was less than thirteen full years' duration. On 1 April 1554, on the occasion of the consecration of six new bishops at the high altar of St Mary Overyes (Southwark), he was consecrated Bishop of Lincoln by Edmund Bonner, Cuthbert Tunstall and Stephen Gardiner. The seat was vacant by the deprivation, on 16 March, of bishop John Taylor: (Magister) John White (Sacrae Theologiae Bacalarius) received the temporalities on 2 May, and soon vacated the prebend of Eccleshall.

=== The royal marriage ===
In July 1554, during the interim between his appointment as Bishop and his resignation as Warden, came the momentous (and for White, highly propitious) occasion of the marriage of Queen Mary to Philip II of Spain. The ceremony took place at Winchester Cathedral: White was among the company who welcomed Philip on his arrival at the west doors of the cathedral, he took part in the ceremony itself, he wrote Latin verses celebrating the marriage, and he presented a collection of verses by the Winchester Scholars on that royal and sacred theme. "Amonges al others mayster Whyte, then Bishop of Lincolne (hys Poeticall vayne beyng dronken with ioy of the Maryage)," wrote John Foxe, "spued out certayne verses": he quoted from Whyte's verse genealogy showing that both Mary and Philip were descended from John of Gaunt, and added the longer verse which begins:

"Nubat ut angla anglo, regina Maria Philippo
Inque suum fontem regia stirps redeat,
Noluit humani generis daemon vetus hostis.
Sed deus, anglorum provida spes voluit..."

Translation:

"That English queen Mary should marry the Englishman Philip,
And the royal line of blood should return to its source,
The devil wished not, ancient foe of humankind.
But god, provident hope of the English, willed it... " (&c.)

This may be from the book, or part of it, which John Pitts saw at Oxford, which he called "One Volume of Epigrams and other Poems", Nubat ut Hispano Regina. By royal patent of July 1554, White's nephew Stephen White the elder (son of his sister Agnes and Sir Thomas White, now Master of Requests to Queen Mary) filled his place as rector of Cheriton. Bishop White preached at Paul's Cross on 18 November 1554.

=== White's painted chamber ===
To this moment is attributed a great embellishment to the old Warden's quarters of Winchester College. In 1885, in the removal of some panelled partitions, the timbers were found to have derived from an extensive painted ceiling and associated frieze in Florentine Antique style. The ceiling had been boarded to form panels enclosed between moulded ribs, each painted panel presenting a medallion surrounded by Italianate arabesques and Renaissance grotesques painted in grisaille within rectangular frames. The medallions contained a series of allegorical busts (in the manner of Italian cinquecento maiolica painting), alternating with medallions enclosing a monogram of the letters "I.W.", presumed to be for John White. This was a first phase of decoration painted secondarily onto an older existing ceiling structure made of Baltic oak felled in around 1500.

The frieze was painted onto wooden wall facings partly constructed at the same time as the ceiling, and partly on English oak timbers felled after 1547. The painting occupied some 50 inches of wall height and ran for some 45 feet horizontally. Beneath a gothic trefoil crest, the broad upper register was painted to represent the ornament above a projecting dentillated cornice. It showed pairs of winged and garlanded youths (springing at the waist from scrollwork with animal-headed tendrils) supporting panels (surmounted by crowns) bearing the repeated motto "VYVE LE ROY" (i.e., May The King Live). These formulations alternated with pairs of ugly putti supporting medallions or wreaths of laurel enclosing a helmeted military bust (possibly representing King Philip), or the frontal bust of a woman wearing a French hood. A narrower register painted below the imitated cornice was set with framed texts from Ecclesiastes, alternating with smaller figured medallions.

This sumptuous frieze, arresting in its original context, was a distinct phase of decoration in the same chambers, not in direct continuity with the painted ceiling. It was probably undertaken in connection with the royal marriage. Whether or not Lambert Barnard (c. 1485-1567) was involved here, Dr White as prebendary of Ipthorne probably knew of his work in the Chichester region. An inventory made in November 1554 refers to two goblets with one lid of double gilt, left by White in the "paynted chamber" (which dates the chamber to his time). There is also a sixteenth century carved stone fireplace arch in the College with the letters "P" and "R" in the spandrels, which may refer to "Phillipus Rex".

=== Trial of Ridley and Latimer ===
After Thomas Cranmer had appeared before the Queen's commissioners, a commission came on 28 September from Cardinal Pole to John White, to Dr Brokes Bishop of Gloucester, and Dr Holyman Bishop of Bristol, to examine Hugh Latimer and Dr Nicholas Ridley, pretended bishops of Worcester and London, for their opinions expressed in the Oxford disputations of 1554. The commissioners were to obtain a recantation and reconciliation with Rome, or else proceed to judgement for heresy, to strip them of their ecclesiastical dignities, excommunicate them and hand them over to the secular authorities for punishment. No time was lost: Ridley and Latimer were summoned before them at 8.00 a.m. on 30 September in the Divinity School in Oxford, which was decked with textiles and cushions. John White led the proceedings, seated with his colleagues in the high seat used for lecturers and disputations.

Ridley was examined first, and having required his respect to the court and the Cardinal (which Ridley allowed), and towards the Pope (which he refused), White called on him to recant and accept the universal authority of Rome. White reminded Ridley that he had formerly exhorted Bishop Gardiner not to make any concessions to Cranmer concerning the Sacrament." Ridley answered that the foundation of christianity was to confess that Christ was the son of god, as Saint Peter had done, and it was upon this confession, and not upon Peter as an individual, that Jesus meant that he would found his church. The primacy of Rome (he said) was, like that allowed to the Bishop of Lincoln in sittings and assizes, a dignity of the See, not a subservience to the occupant. White, having been drawn into disputation of various points (especially papal authority and transubstantiation), moved on to the five articles to which he required definitive answers.

Having followed the same procedure with Latimer, White adjourned the hearing at 1.00 p.m. until 8.00 the next morning, 1 October 1555. In St Mary's Church, Oxford the high seats were set up, and Ridley was seated at a table facing them, with chairs set about in a square for the university elders, so that the audience should not press too close. Ridley had prepared some written answers, which he was not allowed to read and which White refused to give out in full, instead making a brief recapitulation of Ridley's cause. He pronounced that Ridley had shown himself unwilling to recant on the court's terms, and condemned him with a major excommunication, to be cast out from all participation in the church and given over for punishment as a heretic. Latimer was then brought in, and attempted to renew the explanations for his theology. White, however, indicated that the time for disputation and reconsideration was past. Latimer's final answers to the articles were required and, these not varying from the previous day, White read his condemnation without more ado, and wound up the meeting with brisk efficiency. Ridley and Latimer were burned at Oxford on 16 October 1555. White's degree in Divinity was incorporated as Doctor of Divinity at the beginning of that month.

=== Visitation of Lincoln ===
Bishop Gardiner lived only three weeks to contemplate Ridley's execution. White was named an executor in Gardiner's will, preached at his requiem on 14 November 1555, and took part in the funeral procession in February 1555/56 which went from Southwark to Winchester. Having participated in the consecration of Reginald Pole (22 March 1556), he received a commission from the Cardinal to conduct a visitation of the see of Lincoln. An extraordinary number of misdemeanours, contraventions, and lapses were discovered, and great dilapidations had occurred in many of the churches. Priests who had married and/or had children, or had spoken disrespectfully of the sacred ordinances, or had performed the sacraments incorrectly, were admonished and given penances.

== Bishop of Winchester (1556-1559) ==
=== Translation ===
White sought eagerly for his own translation to the bishopric of Winchester. This occurred on 6 July 1556, after White (who had been elected at Greenwich on 15 April 1556) reached a formal agreement to pay £1000 per year to Cardinal Pole for the privilege. His episcopal register for Winchester contains the written instruments, dated 10 and 21 September 1556, together with two commissions to the Vicars-general, and the usual presentations to benefices. The custody of the temporalities was granted to him on 16 May 1556, but were not fully restored to him until 31 May 1557.

On 23 April 1557, St George's Day, King Philip processed in his robes of the Order of the Garter, Lord Talbot bearing the Sword before him: Bishop White (by virtue of office the Prelate of the Order) wore his mitre and sang mass that day. Ten Knights of the Garter were beside the King, and Secretary Petre wore a robe of crimson velvet with the Garter. Although entitled to bear his family arms, White obtained his own episcopal arms, confirmed to him by Gilbert Dethick in 1557. These are blazoned as: "Per chevron embattled or and gules, three roses counterchanged slipped vert, on a chief gules three hourglasses argent framed or."

=== Persecutions for heresy ===
White preached at St Mary Overy's on 23 May 1557, when heretics were brought in chains to hear his sermon. Taking a theme from Saint James, White said, "If any man thinke hym selfe a religious man, and in the meane tyme seduce his tongue or his hart, the same mans religion is a vayne Religion." He went on to vilify the prisoners from the pulpit, as Arrians, Herodians, Anabaptists, Sacramentaries and Pelagians. The prisoners stood up to deny the imputation, and White responded that he would have their tongues cut out and would cause them to be removed from the church by force. Two days later Stephen Gratwick (who had lived in the Chichester diocese) was brought before White at St George the Martyr, Southwark, where the bishop interrogated him, attempting to draw him into his own jurisdiction. Gratwick wrote that the bishop "played Sathan" with him, leading him up the mountain by praising his eloquence and person. White, unable to get the better of him, condemned him, and Gratwick was burned with two others in late May 1557.

Other attempts to prove heresy against Richard Woodman had fallen short, but through a testing series of confrontations at St George the Martyr, Southwark, and at St Mary Overy's, before a large assembly, White was able to draw out the evidence he needed. In these public examinations, White repeatedly demanded that the prisoners should say whether Judas Iscariot had partaken of Christ's body at the Last Supper, and, having unworthily done so, was entered by Satan. He reinforced this by repeated threats to excommunicate and condemn Woodman as a heretic if he would not answer. White eventually delivered this judgement, Woodman declaring that the judgement would be upon the judges' own heads. On 22 June 1557 Woodman was burned with nine others at Lewes in Sussex, becoming one of the Lewes Martyrs. Foxe wrote of "the great grace and wisdome of God in that man, as also the grosse ignorance and barbarous crueltie of his adversaries, especially of D. White Bishop of Winchester."

Reading these accounts, the very severe censure of John White made by John Bale in that same year, given in the second version of his Catalogue of famous writers of Great Britain, becomes understandable. Bale, who suggested that White's relationship with Joliffe had been inappropriate, and dubbed him "a jumping jackass" (saltans asinus), unlocked his hoard of invective:

"White... a terrible servant of the Roman Antichrist, endeavours with beak and claws to restore in the realm of England all the latter's tyrannies, mad idolatries, filthiness, and impious doctrines of all kinds. A deceiver of princes, a butcher of souls, a double-minded and perjured hypocrite, and an ambitious heretic, he had uplifted his god Mauzzin, a dumb, dead and dry idol, the most pernicious of all, against the true, living and holy god: and in order that, as an architect of impious doctrine and a despiser of the most patent truth, he might defend loaf-worship against Peter Martyr, the most learned theologian of our time, he brings into the arena Jews, Egyptians, pagans, rabbis, satyrs, sumners, monks, women, popes, singers, heretics, and men like Eckius, Cochlaeus, Pighius, Hofmeister, Fisher, Gagnaeus and Gardiner, as well as Ganymedes and devils, with the boy Joliffe, and More's Utopia."

Executor

In August 1558, William Windsor, 2nd Baron Windsor, making his will, appointed Bishop John White and Sir Thomas White as two of his executors. The will was not proved until December 1558, when the bishop swore to administer.

=== Imprisonment and deprivation ===
After the accession of Elizabeth I, White's days as a bishop were numbered. He preached at the funeral of the bishop of Rochester on 30 November 1558, and it was two weeks later, at the mass for Queen Mary on 14 December, that he gave offence to the new monarch by the words of his sermon. Sir John Harington takes up the story:

"His text was out of Ecclesiastes IV.ii, Laudavi mortuos magis quam viventes, et feliciorem utroque judicavi qui nec dum natus est. And speaking of Queen Mary her High Parentage, her bountifull disposition, her great gravity, her rare devotion (praying so much as he affirmed that her knees were hard with kneeling), her Justice and Clemency in restoring Noble Houses to her own privat losse and hindrance, and lastly her grievous yet patient death: he fell into such an unfaigned weeping, that for a long space he could not speak. Then recovering himself, he said she had left a Sister to succeed her, a Lady of great worth also whom they were now bound to obey: for, saith he, "melior est Canis vivus Leone mortuo", and I hope so shall raign well and prosperously over us, but I must say still with my Text, Laudavi mortuos magis quam viventes; for certain that is, Maria optimam partem elegit": at which Queen Elizabeth, taking just indignation, put him in prison, yet would proceed no further then to his deprivation, though some would have made that a more haynous matter."

In fact White's imprisonment was not immediate. Over the next three months he refused to take the Oath of Supremacy. Elizabeth, seeking to heal differences, amended the prayer-book to remove matter offensive to Catholics, and to avoid any later checks a Disputation was arranged between 9 Catholic divines (led by Dr White) and 9 most learned of the other party, held in Westminster Abbey beginning 30 March 1559. It was agreed that, for the sake of order, written statements upon the key points should be brought by the disputants, but when the time came the Catholic bishops refused to cooperate. Bishops Thomas Watson and John White behaved themselves with some violence and insolence, if not issuing actual threats at the Conference, at least being disposed to consider the Queen's excommunication in that public audience. "For this they were committed to the Tower on the fifth of April." They were taken at night from the Abbey under guard by the river to the Old Swan, thence to Billingsgate, and so to the Tower of London.

Even so, White was still a bishop able to stand as godfather to his nephew John White (son of John White the grocer by his second wife, Katherine Soday), at his christening at St Bartholomew-the-Less on 25 May 1559, together with the Lord Treasurer Marquess of Winchester, and Dame Joan Laxton, late the wife of Sir William Laxton. Five bishops were deprived of their seats on 21 June, and on 26 June the bishops of Winchester and Lincoln were similarly unthroned at the Sheriff's house in Mincing Lane, and Dr White was returned to the Tower. (These substitutions were needed to make way for the elevation of Matthew Parker to the see of Canterbury.) At 6 a.m. on the 7th of July he was finally delivered out of the Tower by Sir Edward Warner to the Lord Keeper, who gave him into the custody of his brother John White (the younger).

== Death and memorial ==
According to Henry Machyn, White died on 12 January 1559/60 of an ague, while at the house of his brother(-in-law) Sir Thomas White (died 1566) of South Warnborough (Keeper of Farnham Castle) in Hampshire, and was buried on 15 January at Winchester. (Sir Thomas was married to Agnes White, sister of the bishop.) In his will, bishop White requested burial in Winchester Cathedral, and it is usually stated that he was actually buried there.

=== Monument at Winchester College ===
There is a monument to John White in Winchester College chapel, which has a history of its own. It appears that White prepared a monumental brass for himself which consisted of a large, full-length figure depicting himself frontally, wearing a cope richly decorated with pomegranates, marguerites and Tudor roses. The effigy alone was about 52 inches in height. He was shown with flowing hair, but tonsured, his hands held almost together as if in prayer, and with a clasp lettered "I.H.S." beneath his chin. Beneath this was a blackletter inscription of 20 lines of Latin verse written by White himself, asking for prayers (as former Master, and Warden) when he shall die. The opening lines explain his fear that his name and honour will be cast away by others:

"Hic tegor, hic post fata Whitus propono jacere
Scriptor Johannes carminis ipse mei.
Sin alibi sors est putrescere qui meus esset
Tunc patior tumulus fiat ut alterius.
Ne sine honore tenax sine nomine linqueret heres
Id timui exemplis turbor et inde novis."

Translation:

"Here am I buried, here in death I propose to lie,
I, John White, who write mine own memorial song.
If it should be my lot, that elsewhere I shall rot,
Then do I suffer my tomb to be for another.
That a grasping successor should leave me no honour, no name,
I have feared, and am by recent instances troubled."

Hence the inscription should date between 1541 and 1554, while he was Warden, and before 1556, when (as Bishop) the opportunity for burial in Winchester Cathedral arose. After his death a surrounding marginal brass inscription was added, detailing the dates of his two consecrations, his deprivation, and death, though it does not state where he was buried.

During the 1870s Winchester College chapel was refurbished and many of its monuments were removed with the intention of replacing them. The White monument was dismantled, but was partially lost before it could be re-installed. Soon afterwards, Edwin Freshfield, LL.D., F.S.A., a school governor, benefactor and former pupil, arranged for a full "facsimile" to be made, the reconstruction of the brasses being made possible by the existence of rubbings taken from the original many years previously, by himself as a boy and by the antiquary Francis J. Baigent (1830-1918) of Winchester. The border inscription was already in 1770 said to be imperfect and decayed, and for the reconstructed monument some conjectural restorations were made to that text. As to the accuracy of the reconstruction of the figure, one large part of the original brass survives, showing most of the cope from the shoulders down to some way above the hem, and is preserved in the College collections. A comparison of the two shows that the replacement was a careful copy.

=== Gifts ===
John Pitts remarked that, as this outstanding man died in captivity, almost all of his manuscript writings were lost. He described White as a man of very notable piety and doctrine, a judicious poet, an eloquent speaker, a sound theologian and a sinewy preacher.

White made a benefaction to New College of the manor of Hall Park at West Meon. The principal manor of West Meon was granted, with others, to the Dean and Chapter of Winchester by Henry VIII in 1541, for the maintenance of six theology students each at Oxford and Cambridge. The manors were compulsorily surrendered again in 1545, and Hall Park was among those next granted to Thomas Wriothesley, Earl of Southampton, which passed in 1550 to his son Henry, barely out of infancy. White's benefaction was to the effect that every scholar of New College should receive 13s.4d on the day of his admission as a fellow of the college.

"He gave to Wykeham's College, near Winton, his mitre, and crosier staff; a silver tankard, gilt; a basin and ewer of silver; a Turkey carpet; and other choice goods." His sister Dame Agnes White in her will written in 1568 gives to a son "a great gilte Jugg with the vyne spredd which was his uncles the Bysshope", and to another "my gilt tankerd with the Busshoppe of Wynchesters armes".

Katheryn White, widow of Sir John, in 1574 had in her hands for her son John White "a standing cup of silver and guilte, one guilte bowle with a cover, and a guilte pott with a cover all which thre parcells were of the guifte of his late uncle John sometyme Bisshopp of Winton". These are mentioned together with a standing cup given by the Marquess of Winchester and two gilt spoons from Lady Laxton, all which must be the baptism gifts of 1559.

Church of England titles
Preceded by John Taylor	Bishop of Lincoln; 1554–1556	Succeeded by Thomas Watson
Preceded by Stephen Gardiner	Bishop of Winchester; 1556–1559	Succeeded by Robert Horne
