= Richard Woodman (martyr) =

English Protestant martyr

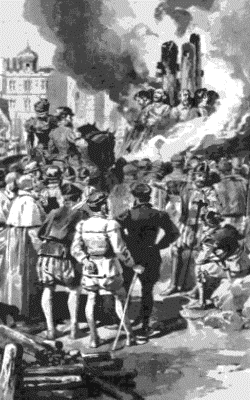
Woodman from Warbleton (and nine others) were burnt in Lewes.

Richard Woodman (1524? – 22 June 1557) was a Protestant martyr, who was born in Buxted and lived in nearby Warbleton in East Sussex. He was burnt during the Marian Persecutions in 1557 in Lewes. The cult of the Sussex Martyrs is said to have been started using an etching by James Henry Hurdis of Woodman burning as a Protestant martyr.

== Life ==
Woodman was born around 1524 in Buxted in East Sussex; he became an ironmaster, and became known whilst running an "iron-making" business that employed one hundred people. During a sermon at St Mary the Virgin Church, Warbleton, Woodman was arrested for having words with the rector which are said to have identified Woodman as a Protestant. Woodman said that the rector was preaching the exact opposite of what he previously said (before Mary was Queen). Woodman lived close to the church and his foundry was also adjacent. Woodman was in contravention of a 1553 law which protected preachers from criticism whilst preaching.

Woodman was imprisoned and investigated at intervals by local magistrates and at quarter sessions where he refused to assure them of his intention to conform. He spent periods in prison amounting to six months in total where he was examined by the Bishop of Chichester, George Day, and by the commissioners of Cardinal Pole.

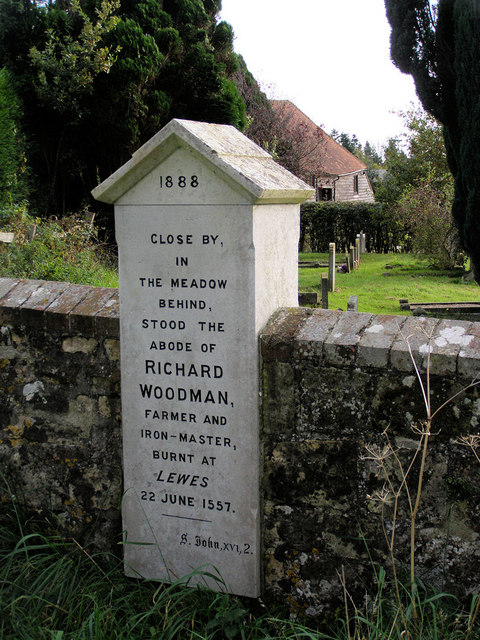
The memorial at St Mary the Virgin Church, Warbleton

Finally he was sent to the Queen's Bench in London although it is not certain if this was legal. There he stayed for another year and a half until Dr. John Story, the persecuting chancellor, sent him to the bishop's "coalhouse". Whilst a prisoner there he was further examined including an investigation by thirty respectable people who set him free on 18 December 1555. His release was unconditional as they could find no heresy and his arrest appeared to be illegal.

It was said that Woodman had submitted to the church but he (perhaps unwisely) corrected this view by undertaking preaching around his parish to correct any misunderstandings over his position.

Woodman fled abroad after a warrant had been issued for his arrest. He returned again, but was turned in by his brother (allegedly because they had a financial dispute). Woodman was again in the bishop's "coalhouse" where he was again examined before being sent to the Marshalsea prison.

John Christopherson who was to be the next Bishop of Chichester conducted a second examination on 27 April 1557, but Woodman could not be tried as Christopherson had not been appointed. John White, the Bishop of Winchester then examined Woodman in St George's Church in Southwark, but he had no jurisdiction over Woodman. Over the next few weeks, Woodman was examined again by White, Christopherson and William Roper and in combination they managed to get Woodman to admit a heresy and he was excommunicated.

Woodman was taken to Lewes and burnt in front of the Star Inn (now Lewes Town Hall), together with nine others on 22 June 1557. The nine were George Stevens, Alexander Hosman, William Mainard, Thomasina Wood, Margery Morris, James Morris, Denis Burges, Ann Ashdon and Mary Groves. This was the largest number of people burnt in England at one time and was intended to serve as a warning to others.

== Legacy ==
Woodman's martyrdom is remembered with the memorial pictured in his local churchyard, and he with others are celebrated in the Bonfire Night celebrations which are peculiar to Sussex.

M. A. Lower published the Sussex Martyrs in the mid-nineteenth century, a book credited with reviving memories of the martyrs. At the time the martyr deaths had been largely forgotten, and Lower believed that High Churchmen were referring to the Protestant Reformation and the deaths of these people as "a mistake". Following the publications "anti-popish" demonstrations took place each year around 5 November. In 1868 a figure dressed as the "Bishop of Lewes" warned Protestants of the Roman Catholic threat and the following year an effigy of the pope was to be blown up with gunpowder.
