= William Bill =

English priest and academic

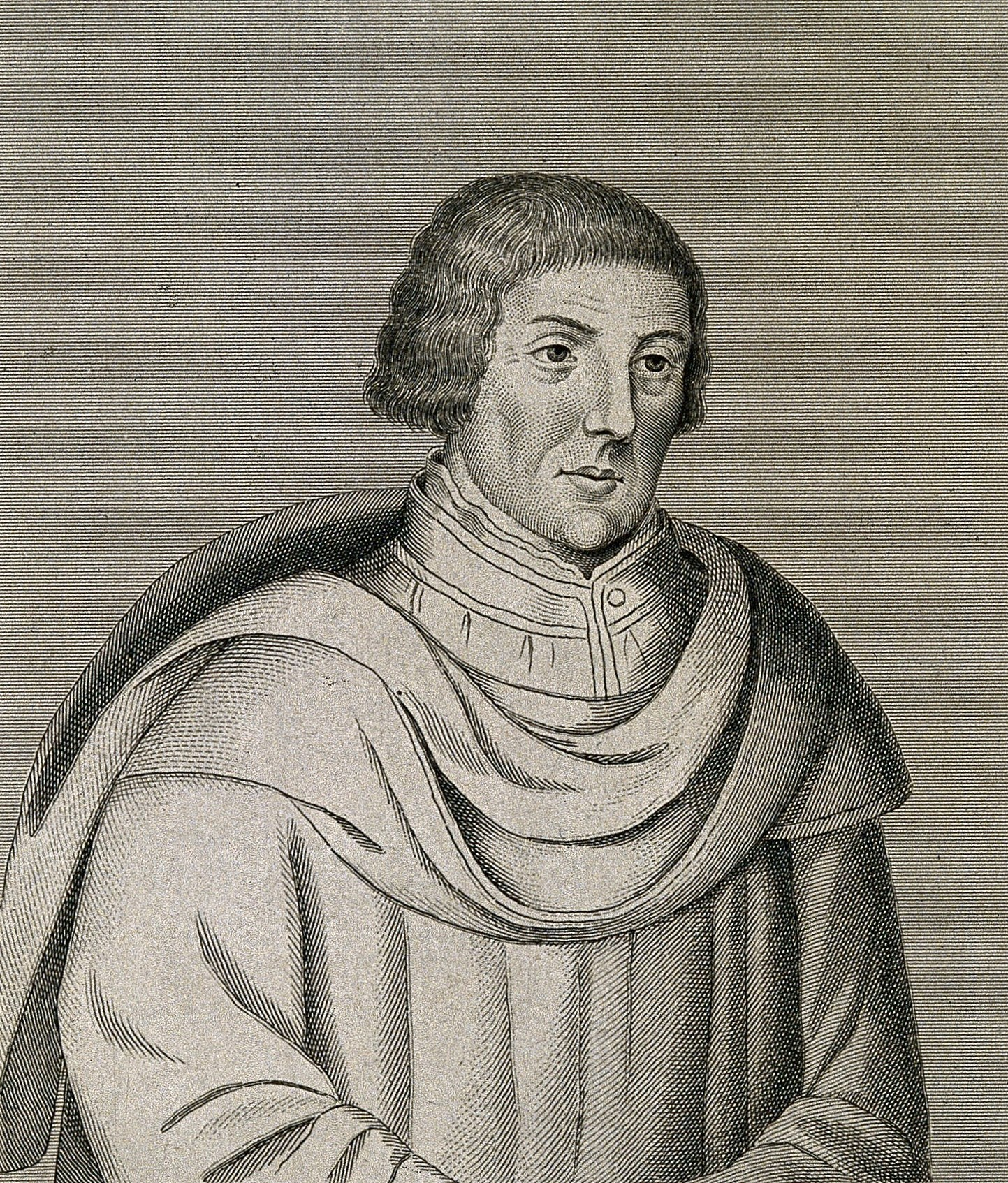
- Title: Dean of Westminster

Personal life
- Born: circa 1505 Ashwell, Hertfordshire
- Died: 15 July 1561

Religious life
- Religion: Church of England

Senior posting
- Period in office: 1560-1561
- Predecessor: John Feckenham
- Successor: Gabriel Goodman

William Bill (c. 1505 – 15 July 1561) was an English priest and academic who was Master of St John's College, Cambridge (1547–1551?), Vice-Chancellor of the University of Cambridge (1548) and twice Master of Trinity College, Cambridge (1551–1553, 1558–1561), Provost of Eton College (1558–1561) and Dean of Westminster (1560–1561).

He was born to John and Margaret Bill of Ashwell, Hertfordshire. He had two brothers and two sisters. His brother Thomas became physician to King Henry VIII. William was educated at St John's College, Cambridge, gaining his BA in 1532. He was elected a Fellow of St John's College in 1535, and gained his MA in 1546. He received a BD degree during the period 1544–1546. In 1547, he was elected Master of St John's College, and also became a Doctor of Divinity. In 1551, he was appointed Master of Trinity College. Following the accession of Mary I in 1553, he lost all his former positions. John Christopherson was appointed in his stead to the Mastership of Trinity. When Elizabeth I acceded in 1558, he was appointed Provost of Eton College, and re-appointed as Master of Trinity College. He was Lord High Almoner from 1558 to 1561 and helped revise the liturgy of Edward VI. He was appointed Dean of Westminster on 30 June 1560 but died the following year. He was buried in St Benedict's Chapel, Westminster Abbey, where his tomb and small brass figure can still be seen.

Academic offices
Preceded by John Taylor	Master of St John's College, Cambridge; 1546–1551	Succeeded by Thomas Lever
Preceded by John Redman	Master of Trinity College, Cambridge; 1551–1553	Succeeded by John Christopherson
Preceded by John Christopherson	Master of Trinity College, Cambridge; 1558–1561	Succeeded by Robert Beaumont
