= Samuel N. C. Lieu =

Historian of Manichaeism and Christianity in Central Asia and China

Samuel Nan-Chiang Lieu FBA FRHistS FSA FAHA (Chinese: 劉南強; born 4 March 1950) is a British historian of Manichaeism and Christianity in Central Asia and China.

== Education ==
Born in Hong Kong and educated at St. Paul's College, Lieu received a BA in Ancient and Medieval History from Emmanuel College, Cambridge in 1969. He later attended the University of Oxford, where he completed a DPhil in Ancient History in 1981, writing a comparative study on Manichaeism in the Later Roman Empire and Medieval China.

== Career ==
From 1974 to 1976, Lieu worked as a Junior Research Fellow in Wolfson College, Oxford. He became a Lecturer in Ancient History at University of Warwick and was eventually promoted to full professor (1976–1996). In 1996, he became Professor of Ancient History at Macquarie University, becoming a Distinguished Professor in 2010 and retiring in 2016 and becoming Emeritus Professor in 2017.

He has been elected a Fellow of the Royal Asiatic Society (1981), Fellow of the Royal Historical Society (1983), Fellow of the Society of Antiquaries (1989), Fellow of the Australian Academy of the Humanities (1999), and Fellow of the British Academy (2021). A festschrift has been prepared in his honour, entitled Byzantium to China: Religion, History and Culture on the Silk Roads: Studies in Honour of Samuel N.C. Lieu (2022).

== Personal life ==
He married Judith Lieu, a British theologian and historian of early Christianity, in 1976.

== Works ==
=== Monographs ===
- Lieu, Samuel (1998). Manichaeism in Central Asia and China. Brill. ISBN 978-90-04-43983-2.
- Lieu, Samuel N. C. (1994). Manichaeism in Mesopotamia and the Roman East. Brill. ISBN 978-90-04-29581-0.
- Lieu, Samuel N. C. (1985). Manichaeism in the Later Roman Empire and Medieval China: A Historical Survey. Manchester University Press. ISBN 978-0-7190-1088-0.

=== Edited volumes ===
- Lieu, Samuel N. C.; Thompson Glen L., eds. (2020). The Church of the East in Central Asia and China. Brepols. ISBN 9782503586649.
- Greatrex, Geoffrey; Lieu, Samuel N. C., eds. (2005). The Roman Eastern Frontier and the Persian Wars AD 363–628. Routledge. ISBN 978-1-134-75645-2.
- Lieu, Samuel N. C.; Hunter, Erica C. D.; Morano, Enrico; Pedersen, Nils Arne, eds. (2017). Manichaeism East and West. Brepols Publishers n.v. ISBN 978-2-503-57457-8.
- Lieu, Samuel N. C.; Montserrat, Dominic, eds. (1998). Constantine: History, Historiography and Legend. Routledge. ISBN 978-1-134-84185-1.
- Lieu, Samuel N. C.; Montserrat, Dominic, eds. (1996). From Constantine to Julian: Pagan and Byzantine Views: A Source History. Psychology Press. ISBN 978-0-415-09335-4.
- Dodgeon, Michael H.; Lieu, Samuel N. C., eds. (1994). The Roman Eastern Frontier and the Persian Wars AD 226-363: A Documentary History. Routledge. ISBN 978-1-134-96114-6.
