= William Burgoyne (academic) =

English priest and academic

William Burgoyne (died 1523) was an English priest and academic at the University of Cambridge, who served as Lady Margaret's Professor of Divinity and Master of Peterhouse, Cambridge.

Burgoyne graduated B.A. 1481–2, M.A. 1485, B.D. 1500–1, D.D. 1507. He was appointed a Fellow of Peterhouse in 1483.

He was a close associate of Henry Hornby, Master of Peterhouse, who was secretary and chancellor to Lady Margaret Beaufort, mother of King Henry VII. Circa 1506 Burgoyne was appointed Lady Margaret's Professor of Divinity, a position founded by Lady Margaret Beaufort. He was succeeded as Lady Margaret's Professor by Erasmus in 1511.

On Henry Hornby's death in 1518, Burgoyne succeeded him as Master of Peterhouse.

He was Rector of Hildersham, Cambridgeshire 1518–1522.

Burgoyne died before 30 January 1523, leaving £20 to Peterhouse in his will.
