= George Bullock (professor) =

British theologian (c.1521–1572)

George Bullock (c. 1521 – 1572) was an English Roman Catholic theologian.

== Life ==
He graduated as a Bachelor of Arts at St John's College, Cambridge, in 1538, becoming a fellow. In the reign of Edward VI he spent time in France, at Nevers Abbey. He was Master of St John's College, from 12 May 1554 to 20 July 1559.

He became Lady Margaret's Professor of Divinity in 1556 and graduated Doctor of Divinity in 1557. He was appointed vicar of St Sepulchre-without-Newgate in 1556, and later the same year rector of Great Munden. On the accession of Elizabeth I he was deprived of all his positions, since he refused to take the Oath of Supremacy.

He went to Antwerp as a theology lecturer, and died there in October or November 1572. He published Oeconomia concordantiarum scripturae sacrae.

Academic offices
Preceded by Thomas Watson	Master of St John's College, Cambridge; 1554–1559	Succeeded by James Pilkington
