= Alan Percy =

English churchman and academic

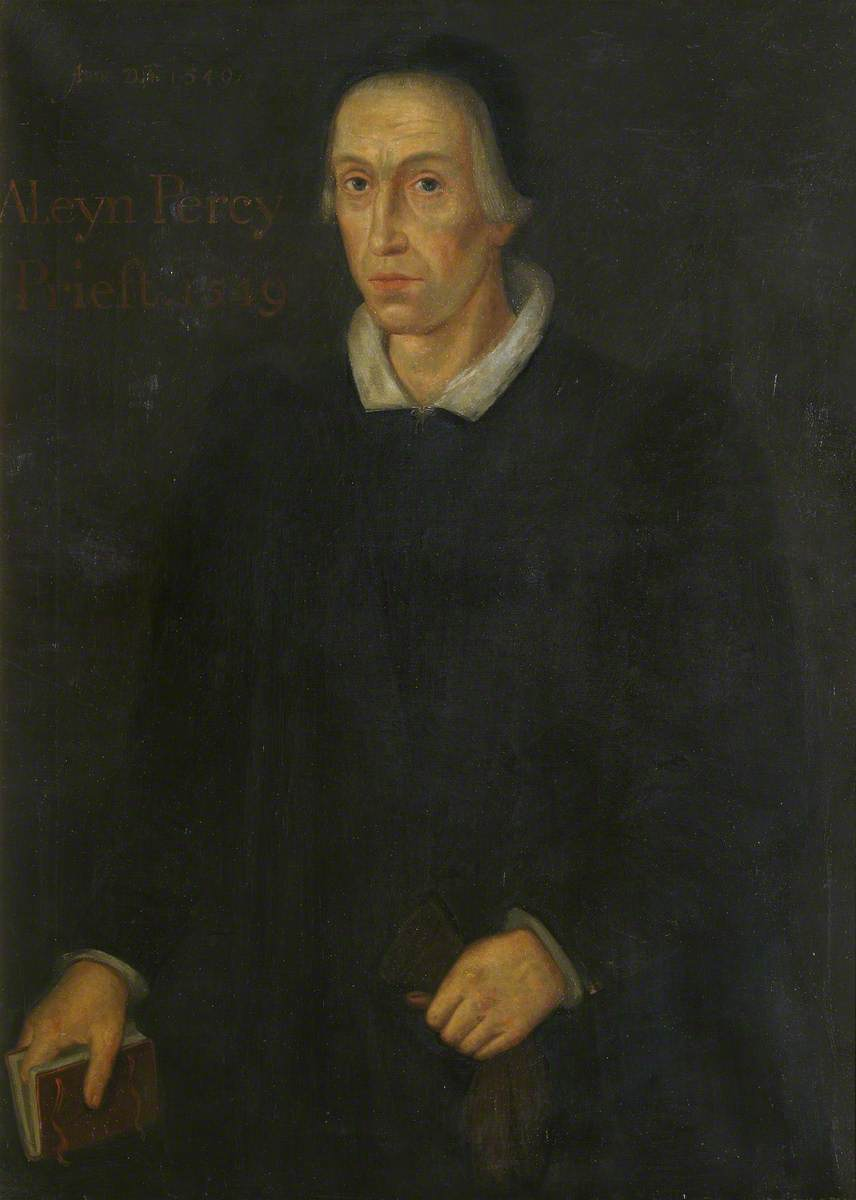
Alan Percy

Alan Percy (c.1480-1560) was an English churchman and academic, Master of St John's College, Cambridge, and later Master of Trinity College, Arundel which he surrendered to Henry VIII in 1545.

== Life ==
He was third son of Henry Percy, 4th Earl of Northumberland and Maud, daughter of William Herbert, 1st Earl of Pembroke. He is not known to have been educated at a university, but was vicar of Giggleswick, Yorkshire, from 1508 to 1517. On 6 May 1515 he received the rectory of St. Anne, Aldersgate, London, which he held till 1518.

The new foundation of St. John's College, Cambridge, chose him as their second master on 29 July 1516, probably with an eye to his Lancastrian connections and family influence, But he resigned the mastership two years later on 1 November 1518; the college granted him a small pension and some residence privileges. On 2 April 1520 Henry VIII gave him a house and garden at Stepney, Middlesex, and he gave up claims on the college the following year.

With other preferments he pursued a clerical career. On 25 October 1521 he became rector of St. Mary-at-Hill, London, which he held for the rest of his life. In 1526 Thomas Boleyn, Viscount Rochford presented him to the rectory of Mulbarton, Norfolk. He became Master of the collegiate church of the Holy Trinity at Arundel, where he succeeded the musician Edward Hygons at some point between 1535 and 1539. The college might have escaped the Dissolution of the Monasteries, since in the early 1540s it had been granted property from Hayling Priory, and other land from the dissolved St John's Priory at nearby Poling and Shipley. But an eventual dissolution of the college was prompted at court by Henry Lord Maltravers; and a late stage Percy joined with the two fellows in surrendering it to the king on 12 December 1545.

Thomas Howard, 4th Duke of Norfolk gave him the rectory of Earsham, Norfolk, in 1558; he had also been rector of Stanley Regis, Gloucestershire from 1551. Percy died in May 1560, and was buried in the old chapel of St. John's College, where there were a brass and a marble tomb to his memory.

== Notes ==
Academic offices
Preceded by Robert Shorton	Master of St John's College, Cambridge; 1516–1518	Succeeded by Nicholas Metcalfe
