= Alban Langdale =

English Roman Catholic churchman and author

Alban Langdale or Langdaile (fl. 1532–1580) was an English Roman Catholic churchman and author.

== Life ==
From Yorkshire, he studied at St John's College, Cambridge, and graduated B.A. in 1532. On 26 March 1534 he was admitted a Fellow of St John's, and in 1535 he commenced M.A. He was one of the proctors of the university in 1539, and proceeded B.D. in 1544.

Langdale took part on the Roman Catholic side in the disputations concerning transubstantiation, held in the philosophy schools before the royal commissioners for the visitation of the university and William Parr, 1st Marquess of Northampton, in June 1549. Before 1551 he left the university. Returning on the accession of Queen Mary, he was created D.D. in 1554, and was incorporated at the University of Oxford on 14 April the same year, going there with others to dispute with Thomas Cranmer, Nicholas Ridley, and Hugh Latimer.

Ordained in 1541, Langdale was rector of Buxted, Sussex, and on 26 May 1544 was made prebendary of Ampleforth in York Cathedral. On 16 April 1555 he was installed archdeacon of Chichester. He refused an offer of the deanery of Chichester. Anthony Browne, 1st Viscount Montague, to whom he was chaplain, writing to the queen on 17 May 1558, states that he had sent Langdaile to preach in places resistant to "religion". On 19 January 1559 he was collated to the prebend of Alrewas in Lichfield Cathedral, and in the following month was made chancellor there.

Langdale was one of the Catholic divines appointed to the Westminster Conference 1559. On his refusal to take the oath of supremacy he was soon afterwards deprived of all his preferments. He appeared on a list made in 1561 of recusants who were at large, but restricted to certain places. He was ordered to remain with Lord Montague, or where he should appoint, and to appear before the commissioners on 12 days' notice. Subsequently he went to the continent, where he spent the remainder of his life.

== Works ==
Langdale's works include:

- Disputation on the Eucharist at Cambridge, June 1549; in John Foxe's Acts and Monuments.
- Catholica Confutatio impiæ cuiusdam Determinationis D. Nicolai Ridlei, post disputationem de Eucharistia, in Academia Cantabrigiensi habitæ, Paris, 1556. Dedicated to Anthony, Viscount Montague.
- Colloquy with Richard Woodman, 12 May 1557; in Foxe's Acts and Monuments.
- Tetrastichon, at the end of John Seton's Dialectica, 1574.

== Notes ==
Attribution

This article incorporates text from a publication now in the public domain: Lee, Sidney, ed. (1892). "Langdaile, Alban". Dictionary of National Biography. Vol. 32. London: Smith, Elder & Co.
