= George Day (bishop) =

English Catholic bishop (c. 1501–1556)

The Right Reverend George Day
- Bishop of Chichester
- Church: Roman Catholic
- Appointed: 1543; 1553
- Term ended: 1551; 1556
- Predecessor: Richard Sampson; John Scory
- Successor: John Scory; John Christopherson

Personal details
- Born: c. 1501 Shropshire, England
- Died: 2 August 1556 (aged about 55)
- Buried: Chichester Cathedral
- Profession: Theologian
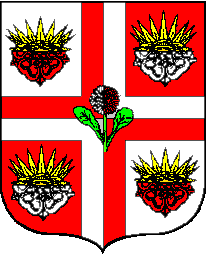
- Coat of arms

George Day (c. 1501 – 2 August 1556) was the Bishop of Chichester.

== Life ==
He graduated at the University of Cambridge in 1520–21, and became a Fellow of St. John's College, Cambridge on 19 September 1522. Though apparently always a Roman Catholic in belief, Day submitted to the assumption by Henry VIII of ecclesiastical supremacy. He was made Master of St John's in 1537, Vice-Chancellor of Cambridge University, and Provost of King's College, Cambridge (though not a fellow of it) by special exercise of the royal authority, in 1538. Consecrated Bishop of Chichester in 1543 by Thomas Cranmer, he firmly opposed the spread of the Protestant Reformation under Edward VI.

He answered in a Catholic sense Cranmer's written questions on the "Sacrament of the Altar", defended the Catholic doctrine in the House of Lords, and voted against the bills for Communion under both kinds, and for the introduction of the new Prayer Book. In his own diocese his preaching was so effective that, in October 1550, the Council felt it necessary to send "Dr. Cox, the king's almoner, to appease the people by his good doctrine, which are troubled through the seditious preaching of the Bishop of Chichester and others." In the following December, Day was brought before the Council to answer for his disregard of an injunction to have "all the altars in every church taken down, and in lieu of them a table set up", – himself preaching on the occasion, if possible in his cathedral. After repeated interrogations, his final answer was that "he would never obey to do this thing, thinking it a less evil to suffer the body to perish than to corrupt the soul with that thing that his conscience would not bear". For this "contempt" he was imprisoned in the Fleet Prison, and after further questionings was deprived of his bishopric in October 1551.

From the Fleet, he was transferred in June 1552 into the keeping of Thomas Goodrich, Bishop of Ely and at that time Lord Chancellor, in whose custody he remained until the death of Edward VI. Queen Mary I restored him at once to his dignity, besides naming him her almoner. In re-establishing the ancient worship she had, however, to proceed cautiously. Contemporary chroniclers record that Cranmer conducted Edward's funeral "without any cross or light", and "with a communion in English", though "the Bishop of Chichester preached a good sermon".

Day again preached at Mary's coronation. His formal absolution and confirmation in his bishopric by Cardinal Reginald Pole, as Papal Legate, is dated 31 January 1555. Day was involved in the trial of the Protestant martyr Richard Woodman. His death occurred only a year and a half after he was restored by Pole. He was buried in Chichester Cathedral. William Day, Bishop of Winchester, was his brother.

== Bibliography ==
- Privy Council Acts, III, IV (London, 1891)
- Francis Aidan Gasquet and Edmund Bishop, Edward VI and the Common Prayer Book (London, 1890)
- Camden Society, Grey Friar's and Wriothesley's Chronicles (London, 1852–1877)
- John Stow, Annals (London, 1615), II
- Edgar Edmund Estcourt, Anglican Ordinations (London, 1873)
- Joseph Gillow, Bibl. Dict. Eng. Cath., s. v.
- James Gairdner, Eng. Church in the Sixteenth Century (London, 1902).

Academic offices
Preceded by Francis Mallet	Vice-Chancellor of Cambridge University; 1537–1538	Succeeded by William Buckmaster
Preceded by Nicholas Metcalfe	Master of St John's College, Cambridge; 1537–1538	Succeeded by John Taylor
Preceded by Edward Foxe	Provost of King's College, Cambridge; 1538–1549	Succeeded by John Cheke
Church of England titles
Preceded by Richard Sampson	Bishop of Chichester; 1543–1551	Succeeded by John Scory
Preceded by John Scory	Bishop of Chichester; 1553–1556	Succeeded by John Christopherson
