= Robert Shorton =

English churchman and academic

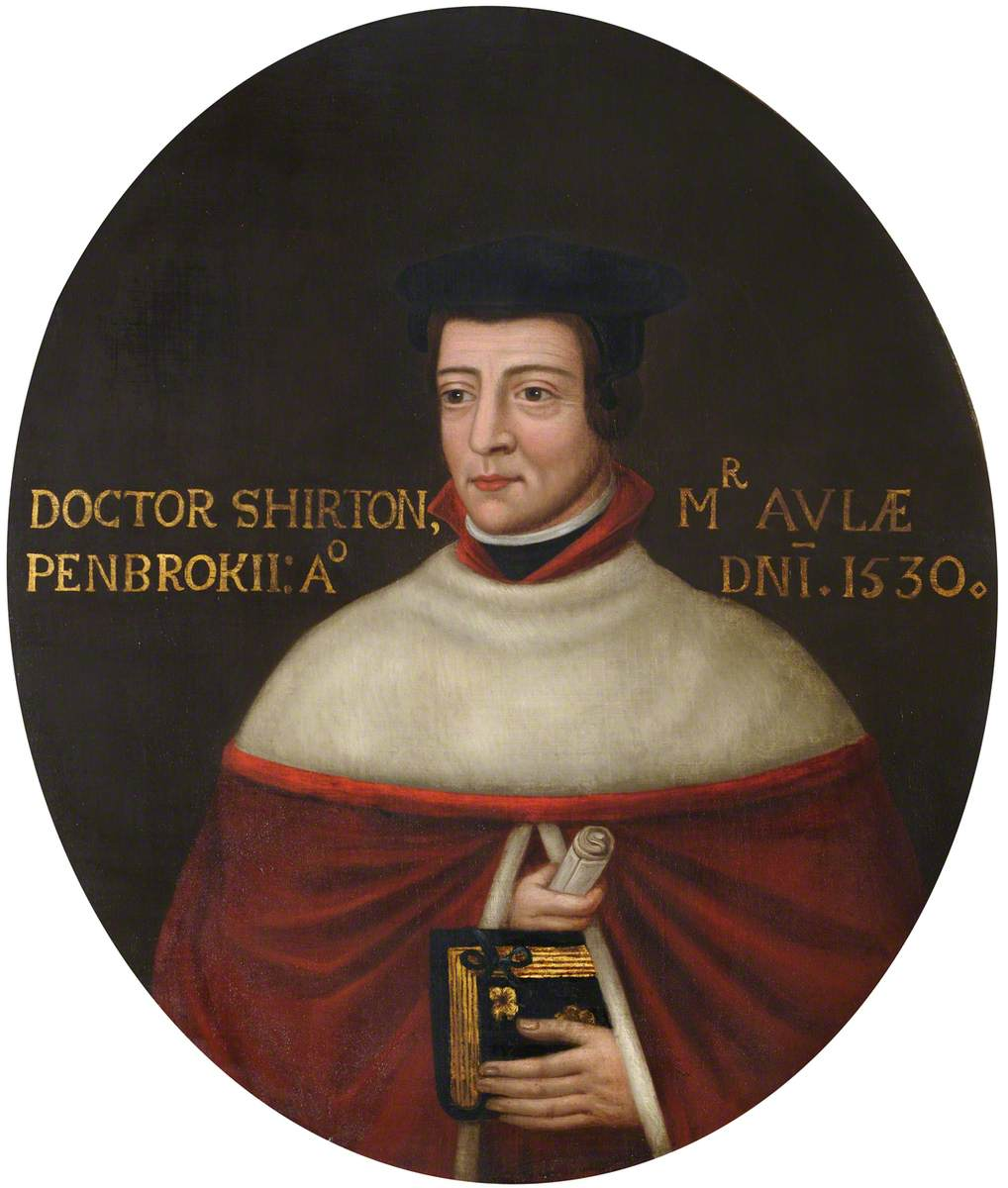
Robert Shorton

Robert Shorton (died 17 October 1535) was an English churchman and academic, first Master of St John's College, Cambridge and Archdeacon of Bath.

== Life ==
He was one of the earliest scholars of Jesus College, Cambridge. He graduated B.A. in 1501 and M.A. in 1503, and was elected fellow of Pembroke Hall on 24 November 1505. In 1507 he was chosen to preach before the university, and in 1509 graduated B.D., and was selected to read the divinity lecture instituted by Lord Chief Justice William Hussey. On 9 April 1511 he was appointed the first Master of St. John's College, newly founded by Lady Margaret Beaufort. Shorton superintended the progress of the work of building the college, resigning his office before 1517.

He was already dean of the chapel to Thomas Wolsey, and through Wolsey's influence he received preferment. On 1 November 1517 he obtained the prebend of Donnington in the diocese of York, which on 7 May 1523 he exchanged for that of Fridaythorpe in the same see. In October 1518 he was chosen master of Pembroke Hall, and in the same year was appointed rector of Sedgefield, County Durham. On 7 May 1522 he was appointed rector of Stackpole in Pembrokeshire, and on 14 April 1523 he received the prebend of Louth in Lincoln Cathedral. About this time he was of service to Wolsey in selecting scholars at Cambridge to be invited to join Wolsey's new Cardinal College at Oxford. He received the honorary degree of D.D. from Oxford in 1525.

On 8 April 1527 he was installed canon of Windsor. He was also Queen Catherine of Aragon's almoner, and, as a staunch Catholic, adhered to the Queen when the divorce question arose. He was one of the few clergymen who supported her cause in convocation. In 1529 Catherine appointed him Master of the college of Stoke-by-Clare in Sussex. In 1534 he resigned the mastership of Pembroke Hall, increasingly a Protestant institution. He became archdeacon of Bath in 1535, and, dying on 17 October of the same year, was buried at Stoke-by-Clare. By his will he left money to four Cambridge colleges.

== Notes ==
Academic offices
Preceded by First in post	Master of St John's College, Cambridge; 1511–1516	Succeeded by Alan Percy
Preceded by Richard Foxe	Master of Pembroke College, Cambridge; 1518–1534	Succeeded by Robert Swinburn
