= Nicholas Metcalfe =

Nicholas Metcalfe (died 1539) was an English churchman and college head.

== Life ==
He graduated B.A., possibly from Michaelhouse, Cambridge, in 1494/5, became M.A. in 1498, B.D. in 1503/4 and D.D. in 1506/7. He was Archdeacon of Rochester from 1512. He was also prebendary of Lincoln, and rector of Woodham Ferrers.

He was master of St. John's College, Cambridge from 1518. He built up the endowments: Metcalfe was in close touch with John Fisher, his bishop in the Diocese of Rochester and as executor to Lady Margaret Beaufort a major force behind the foundation of St. John's. Through Fisher St John's in 1524 took over property from run-down nunneries, at Bromhall in Berkshire and Lillechurch (Higham) in Kent. Another Kent property Fisher obtained was that of a hospital at Ospringe.

A steady Catholic and opponent of Hugh Latimer, Metcalfe was later praised across the religious divide by Roger Ascham for his concern for learning and its encouragement. He opposed the divorce of Henry VIII from Catherine of Aragon. In the end, by 1536, he conformed to the new church settlement. He was still compelled to resign as Master in 1537.

== Notes ==
Academic offices
Preceded by Alan Percy	Master of St John's College, Cambridge; 1518–1537	Succeeded by George Day
