= John Redman (Trinity College) =

English churchman and academic

John Redman (1499 – 4 November 1551, also written as Rydman) was a Tudor churchman and academic, the first Master of Trinity College, Cambridge (1546–1551).

Redman studied at Corpus Christi College, Oxford; St John's College, Cambridge; and the University of Paris. At Cambridge he graduated B.A. 1526, M.A. (incorporated from Paris) 1530, B.D. 1534, D.D. 1537. He became a fellow of St John's College in 1530, was Public Orator 1537–1538, Lady Margaret's Professor of Divinity from 1538 to 1542, and Warden of King's Hall from 1542 to 1546. In 1546 he was appointed by Henry VIII of England to be the first Master of Trinity College, Cambridge, and from 1549 to 1551 combined this with the Lady Margaret's divinity chair. He rebuked William Latimer over doctrinal matters.

He died on 4 November 1551, and was buried in Westminster Abbey.

Academic offices
New title	Master of Trinity College, Cambridge; 1546–1551	Succeeded by William Bill
