= George van Kooten =

Dutch theologian

The Reverend Professor George van Kooten
- Born: Geurt Henk van Kooten; 8 November 1969 (age 56); Delft, Netherlands

Ecclesiastical career
- Religion: Christianity (Protestant)
- Church: Protestant Church in the Netherlands
- Ordained: 2008

Academic background
- Education: Leiden University; Durham University; Christ Church, Oxford
- Thesis: The Pauline Debate on the Cosmos (2001)

Academic work
- Discipline: Biblical studies; theology
- Institutions: University of Groningen; Clare Hall, Cambridge

Geurt Henk van Kooten (born 8 November 1969), known as George van Kooten, is a Dutch theologian. He is the Lady Margaret's Professor of Divinity at the University of Cambridge since 2018.

Born in Delft, Netherlands, van Kooten completed a Master of Arts degree in New Testament studies from Durham University (St Chad's College) in 1995. In 1996 he earned another postgraduate degree in Jewish studies from the Oriental Institute at the University of Oxford. His doctorate, awarded in 2001, is from the University of Leiden.

He started his academic career as a lecturer at the University of Groningen (2002–2006). Subsequently he served the same school as Professor of New Testament and Early Christianity (2006–2018).
