= John Taylor (bishop of Lincoln) =

English academic and bishop of Lincoln

John Taylor (c. 1503 – 1554) was an English churchman and academic, Bishop of Lincoln from 1552 to 1554.

== Life ==
Taylor served as bursar then proctor of Queens' College, Cambridge from 1523 to 1537, and master of St John's College, Cambridge from 1538 to 1546. He was rector of St Peter upon Cornhill, London, of Tatenhill, Staffordshire, Dean of Lincoln Cathedral, a Reformer and Commissioner for the first Prayer Book.

According to John Foxe's Acts and Monuments, John Taylor walked out of mass celebrated at the commencement of the 1553 parliament. He was discharged from parliament and convocation on 5 October 1553, In 1553 Taylor was sent by Mary to the Tower for his action and that he died soon after. In later editions Foxe corrected this, asserting Taylor was commanded to attend and died shortly afterwards at Ankerwyke House at Wraysbury in Buckinghamshire.

== Notes ==
Academic offices
| Preceded by George Day | Master of St John's College, Cambridge; 1538–1546 | Succeeded by William Bill |
Church of England titles
| Preceded by Henry Holbeach | Bishop of Lincoln; 1552–1554 | Succeeded by John White |
