= Lady Margaret's Professor of Divinity =

Professorship at the University of Cambridge

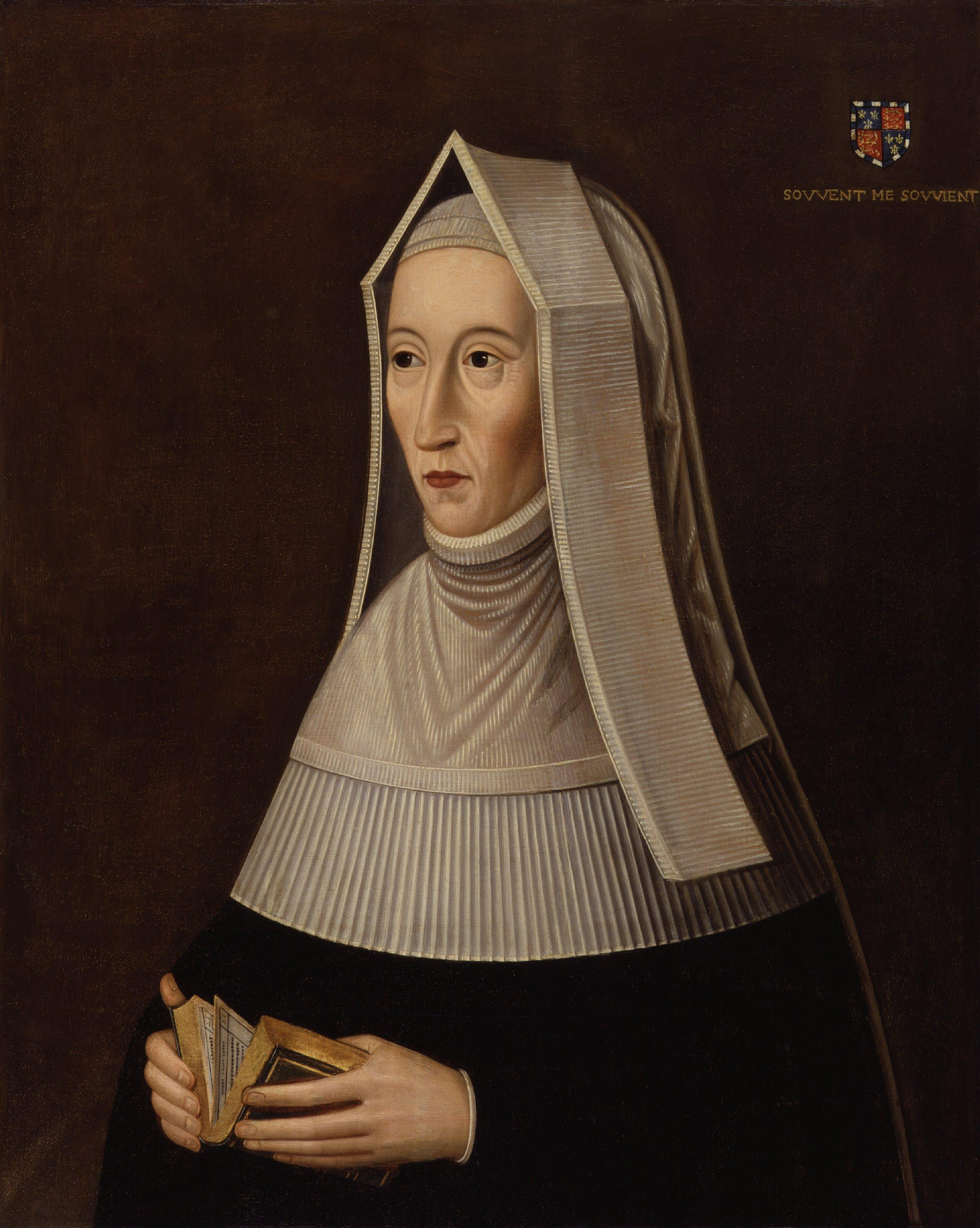
Lady Margaret Beaufort, founder of the professorship

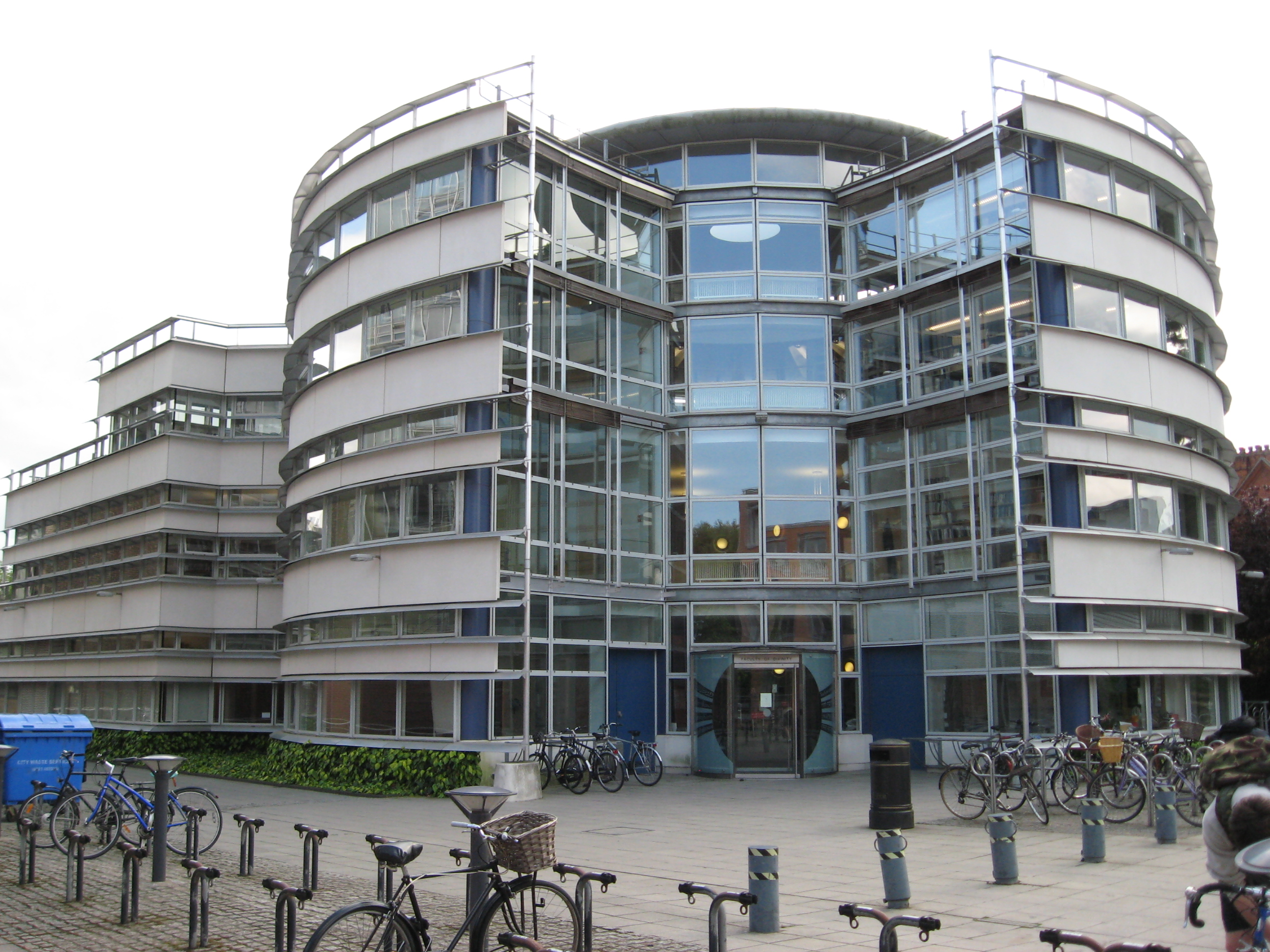
The Faculty of Divinity at the University of Cambridge

The Lady Margaret's Professor of Divinity is the oldest professorship at the University of Cambridge. It was founded initially as a readership in divinity by Lady Margaret Beaufort, mother of King Henry VII, in 1502. Since its re-endowment at the end of the 20th century, it is now specifically a chair in New Testament and early Christian studies.

There is also a Lady Margaret Professor of Divinity at the University of Oxford.

== List of Lady Margaret's Professors ==
Dates shown are date of election.

- 1502 John Fisher
- 1504 Thomas Cosyn
- 1506 William Burgoyne
- 1511 Desiderius Erasmus
- 1515 John Fawne
- 1521 Thomas Ashley
- 1532 William Buckmaster
- 1538 John Redman
- 1542 William Skete
- 1544 Wiliam Glyn
- 1549 John Redman
- 1554 Thomas Sedgwick (or Segiswycke)
- 1556 George Bullock
- 1559 Robert Beaumont (or Beamond)
- 1561 Matthew Hutton
- 1563 John Whitgift
- 1567 William Chaderton
- 1569 Thomas Cartwright
- 1570 John Still
- 1573 John Hansome (or Hanson)
- 1574 Peter Baro
- 1596 Thomas Playfere (or Playford)
- 1609 John Davenant
- 1623 Samuel Ward
- 1643 Richard Holdsworth
- 1649 Richard Love
- 1661 Peter Gunning
- 1661 John Pearson
- 1673 Ralph Widdrington
- 1688 Humphrey Gower
- 1711 Robert Jenkin
- 1727 John Newcome
- 1765 Zachary Brooke
- 1788 John Mainwaring
- 1807 Herbert Marsh
- 1839 John James Blunt
- 1855 William Selwyn
- 1875 J. B. Lightfoot
- 1879 Charles Swainson
- 1887 Fenton John Anthony Hort
- 1892 J. Rawson Lumby
- 1895 Arthur James Mason
- 1903 Alexander Kirkpatrick
- 1907 William Ralph Inge
- 1911 James Bethune-Baker
- 1935 F. S. Marsh
- 1951 C. F. D. Moule
- 1976 Morna Hooker
- 1998 Graham N. Stanton
- 2007 Judith M. Lieu
- 2018 George van Kooten
