= John Christopherson =

16th-century English bishop

The Right Reverend John Christopherson
- Bishop of Chichester
- Church: Roman Catholic
- Appointed: 7 May 1557
- Term ended: 1558
- Predecessor: George Day
- Successor: William Barlow

Orders
- Consecration: 21 November 1557 by Edmund Bonner

Personal details
- Died: December 1558

John Christopherson (died December 1558) was learned Catholic priest, chaplain and confessor to Queen Mary I of England, Master of Trinity College, Cambridge (1553–1558), Dean of Norwich (1554–1557) and Bishop of Chichester (1557–1558)—all during the reign of Queen Mary (1553–1558).

Born at Ulverstone, Lancashire, John Christopherson was educated at the University of Cambridge, graduating B.A. in 1540-41 and M.A. in 1543. He became Fellow of Pembroke College, Cambridge in 1541, Fellow of St John's in 1542 and Fellow of Trinity College, Cambridge in 1546. During the reign of Edward VI he went abroad to Louvain. In 1555, he was one of the accusers of William Wolsey and Richard Pygot, and he was involved in the trial of the Protestant martyr Richard Woodman in Southwark. He was a member of a commission under direction from Stephen Gardiner to reintroduce Catholicism to the University of Cambridge.

He died in 1558. He had been put under house arrest following his definition of Protestantism as "a new invention of new men and heresies" on 27 November 1558, preached in response to a sermon at Paul's Cross. He died a month later, in late December 1558, either the 22nd or the 28th, and was buried at Christchurch, Newgate Street, where he had held a lease to the Prior's lodging and two gardens. He is particularly known for writing a tragedy on Jephthah (based on Euripides' Iphigenia at Aulis), which is noteworthy for being the only Tudor play written in Greek. (The Scotsman George Buchanan wrote one in Latin on the same theme.)

== Sources ==
- The Master of Trinity at Trinity College, Cambridge
- On the literary milieu of Christopherson's time (a list)

Church of England titles
Preceded by George Day	Bishop of Chichester; 1557–1558	Succeeded by William Barlow
Academic offices
Preceded by William Bill	Master of Trinity College, Cambridge; 1553–1558	Succeeded by William Bill
