= Robert Beaumont (Master of Trinity College) =

16th century English academic

Robert Beaumont (c. 1525 – 1567) was an English cleric and academic, Master of Trinity College, Cambridge from 1561 to 1567 and twice Vice-Chancellor of the University of Cambridge (1564, 1566). During this time, he commissioned Hans Eworth to copy the 1537 Hans Holbein portrait of King Henry VIII. This copy was bequeathed to Trinity College where it hangs to this day.

He was known to be a reformer, and in February 1565 wrote to the then Archbishop of Canterbury complaining of "profane comedies or tragedies". He also bequeathed to the College nine works by John Calvin, which were either refused by his successor or lost before 1600.

== Life ==
Beaumont was educated at Westminster School and Peterhouse, Cambridge. He graduated B.A. in 1544, and became Fellow of his college; in 1550 he took the degree of M.A.

Beaumont was a Marian exile, in Zurich. In 1556 he joined the English congregation of Geneva. Returning to England after the death of Queen Mary, he was admitted Margaret professor of divinity (1559). He proceeded B.D. in 1560, and on 28 September of that year was presented by the Earl of Rutland to the archdeaconry of Huntingdon. In 1561 he became master of Trinity College, and vacated his professorship. He commenced D.D. in 1564, and in that year disputed a thesis in divinity before Queen Elizabeth on her visit to Cambridge.

Beaumont was vice-chancellor of the university in 1564-5, and was collated to a canonry of Ely on 15 November 1564. In 1566 he was a second time made vice-chancellor, and died in that office in 1567.

== Views ==
Beaumont was a prominent figure in the movement of the Calvinists at Cambridge against conforming to the ordinances of Elizabeth I and Matthew Parker. He subscribed to the articles of the Convocation of 1563, and, both by signing a request to the synod concerning rites and ceremonies, and by voting with the minority in convocation for the six articles on discipline, he supported the anti-ritualistic side. In the church in a letter to Parker, of 27 February 1564, he disapproved of dramatic representations among the students. He expelled John Sanderson for doctrinal reasons and contumacy; and prevented Walter Travers from gaining a fellowship also for problems of attitude, though Travers survived at Trinity, to be expelled by John Whitgift, the next Master.

On 26 November 1565 Beaumont with Roger Kelke, master of Magdalene, Matthew Hutton, master of Pembroke, Richard Longworth, master of St John's, and John Whitgift, then Margaret professor, wrote to William Cecil as chancellor of the university for a remission in the orders just issued by the queen through Parker for enforcing the use of the surplice at Cambridge. The letter angered Cecil, and Parker was contemptuous. Beaumont then wrote in his own name a submissive letter to Cecil.
