= Brett Usher =

English actor and writer (1946–2013)

- Usher in the 1970s
- Born: 10 December 1946; Southgate, England
- Died: 13 June 2013 (aged 66); Stradishall, England
- Occupation(s): Actor; Ecclesiastical historian
- Years active: 1970–2013

Brett Usher (10 December 1946 – 13 June 2013) was an English actor, writer and ecclesiastical historian. Although he appeared frequently on stage and television, it was as a radio actor that he came to be best known. His many radio roles ranged widely, from farce to Shakespeare and new works. In addition to acting he also wrote for radio.

As a historian Usher specialised in English ecclesiastical history of the 16th and 17th centuries, with particular focus on the Puritans. The first part of his study of church and state politics of Elizabeth I's reign, William Cecil and Episcopacy 1559–1577, was published in 2003. The second part, Lord Burghley and Episcopacy, 1577–1603, which was nearly complete at the time of Usher's death, was published in 2016.

== Life and career ==
=== Education and acting career ===
Usher, who was the only child of Dennis Paget Louis Usher and his wife Margot, was born at Southgate in Middlesex. He was educated at Brentwood School and Corpus Christi College, Cambridge, where he studied history. His interest in acting developed at school, where he played several leading parts including Oberon in A Midsummer Night's Dream and the title role in Richard II. At Cambridge a wider range of acting opportunities was open to him. Among many roles he played Berowne in Love's Labour's Lost for the Marlowe Society, a production that was taken to the Edinburgh Festival. His performance as Joseph Surface in The School for Scandal was praised by the reviewer in The Times:

Mr Usher gave by a wide margin the performance of the evening. His movements were assured and stylish, his speaking well-contrasted and clear and he showed a mastery of facial expression that made of Joseph a fascinatingly tortuous creature."

The culmination of Usher's undergraduate acting career was the title role in Hamlet in 1968, also for the Marlowe Society. The society had planned to stage The Merchant of Venice but, as its secretary told The Guardian, "we found that we did not have a Shylock, but we did have a Hamlet." The Times remarked that Usher's performance "would be noteworthy in a professional: in an undergraduate it is quite exceptional".

After graduation Usher pursued a career as a professional actor. Some of his early work was at the Open Air Theatre, Regent's Park, where in 1970 he was, in J. C. Trewin's words, "an uncommonly good Don John" in Much Ado About Nothing; the following season he won Trewin's praise for his performance as Friar Laurence in Romeo and Juliet. He played in the annual seasons of Toad of Toad Hall in 1970–71 and 1971–72. His stage roles in subsequent years included Malvolio to Robert Lang's Sir Toby in Twelfth Night (1972); the rebel in Peter Ustinov's The Unknown Soldier and His Wife opposite the author as the Archbishop (1973), and Allmers in Ibsen's Little Eyolf (1975). In 1981, during a year as a member of the Royal Shakespeare Company he played roles including the Duke of Venice and the Prince of Arragon in The Merchant of Venice at the Royal Shakespeare Theatre and at the Aldwych Theatre in London.

On television, Usher's first big assignment was the lead role of Michael Fane in a BBC serialisation of Compton Mackenzie's novel Sinister Street (1969), but he was perhaps best known for his role as Ken Beaumont in A Family at War (1970). Other TV appearances included Disraeli (1978), in which he played Edward Bulwer-Lytton. In 1989 he played the American orator Patrick Henry in Ludovic Kennedy's BBC television study of oratory, Reason and Intellect.

It was as a radio actor that Usher came to be best known; he worked continually for BBC radio for many years, not only as an actor but also as a writer. In the 1980s BBC radio broadcast two plays by him: The Last Two Hours of Anthony Anderson (1986) and Hyacinth (1987). In the early 1990s he wrote a radio play based on The Baby Grand by the 1920s novelist and short story writer Stacy Aumonier. In 1986 BBC Radio 3 broadcast a non-fiction work by Usher, a talk in which he "relives a personal pilgrimage to the birthplace of Hector Berlioz". (Note: Usher's musical interests ranged from Tudor to 20th century. In 1975 he published a monograph, Kurt Weill: An Appreciation, and in 1994 he contributed an article to the early music magazine Consort on the 16th and 17th century musical families the Cosyns and the Galliardellos (details in Bibliography).) As a historian, his primary interest was the later Tudor and early Stuart period – The Times described him as "an authority on Jacobean drama" – and it was from then that he chose two neglected plays to adapt for radio, Michael Drayton's Sir John Oldcastle, and John Ford's Love's Sacrifice, broadcast in 1985 and 1986. Usher's version is believed to have been the first professional production of Ford's play since its premiere more than 350 years earlier.

As a radio actor Usher's range was wide, from farce to tragedy, from classics to modern works, from soap opera to reconstructions of momentous historical events. In Ben Travers's Rookery Nook he played the Tom Walls role, Clive; In a serialised dramatisation of Sense and Sensibility in 1991 he played Colonel Brandon; in the same year he appeared with Peggy Ashcroft in a new play, In the Native State by Tom Stoppard. Another 1991 role, that of Charles I in a dramatisation of the king's trial, was followed in 1992 by the role of the supreme grand master in a six-episode adaptation of the Terry Pratchett novel Guards! Guards!. He made occasional appearances in two of BBC Radio's long-running soap operas, The Archers and Waggoner's Walk, and at around the same time played Richmond in Richard III.

=== Historian ===
In addition to his acting career, Usher was a historian. He was visiting research fellow in history at the University of Reading and also lectured at St Mary's College, Twickenham. He specialised in ecclesiastical history of the 16th and 17th centuries, with particular focus on the Puritans. The Oxford Dictionary of National Biography (ODNB) commissioned more than fifty biographies from him, some of English clerics of the pre-Reformation period, but mostly of the clergy of the late Tudor and early Stuart period. His biographies cover the struggle between the many post-Reformation factions in the Church of England. Among his subjects were John Aylmer, George Gifford and Arthur Dent – not omitting in the article on the last to mention Dent's more familiar 20th-century namesake. Usher was a founder-member of the Church of England Record Society, 1991; a member of the working committee of the John Foxe Project until 2004; and a founder-member of the Church of England Clergy Data Base Project in 1997. He was associate editor of the ODNB, 1998–2004 and research associate, 2005–13. He was elected a fellow of the Royal Historical Society in 2003.

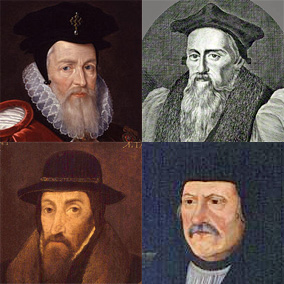
Usher's subjects included, top left clockwise, William Cecil, Bishop Aylmer, Archbishop Parker and John Foxe

Usher's principal historical work was William Cecil and Episcopacy 1559–1577, published by Ashgate in 2003. In this book Usher examined how Elizabeth I's chief minister, William Cecil, helped the queen to restore religious stability to a country wracked by two decades of divisions and uncertainty. A key to this was the future structure of the church, and Usher analysed the role of the bishops and their relationships with Cecil. The book received numerous favourable reviews, praising its combination of scholarship and readability. The Church Times said, "Readers who like detective stories ... will enjoy Usher's verve in turning taxation, land exchanges and long leases into a story of politics, personalities and ecclesiastical intrigue". The reviewer in the Sixteenth Century Journal praised the book for correcting two widespread misconceptions about the church history of the period: "it puts paid to the idea that Elizabethan government intentionally exploited sede vacante opportunities; and it gives the reader a clear picture of hardworking, conscientious bishops, laying to rest the old chestnut that they were merely timeserving opportunists." The Archive for Reformation History called the book "an example of that comparatively rare genre; a piece of genuinely original research". The reviewer added, "The sequel can only be anticipated with enthusiasm". A second part was planned, and was substantially completed, but Usher did not live to see it through publication. The final editing of the manuscript was undertaken by Kenneth Fincham, Professor of Early Modern History at the University of Kent. The book was published in 2016, under the title Lord Burghley and Episcopacy, 1577–1603.

In addition to the Cecil book, Usher published several substantial essays and papers. They include "The Deanery of Bocking and the Demise of the Vestiarian Controversy", published in 2001, examining the eventual failure of Archbishop Matthew Parker to impose conformity throughout the country with the 1559 Book of Common Prayer, and an essay, Foxe in London 1550–87, a 9,000-word study of aspects of the life of John Foxe published in 2011. He was co-editor of Conferences and Combination Lectures in the Elizabethan Church (2003), and a contributor to books including The Myth of Elizabeth (2003), The Elizabethan World (2003), Puritans and Puritanism in Europe and America (2006), and The Tudors and Stuarts on Film (2009).

Usher died of pancreatic cancer at his home in Stradishall, Suffolk, survived by his wife Carolynn, and their two daughters. He was buried at St Mary the Virgin church, Dedham, Suffolk.

== Bibliography ==
=== As author ===
- Kurt Weill: An Appreciation. York: privately printed. 1975.
- William Cecil and Episcopacy 1559–1577. St Andrews studies in Reformation history. Aldershot, UK; Burlington, US: Ashgate. 2003. ISBN 978-0-7546-0834-9.
- Lord Burghley and Episcopacy 1577–1603. St Andrews studies in Reformation history. Farnham, UK; Burlington, US: Ashgate. 2016. ISBN 978-1-4724-5969-5.

=== As editor ===
- with Patrick Collinson; John Craig (2003). Conferences and combination lectures in the Elizabethan church: Dedham and Bury St Edmunds, 1582–1590. Woodbridge, UK: Boydell. ISBN 978-1-84615-050-0.

=== As contributor (books) ===
==== ODNB articles ====
- John Aylmer
- Thomas Barbar
- John Barthlet
- Edward Brocklesby
- James Calfhill
- Roger Carr
- Edmund Chapman
- Thomas Cole
- William Cole
- Nicholas Crane
- Thomas Crooke
- Culverwell family
- William Day
- Arthur Dent
- Stephen Egerton
- Richard Fletcher
- John Freeman
- Caesar Galliardello
- Mark Anthony Galliardello
- Thomas Gatacre
- Thomas Gataker
- George Gifford
- William Gouge
- John Gough
- George Heton
- Martin Heton
- Thomas Heton
- William Hubbock
- Robert Hutton
- Nicholas Kervile
- Thomas Knell
- William Negus
- Josias Nicholls
- Robert Norton
- Oliver Pigg
- John Plough
- Robert Rich
- Arthur Saul
- Gregory Scott
- Thomas Simpson
- John Standish
- John Sterne
- Richard Stock
- John Thornborough
- Henry Tripp
- Richard Vaughan
- Thomas Watts
- George Withers
- Richard Wolman
- Robert Wright
- John Young.

==== Other (books) ====
In order of publication

- Diana Wood, ed. (1992). "The Jew that Shakespeare Drew". Christianity and Judaism: papers read at the 1991 Summer Meeting and the 1992 Winter Meeting of the Ecclesiastical History Society. Cambridge, US: Blackwell. ISBN 978-0-631-18497-3.
- Diana Wood, ed. (1992). "The Silent Community: Early Puritans and the Patronage of the Arts". The Church and the Arts. Oxford: Blackwell. ISBN 978-0-631-18043-2.
- D M Loades, ed. (1997). "In a time of persecution: new light on the secret Protestant congregation in Marian London". John Foxe and the English Reformation. Aldershot, UK and Brookfield, US: Scolar Press. ISBN 978-1-85928-351-6.
- D M Loades, ed. (1999). "Backing Protestantism: The London Godly, the Exchequer and the Foxe Circle". John Foxe: An Historical Perspective. Brookfield, US: Ashgate. ISBN 978-1-84014-678-3.
- Stephen Taylor, ed. (1999). "Edward Brockelsby: The first put out of his living for the surplice". From Cranmer to Davidson: a Church of England miscellany. Woodbridge, UK and Rochester, US: Boydell. ISBN 978-0-85115-742-9.
- R N Swanson, ed. (1999). "Expedient and experiment: the Elizabethan lay reader". Continuity and change in Christian worship: papers read at the 1997 Summer Meeting and the 1998 Winter Meeting of the Ecclesiastical History Society. Woodbridge, UK and Rochester, US: Boydell. ISBN 978-0-9529733-4-8.
- Susan Doran and Thomas S Freeman, ed. (2003). "Queen Elizabeth and Mrs Bishop". The Myth of Elizabeth. Basingstoke and New York: Palgrave Macmillan. ISBN 978-0-333-93083-0.
- D M Loades, ed. (2004). "Essex evangelicals under Edward VI: Richard Lord Rich, Richard Alvey and their circle". John Foxe at home and abroad. Aldershot, UK and Burlington, US: Ashgate. ISBN 978-0-7546-3239-9.
- Francis J Bremer and Tom Webster, ed. (2006). "Aylmer, John and ten others". Puritans and Puritanism in Europe and America: A Comprehensive Encyclopedia. Santa Barbara, US: ABC-CLIO. ISBN 978-1-57607-678-1.
- Kenneth Fincham and Peter Lake, ed. (2006). "The Fortunes of English Puritanism: an Elizabethan perspective". Religious politics in post-reformation England: essays in honour of Nicholas Tyacke. Woodbridge: Boydell. ISBN 978-1-84383-253-9.
- Kate Cooper and Jeremy Gregory, ed. (2007). "Thomas Walbot: the Last 'Freewiller' in Elizabethan England?". Discipline and diversity: papers read at the 2005 Summer Meeting and the 2006 Winter Meeting of the Ecclesiastical History Society. Woodbridge: Boydell Press. ISBN 978-0-9546809-3-0.
- Susan Doran and Thomas S Freeman, ed. (2009). "Shakespeare in love: Elizabeth I as Dea ex Machina". Tudors and Stuarts on film: historical perspectives. Houndmills, UK and New York: Palgrave Macmillan. ISBN 978-1-4039-4070-4.
- Susan Doran and Norman L Jones, ed. (2011). "New wine into old bottles: the doctrine and structure of the Elizabethan church". The Elizabethan World. Milton Park UK and New York: Routledge. ISBN 978-0-415-40959-9.

==== Other (journals) ====
- "The Cosyns and the Galliardellos: Two Elizabethan Musical Dynasties", The Consort – European Journal of Early Music, Volume 50, No 2, Autumn 1994, pp. 95–110. ISSN 0268-9111
- "Durham and Winchester Episcopal Estates and the Elizabethan Settlement: A Reappraisal", The Journal of Ecclesiastical History, Volume 49, No 3, July 1998, pp 393–406. ISSN 0022-0469
- "The Deanery of Bocking and the Demise of the Vestiarian Controversy", The Journal of Ecclesiastical History, Volume 52, No 3, July 2001, pp 434–455. ISSN 0022-0469
- Review of John Le Neve, Fasti ecclesiae anglicanae, 1541–1857, X: Coventry and Lichfield diocese, compiled by Joyce M. Horn, The Journal of Ecclesiastical History, Volume 55, No 3, July 2004, p. 591. ISSN 0022-0469
- "John Jewel Junked", The Journal of Ecclesiastical History, Volume 59, No 3, July 2008, pp. 501–511. ISSN 0022-0469
- Review of Bishops, wives and children. Spiritual capital across the generations, by Douglas J Davies and Mathew Guest, The Journal of Ecclesiastical History, Volume 60, No 3, July 2009, pp 640–641. ISSN 0022-0469

== Notes, references and sources ==
=== Sources ===
- Parker, John, ed. (1972). Who's Who in the Theatre (fifteenth ed.). London: Sir Isaac Pitman and Sons. ISBN 978-0-273-31528-5.
- Herbert, Ian, ed. (1977). Who's Who in the Theatre (sixteenth ed.). London: Sir Isaac Pitman and Sons. ISBN 978-0-273-00163-8.
