= Robert Hutton =

Robert Hutton may refer to:

- Robert Hutton (metallurgist) (1876–1970), English metallurgist, known for assisting academics to flee Nazi Germany
- Robert Hutton (divine) (died 1568), English cleric and Marian exile
- Robert Hutton (politician) (died 1870), Irish politician, MP for Dublin City, 1837–1841
- Robert Howard Hutton (1840–1887), English bonesetter
- Bob Hutton (1872–1920), British sport shooter
- Robert Hutton (footballer) (1879–1958), English footballer
- Robert Hutton (actor) (1920–1994), American actor
- Bobby Hutton (1950–1968), treasurer and first recruit of the Black Panther Party
- Rob Hutton (born 1967), American businessman and member of the Wisconsin State Assembly
