= Arthur Saul =

Arthur Saul may refer to:

- Arthur Saul (canon) (died 1586), English cleric
- Arthur Saul (chess), British writer on chess
