= The Life and Death of Mr Badman =

1680 book by John Bunyan

The Life and Death of Mr. Badman: An Analysis of a Wicked Man's Life, as a Warning For Others, Presented to the World in a Familiar Dialogue Between Mr. Wiseman and Mr. Attentive is a 1680 fiction book by the English nonconformist preacher John Bunyan. It was designed as a companion to The Pilgrim's Progress and was published by Nathaniel Ponder. The two characters have a dialogue about sin and redemption over the course of a long day.

The scholar James Blanton Warey described the work as an English precursor to the novel, especially the picaresque novel. The work depicts "Badman" as a pseudonym for a real man who is dead. He died without honour, and his family and offspring do not mourn his death. He did not merit a memorial, and he failed to earn any badges and scutcheons.

== Background and plot ==
In his preface titled "The Author to the Reader," Bunyan announces that Mr Badman is a pseudonym for a real man who is dead. Mr Badman's relatives and offspring continue to populate Earth, which "reels and staggereth to and fro like a Drunkard, the transgression thereof is heavy upon it." In a mock eulogy, Bunyan says Mr Badman did not earn four themes commonly part of a funeral for a great man.

First, there is no wrought image that will serve as a memorial, and Bunyan's work will have to suffice. Second, Mr Badman died without Honour, so he earned no badges and scutcheons. Third, his life did not merit a sermon. Fourth, no one will mourn and lament his death.

Bunyan then describes the sort of Hell awaiting Mr Badman, citing Scripture. He said he published it to address the wickedness and debauchery that had corrupted England, as was his duty as a Christian, in hopes of delivering himself "from the ruins of them that perish."

== Influence ==
Bunyan acknowledged the work was influenced by a work by Essex minister Arthur Dent (Puritan) titled The Plaine Man's Pathway to Heaven, which was set up as a dialogue between Theologus and Philagathus. That work also had other characters, including Asunetus and Antilegon. Scholar Frank Wadleigh Chandler described it as a "Puritan romance of roguery," Scholar James Blanton Warey described it as an English precursor to the novel, especially the picaresque novel.

John Brown of Bedford came out with a version for Cambridge University Press in 1905 that included Bunyan's The Holy War.
