= James Calfhill =

Anglican priest (1530?–1570)

The Venerable James Calfhill
- Archdeacon of Colchester
- Church: Church of England
- Province: Canterbury
- Diocese: London
- In office: 1565–1570
- Predecessor: John Pullain
- Successor: George Withers
- Other post: Bishop-designate of Worcester

Orders
- Ordination: 14 January 1559 (deacon); 9 June 1560 (priest)

Personal details
- Born: 1530? Edinburgh, Scotland
- Died: August 1570 (aged c. 40) Bocking, Essex, England
- Denomination: Anglican
- Education: Eton College, King's College, Cambridge, Christ Church, Oxford

James Calfhill (also Calfield; 1530?–1570) was an Anglican priest, academic and controversialist, who died as Archdeacon of Colchester and Bishop-designate of Worcester.

== Life ==
He was a native of Edinburgh, was educated at Eton College, and entered King's College, Cambridge, in 1545. In 1548 he was appointed a student of the new foundation of Christ Church, Oxford. He graduated B.A. 1549, M.A. 1552, B.D. 1561, and D.D. 1565–6.

Calfhill was ordained deacon on 14 January 1559, and in the same month instituted to the rectory of West Horsley, Surrey. He took priest's orders on 9 June 1560, and became canon of Christ Church Cathedral, Oxford on 5 July following. In 1561 Calfhill superintended the reinterment of the remains of Catherine, wife of Peter Martyr, at Christ Church. He had the bones of Catherine and relics of Frideswide intermingled.

On 16 May 1562 Calfhill became rector of St. Andrew Wardrobe, London, and was proctor both for the clergy of London and the chapter of Oxford in the convocation of 1563, where he was a conspicuous "precisian", with Arthur Saul. On 14 December 1562 he was presented by the queen to the penitentiaryship of St. Paul's and the annexed prebend of St. Pancras.

On 18 February 1564 he was appointed Lady Margaret professor of divinity at Oxford. On 4 May 1565 he became rector of Bocking, Essex, appointed by Archbishop Matthew Parker, and on 16 July became archdeacon of Colchester. He applied unsuccessfully to secretary Cecil for the provostship of King's College, Cambridge, in 1569. In 1570 he was nominated to the bishopric of Worcester, vacant by the translation of Edwin Sandys to London, but died in August at Bocking before election or consecration. He left a widow, to whom administration of his effects was granted on 21 August 1570.

Calfhill is said to have been a cousin of Tobias Matthew, whom he persuaded to take orders.

== Works ==
Calfhill was a staunch Calvinist. A friend of John Foxe praised an eloquent sermon preached by him at St. Paul's Cross in January 1561, bewailing the bondage of Oxford to the "papistical yoke". Walter Haddon complained to Archbishop Parker in July 1564 of a sermon preached by Calfhill before the queen, as shrill and lacking in required wit for the court; and in 1568 he preached two sermons at Bristol in defence of John Calvin, against Richard Cheyney, bishop of Gloucester, who then held Bristol in commendam. The bishop complains that Calfhill would not share a meal with him afterwards; with John Northbrooke Calfhill had attacked Cheyney's views on free will.

During Queen Mary's reign Calfhill published some Latin verses in reply to some composed by Bishop John White of Lincoln, in honour of the queen's marriage. Sapientiæ Solomonis liber carmine redditus, dedicated to Queen Elizabeth, 15 May 1559 (Royal MSS. 2 D ii.) records the fact that he met Elizabeth at Hanworth in 1554.

His major work was an Answer to the Treatise of the Crosse (1565), against John Martiall, who had dedicated his book to Queen Elizabeth on hearing that she had retained the cross in her chapel. Martiall replied, and was answered in turn by William Fulke. It was edited for the Parker Society by Richard Gibbings in 1846. He also wrote:

- Querela Oxoniensis academiæ ad Cantabrigam (a Latin poem on the death of Henry and Charles Brandon), 1552.
- Historia de exhumatione Catherinæ nuper uxoris Pet. Martyris (included in a volume of pieces relating to Martin Bucer, edited by Conrade Hubert in 1562). It includes two Latin poems and two epigrams by Calfhill on the same occasion.
- Poemata varia.

A lost Latin tragedy Progne was performed for Queen Elizabeth in 1564 (or 1566). It is believed, based on an account left by John Bereblock, to have been based on Gregorio Corraro's version of Ovid's story of Procne, which was published in 1558.

== Notes ==
Attribution

"Calfhill, James" . Dictionary of National Biography. London: Smith, Elder & Co. 1885–1900.

Church of England titles
Preceded by John Pullain	Archdeacon of Colchester; 1565–1570	Succeeded by George Withers
Preceded by Edwin Sandys as Bishop of Worcester	Bishop-designate of Worcester; 1570	Succeeded by Nicholas Bullingham as Bishop of Worcester
