= Edmund Grindal =

Archbishop of Canterbury from 1576 to 1583

The Most Reverend Edmund Grindal
- Archbishop of Canterbury
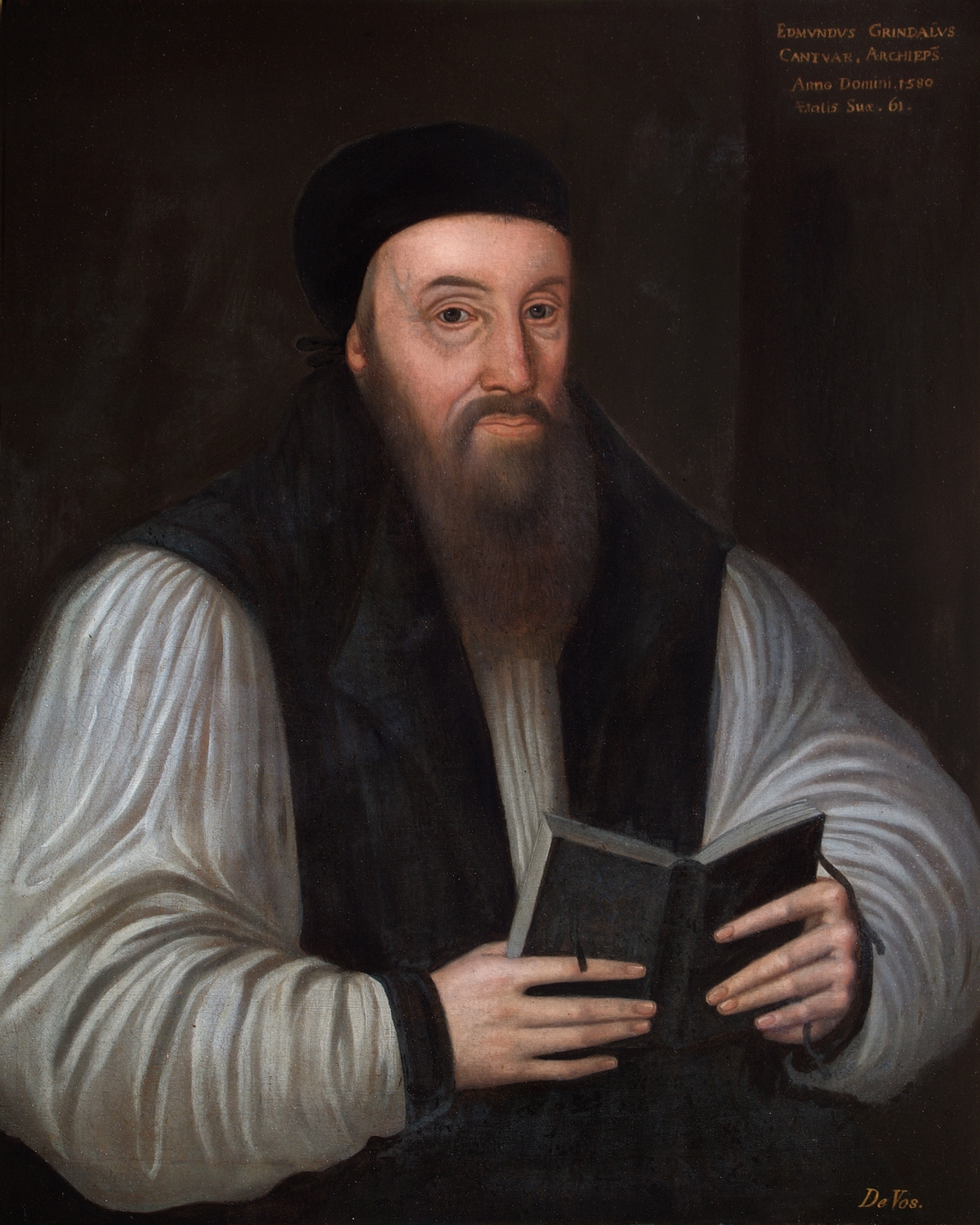
- Church: Church of England
- Diocese: Canterbury
- In office: 1576–1583
- Predecessor: Matthew Parker
- Successor: John Whitgift

Orders
- Consecration: 21 December 1559 by Matthew Parker

Personal details
- Born: c. 1519 St Bees, Cumberland
- Died: 6 July 1583 (aged 63-64) London
- Buried: Croydon
- Education: Christ's College, Cambridge

Edmund Grindal (c. 1519 – 6 July 1583) was successively Bishop of London, Archbishop of York, and Archbishop of Canterbury during the reign of Elizabeth I. Though born far from the centres of political and religious power, he had risen rapidly in the church during the reign of Edward VI, culminating in his nomination as Bishop of London. However, the death of the King prevented his taking up the post, and along with other Marian exiles, he was a supporter of Calvinist Puritanism. Grindal sought refuge in continental Europe during the reign of Mary I. Upon Elizabeth's accession, Grindal returned and resumed his rise in the church, culminating in his appointment to the highest office.

The late 16th century was a time of great change in the English church, following the Elizabethan settlement. Although Grindal historically was not regarded as a particularly notable church leader, his reputation has been revived by modern critical scholarship, which maintains he had the support of his fellow bishops and set the course for the development of the English Church in the early 17th century.

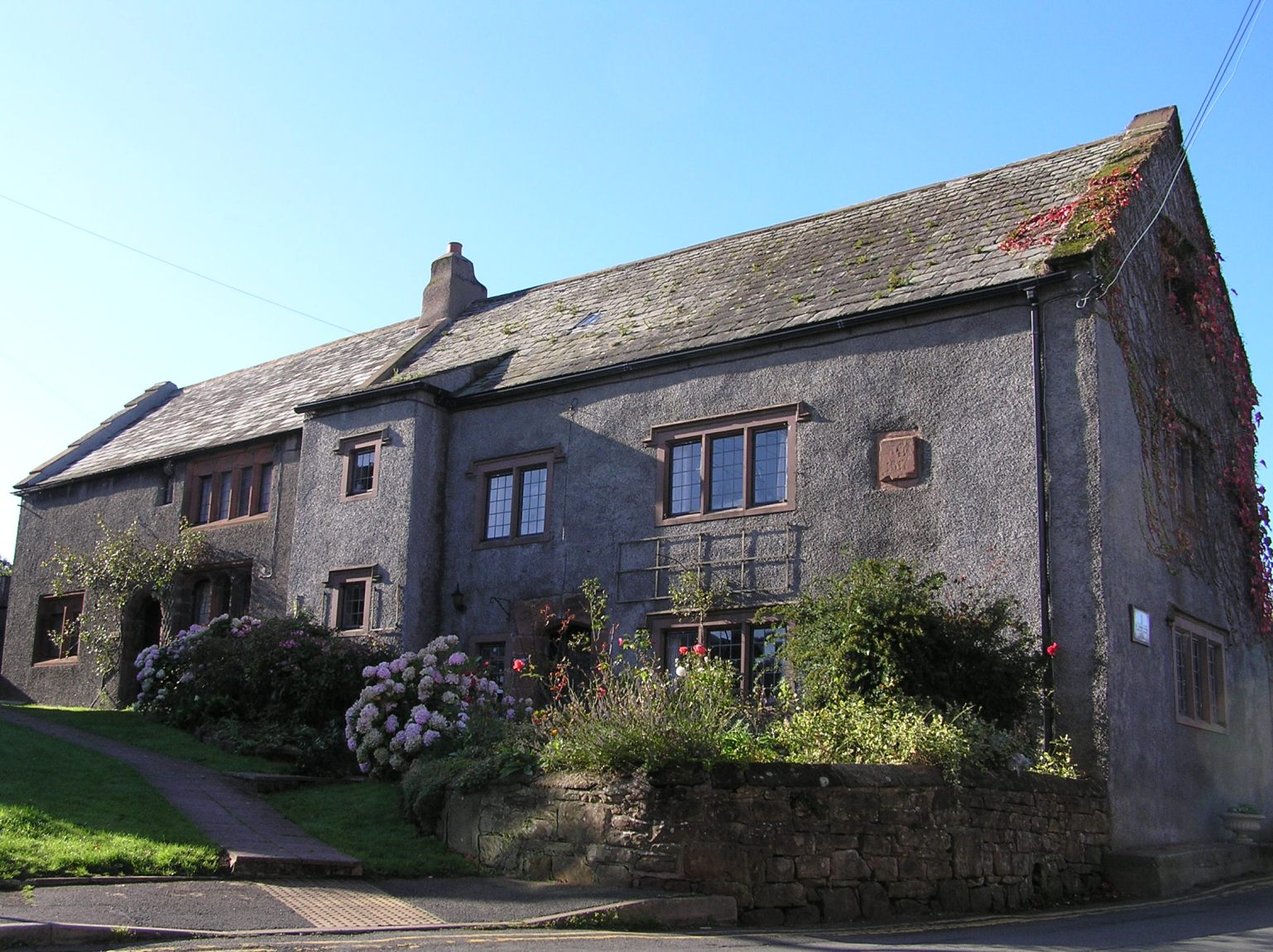
Edmund Grindal's birthplace, Cross Hill House, St Bees, Cumbria

== Early life to the death of Edward VI ==
Tradition, as retailed by Grindal's biographer John Strype, had long held that Grindal was born in Hensingham, now a suburb of Whitehaven. However modern scholarship has shown that his birthplace was in fact Cross Hill House, St Bees, Cumberland. Grindal himself described his birthplace in a letter to Sir William Cecil, Elizabeth I's Secretary of State: "the house wherein I was born, and the lands pertaining thereto, being a small matter, under twenty shillings rent, but well builded at the charges of my father and brother": which corresponds to Cross Hill House. This has been proven by the discovery of the long-mislaid St. Bees long leases, which have provided the missing link in the chain of ownership back to William Grindal, Edmund's father, a farmer in the village. Grindal's exact date of birth is uncertain, but is c. 1519.

His education may have started with the monks at the nearby St Bees Priory, though this is not recorded. It is believed by Collinson that both Grindal and Edwin Sandys (later Archbishop of York) shared a childhood, quite probably in St Bees. Sandys himself recalled that he and Grindal had lived "familiarly" and "as brothers" and were only separated between Sandys's 13th and 18th years. It is thought likely that Sandys grew up at nearby Rottington. Edwin Sandys kept one step behind Grindal in their subsequent careers, succeeding him as Bishop of London, and then as Archbishop of York. Whatever the place of early education, it is known that the Marian martyr John Bland was the schoolmaster of Sandys, so it is likely he would also have taught Grindal.

Grindal was educated at Magdalene and Christ's colleges and then at Pembroke Hall, Cambridge, where he graduated BA and was elected a fellow in 1538. Having obtained his MA in 1541, he was ordained deacon in 1544, appointed proctor in 1550 and was Lady Margaret preacher 1548–1549. Probably through the influence of Nicholas Ridley, who had been master of Pembroke Hall, Grindal was selected as one of the Protestant disputants during the visitation of 1549. He had a talent for this work and was often given similar tasks.

When Ridley became Bishop of London, he made Grindal one of his chaplains and gave him the precentorship of St Paul's Cathedral. Grindal was soon promoted to be one of King Edward VI's chaplains and prebendary of Westminster, and in October 1552 was one of six to whom the Forty-Two Articles were submitted for examination before being sanctioned by the Privy Council. According to John Knox, Grindal distinguished himself from most of the court preachers in 1553 by denouncing the worldliness of courtiers and foretelling the evils that would follow the king's death.

Grindal benefited greatly from the patronage of Ridley and Sir William Cecil during this period, to the extent that on 11 June 1553 he was nominated to be Bishop of London. However, only a month later Edward VI was dead, and very soon Catholicism would return with a vengeance under Mary I, earning her the epithet "Bloody Mary".

== Exile ==
Although Grindal was not politically compromised by the events surrounding the accession of Mary I in October 1553, he had resigned his Westminster prebend by 10 May 1554, and made his way to Strasbourg as one of the Marian exiles. In 1554 he was in Frankfurt, where he tried to settle the disputes between the "Coxians", who regarded the 1552 Prayer Book as the perfection of reform, and the "Knoxians", who wanted further simplification.

== Bishop of London ==
Arms of Grindal of Cumberland - Quarterly or and azure, a cross or and ermine, in each quarter a dover or and azure, counterchanged of the field

He returned to England in January 1559 in the company of his friend Edwin Sandys, later to be Archbishop of York, on the day that Elizabeth I was crowned. He was soon gathered in to the body of men who would be at the centre of establishing the reformed church. He was appointed to the committee to revise the liturgy, and was one of the Protestant representatives at the Westminster conference. In July 1559 he was elected Master of Pembroke Hall in succession to the recusant Thomas Young (1514?–1580) and finally created Bishop of London in succession to Edmund Bonner, six years after his first nomination in Edward's reign. About this time he ordained his friend the martyrologist John Foxe.

Grindal had qualms about vestments and other traces of "popery" as well as about the Erastianism of Elizabeth's ecclesiastical government. Firmly Protestant, he did not mind recommending that a Roman Catholic priest "might be put to some torment", and in October 1562 he wrote to William Cecil, begging to know "if that second Julian, the king of Navarre, is killed; as he intended to preach at St Paul's Cross, and might take occasion to mention God's judgements on him". Nevertheless, he was reluctant to execute judgements on English Puritans, and failed to give Matthew Parker much assistance in rebuilding the shattered fabric of the English Church. Indeed he had appointed a number of Marian exiles who went on to play a major role in the resistance to Parker:Thomas Huyck, Thomas Cole, John Pullain, James Calfhill, Alexander Nowell.

Grindal lacked that firm faith in the supreme importance of uniformity and autocracy which enabled John Whitgift to persecute nonconformists whose theology was identical to his own. London, which was always a difficult see, involved Bishop Sandys in similar troubles when Grindal had gone to York. As it was, although Parker said that Grindal "was not resolute and severe enough for the government of London", his attempts to enforce the use of the surplice evoked angry protests, especially in 1565, when many nonconformists were suspended. This developed into a breakaway movement that formed the London Underground Church. Grindal repeatedly raided their services and imprisoned worshippers, but generally for short spells, agreeing with the Privy Council 'to move [them] to be conformable by gentleness'. Grindal of his own accord denounced Thomas Cartwright to the council in 1570. Other anxieties were brought upon him by the burning of his cathedral in 1561, for although Grindal himself is said to have contributed £1,200 towards its rebuilding, the laity and even the clergy of his diocese were not generous.

== Archbishop of York ==
In 1570 Grindal became Archbishop of York, where Puritans were few and coercion would be required mainly for Roman Catholics. His first letter from his residence at Cawood Castle to Cecil told that he had not been well received, that the gentry were not "well-affected to godly religion and among the common people many superstitious practices remained." It is admitted by his Anglican critics that he did the work of enforcing uniformity against the Roman Catholics with good-will and considerable tact.

He must have given general satisfaction, for even before Parker's death two persons so different as Cecil (now Lord Burghley), and Dean Nowell independently recommended Grindal's appointment as his successor, and Edmund Spenser spoke warmly of him in The Shepheardes Calender as the "gentle shepherd Algrind".

== Archbishop of Canterbury ==
Grindal was appointed Archbishop of Canterbury on 26 July 1575, though there is no actual proof that the new archbishop ever visited the seat of his see, Canterbury, not even for his enthronement.

Burghley wished to conciliate the moderate Puritans and advised Grindal to mitigate the severity which had characterised Parker's treatment of the nonconformists. Grindal indeed attempted a reform of the ecclesiastical courts, but his activity was cut short by a disagreement with the Queen. Elizabeth wanted Grindal to suppress the "prophesyings" or meetings for sermon training and discussion which had come into vogue among the Puritan clergy, and she even wanted him to discourage preaching. Instead of carrying out his instructions, Grindal responded with a 6,000-word letter defending prophesyings, saying: 'I choose rather to offend your earthly Majesty than to offend the heavenly majesty of God.' In June 1577 he was suspended from his jurisdictional - though not his spiritual - functions for disobedience. He stood firm, and in January 1578 Secretary Wilson informed Burghley that the Queen wished to have the Archbishop deprived. She was dissuaded from this extreme course, but Grindal's sequestration was continued in spite of a petition from Convocation in 1581 for his reinstatement. Elizabeth then suggested that he should resign; he declined to do so, and after apologising to the Queen he was reinstated towards the end of 1582. However, his infirmities were increasing, and while making preparations for his resignation, he died and was buried in Croydon Minster.

== Legacy ==
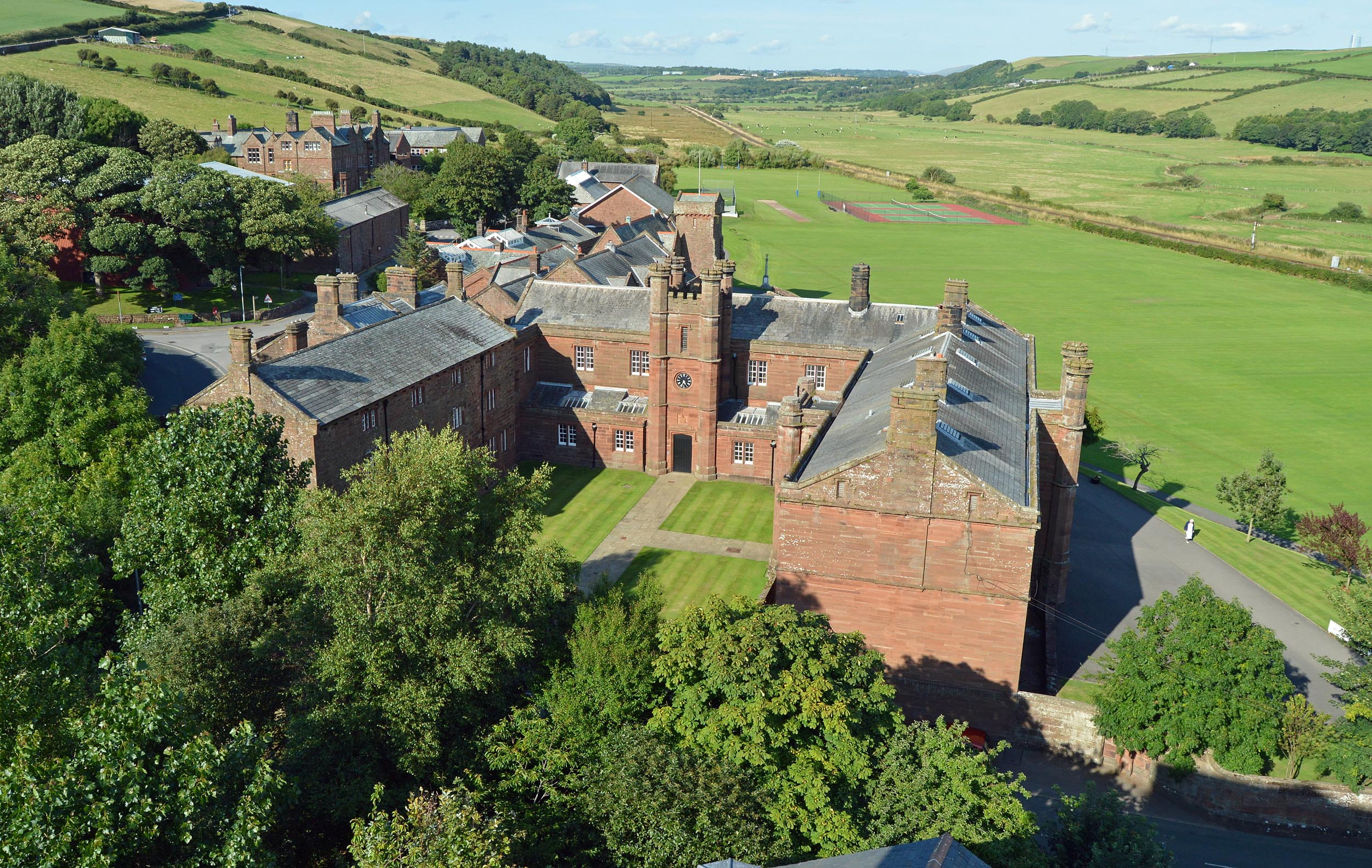
St. Bees School, Cumbria, the Foundation block. The original Elizabethan school is the range on the left of the quad.

By the 17th century, Grindal came to be admired by the Puritans who were experiencing persecution at the hands of Archbishop Laud.

John Milton, who rejected episcopal church government, thought the Elizabethan bishops had been Laodiceans, neither hot nor cold, but thought Grindal had been "the best of them" in his tract Of Reformation of 1641.

William Prynne had no time for Parker ("over pontifical and princely") and Whitgift ("stately pontifical bishop"), but praised Grindal in 1641 as "a grave and pious man". Richard Baxter in 1656 claimed of Grindal: "Such bishops would have prevented our contentions and wars." Daniel Neal a century later, in his History of the Puritans, called him "the good old archbishop", "of a mild and moderate temper, easy of access and affable even in his highest exaltation", "upon the whole ... one of the best of Queen Elizabeth's bishops".

Conversely, Grindal came to be attacked by High Church Tories. Henry Sacheverell, in his famous sermon of 5 November 1709, "The Perils of False Brethren, Both in Church and State", attacked him as "that false son of the Church, Bishop Grindall ... a perfidious prelate" who deluded Elizabeth into tolerating the "Genevan Discipline" and thereby facilitating "the first plantation of dissenters". This attack on Grindal's memory led to John Strype publishing his biography of Grindal, helped by a subscription list that included many leading Whig politicians and churchmen.

By the late 19th and early 20th centuries, it was Sacheverell's portrayal of a weak and ineffective prelate that had come to be the predominant view. Sidney Lee claimed Grindal "feebly temporised with dissent"; Mandell Creighton called him "infirm of purpose"; Walter Frere said Grindal possessed a "natural incapacity for government"; and W. P. M. Kennedy said he had "a constitutional incapacity for administration" which was Grindal's "outstanding weakness". However, in 1979 was published the first critical biography of Grindal, by Patrick Collinson, who said that Grindal was neither weak nor ineffectual but had the support of his fellow bishops and led the way for how the English Church would develop in the early 17th century.

Grindal left considerable benefactions to Pembroke Hall, Cambridge, Queen's College, Oxford, and Christ's College, Cambridge; he also endowed a free school at St Bees, and left money for the poor of St Bees, Canterbury, Lambeth and Croydon.

The most enduring monument to Grindal has proved to be the St Bees School (a "free grammar school"), which he founded in his native village of St Bees, where he had not been for perhaps forty-five years. Only three days before his death Grindal had published statutes for the school; a series of minute and specific regulations which are a noted treasury of information for historians of Tudor education. Although the school was to be sometimes at risk in its early years, a school building had been erected by 1588 at a cost of £366.3s.4d. and endowed with annual revenues of £50. Nicholas Copland was nominated by Grindal as the first Headmaster and a tradition of learning had begun which continued without a break for over four centuries. In 2015 it was announced that the school was to close, but it re-opened in 2018.

Grindal also played a part in the establishment of Highgate School in North London, for which he gave land, and he is credited with having introduced the tamarisk tree to the British Isles.

== Notes ==
Academic offices
Preceded by John Young	Master of Pembroke College, Cambridge; 1559–1561	Succeeded by Matthew Hutton
Church of England titles
Preceded by Edmund Bonner	Bishop of London; 1559–1570	Succeeded by Edwin Sandys
Preceded by Thomas Young	Archbishop of York; 1570–1576	Succeeded by Edwin Sandys
Preceded by Matthew Parker	Archbishop of Canterbury; 1576–1583	Succeeded by John Whitgift
