= Listed buildings in Soulby =

Soulby is a civil parish in Westmorland and Furness, Cumbria, England. It contains eight listed buildings that are recorded in the National Heritage List for England. All the listed buildings are designated at Grade II, the lowest of the three grades, which is applied to "buildings of national importance and special interest". The parish contains the village of Soulby and the surrounding countryside. All the listed buildings are in the village, and consist of a church, a bridge, a farmhouse and associated structures, a house, and a commemorative pump.

== Buildings ==
Name and location	Photograph	Date	Notes
St Luke's Church; 54.49465°N 2.38974°W		1663	The church was restored in 1873. It is in stuccoed stone and has a roof of stone flags with stone copings. On the east gable is a ball finial and on the east gable is a bellcote with wrought iron weathercock. The south porch, added in 1889, is gabled with a slate roof and has an apex cross, and the doorway has a round head. On the north side is an 18th-century lean-to vestry.
Soulby Bridge; 54.49328°N 2.38837°W		1819 (probable)	The bridge carries a road over Scandale Beck, and was rebuilt on cutwaters dating probably from the 17th century. It is in stone, and consists of three semicircular arches on two piers with cutwaters. The parapet has stone copings.
Belsey Gate Farmhouse; 54.49151°N 2.39096°W	—	Mid 19th century	The farmhouse is in stone with a slate hung west end, and has end pilasters with cornices and modillions. It has a slate roof, two storeys, and a symmetrical front of three bays. The central doorway has a fanlight and a cornice, and the windows are sashes in stone surrounds.
Buildings northwest of Belsey Gate Farmhouse; 54.49159°N 2.39142°W	—	19th century	The farm buildings are of three builds, and are in stone with quoins and slate roofs. The openings include doorways, and an archway with a segmental head. There are two flights of steps leading to loft doors, and a projecting porch.
Building southwest of Belsey Gate Farmhouse; 54.49132°N 2.39121°W	—	19th century	The farm building is of two builds. It is in stone and has quoins and a stone-flagged roof. The building contains doorways, a large full-height entrance, and steps leading to a loft door.
Railings and gate, Belsey Gate Farmhouse; 54.49175°N 2.39116°W	—	Mid 19th century	Along the front of the garden is a low wall with cast iron railings, and in the centre is a gate. They have spearhead standards and finials.
Hutton Lodge; 54.49169°N 2.39022°W		Mid 19th century	A stone house, pebbledashed at the front, with quoins and a hipped slate roof. There are two storeys, and a symmetrical front of three bays. In the centre is a gabled porch, and the windows are sashes in stone surrounds.
Jubilee Pump; 54.49338°N 2.38934°W		1887	The pump was erected on a well to commemorate the Golden Jubilee of Queen Victoria. It has a wooden pump case with a lead spout and a cast iron handle. Surrounding the circular enclosure is a drystone wall with limestone on the top.
