= Soulby =

Village and civil parish in Cumbria, England

Coordinates: 54.49371°N 2.38902°W

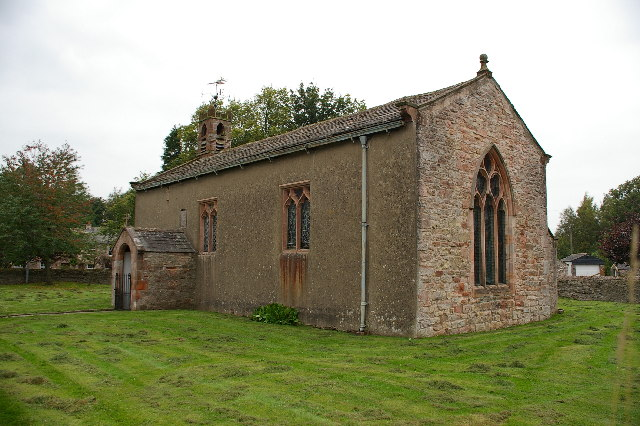
- St Luke's Parish Church

- Location in Eden, Cumbria Location within Cumbria
- Population: 187 (2011)
- OS grid reference: NY7411
- Civil parish: Soulby
- Unitary authority: Westmorland and Furness
- Ceremonial county: Cumbria
- Region: North West
- Country: England
- Sovereign state: United Kingdom
- Post town: KIRKBY STEPHEN
- Postcode district: CA17
- Dialling code: 01768
- Police: Cumbria
- Fire: Cumbria
- Ambulance: North West
- UK Parliament: Westmorland and Lonsdale

Soulby is a village and civil parish in Westmorland and Furness Unitary Authority of Cumbria, England. The parish had a population of 186 in 2001, increasing slightly to 187 at the 2011 Census. The village has a village green.

== Famous people ==
- Robert Howard Hutton, bonesetter, was born here in 1840.

== See also ==
- Listed buildings in Soulby

- Map sources for Soulby
