= John Gifford (pastor) =

English nonconformist minister)

- Born: Unknown; England
- Died: 1655; Bedfordshire, England
- Occupations: Nonconformist minister, Military officer

John Gifford (died 1655) was an English nonconformist pastor of a Baptist church in Bedford, England.

He was a predecessor of and a spiritual counsellor to John Bunyan, the author of the Christian allegory The Pilgrim's Progress (that features a character Evangelist that is portrayed after Gifford). Gifford's exact birth date is unknown, though it is estimated by historians to be somewhere in the late-1500s or early-1600s. Gifford served as a Royalist army officer, and later converted to Christianity after a period of personal crisis. Following his conversion, he became the pastor of the free church in Bedford.
