= John Barthlet =

English theological writer

John Barthlet or Bartlett (fl. 1566), was an English theological writer.

Barthlet was a minister of the Church of England, and held strongly Calvinistic opinions. In 1566 he published a work entitled the Pedegrewe [Pedigree] of Heretiques, wherein is truly and plainely set out the first roote of Heretiques began in the Church since the time and passage of the Gospel, together with an example of the offspring of the same. London, by Henry Denham for Lucas Harryson. On the title-page is an engraving of the bear and ragged staff, and the book is dedicated to the Earl of Leicester, who is described as a "speciall Mecaenas to euery student, and "so fauorable and zelous a friend to the ministrie. Some Latin hexameters and sapphics by graduates of Cambridge, addressed to the reader, preface the volume.

The work was prepared as a reply to the 'Hatchet of Heresies' (Antwerp, 1565), an anti-Lutheran pamphlet, translated by Richard Shacklock, of Trinity College, Cambridge, from the De origine haeresium nostri temporis of cardinal Stanislaus Hosius, bishop of Chełmno and Warmia. Barthlet, scandalised by Shacklock's contempt for the doctrines of the Reformation, tried to show that all Roman Catholic doctrines were tainted by heresies traceable to either Judas Iscariot or Simon Magus.

His table of heretics is long, and includes such obscure sects as ‘Visiblers,’ ‘Quantitiners,’ ‘Metamorphistes,’ and ‘Mice-feeders.’ A letter from a John Bartelot to Thomas Cromwell, dated 1535, revealing a scandalous passage in the life of the prior of Crutched Friars in London, is printed from the Cottonian MS. in Wright's 'Letters relating to the Suppression of Monasteries,’ p. 59 (Camden Soc.) A John Bartlet was vicar of Stortford, Essex, from 23 February 1555–6 until 5 March 1560–1. 'One Barthlett, a divinity lecturer of St. Giles', Cripplegate,’ was suspended by Bishop Grindal on 4 May 1566. It is probable that these notices refer to the author of the 'Pedegrewe,’ whose name was very variously spelt.
