= Sandwith, Cumbria =

Coordinates: 54.519°N 3.600°W

Sandwith
- Village
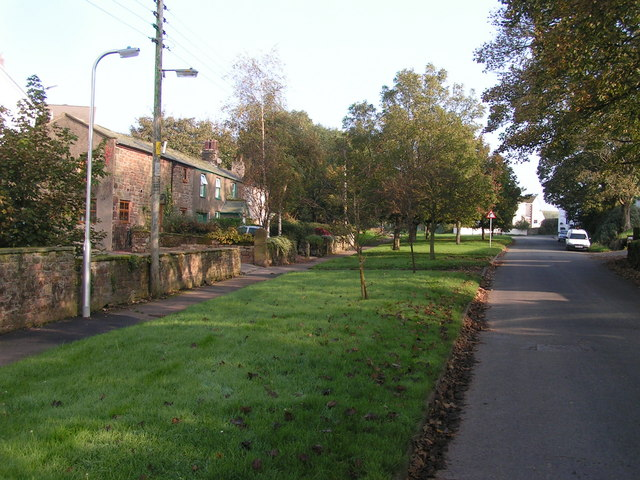

- Location in the former Copeland Borough Location within Cumbria
- OS grid reference: NX965149
- Civil parish: Whitehaven
- Unitary authority: Cumberland
- Ceremonial county: Cumbria
- Region: North West
- Country: England
- Sovereign state: United Kingdom
- Post town: WHITEHAVEN
- Postcode district: CA28
- Dialling code: 01946
- Police: Cumbria
- Fire: Cumbria
- Ambulance: North West

Sandwith is a settlement and former civil parish in Cumbria, England, about 7 miles from Workington and near St Bees. It lies in the parish of Whitehaven, in Cumberland unitary authority area. Sandwith was also a ward; in 2011 the ward had a population of 2463. In 1931, the parish had a population of 332.

== History ==
The name "Sandwith" means 'Sandy ford'. Sandwith was formerly a township in the parish of St Bees, from 1866 Sandwith was a civil parish in its own right until 1 April 1934 when it was abolished and merged with Rottington and Whitehaven parishes.
