= John Bunyan =

English writer and preacher (1628–1688)

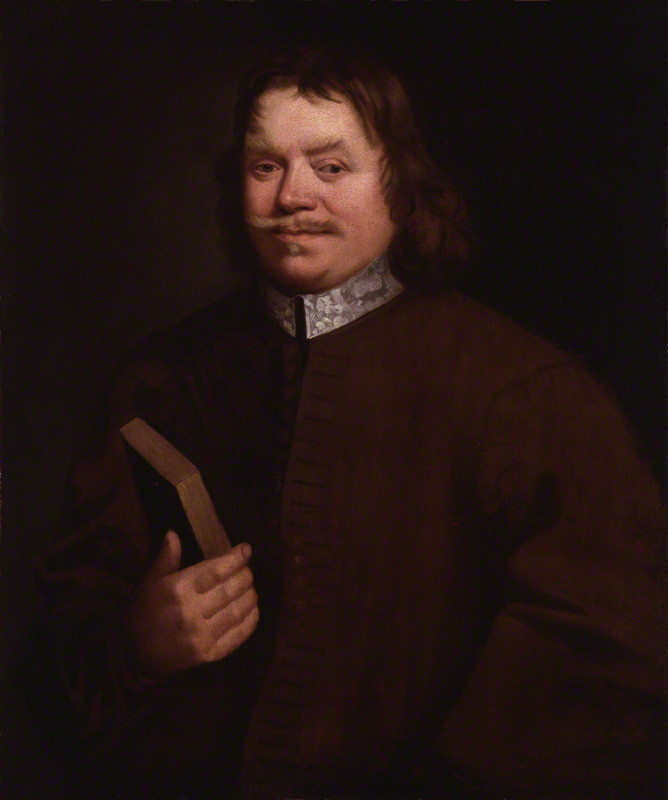
- 1684 portrait of Bunyan by Thomas Sadler
- Born: 1628; baptised 30 November 1628; Elstow, Bedfordshire
- Died: 31 August 1688 (aged 59); London, England
- Occupations: Writer and preacher
- Writing career
- Genres: Christian allegory, sermons, Socratic dialogue, poetry
- Notable works: The Pilgrim's Progress, The Life and Death of Mr. Badman, The Holy War

Signature
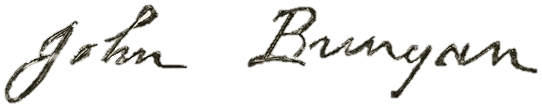

John Bunyan (/ˈbʌnjən/; 1628 – 31 August 1688) was an English writer and nonconformist preacher. He is best remembered as the author of the Christian allegory The Pilgrim's Progress, which also became an influential literary model. In addition to The Pilgrim's Progress, Bunyan wrote nearly sixty titles, many of them expanded sermons.

Bunyan came from the village of Elstow, near Bedford. He had some schooling and, at the age of sixteen, joined the Parliamentary Army at Newport Pagnell during the first stage of the English Civil War. After three years in the army, he returned to Elstow and took up the trade of tinker, which he had learned from his father. He became interested in religion after his marriage, attending first the parish church and then joining the Bedford Meeting, a nonconformist group in St John's church in Bedford, and later became a preacher. After the restoration of the monarchy in 1660, when the freedom of nonconformists was curtailed, Bunyan was arrested and spent the next twelve years in prison because he refused to give up preaching. During this time, he wrote a spiritual autobiography, Grace Abounding to the Chief of Sinners, and began work on his most famous book, The Pilgrim's Progress.

Bunyan's later years, following release from a further six-month imprisonment, were spent in relative comfort and he continued to be a popular author and preacher, and was the pastor of the Bedford Meeting. He died aged 59 after falling ill on a journey to London and is buried in Bunhill Fields. The Pilgrim's Progress became one of the most published books in the English language; 1,300 editions having been printed by 1938, 250 years after the author's death.

Bunyan is remembered in the Church of England with a Lesser Festival on 30 August. Some other churches of the Anglican Communion, such as the Anglican Church of Australia, honour him on the day of his death (31 August).

== Biography ==
=== Early life ===
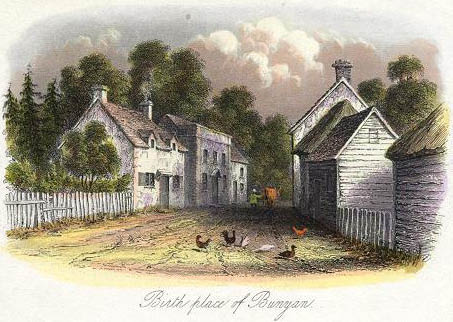
Bunyan's High Street cottage in Elstow

John Bunyan was born in 1628 to Thomas and Margaret Bunyan at Bunyan's End in the parish of Elstow, Bedfordshire. Bunyan's End is about halfway between the hamlet of Harrowden, (one mile south-east of Bedford) and Elstow High Street. Bunyan's exact date of birth is not known, but he was baptised on 30 November 1628, the baptismal entry in the parish register reading "John the sonne of Thomas Bunnion Jun., the 30 November". The name Bunyan was spelt in many ways (there are 34 variants in Bedfordshire Record Office) and probably had its origins in the Norman-French name Buignon. There had been Bunyans in Bedfordshire since at least 1199.

Bunyan's father was a brazier or tinker who travelled around the area mending pots and pans, and his grandfather Thomas served as a member of the Elstow Manor court and was a chapman (or small trader). Thomas Bunyan had, until his later years, owned land and properties in Elstow, so Bunyan's origins were not quite as humble as one might assume from his autobiographical work Grace Abounding to the Chief of Sinners where he wrote that his father's house was "of that rank that is meanest and most despised in the country".

As a child, Bunyan learned his father's trade of tinker and was given some schooling but it is not known which school he attended. It may have been at Houghton Conquest or Bedford Grammar. In Grace Abounding, Bunyan recorded few details of his upbringing, but he did note how he picked up the habit of swearing (from his father), suffered from nightmares, and read the popular stories of the day in cheap chap-books. In the summer of 1644 Bunyan lost both his mother and his sister Margaret. That autumn, shortly before or after his sixteenth birthday, Bunyan enlisted in the Parliamentary army when an edict demanded 225 recruits from the town of Bedford. There are few details available about his military service, which took place during the first stage of the English Civil War. A muster roll for the garrison of Newport Pagnell shows him as private "John Bunnian". In Grace Abounding, he recounted an incident from this time, as evidence of the grace of God:

When I was a Souldier, I, with others, were drawn out to go to such a place to besiege it; But when I was just ready to go, one of the company desired to go in my room, to which, when I had consented, he took my place; and coming to the siege, as he stood Sentinel, he was shot into the head with a Musket bullet and died.

Bunyan's army service provided him with a knowledge of military language which he then used in his book The Holy War, and also exposed him to the ideas of the various religious sects and radical groups he came across in Newport Pagnell. The garrison town also gave him opportunities to indulge in the sort of behaviour he would later confess to in Grace Abounding: "So that until I came to the state of Marriage, I was the very ringleader of all the Youth that kept me company, in all manner of vice and ungodliness". Bunyan spent nearly three years in the army, leaving in 1647 to return to Elstow and his trade as a tinker. His father had remarried and had more children and Bunyan moved from Bunyan's End to a cottage in Elstow High Street.

=== Marriage and conversion ===
Within two years of leaving the army, Bunyan married. The name of his wife and the exact date of his marriage are not known, but Bunyan did recall that his wife, a pious young woman, brought with her into the marriage two books that she had inherited from her father: Arthur Dent's Plain Man's Pathway to Heaven and Lewis Bayly's Practice of Piety. He also recalled that, apart from these two books, the newly-weds possessed little: "not having so much household-stuff as a Dish or a Spoon betwixt us both". The couple's first daughter, Mary, was born in 1650, and it soon became apparent that she was blind. They would have three more children, Elizabeth, Thomas and John.

By his own account, Bunyan had as a youth enjoyed bell-ringing, dancing and playing games including on Sunday, which was forbidden by the Puritans, who held a particularly high view of Sunday, called the Lord's Day. One Sunday, the Rev'd Christopher Hall, vicar of Elstow, preached a sermon against Sabbath breaking and Bunyan took this sermon to heart. That afternoon, as he was playing tip-cat (a game in which a small piece of wood is hit with a stick) on Elstow village green, he heard a voice from the heavens in his soul "Wilt thou leave thy sins, and go to Heaven? Or have thy sins, and go to Hell?" and thought he could feel Jesus Christ looking down from Heaven rebuking him. The next few years were a time of intense spiritual conflict for Bunyan as he struggled with his doubts and fears over religion and guilt over what he saw as his state of sin. He described how he developed a fear of bell-ringing: "I would go to the steeple-house and look on, though I durst not ring . . . but quickly after I began to think how if one of the bells should fall?" He was later unable even to approach the steeple door of the church "for fear the steeple should fall upon my head."

During this time Bunyan, whilst on his travels as a tinker, happened to be in Bedford when he passed a group of women on a doorstep, talking about spiritual matters. The women were some of the founding members of the Bedford Free Church (or Bedford Meeting) and Bunyan, who had been attending the parish church of Elstow, was so impressed by their talk that he joined their church. At that time the nonconformist group was meeting in St John's church in Bedford under the leadership of former Royalist army officer John Gifford. At the instigation of other members of the congregation Bunyan began to preach, both in the church and to groups of people in the surrounding countryside. In 1656, having by this time moved his family to St Cuthbert's Street in Bedford, he published his first book, Gospel Truths Opened, which was inspired by a dispute with Ranters and Quakers.

In 1658 Bunyan's wife died, leaving him with four young children, one of them being blind. A year later he married an eighteen-year-old woman named Elizabeth.

=== Imprisonment ===
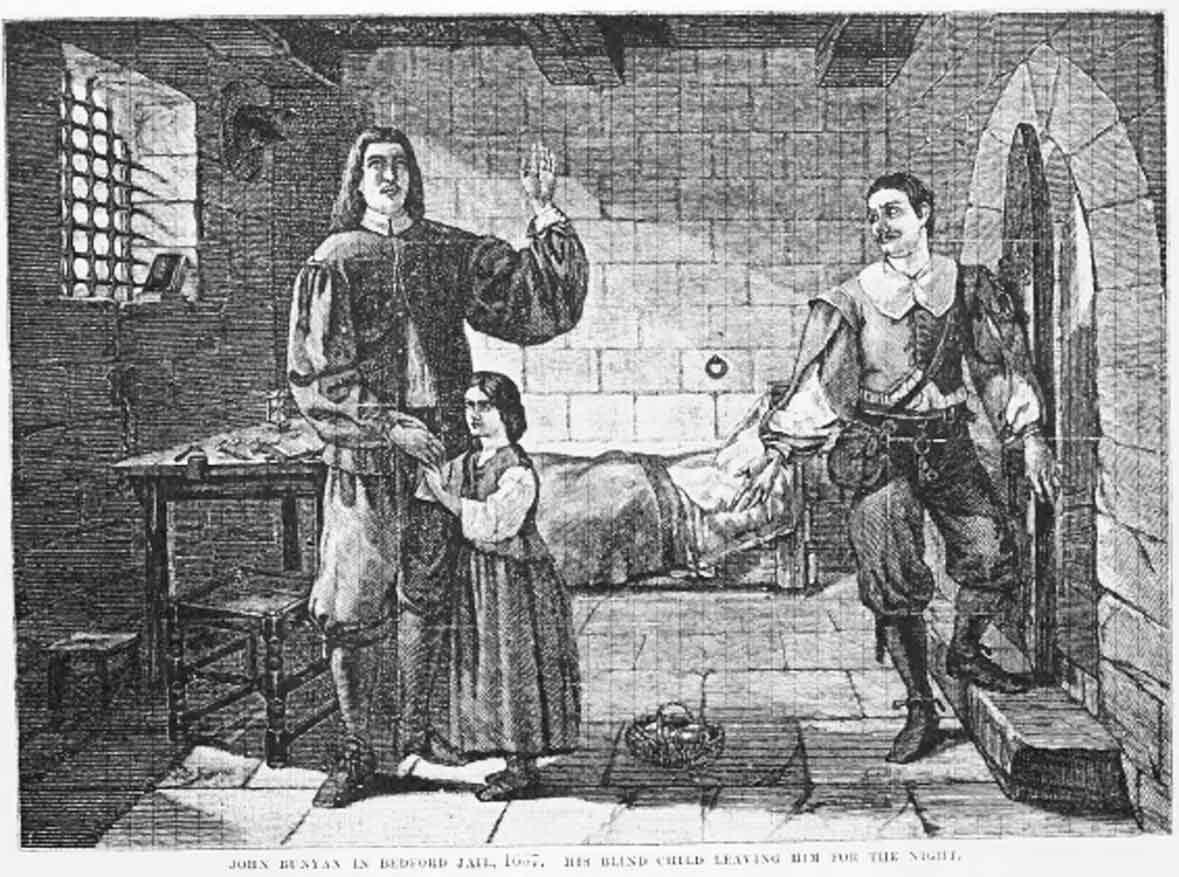
Bunyan in prison, as imagined in 1881

The religious tolerance which had allowed Bunyan the freedom to preach became curtailed with the restoration of the monarchy in 1660. The members of the Bedford Meeting were no longer able to meet in St John's church, which they had been sharing with the Anglican congregation. That November, Bunyan was preaching at Lower Samsell, a farm near the village of Harlington, thirteen miles from Bedford, when he was warned that a warrant was out for his arrest. Deciding not to make an escape, he was arrested and brought before the local magistrate Sir Francis Wingate, at Harlington House. Bunyan was arrested under the Religion Act 1592, which made it an offence to attend a religious gathering other than at the parish church with more than five people outside their family. The offence was punishable by 3 months' imprisonment followed by banishment or execution if the person then failed to promise not to re-offend. The Act had been little used, and Bunyan's arrest was probably due in part to concerns that non-conformist religious meetings were being held as a cover for people plotting against the king (although this was not the case with Bunyan's meetings). The Act of Uniformity, which made it compulsory for preachers to be ordained by an Anglican bishop and for the revised Book of Common Prayer to be used in church services, was still two years away, and the Act of Conventicles, which made it illegal to hold religious meetings of five or more people outside the Church of England, was not passed until 1664.

The trial of Bunyan took place in January 1661 at the quarter sessions in Bedford, before a group of magistrates under John Kelynge, who would later help to draw up the Act of Uniformity. Bunyan, who had been held in prison since his arrest, was indicted of having "devilishly and perniciousy abstained from coming to church to hear divine service" and having held "several unlawful meetings and conventicles, to the great disturbance and distraction of the good subjects of this kingdom". He was sentenced to three months' imprisonment with transportation to follow if at the end of this time he did not agree to attend the parish church and desist from preaching.

As Bunyan refused to agree to give up preaching, his period of imprisonment eventually extended to 12 years and brought great hardship to his family. Elizabeth, who made strenuous attempts to obtain his release, had been pregnant when her husband was arrested and she subsequently gave birth prematurely to a still-born child. Left to bring up four step-children, one of whom was blind, she had to rely on the charity of Bunyan's fellow members of the Bedford Meeting and other supporters and on what little her husband could earn in gaol by making shoelaces. But Bunyan remained resolute: "O I saw in this condition I was a man who was pulling down his house upon the head of his Wife and Children; yet thought I, I must do it, I must do it".

Bunyan spent his 12 years' imprisonment in Bedford County Gaol, which stood on the corner of the High Street and Silver Street. There were, however, occasions when he was allowed out of prison, depending on the gaolers and the mood of the authorities at the time, and he was able to attend the Bedford Meeting and even to preach. His daughter Sarah was born during his imprisonment (the other child of his second marriage, Joseph, was born after his release in 1672).

In prison, Bunyan had a copy of the Bible and of John Foxe's Book of Martyrs, as well as writing materials. He also had at times the company of other preachers who had been imprisoned. It was in Bedford Gaol that he wrote Grace Abounding and started work on The Pilgrim's Progress, as well as penning several tracts that may have brought him a little money. In 1671, while still in prison, he was chosen as pastor of the Bedford Meeting. By that time there was a mood of increasing religious toleration in the country and in March 1672 the king issued a declaration of indulgence which suspended penal laws against nonconformists. Thousands of nonconformists were released from prison, amongst them Bunyan and five of his fellow inmates of Bedford Gaol; Bunyan was freed in May 1672 and immediately obtained a licence to preach under the declaration of indulgence.

=== Later life ===
Following his release from prison in 1672 Bunyan probably did not return to his former occupation of a tinker. Instead, he devoted his time to writing and preaching. He continued as pastor of the Bedford Meeting and traveled over Bedfordshire and adjoining counties on horseback to preach, becoming known affectionately as "Bishop Bunyan". His preaching also took him to London, where Lord Mayor Sir John Shorter became a friend and presented him with a silver-mounted walking stick. The Pilgrim's Progress was published in 1678 by Nathaniel Ponder and immediately became popular, though probably making more money for its publisher than for its author.

Two events marred Bunyan's life during the later 1670s. Firstly, he became embroiled in a scandal concerning a young woman called Agnes Beaumont. When going to preach in Gamlingay in 1674 he allowed Beaumont, a member of the Bedford Meeting, to ride pillion on his horse, much to the anger of her father, who then died suddenly. His daughter was initially suspected of poisoning him, though the coroner found he had died of natural causes. Secondly, in April 1675, the Bishop of Lincoln obtained a writ de excommunicato capiendo against Bunyan for having failed to attend the parish church and take communion. This led to his arrest in December 1676 and a further six months in prison.

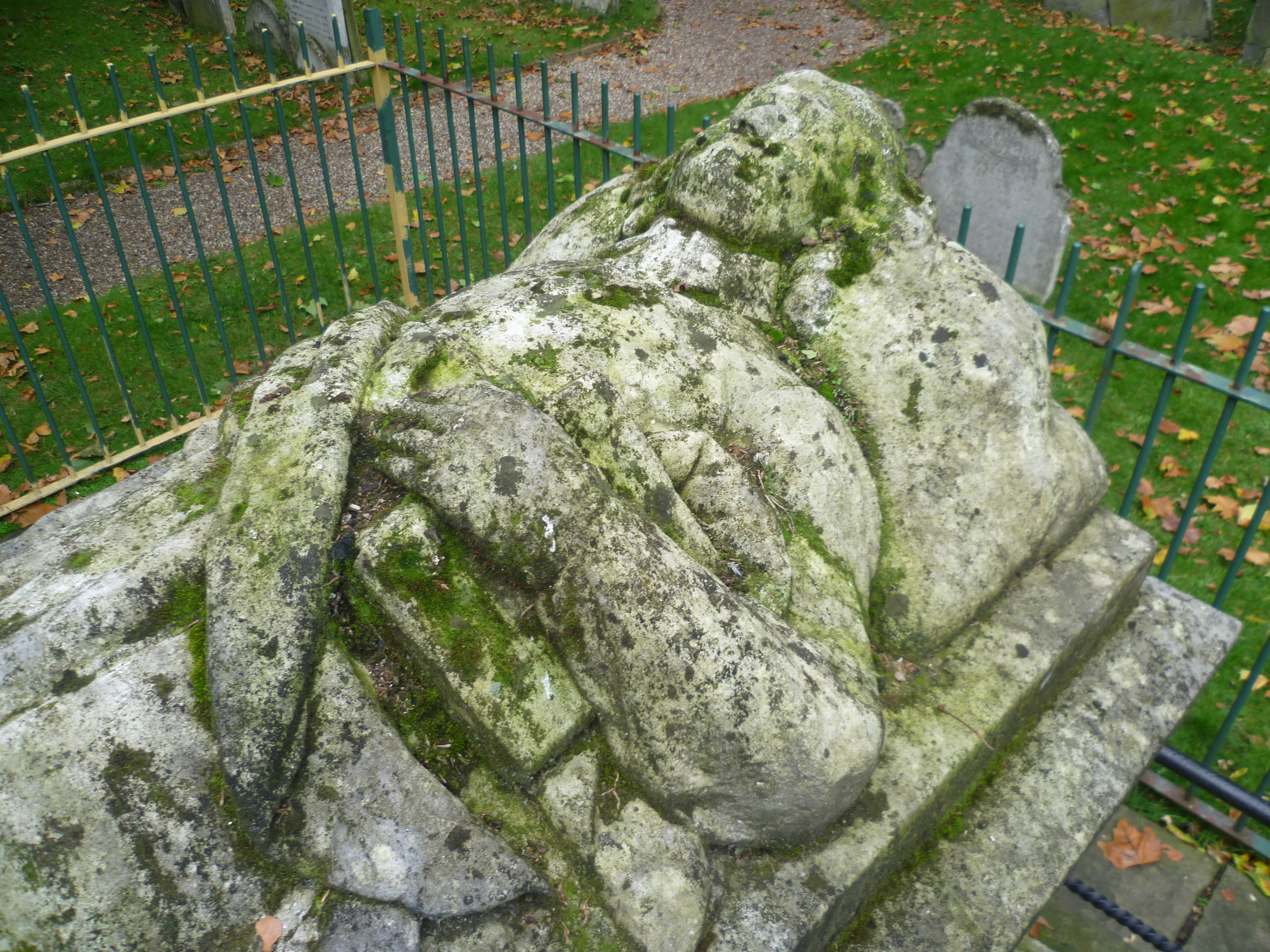
Bunyan's effigy on his grave in Bunhill Fields

In 1688, on his way to London to the house of his friend, grocer John Strudwick of Snow Hill, Bunyan made a detour to Reading, Berkshire, to try and resolve a quarrel between a father and son. Travelling on from there to London, he was caught in a storm and fell ill with a fever. He died in Strudwick's house on the morning of 31 August 1688 and was buried in a tomb belonging to Strudwick in Bunhill Fields – the nonconformist burial ground in City Road, London.

Bunyan's estate at his death was worth £42 19s 0d (about £5,200 in 2021). His widow Elizabeth died in 1691.

== Works ==
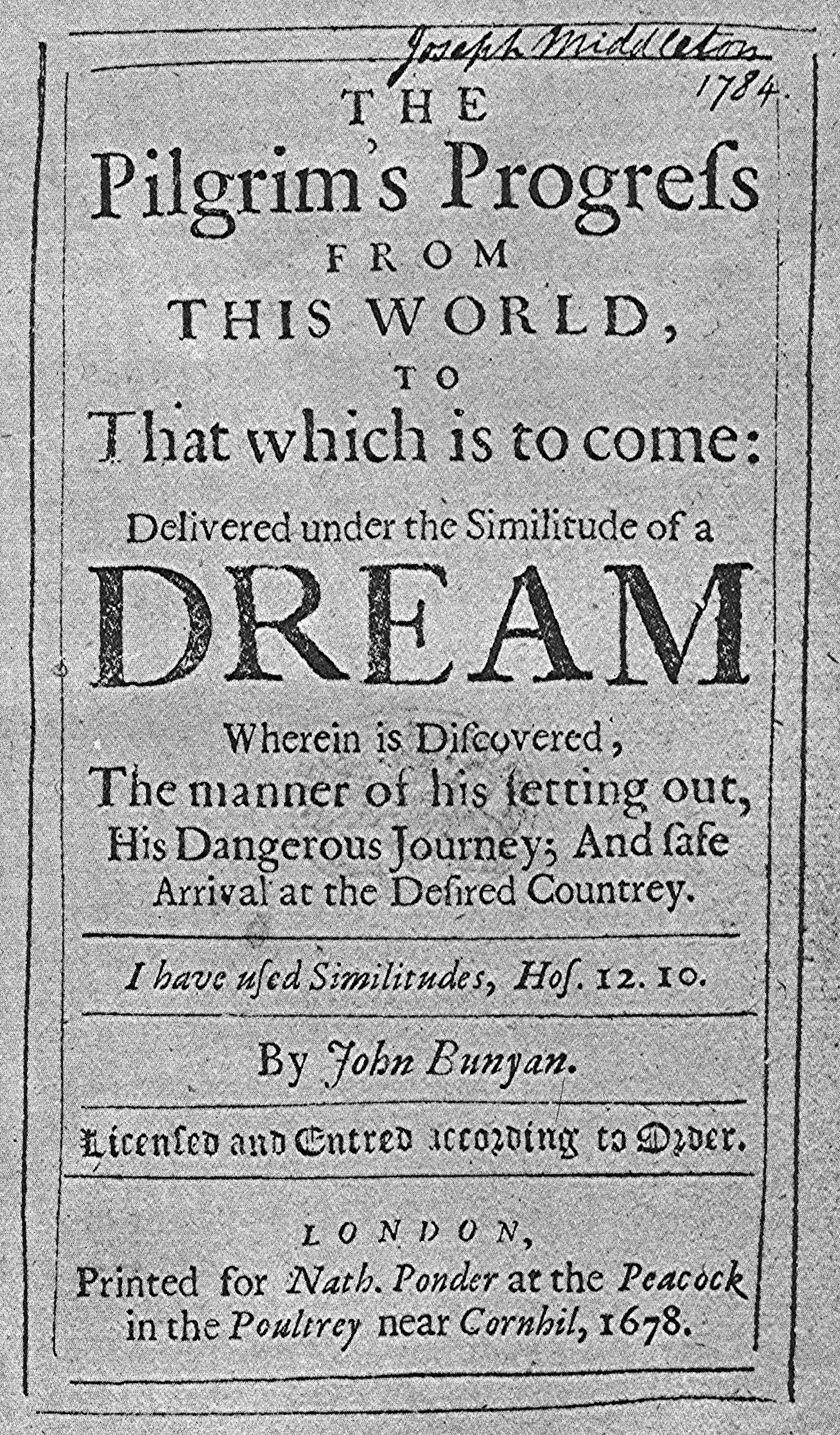
Pilgrim's Progress, first edition 1678.

Between 1656, when he published his first work, Some Gospel Truths Opened (a tract against the Ranters and Quakers—who at the time were somewhat indistinguishable), and his death in 1688, Bunyan published 42 titles. A further two works, including his Last Sermon, were published the following year by George Larkin. In 1692 Southwark comb-maker Charles Doe, who was a friend of Bunyan's in his later years, brought out, with the collaboration of Bunyan's widow, a collection of the author's works, including 12 previously unpublished titles, mostly sermons. Six years later Doe published The Heavenly Footman and finally in 1765 Relation of My Imprisonment was published, giving a total of 58 published titles.

Bunyan's allegory The Pilgrim's Progress, was completed during his second period of imprisonment but was not published until 1678. It was an immediate success, made Bunyan's name as an author and remains the book for which Bunyan is best remembered. The images Bunyan used in The Pilgrim's Progress are reflections of images from his own world: the strait gate being a version of the wicket gate at Elstow Abbey church; the Slough of Despond is a reflection of Squitch Fen, a wet and mossy area near his cottage in Harrowden; the Delectable Mountains are an image of the Chiltern Hills surrounding Bedfordshire. Even his characters, like the Evangelist as influenced by John Gifford, are reflections of real people.

Further allegorical works were to follow: The Life and Death of Mr. Badman (1680), The Holy War (1682), and Pilgrim's Progress Part II (1684). Grace Abounding to the Chief of Sinners, a spiritual autobiography, was published in 1666, when he was still in prison.

== Memorials ==
There is a small obelisk and an interpretation board marking his birthplace at Bunyan's End – in a field beside 'Bumpy Lane', which runs northwards from Old Harrowden Road.

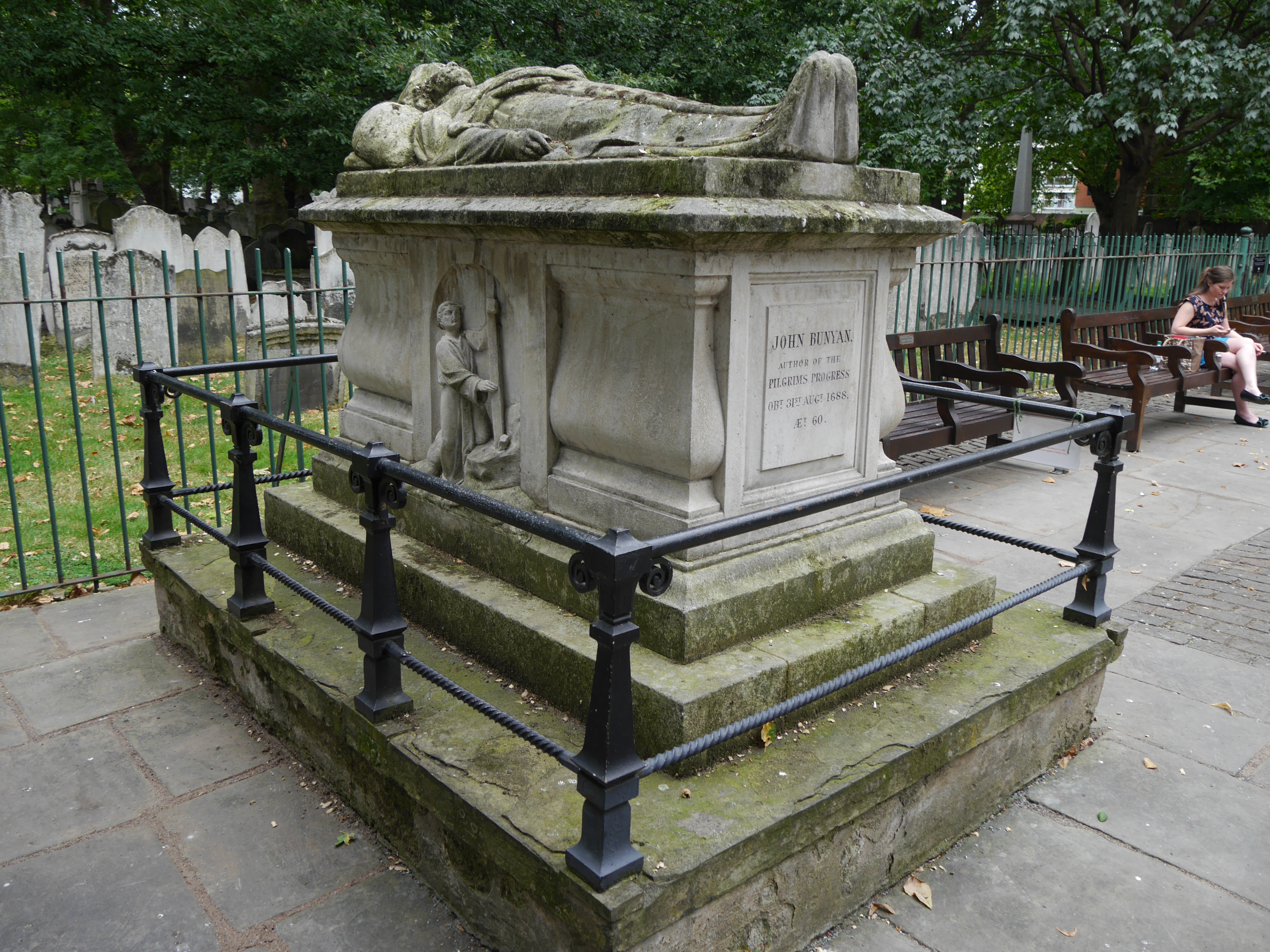
Bunhill Fields funerary monument

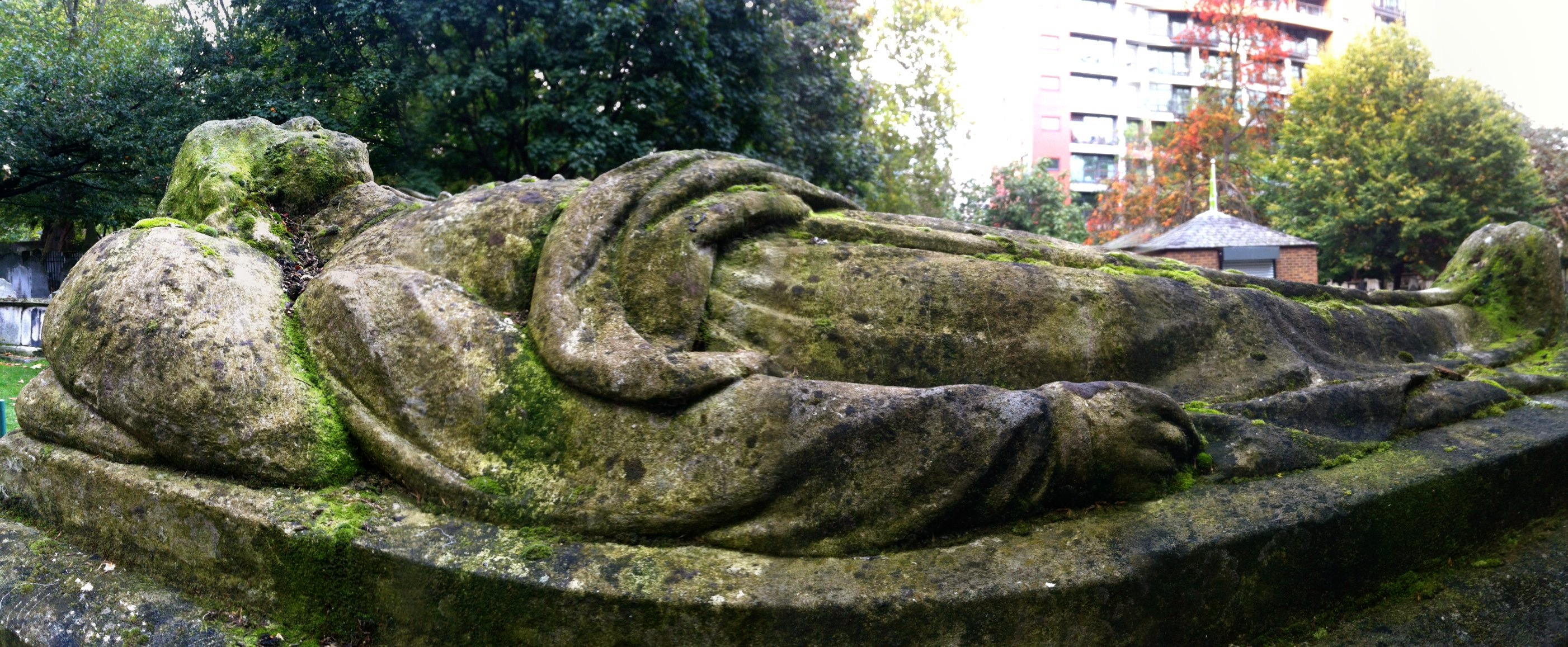
The effigy of author and non-conformist preacher John Bunyan on his tomb in London

In 1862 a recumbent statue was created to adorn Bunyan's grave; it was restored in 1922.

In 1874, a bronze statue of John Bunyan, sculpted by Sir Joseph Edgar Boehm, was erected in Bedford. This stands at the south-western corner of St Peter's Green, facing Bedford's High Street. The site was chosen by Boehm for its significance as a crossroads. Bunyan is depicted expounding the Bible, to an invisible congregation, with a broken fetter representing his imprisonment by his left foot. There are three scenes from "The Pilgrim's Progress" on the stone plinth: Christian at the wicket gate; his fight with Apollyon; and losing his burden at the foot of the cross of Jesus. The statue was unveiled by Lady Augusta Stanley, wife of the Dean of Westminster, on Wednesday 10 June 1874. In 1876 the Duke of Bedford gave bronze doors by Frederick Thrupp depicting scenes from The Pilgrim's Progress to the John Bunyan Meeting (the former Bedford Meeting which had been renamed in Bunyan's honour, and now houses the John Bunyan Museum).

There is another statue of him in Kingsway, London, and there are memorial windows in Westminster Abbey, Southwark Cathedral and various churches, including Elstow Abbey (the parish church of Elstow) and the Bunyan Meeting Free Church in Bedford.

Bunyan is remembered in the Church of England with a Lesser Festival on 30 August. Some other churches of the Anglican Communion, such as the Anglican Church of Australia, honour him on the day of his death (31 August).

== Legacy ==
Bunyan is best remembered for The Pilgrim's Progress, a book which gained immediate popularity. By 1692, four years after the author's death, publisher Charles Doe estimated that 100,000 copies had been printed in England, as well as editions "in France, Holland, New England and Welch". By 1938, 250 years after Bunyan's death, more than 1,300 editions of the book had been printed.

During the 18th century Bunyan's unpolished style fell out of favour, but his popularity returned with Romanticism. Many critics deem a turning point in Bunyan scholarship to be when poet Robert Southey wrote a lengthy appreciative biography in 1830 to accompany an edition of The Pilgrim's Progress. Bunyan's reputation was further enhanced by the evangelical revival and he became a favourite author of the Victorians. The tercentenary of Bunyan's birth, celebrated in 1928, elicited praise from his former adversary, the Church of England. Although popular interest in Bunyan waned during the second half of the twentieth century, academic interest in the writer increased and Oxford University Press brought out a new edition of his works, beginning in 1976. Authors who have been influenced by Bunyan include C. S. Lewis, Nathaniel Hawthorne, Herman Melville, Charles Dickens, Louisa May Alcott, George Bernard Shaw, William Thackeray, Charlotte Brontë, Mark Twain, John Steinbeck and Enid Blyton.

Bunyan's work, in particular The Pilgrim's Progress, has reached a wider audience through stage, film, TV, and radio productions. An opera based on The Pilgrim's Progress by Ralph Vaughan Williams, which Williams referred to as a 'Morality', was first performed at the Royal Opera House in 1951 as part of the Festival of Britain and revived in 2012 by the English National Opera.

John Bunyan had six children, five of whom are known to have married, of whom four had children. The Moot Hall Museum in Elstow has a record of Bunyan's descendants, down to the nineteenth century, although this record is incomplete.

The 81-mile John Bunyan Trail notes places in Bedfordshire associated with Bunyan.

== Selected bibliography ==
The best collection of Bunyan's writing is The Works of John Bunyan, edited by George Offor and published in London in three volumes between 1853 and 1855, containing 61 unique works. (A revised edition was published in 1862.) The misnamed Complete Works of John Bunyan, edited by John Gulliver and published in one volume by Bradley, Garretson & Co. in 1871, omits 28 works and lacks the biblical references and editorial footnotes present in Offor's collection.

Among Bunyan's many works were the following:

- A Few Sighs from Hell, or the Groans of a Damned Soul, 1658
- A Discourse Upon the Pharisee and the Publican, 1685
- A Holy Life
- Christ a Complete Saviour (The Intercession of Christ And Who Are Privileged in It), 1692
- Come and Welcome to Jesus Christ, 1678
- Grace Abounding to the Chief of Sinners, 1666
- Light for Them that Sit in Darkness
- Praying with the Spirit and with Understanding too, 1663
- Of Antichrist and His Ruin, 1692
- Reprobation Asserted, 1674
- Saved by Grace, 1675
- Seasonal Counsel or Suffering Saints in the Furnace – Advice to Persecuted Christians in Their Trials & Tribulations, 1684
- Solomon's Temple Spiritualized
- Some Gospel Truths Opened, 1656
- The Acceptable Sacrifice
- The Desire of the Righteous Granted
- The Doctrine of the Law and Grace Unfolded, 1659
- The Doom and Downfall of the Fruitless Professor (Or The Barren Fig Tree), 1682
- The End of the World, The Resurrection of the Dead and Eternal Judgment, 1665
- The Fear of God – What it is, and what it is not, 1679
- The Greatness of the Soul and Unspeakableness of its Loss Thereof, 1683
- The Heavenly Footman, 1698
- The Holy City or the New Jerusalem, 1665
- The Holy War – The Losing and Taking Again of the Town of Man-soul (The Holy War Made by Shaddai upon Diabolus, for the Regaining of the World), 1682
- The Life and Death of Mr Badman, 1680
- The Pilgrim's Progress, 1678
- The Strait Gate, Great Difficulty of Going to Heaven, 1676
- Good News for the Vilest of Men, or, A Help for Despairing Souls, 1688
- The Water of Life or The Richness and Glory of the Gospel, 1688
- The Work of Jesus Christ as an Advocate, 1688
- The Saint's Knowledge of Christ's Love, or The Unsearchable Riches of Christ, 1692

The Works of John Bunyan, edited by George Offor:

- The Works of John Bunyan: With an Introduction to Each Treatise, Notes, and a Sketch of His Life. Vol. 1. Blackie and sons. 1853.
- The Works of John Bunyan: Experimental, doctrinal, and practical. Vol. 2. Blackie and Son. 1861. Rev. Ed.
- The Works of John Bunyan: Allegorical, figurative, and symbolical. Vol. 3. Blackie and son. 1853.

Biographies of John Bunyan:

- Ivimey, Joseph (1809). The Life of Mr. John Bunyan, Minister of the Gospel at Bedford. Printed by R. Edwards.
- Wickens, Stephen B. (1853). The Life of John Bunyan: Author of The Pilgrim's Progress. Carlton & Phillips.
- Brown, John (1885). John Bunyan: His Life, Times, and Work. Isbister & Company.
- Deal, William (2001). John Bunyan: The Tinker of Bedford. Christian Liberty Press. ISBN 978-1-930367-59-3.
- Laurence, Anne; W.R. Owens; Sim, Stuart (1990). John Bunyan & His England, 1628–1688. A&C Black. ISBN 978-1-85285-027-2.
- Lynch, Beth (2004). John Bunyan and the Language of Conviction. DS Brewer. ISBN 978-1-84384-017-6.

Illustrations:

- "John Bunyan". The Illustrated Magazine of Art. 1 (5): 285–87. 1853. JSTOR 20537980.
- Smith, David E.; Griffin, Gillett G. (1964). "Illustrations of American Editions of 'The Pilgrim's Progress' to 1870". The Princeton University Library Chronicle. 26 (1): 16–26. doi:10.2307/26402925. JSTOR 26402925.

== See also ==
- English Dissenters
- "To Be a Pilgrim" – a poem from The Pilgrim's Progress which became a popular hymn. ("He that is down needs fear no fall" is another.)
- John Gifford (died 1655) – a spiritual advisor and predecessor of John Bunyan, and was also portrayed as "Evangelist" in Bunyan's The Pilgrim's Progress.
