= Arthur Saul (chess) =

British writer on chess and supposed spy (fl. 1614)

- Occupations: Writer on chess and supposed spy

Arthur Saul (fl. 1614) was a British writer on chess and supposed spy.

== Biography ==
Saul was described as a gentleman in April 1571, when he addressed to the Houses of Parliament a ‘Treatise showing the Advantage of the use of the Arquebus over the Bow in Warfare’ (State Papers, Dom., Eliz. xx. 25). In April 1617 he was a prisoner in Newgate, and made a deposition concerning his employment by Secretary Winwood and the archbishop of Canterbury to report what English were at Douay (ib. Jac. I, xci. 20). He was author of ‘The famous Game of Chesse play truely discovered and all doubts resolved, so that by reading this small book thou shall profit more than by the playing a thousand mates,’ London, 1614, 8vo; augmented editions in 1620, 1640, and 1672; dedicated to Lucy Russell, countess of Bedford.

The canon Arthur Saul was not his father, as has sometimes been claimed.
