= Thomas Barbar =

Thomas Barbar (fl. 1587), was an English divine.

Barbar was admitted scholar of St. John's College, Cambridge, 8 November 1560, proceeded B.A. 1563–4, M.A. 1567, and B.D. 1576, and was elected fellow 11 April 1565. He subscribed in 1570 a testimonial requesting that Cartwright might be allowed to resume his lectures. He became preacher at St. Mary-le-Bow, London, about 1576, and in June 1584 he was suspended on refusing to take the ex officio oath. The parishioners petitioned the court of aldermen for his restoration. In December 1587 Archbishop Whitgift offered to remove his suspension if he would sign a pledge to conform to the law of the church and abstain from conventicles. He declined to pledge himself. His name is attached to the ‘Book of Discipline,’ and he belonged to the presbyterian church at Wandsworth, formed as early as 1572. In 1591 he was examined in the Star Chamber with other puritan divines for having taken part with Cartwright and others in a synod held at St. John's College, Cambridge, in 1589, when it was agreed to correct and subscribe the ‘Book of Discipline.’ He is probably the author of a translation of Fr. du Jou's ‘Exposition of the Apocalypse’ (Cambridge, 1596), and of a ‘Dialogue between the Penitent Sinner and Sathan’ (London, without date).
