= Rottington =

Hamlet in Cumbria, England

Coordinates: 54.503335°N 3.6040023°W

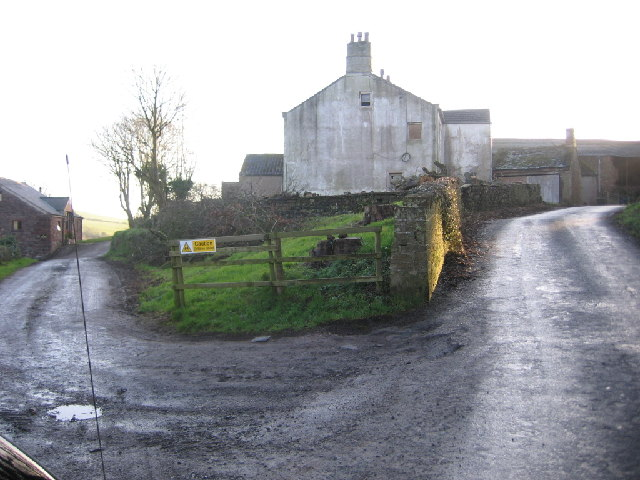
- Rottington Hall Farm

- Location in Copeland Borough Location within Cumbria
- Civil parish: St Bees
- Unitary authority: Cumberland
- Ceremonial county: Cumbria
- Region: North West
- Country: England
- Sovereign state: United Kingdom
- Police: Cumbria
- Fire: Cumbria
- Ambulance: North West

Rottington is a hamlet and former civil parish which is 3 miles (4.8 km) from Whitehaven; now in the parish of St Bees, Cumberland, Cumbria, England. It has a population of 51.

== History ==
The name "Rottington" comes from a farm or settlement connected with Rot(t)a. In 1762 the area became the property of Sir James Lowther. Rottington was a township in the parish of St Bees, in 1866 Rottington became a civil parish in its own right. On 1 April 1934 the parishes of Preston Quarter and Sandwith were merged into Rottington and Whitehaven. In 1961 the parish had a population of 92. On 1 April 1974 the parish was abolished and merged with St Bees.
