= Robert Hutton (footballer) =

English footballer

Personal information
- Full name: Robert Hutton
- Date of birth: 17 September 1879
- Place of birth: Sheffield, England
- Date of death: 1958 (aged 78–79)
- Position: Centre forward

Senior career*
Years	Team	Apps	(Gls)
1897–1898	St Andrew's (Sheffield)		
1898–1902	The Wednesday	5	(1)
1902–1903	Worksop Town		
1903–1904	Chesterfield Town	8	(1)
1904	Worksop Town		
Total		13	(2)
- * Club domestic league appearances and goals

Robert Hutton (17 September 1879 – 1958) was an English footballer who played in the Football League for Chesterfield Town and The Wednesday.
