= Mark Anthony Galliardello =

- Born: Italy (Venetian dominions; possibly Venice or Brescia)
- Died: June 15, 1585; London, England
- Occupations: Viol player, court musician, churchwarden
- Known for: Member of Tudor court consort; early violins in England; detailed church records
- Spouse: Margery Galliardello
- Children: Lucretia, Frances, Mark Anthony (died in infancy), Caesar
- Relatives: Nicholas Lanier (grandson)

Mark Anthony Galliardello, probably né Alberti (died 15 June 1585), was a viol player and member of the English Tudor court consort of instruments. Of Italian origin, he settled in London in 1545, remaining in the royal service for the rest of his life. As a conscientious churchwarden who compiled unusually detailed records, he is an important source for scholars of late Tudor church history.

== Life and career ==
Galliardello was born in Italy – in or near Venice according to one source; in Brescia according to others. In either case he was a subject of the Doge of Venice, Brescia being a Venetian possession in the 16th century. The Venetian dominions were at the time the centre of the manufacture of string instruments, and consorts of viols originated there, becoming established in the rest of Europe in succeeding decades. In 1542 Galliardello is recorded as being employed in France by the Cardinal of Lorraine.

In 1539 the French ambassador to the court of Henry VIII of England recorded, "The king … now gives himself up to amusement, going to play every night upon the Thames, with harps, chanters and all kinds of music and pastime. He evidently delights now in painting and embroidery, having sent men to France, Flanders, Italy and elsewhere for masters of this art, and also for musicians." Thomas Cromwell, charged with improving the music at court, recruited members of musical families from France – the Laniers – and from the Venetian empire – the Bassanos, Ferraboscos, Lupos and Albertis, the last of whom came to be known in England as the Galliardellos. Despite their Italian names, many of these families were of Sephardic Jewish origin, displaced from Spain or Portugal; is it not certain whether Galliardello's family, though certainly Jewish, was among them.

Galliardello entered the service of Henry VIII in May 1545. The ensemble that he formed with his fellow immigrants is believed to have featured the first violins in England. Galliardello settled in East Smithfield, part of a substantial immigrant community. By the accession of Elizabeth I he had married, and moved to Minories, in the City of London. His wife, Margery, gave birth to two daughters, Lucretia (1563) and Frances (1566) and two sons, Mark Anthony (1565) and Caesar (1568). The elder son died in infancy; the second followed his father into the court musical ensemble. A month before Caesar's birth, Galliardello was granted letters of denization as a royal servant, giving him many of the rights of English nationals.

Galliardello converted to Christianity, and became a devoted protestant. He is of importance to ecclesiastical historians of the period because of the unusually detailed records he kept as churchwarden of Holy Trinity, Minories. The historian Brett Usher writes, "His conscientious drudgery provides historians with vital clues to the development of nonconformist activity in London in the aftermath of the vestiarian controversy which divided the capital after March 1566." Galliardello became prosperous enough to contribute generously to church funds. and was praised as of "most good name and fame and godly report of all his neighbours".

Lucretia and Frances both married royal musicians, respectively Henry Troches and John Lanier. Frances's son, Nicholas Lanier, became the first Master of the King's Music.

Galliardello died on 15 June at Holy Trinity, where he was buried two days later.

== Sources ==
- Ashbee, Andrew (August 1994). "Review: Four and Twenty Fiddlers: The Violin at the English Court 1540–1690 by Peter Holman". Music & Letters. 75: 439–442. doi:10.1093/ml/75.3.439. JSTOR 737352. (subscription required)
- Crewdson, Richard (2000). Apollo's Swan and Lyre: Five Hundred Years of the Musicians Company. Woodbridge, UK and Rochester, US: Boydell Press. ISBN 978-0-85115-766-5.
- Holman, Peter (1982–83). "The English Royal Violin Consort in the Sixteenth Century". Proceedings of the Royal Musical Association. 109: 39–59. doi:10.1093/jrma/109.1.39. JSTOR 766135. (subscription required)
- Kisby, Fiona (May 1997). "Royal Minstrels in the City and Suburbs of Early Tudor London: Professional Activities and Private Interests". Early Music. 25 (2): 199–219. doi:10.1093/earlyj/XXV.2.199. JSTOR 3128517. (subscription required)
- Menpes, Dorothy (1904). Venice. London: A C Black. OCLC 1067411.
