= Arthur Dent (Puritan) =

English preacher and author (c. 1555–1607)

Arthur Dent (died 1607) was an English Puritan cleric, known as an author and preacher.

== Life ==
Dent was born at Melton, Leicestershire. He matriculated as a pensioner of Christ's College, Cambridge, in November 1571. He graduated B.A. in 1575–76, and M.A. in 1579.

Dent served as a curate for three years to George Withers, at Danbury, Essex. He was on 17 December 1580 instituted to the rectory of South Shoebury, Essex, on the presentation of Robert Rich, 2nd Baron Rich. In 1582 he was one of the witnesses examined in support of charges brought against Robert Wright, a Puritan minister. About 1584 Dent himself was in trouble with John Aylmer, his diocesan bishop, for refusing to wear the surplice and omitting the sign of the cross in baptism. His name is appended to the petition sent to the lords of the council by twenty-seven ministers of Essex, who refused to subscribe the declaration "that there is nothing contained in the Book of Common Prayer contrary to the word of God".

Dent died of a fever after three days' illness about the end of 1607. He left a widow. Ezekiel Culverwell, in dedicating an edition of the Ruine of Rome to Lord Rich, remarked on Dent's diligence. He was considered a good preacher, and his printed sermons ran to numerous editions.

== Works ==
- The plaine mans path-way to heauen : wherein euery man may clearly see, whether he shall be saued or damned : set forth dialogue wise, for the better understanding of the simple, London: imprinted for Robert Dexter, and are to be sold at the signe of the brazen serpent in Powles Church-yard, 1601. This was one of the two books that John Bunyan read before or during the four years of spiritual struggle that led eventually to his conversion, and his subsequent writing of Pilgrim's Progress. The other title was The Practice of Piety by Lewis Bayly. The work also influenced Richard Baxter, who recast it in 1674 as The Poor Man's Family Book.
- The Ruine of Rome. Or, An Exposition upon the whole Revelation. Wherein is plainly shown and proved, that the Popish religion, together with all the power and authority of Rome, shall ebbe and decay still more and more throughout all the churches of Europe, and come to an utter overthrow even in this life, before the end of the world. Written especially for the comfort of Protestants, and the daunting of Papists, Seminary Priests, Jesuits, and all the cursed rabble. London, 1607. Printed by W.I. for Simon Waterson and Richard Banckworth.
- The opening of heauen gates, or, The ready vvay to euerlasting life: Deliuered in a most familiar dialogue, betweene reason and religion, touching predestination, Gods word and mans free-will, to the vnderstanding of the weakest capacitie, and confirming of the more strong, by Aurthur Dent, London : Printed [at Eliot's Court Press] for Iohn Wright, and are to be sold at his shop at the signe of the Bible without New-gate, 1624 (fifth edition)
- Sermon of Gods prouidence. Very godly and profitable: preached at South-Shoobery in Essex
- Hand-maid of repentance. Or, A short treatise of restitution (As a necessary appendix to his Sermon of Repentance.)

Modern edition

- The Plain Man's Pathway to Heaven, ISBN 978-1-877611-69-8
