= Robert Howard Hutton =

Robert Howard Hutton (1840–1887), bonesetter, was born at Soulby, near Kirkby Stephen, Westmorland, on 26 July 1840. He was the son of Robert Hutton. He was a member of a family of farmers who for two hundred years had resided in the north of England. The family were bonesetters for the benefit of their neighbours. Robert's uncle, Richard Hutton, was the first of the family to make bonesetting his profession. He set up in practice in London at Wyndham Place, Crawford Street, London, and died at Gilling Lodge, Watford, on 6 January 1871, aged 70. Among the well-authenticated cases of cures by the elder Hutton were those of the Hon. Spencer Ponsonby on 27 June 1865, and of George Moore, the philanthropist, in March 1869.

The younger Hutton was from 1863 to 1869 at Milnthorpe in Westmoreland, where he farmed land and set bones. About 1869 he came to London, and resided with his uncle Richard. He then set up for himself first at 74 Gloucester Place, Portman Square, and afterwards at 36 Queen Anne Street, Cavendish Square. He soon obtained a name and a position. He owed his reputation to his mechanical tact and acute observation of the symptoms of dislocations. His general method of procedure was to poultice and oil the limb for a week, and then by a sudden twist or wrench he often effected an immediate cure. Hutton's extensive practice brought him a large fortune, but his tastes were expensive. He was devoted to all field-sports, and was well known as a huntsman at Melton Mowbray. He often set animals broken limbs. In 1875 Miss Constance Innes, daughter of Charles Leslie, was thrown from her horse and broke her arm. After many months, having, a permanently stiff arm, she went to Hutton. He restored it and on 26 July 1876 she became his wife.

On 16 July 1887, at 36 Queen Anne Street, London, a servant gave him some laudanum instead of a black draught. He died soon afterwards at University College Hospital. A verdict of death from misadventure was returned at the inquest. He left one child, Gladys Hutton.
