= The Holy War =

1682 novel by John Bunyan

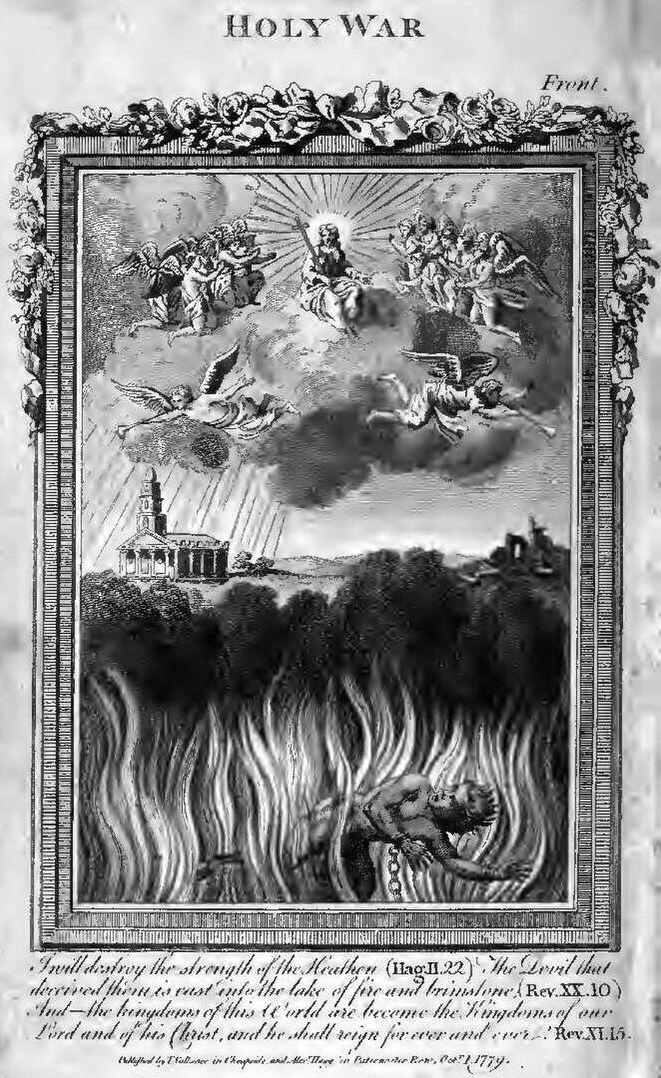
- Illustration from a 1782 edition
- Author: John Bunyan
- Language: English
- Genre: Novel
- Publication date: 1682
- Publication place: England
- Media type: Print
- Pages: 191

The Holy War Made by King Shaddai Upon Diabolus, to Regain the Metropolis of the World, Or, The Losing and Taking Again of the Town of Mansoul is a 1682 novel by John Bunyan. Regarded as one of the early modern English novel written in the form of an allegory, it tells the story of the residents in a town called "Mansoul" (Man's soul). Though the town along with its citizens is deemed perfect under the rule of Shaddai (Almighty), its citizens had been persuaded by Diabolus to rebel and throw off his reign, effectively crowning Diabolus as its ruler. During Diabolus' reign on Mansoul, Shaddai, seeking to restore his kingship, sends his son Emmanuel to reclaim it.

== Premise ==
In the city Mansoul, there are three esteemed men, who have lost their authority due to admitting Diabolus into the city. The mayor's understanding is hidden from the light. The recorder has become a madman, sinning at times and condemning the sin of the city. But worst of all is "Lord Willbewill," who no longer desires to serve his true Lord, but desires to serve Diabolus instead. With the fall of these three men, Mansoul will need to turn back to Shaddai of his own free will, which seems impossible. Salvation can only come if Emmanuel is victorious.

— Official novel blurb,

The city named as Mansoul has been regarded as perfect under the rule of Shaddai for a long time. One day, three esteemed men, Lord Willbewill, Understanding, and Conscience, welcome Diabolus into the city. Diabolus with his charisma, eventually convinces Mansoul's citizens to overthrow Shaddai and name him as the ruler of Mansoul. While Understanding and Conscience regretting their actions, Lord Willbewill shifts his allegiance to Diabolus instead. Having concerns over his former citizens, Shaddai sends his son, Emmanuel, to Mansoul as an attempt to reclaim his rule over Mansoul.

== Characters ==
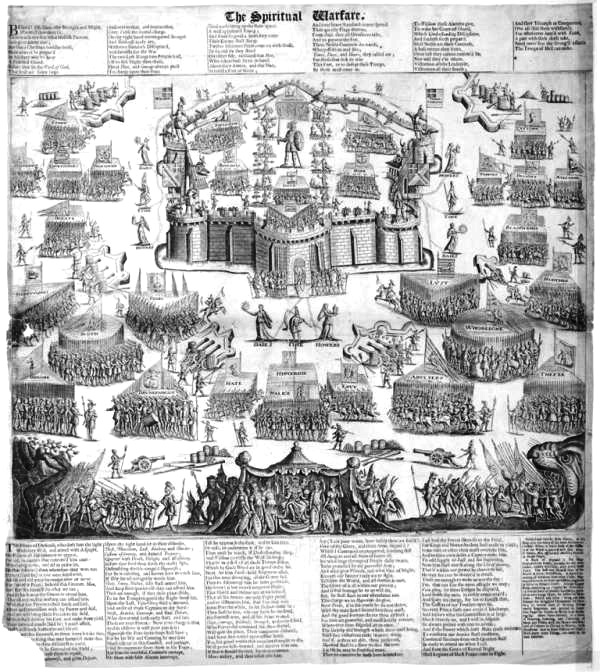
The Spiritual Warfare (c. 1623), a print by Martin Droeshout depicting the devil's army besieging a walled city held by a "Christian Soldier bold" guarded by figures representing the Christian virtues. It has been suggested that this print may have influenced Bunyan to write The Holy War.

Main characters:

- Boanerges: One of the four first Captains Shaddai sent to Mansoul
- Carnal-Security: An entrapping Diabolian, who convinces Mansoul to break their fellowship with Emmanuel after He saved the city
- Charity: Seventh Captain
- Conscience: The Recorder of Mansoul, who forgets Shaddai's law due to sin, at times, and other times laments the sin of the city
- Conviction: Second Captain
- Credence: Fifth Captain
- Diabolus: The deceiver who prompts the fall of Mansoul with lies, and fights against Emmanuel's conquest
- Emmanuel: Son of Shaddai and leader of the campaign to reclaim the city Mansoul
- Execution: Fourth Captain.
- Forget-Good: The recorder who works for Diabolus and despises the laws of Shaddai
- Good-Hope: Sixth Captain.
- Ill-Pause: A servant of Diabolus who slays Lord Innocency with foulness
- Incredulity: Friend of Diabolus and one of the two mayors during his rule. Incredulity escapes execution after the recapture of Mansoul and leads the army of Doubters against it.
- Innocence: Eighth Captain.
- Judgement: Third Captain.
- Lord Wilbewill: Servant of Shaddai at first but shifts allegiances to Diabolus when the city is captured
- Lusting: A Diabolian Mayor during the rule of Diabolus
- Patience: Ninth Captain
- Shaddai: The Sovereign of the Universe, as well as the creator and builder of Mansoul (El Shaddai, is one of the Judaic names of God)
- The Secretary: A Mansoul resident after Emmanuel's conquest who is deemed as "qual" to Shaddai and Emmanuel
- Understanding: Mayor of Mansoul who is unable to see the light because of treachery to Shaddai

== Locations ==
Some of the main places of The Holy War are listed below.

- Mansoul: The town, built for the glory and enjoyment of Shaddai, who in its wickedness forsakes their King for Diabolus.
- Eye-Gate: One of the most significant of the five gates entering into Mansoul.
- Ear-Gate: Also one of the most significant gates entering into Mansoul, it is the one which is first assaulted by Diabolus.
- Mouth-Gate: The Gate where proclamations are read and petitions sent.
- Feel-Gate: A weakly guarded gate where Diabolus sends the Doubters to attack after Emmanuel had reclaimed the city.
- Nose-Gate: The least of the five gates of Mansoul.
- Hell-Gate Hill: The place where Diabolus initially flees after losing possession of Mansoul.

== Reception ==
Critical reception to The Holy War has been mixed. Only two editions were published during Bunyan's lifetime, indicating that the work was much less popular than his earlier Pilgrim's Progress, which had run to eight editions in its first four years. Interest in The Holy War revived during the 18th century, although the text suffered at the hands of its editors, who were inclined to bring its ideas into a line with the prevailing theological climate. In 1854, Thomas Babington Macaulay asserted that The Holy War was "the second-greatest allegory ever written, surpassed only by The Pilgrim's Progress." Other 19th- and 20th-century critics have been more dismissive, and in modern times the novel is little studied in comparison with Bunyan's other works.

== See also ==
- Spiritual warfare
