= George Withers (archdeacon) =

George Withers was an English clergyman.

Withers was educated at St John's College, Cambridge, then incorpororated at Oxford in 1565. He held livings at Swaffham Bulbeck and Danbury. Withers was Archdeacon of Colchester from 1570 until his death in 1605.
