= John Pullain =

English churchman and poet

John Pullain (1517–1565) was an English churchman, a reformer and poet, Marian exile and Geneva Bible translator.

== Life ==
A native of Yorkshire, he was educated at New College, Oxford. He graduated there B.A. in 1540 and M.A. in February 1544. In 1547 he was admitted senior student of Christ Church. He made some reputation as a writer of Latin and English poetry, and became a frequent preacher and a reformer. On 7 January 1553, being then B.D., he was admitted to the rectory of St. Peter's, Cornhill, but was deprived of it on Queen Mary's accession; he then for a time preached secretly in the parish.

He joined friends in Geneva in 1554, and co-operated in the Genevan translation of the Bible. In 1557 he was secretly in England under the name of Smith, acted as chaplain to the Duchess of Suffolk, and held services at Colchester as well as in Cornhill. Stephen Morris laid an information against him before Bishop Edmund Bonner; he escaped again to Geneva, and was there on 15 December 1558, when he signed the letter of the Genevan exile church to other English churches on the continent, recommending reconciliation.

Returning to England on Elizabeth's accession, he was restored to St. Peter's, Cornhill, but almost immediately incurred Elizabeth's wrath for preaching without licence, contrary to her proclamation. Pullain's name, however, appears in a list of persons suggested for preferment in 1559. On 13 December in that year he was admitted, on the queen's presentation, to the archdeaconry of Colchester, and on 8 March 1560 to the rectory of Copford, Essex. He resigned his Cornhill living on 15 November 1560. On 12 September 1561 he was installed prebendary of St. Paul's Cathedral. As a member of the lower house in the convocation of 1563 he advocated Calvinistic views. He died in the summer of 1565. He had married in Edward VI's reign, but some of the relatives sought to deprive his children of his property on the ground that they were illegitimate.

== Works ==
Pullain contributed a metrical rendering of the 148th and 149th Psalms to the earlier editions of Sternhold and Hopkins's version (1549 and after). The latter psalm was printed in Select Poetry published by the Parker Society (ii. 495). He is known to have written other versa/but none of it has survived. Thomas Warton quotes as by Pullain a stanza from William Baldwin's Balades of Salomon (1549). John Bale assigns to him a Testament of the Twelve Patriarchs, a Tract against the Arians, histories of Judith, Susannah, and Esther, and a translation into English verse of Ecclesiastes, none of which are known to survive.
