= Robert Hutton (divine) =

English cleric (died 1568)

Robert Hutton or Hutten (died 1568), was an English cleric and Marian exile.

Hutton was for some time at Pembroke Hall, Cambridge. William Turner, then fellow of Pembroke, says that Hutton was his servant there. He was probably Turner's scholar as well as servant, but does not appear to have taken any degree. During the reign of Mary he went abroad to escape persecution. Some time in Elizabeth's reign he was made rector of Little Braxted in Essex, and on 9 April 1560 became rector of Wickham Bishops in the same county. These preferments, together with the vicarage of Catterick in Yorkshire, he held until his death, which took place in 1568.

Hutton published The Sum of Diuinitie drawen out of the Holy Scripture …, London, 1548, a translation from Jonannes Spangenberg's Margarita Theologica, for which his patron Turner wrote the preface. The book was popular, and new editions appeared in 1560, 1561, 1567, and 1568. An edition of the Margarita in the original appeared in London in 1566.
