= Arthur Saul (canon) =

English Puritan cleric and academic

Arthur Saul (died 1586) was an English Puritan cleric and academic, a Marian exile and canon of Gloucester Cathedral.

== Life ==
Of Gloucestershire origin, Saul was admitted a demy of Magdalen College, Oxford, in 1545. He graduated B.A. in 1546, and M.A. 1549. He was fellow of Magdalen probably from 1546 to 1553.

In October 1553 Saul was expelled from Magdalen at Bishop Stephen Gardiner's visitation. Under Mary I of England he was an exile, and in 1554 was at Strasbourg with Alexander Nowell and others. Under Elizabeth I Saul was installed canon of Salisbury in 1559, of Bristol in 1559, and of Gloucester in 1565 (3 June); and was successively rector of Porlock, Somerset (1562), Ubly, Somerset (1565), Deynton, Gloucestershire (1566), and Berkeley, Gloucestershire (1575). He subscribed the canons of 1562 as a member of Convocation, but displayed a strong Puritan leaning. In 1565 he was appointed by Thomas Bentham, bishop of Lichfield and Coventry, to visit his diocese, and by Edmund Grindal in 1576 to visit the diocese of Gloucester.

Saul died in 1586. The Jacobean chess-writer Arthur Saul was not his son, as has sometimes been claimed.

== Notes ==
Attribution

This article incorporates text from a publication now in the public domain: Lee, Sidney, ed. (1897). "Saul, Arthur". Dictionary of National Biography. Vol. 50. London: Smith, Elder & Co.
