= Hubert McGoldrick =

Irish stained glass artist

Hubert Vincent McGoldrick (1897 — 22 November 1967) was a Dublin-born stained glass artist, one of a small number of Irish artists which included Michael Healy, Wilhelmina Geddes, Evie Hone, and Harry Clarke, who worked in this medium and achieved international recognition for their work in the first half of the 20th century. His career at An Túr Gloine spanned from 1920 until 1943; thereafter he produced very few works in the medium. Along with Ethel Rhind and Catherine O'Brien he was one of the artists at the studio who worked in opus-sectile mosaic, a side-line of the studio. Hubert McGoldrick was also an occasional illustrator and his most recognised illustration is the Magnificat Anima Mea Dominum created for the Legion of Mary.

== Early life and education ==
Hubert McGoldrick was the youngest of nine children. Around the time of his birth the family moved to a substantial red-bricked house in Rathgar, Dublin, where he was to live until his death.

McGoldrick is first recorded as having attended classes at the Dublin Metropolitan School of Art (now National College of Art and Design, Dublin, when aged thirteen. Two years later, in 1913, he joined Messrs Earley and Company of Upper Camden Street Dublin, a stained glass company which had been operating in the city since 1852.

During his apprenticeship he continued attending classes at the DMSA and under Alfred E. Child's supervision he executed a panel of his own design. In 1918 McGoldrick exhibited three designs for stained glass at the Royal Hibernian Academy Annual Exhibition, which may indicate that he saw himself as an artist and not as a typical Earley's worker who manufactured (albeit superior) windows to fairly standard stock designs and patterns.

Two years later, in 1920, he was invited to join An Túr Gloine at a stage when the studio was particularly busy undertaking commissions for war memorial windows. Hubert McGoldrick was the first male and the first Catholic to join the studio since Michael Healy's arrival some fifteen years earlier. Like Healy, he was a devout Catholic but in personality was very different; while Healy was reclusive and introvert, McGoldrick was theatrical and flamboyant.

== Stained glass career ==
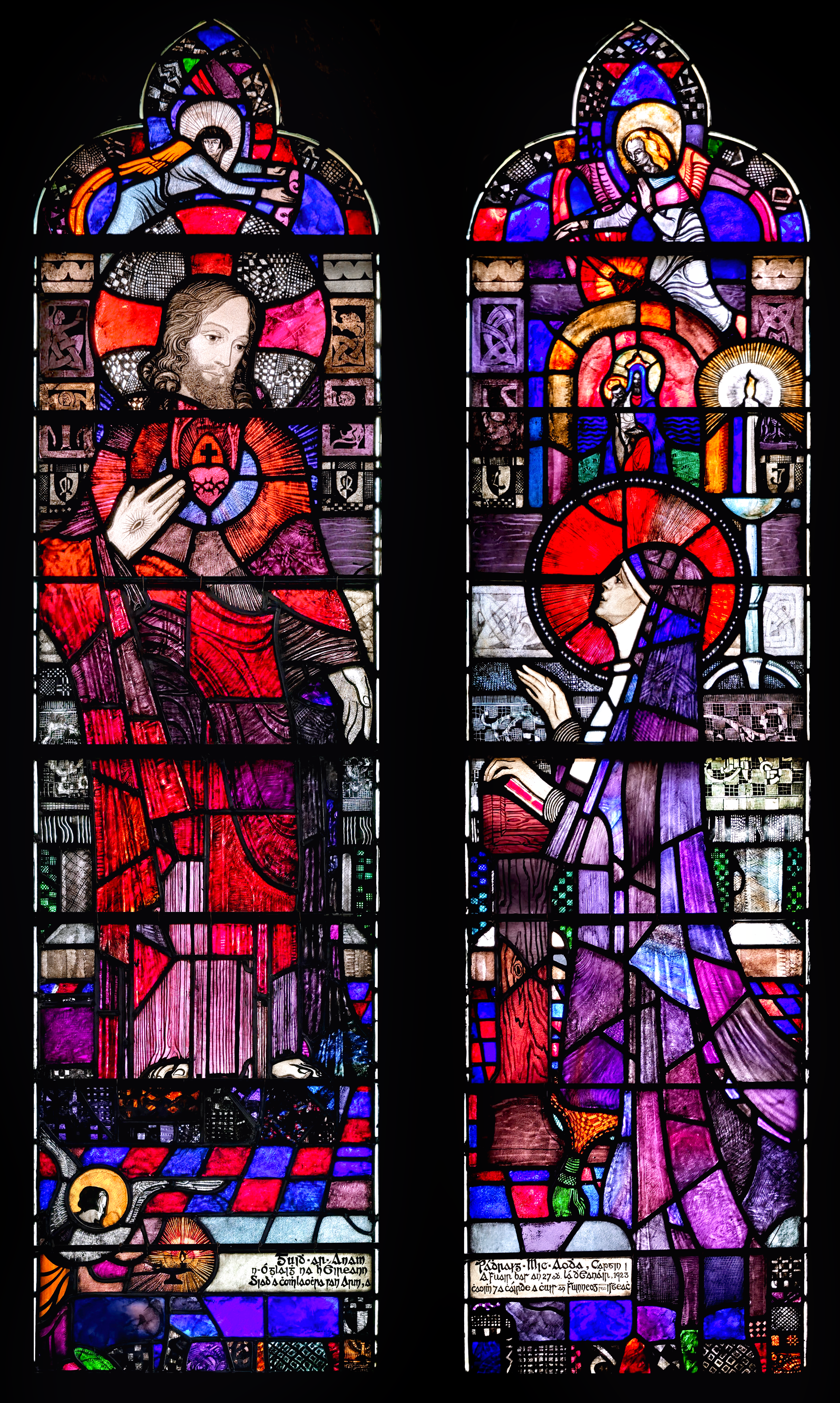
Two-light window Christ of the Sacred Heart appearing to St. Margaret Mary at St Brendan's Cathedral, Loughrea

Hubert McGoldrick worked consistently at An Túr Gloine from when he first joined in 1920 until 1943 when the artist and unofficial manager, Sarah Purser, died and reluctantly the two remaining artists, McGoldrick and Catherine O'Brien, decided to dissolve the cooperative studio; thereafter McGoldrick produced little stained glass. His first window, Sorrow and Joy, for Gowran, County Kilkenny, indicates a strongly developed personal style and choice of palette which would have been quite at variance to the prevalent house-style at Earley and Company from where he had come. Like Harry Clarke and Michael Healy he revelled in rich detail, particularly evident in his works of the 1920s. One of his finest windows was produced early in his An Túr Gloine career, The Sacred Heart appearing to Saint Margaret Mary, (1925) for St Brendan's Cathedral, Loughrea, County Galway; already by the mid 1920s this cathedral was well on its way to becoming a showcase for work by all but one (Wilhelmina Geddes) of the significant artists that worked at An Túr Gloine — and the Irish arts and crafts movement generally — and McGoldrick may well have recognised its potential as a premium venue to display his artistry. This window revels in warm colours and features little vignettes.

Perhaps his most outstanding window, and one of the most unusual commissions to come to the studio, was a massive lunette, The Spirit of Morning (1926—27), for a private home in Singapore, which following many years in storage is now on public display in the Penang Colonial Museum, Malaysia. Of all McGoldrick's works this one has the most sense of the period that it was created in, possibly since the secular subject matter allowed a more contemporary representation of womanhood. By this stage An Túr Gloine was receiving several substantial international commissions (championed in the U.S. by renowned Boston-based stained glass designer Charles Connick) and McGoldrick was among five other of the studio's artists whose work featured in the Chapel of the Sacred Heart, Newton Country Day School, Newton, Massachusetts which, unusually, featured only female saints, McGoldrick's being a rose window depicting The Sacred Heart (1927) and a three-light depicting St Margaret Mary (1927). In the 1930s another commission to fill an entire U.S. church with An Túr Gloine stained glass came to the studio, again for a secondary school chapel, this time for the Chapel of Brophy College Preparatory, Phoenix, Arizona and he depicted Symbols of the Blessed Virgin Mary; the burning bush and the lily among the thorns (1936). McGoldrick's final overseas commission was for a crematorium chapel in Karori, near Wellington, New Zealand; his Gethsemane (1939) was one of six An Túr Gloine created for this small chapel. In many of his later works such as those for the Catholic Church, Aughrim Street, Dublin, and Kimmage Development Studies Centre, Dublin he eschews the detail often prevalent in his earlier work for a simplified approach often using deep shades of blue and red and little aciding.

Worthy of note, is that alongside his stained glass career at An Túr Gloine, McGoldrick also worked in opus-sectile mosaic, a type of mosaic that does not ustilise the familiar tesserae but instead uses larger custom-cut pieces and in this manner resembles the structure of stained glass windows. His greatest achievement in this medium is a series of Stations of the Cross for the Catholic Church, Westport, County Mayo (1929–1931).

Additionally he was an occasional illustrator and his most recognised illustration, the Magnificat Anima Mea Dominum, was commissioned for the Legion of Mary by its founder Frank Duff and it was, and continues to be, widely reproduced in the organisation's literature. He also exhibited cards, block prints, poster designs and decorative painting on plaster at the Arts and Crafts Society of Ireland seventh exhibition in 1925.

The vast majority of McGoldrick's windows and works in opus-sectile mosaic can still be viewed in the churches for which they were commissioned. There is a collection of 35mm slides of his windows and work in mosaic in the National Irish Visual Arts Library, located in National College of Art and Design, Dublin.

== Stained glass catalogue raisonné ==
- Sorrow and Joy (1920). Church of Ireland, Gowran, County Kilkenny
- The Burning Bush, and heraldry (1920). First Presbyterian Church, Ballymoney, County Antrim
- Christ with angels and soldiers (1921). Church of Ireland, Castletownroche, County Cork
- Saints Martin, George, Michael and Paul (1921). Church of England (St Paul's), Askew Road, Gateshead, Durham, England
- St Brigid (1922). Catholic Church, Fairymount, County Roscommon, (remains in situ but radically altered prior c.1980)
- Michael (1922). Church of Ireland, Santry, Dublin
- The Baptism of Christ (1924). Catholic Church (St Patrick's), Lower Glanmire Road, Cork
- Sacred Heart appearing to Saint Margaret Mary (1925). St Brendan's Cathedral, Loughrea, County Galway
- The Spirit of Morning (1926—27). Penang Colonial Museum, Penang, Malaysia, removed from a private house in Singapore
- The Sacred Heart (rose), (1927). Chapel of the Sacred Heart, Newton Country Day School, Newton, Massachusetts, United States
- St Margaret Mary, (1927). Chapel of the Sacred Heart, Newton Country Day School, Newton, Massachusetts, United States
- The Good Shepherd (1928). Church of Ireland, Rathfarnham, County Dublin
- Phoebe (1929). Church of Ireland, Santry, Dublin
- The Good Shepherd, (1929). Catholic Church, Tullamore, County Offaly, formerly at Rathfarnham Castle, Dublin
- The Holy Family, (1929). Catholic Church, Ballylooby, near Cahir, County Tipperary
- The Stations of the Cross (in opus-sectile mosaic), (1929—31). Catholic Church, Westport, County Mayo
- The Good Shepherd, (1931). Church of Ireland, Kill-o-the-grange, County Dublin
- Mater Dolorosa and St James (1932). Catholic Church, Killorglin, County Kerry
- The Good Samaritan (1932). Church of Ireland, Kilfane, County Kilkenny
- Rex Regum and attendant angels (1933). Catholic Church, Valleymount, County Wicklow, (formerly in St Anthony's Catholic Church, Clontarf, Dublin)
- Decorative panels with Alpha and Omega (1933). Church of Ireland, St. George's Church, Dublin
- Crucifixion, with Blessed Virgin Mary, and Saint John (in opus-sectile mosaic), (1935—36). Catholic Church, (Christ the King), Turner's Cross, Cork
- St Brigid, (1936). Church of Ireland, Kiltennel, County Wexford
- Christ teaching in the Temple, with the diocesan arms of Armagh, the Bible, and the diocesan arms of Dublin (1937). Formerly in the Chapel of the Church of Ireland College of Education, Kildare Street, Dublin.
- Symbols of the Blessed Virgin Mary; the burning bush and the lily among the thorns (1936), Chapel of Brophy College Preparatory, Phoenix, Arizona, United States
- St Luke (1937). Church of Ireland (St Ann's), Shandon, Cork
- The Sacred Heart (1937). Chapel at Blackrock College, Blackrock, County Dublin
- Resurrection (three-light in Mortuary Chapel), (1939). Catholic Church, Aughrim Street, Dublin
- Crucifixion, with Blessed Virgin Mary, and Saint John (three-light in Mortuary Chapel), (1939). Catholic Church, Aughrim Street, Dublin
- A procession with two cardinals and St Dominic holding an image of Our Lady (1939). Dominican Church, Galway
- Gethsemane (1939). Crematorium Chapel, Karori, Wellington, New Zealand
- Saint Colmcille (1940). Kimmage Manor Chapel in Kimmage Development Studies Centre, Dublin
- Christus Salvator Noster (in opus-sectile mosaic), (1940). Church of Ireland, Clyde Road, St Bartholomew's Church, Dublin
- Our Lady of Lourdes (1940). Catholic Church, Swinford, County Mayo
- Christ the King (1940). Catholic Church, Swinford, County Mayo
- Annunciation and Crucifixion (two-light), (c.1944). Church of Ireland Church, Killiney, County Dublin
- The Risen Christ and Crucifixion (c.1953). Chapel of Muckross Park College, Ranelagh, Dublin
