= Michael Healy (artist) =

Irish stained glass artist

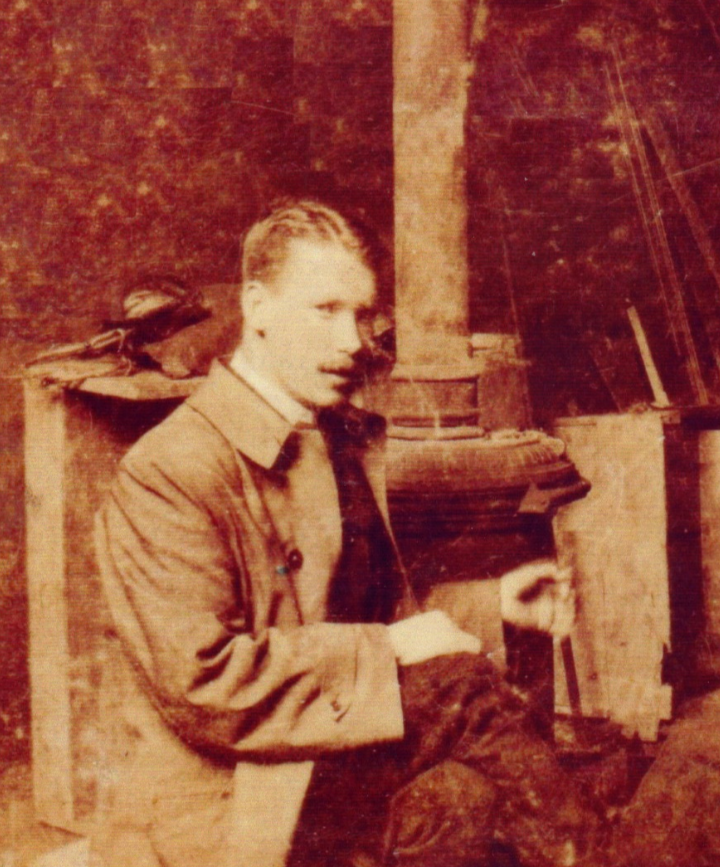
- Michael Healy. Year unknown.
- Born: 14 November 1873; Dublin, Ireland
- Died: 22 September 1941 (aged 67)
- Resting place: Mount Jerome Cemetery; 53°19′29″N 6°17′03″W
- Education: National College of Art and Design
- Known for: Stained Glass Art, Pencil Sketching, Painting, Watercolour Art

Michael Healy (14 November 1873 – 22 September 1941) was an Irish stained glass artist, one of a small number which included Wilhelmina Geddes, Evie Hone, and Harry Clarke, who achieved international recognition for their work in this medium in the first half of the 20th century. He also achieved some distinction as an illustrator and cartoonist early on in his artistic career, and as an ongoing recorder (in rapid pencil and watercolour impressions) of Dublin street characters going about their daily business. Healy also occasionally painted in oil, both portraits and landscapes, exhibiting a small number of the latter during his lifetime.

== Early life and education ==
Michael Healy was born in a tenement in Dublin's inner city and according to his friend of later years, C.P. Curran, "there was nothing in his parentage to turn him towards the arts, but nonetheless the child spent all his pennies on pencils and sat apart incessantly drawing" and by fourteen he was out in the world earning his livelihood. The first record of Healy attending the Dublin Metropolitan School of Art (now National College of Art and Design) occurs in 1892 when he was eighteen years old. Around this time he felt he had a religious vocation which led him to present himself as a postulant lay-brother at the Dominican noviciate in Tallaght, Dublin, but he left after about two years. In 1895 he reenrolled in the DMSA and remained a student (part-time) for three years. According to Curran, Healy's peers were struck by his capacity for drawing and he considered a career in book illustration. In 1897 he secured a job as an illustrator on a new Dominican publication, The Irish Rosary, and subsequently due to the good offices of the editor, Fr Stephen Glendon, he ended up travelling to Florence where he attended the Life School of the Accademia di Belle Arti for eighteen months, an experience that was to have a profound influence on his artistic development.

In the spring of 1901 Healy returned to Ireland and was appointed art master at Newbridge College, County Kildare, where he found time to paint some portraits, though by the end of 1902 he had resigned. As C.P. Curran noted, "I think he lived through some difficult days at this period before he welcomed Miss Sarah Purser's invitation to join An Túr Gloine." It was not until January 1903 with the official opening of An Túr Gloine that Healy's career really got underway; he was then in his thirtieth year and was about to discover his true vocation as an artist in stained glass.

In addition to Sarah Purser, the other artists at the fledgling studio were London-born Alfred E. Child (who also acted as manager) and Catherine O'Brien. Artists who subsequently joined An Túr Gloine included Beatrice Elvery, Ethel Rhind, Hubert McGoldrick, Wilhelmina Geddes, and Evie Hone. Michael Healy worked full-time at the studio from its establishment until his death in 1941 without interruption.

== Stained glass career ==
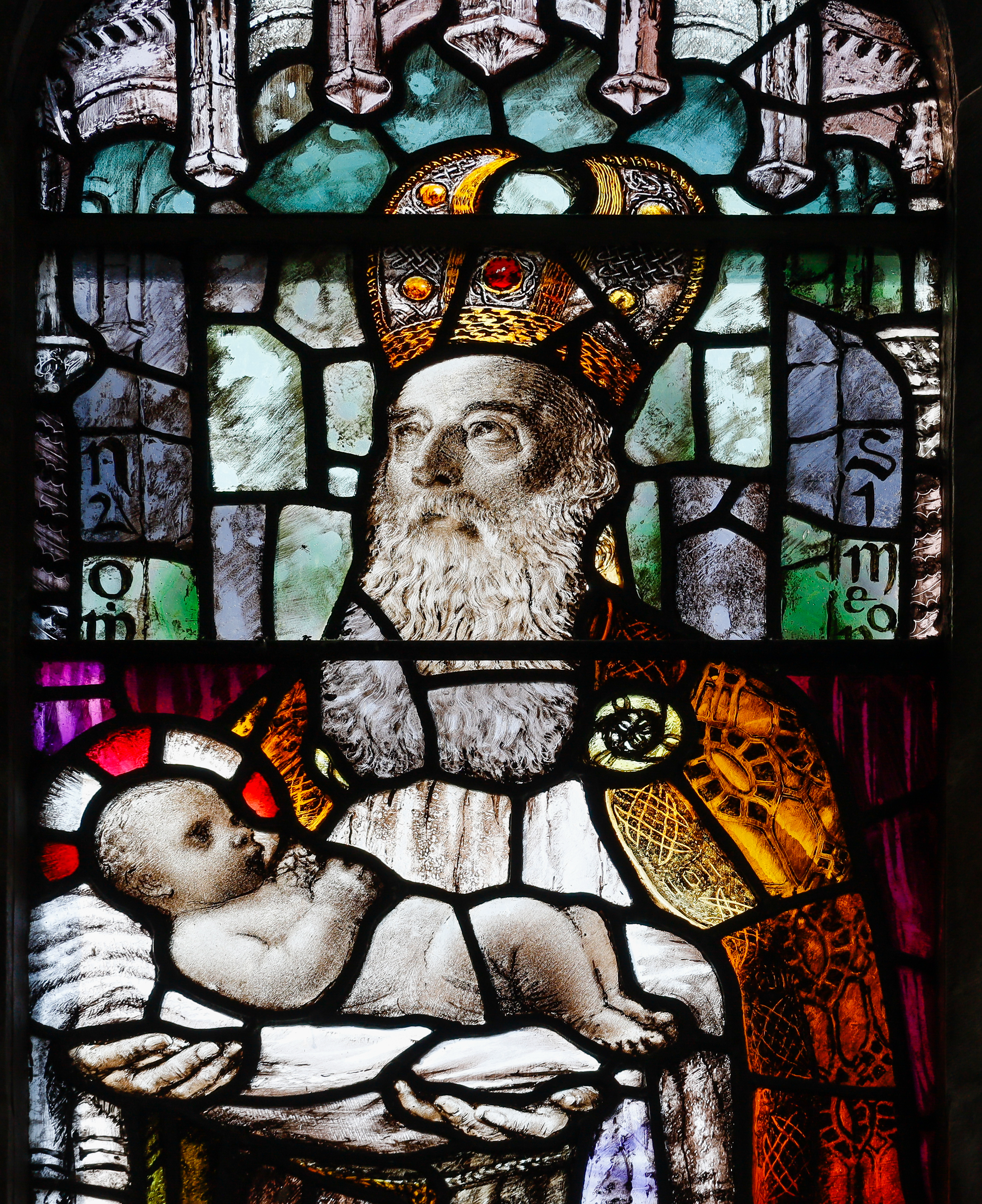
Detail of the Simeon window in St Brendan's Cathedral, Loughrea

The official start of Michael Healy's stained glass career coincided with the opening of An Túr Gloine in January 1903, and for the first two years he executed, or assisted in the execution of, a total of thirteen stained glass windows; in the case of the majority of these he assisted in the painting (often working alongside Catherine O'Brien) of windows which had been designed by Sarah Purser, Alfred E. Child, or Beatrice Elvery. The first two windows designed and painted entirely by Healy, Simeon (1904) and St John (1904), demonstrate his finely honed drawing ability and his natural affinity for the craft that would ensure he would soon eclipse his teacher (Alfred E. Child) and his peers. By 1906 Healy had all but ceased to assist in the painting of windows by other artists at the studio and between that year and 1909 he designed fourteen windows himself. Initially he was only assigned small single-light windows but by 1907 he was entrusted with two small rose windows for the side chapels of St Brendan's Cathedral, Loughrea, County Galway (where his Simeon had already been installed, and which would ultimately become a showcase for some of his finest work), and by 1908 five of his six windows were two-light commissions. In 1909, having proved his worth, Healy was assigned a large four-light window for the Church of Ireland, Rathmines, Dublin. This significant window, which features three saints he had already painted in stained glass, can be seen as the culmination of his first six years as a maturing stained glass artist.

Between 1910 and 1914 Healy executed fifteen works in stained glass, including two sets of door panels. Healy's first window of this period, the massive five-light Convention of Drum Ceat for the Cathedral of St Eunan and St Columba, Letterkenny, County Donegal, with its increased employment of the aiding technique and heightened palette, signals a new departure in Healy's stained glass oeuvre. His finest two windows of the period, both of which are two-lights and were executed in 1914, are St Helena and Constantine (also for Letterkenny Cathedral) and St Patrick blessing Saints Eithne and Fidelma, for the Catholic Church, Donnybrook, Dublin. Between 1915 and 1917 Healy executed eleven stained glass windows, all of which, with one exception, are of modest proportions. Particularly noteworthy is his Christ with St Thomas (1915) for the Catholic Church, Mayfield, Cork, which seems to capture a moment of suspended animation rarely seen in stained glass. Echoing his earlier representation of St Patrick (1914), Healy depicted Ireland's patron saint in sparkling golden vestments twice again in single-light windows destined for the Catholic Church, Ballyporeen, County Tipperary, (1916), and the Catholic Church, Glenariff, County Antrim (1917). Undoubtedly his finest work of this period is his impressive three-light for the chapel of Clongowes Wood College, County Kildare, which depicts three incidents (all nocturnal scenes) from St Joseph's life which occurred around the time of Christ's birth.

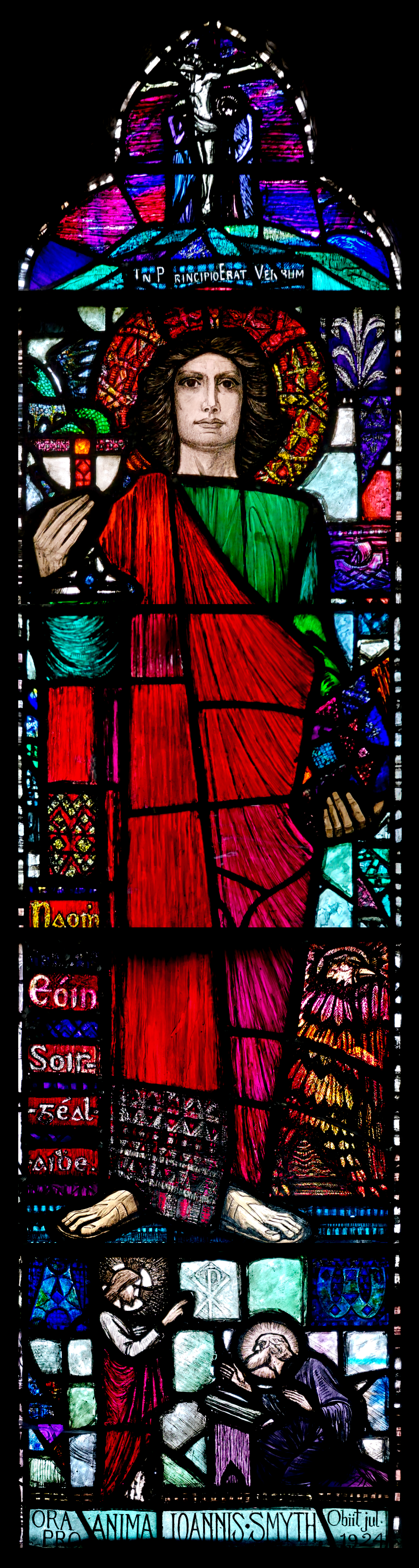
St. John the Evangelist at St. Brendan's Cathedral, Loughrea

It was only on the conclusion of the First World War that war memorials windows were commissioned from An Túr Gloine in significant numbers. Two artists at the studio appear to have specialised in this genre: Michael Healy and Alfred E. Child. The war memorial boom continued unabated into the 1920s and only began to subside post 1921. Between 1918 and 1921 Healy designed twelve windows, and six of these were war memorials. Probably the finest of these was for the Church of Ireland, Castlecomer, County Kilkenny. The commissions entrusted to Healy during the years 1922 to 1924 were diverse, and the calibre of design varied from the pedestrian to the sheer brilliant. The first pair of windows for the Catholic Church, Timahoe, County Laois, are disappointing, though they were immediately followed by two more stunning single-lights (for the Catholic Church at Bridge-a-Crin, County Louth, and the Church of St James and St Catherine, Dublin). Aside from small panels for Fr Glendon, Healy also painted three single-light windows which had been designed by Wilhelmina Geddes for Bardsea, near Ulverston, Lancashire.

The years 1925 to 1927 were particularly productive for Healy: twelve stained glass windows, part involvement in an important commission for Singapore (for Eu Tong Sen), and a small though prestigious presentation panel bound for the distinguished architect Ragnar Östberg in Stockholm. Significantly, one-third of the windows that Healy executed in this period were overseas commissions, and this was largely brought about by a burgeoning awareness and appreciation of Irish stained glass abroad, particularly in the USA. Five windows from this period were designed for the chapel of the Convent of Mercy, Ballyhaunis, County Mayo, and after it closed they were acquired by the National Gallery of Ireland where they are displayed in a specially designed room dedicated to Irish stained glass.

In spite of all the applause and congratulatory comment generated by An Túr Gloine's Silver Jubilee celebration, 1928 transpired to be a singularly disappointing year in terms of Healy's output. Two major commissions came to the studios, both of which were entrusted to Healy, and both of which did not proceed beyond the sketch design stage. Aside from completing his St Teresa window for the chapel at Newton Country Day School, Massachusetts, Healy is not recorded as having executed any stained glass windows this year. Between 1929 and 1930 he executed six windows, not including an heraldic work and several small panels. Two were destined for a chapel in Karori, New Zealand, and his most iconographically complex window, St Victor, was also executed during this period.

Healy's stained glass output in 1932 comprised two windows, a set of nine emblems for plain-glazed windows, and a few panels. One noteworthy commission came from the writer C. S. Lewis and his brother Warren for a window to commemorate their parents in the Church of Ireland St Mark's Church, Dundela, Belfast. Also, in May of that year Healy was assigned to oversee the production of an enormous American commission which occupied the entire studio staff for over a year which came via the renowned Boston-based stained glass artist, Charles Connick, for the Church of St. Vincent Ferrer (Manhattan). Aside from the American window, Healy only completed one single-light in 1931, the sumptuous Our Lady Queen of Heaven for St Brendan's Cathedral, Loughrea which pushed the aciding technique to new frontiers. Dominating the first half of the 1930s was his largest work, the majestic four-light depicting St Augustine and St Monica (1934–35) for John's Lane Church, (the Augustinian Priory) on Thomas Street, Dublin. In 1934 he began his fifth and final work for his friend Fr Stephen Glendon, by then posted to the Dominican Priory, Galway. A third apse window for the Church of Ireland at Billy, County Antrim, (near Bushmills), and a fifth nave window for St Brendan's Cathedral, Loughrea were completed by Healy in 1935.

Between 1936 and 1941, the year of Healy's death, he executed nine windows and a few small panels. Some of these, particularly the larger works, are difficult to date precisely and appear to have been executed over a number of years, in a few cases over a span as great as four years. Aside from his two overseas commissions, one destined for Karori, New Zealand, and the other for the chapel of Brophy College Preparatory, Phoenix, Arizona, Healy's output during this period comprises three distinct sets: a pair of three-lights, the Ascension and Last Judgement for St Brendan's Cathedral, Loughrea; a pair of two-lights for Blackrock College Chapel; and a trio of two-lights for Clongowes Wood College chapel. All nine of these windows number among the finest he executed in a stained glass career that spanned thirty-nine years, however the two that stand out are those for Loughrea Cathedral which are stunning in terms of technique and dramatic interpretation.

The vast majority of Healy's windows can still be viewed in the churches for which they were commissioned. Files on all windows designed or painted by Healy, along with 35mm slides taken in situ, can be found in National Irish Visual Arts Library, located in National College of Art and Design, Dublin. Additionally, an extract of his diary for 1916 which deals with the period of the Easter Rising and contains his first-hand observations and references the windows he was working on at the time is in the collection of the National Irish Visual Arts Library, Dublin.

== Stained glass catalogue raisonné ==
- Annunciation (1903); Agony in the Garden (1903); Resurrection (1903). All for St Brendan's Cathedral, Loughrea, County Galway (Designed by Alfred E. Child and painted by Healy).
- St Andrew (1903). Catholic Church, Ardrahan, County Galway (Designed by Alfred E. Child and painted by Healy).
- Simeon (1904). St Brendan's Cathedral, Loughrea, County Galway
- St John (1904). Catholic Church, Litter, Kilmuckridge, County Wexford
- St John the Evangelist, Madonna and Child, Cormac King and Bishop; with Coronation of Our Lady (1904). Catholic Church, Emly, County Tipperary (Designed by Sarah Purser and painted by Healy).
- The Good Shepherd (1904). St Columba's College, Dublin, Rathfarnham, County Dublin (Designed by Sarah Purser and painted by Healy)
- St Thomas, Christ and St Ronan (1904). Church of Ireland, Kilronan, County Roscommon (Designed by Alfred E. Child and painted by Healy)
- Our Lord and Blessed Margaret Mary (104-05). Convent of Mercy, Gort, County Galway (Designed by Beatrice Elvery and painted by Healy)
- Christ with Saints Philip and James (1905). Church of Ireland, Castlebar, County Mayo (Designed by Sarah Purser and painted by Healy)
- St Patrick (1905); St Brigid (1905); St Columcille (1906); St Beningnus (1906); St Benedict Joseph Labre (1906); St Anthony (1906). Convent of Mercy, Enniskillen, County Fermanagh.
- St Patrick (c. 1905–06). Sketch design for window which was not executed, for unknown church.
- Christ Lord of the World (1906). Catholic Church, Dysart, County Westmeath
- Saints Kevin, Columcille, Finbarr and Enda (1908). St. Francis College Rochestown, County Cork
- Virgin and Child with Saints Parick, Brendan, Brigid, Colman, Jarlath and Columcille (1906–07). St Brendan's Cathedral, Loughrea, County Galway
- Holy Family and six angels (1907) St Brendan's Cathedral, Loughrea, County Galway
- Dove (1907). Church of Ireland, Abbeyleix, County Laois
- St John & St Elizabeth with God the Father (1907–08); Ecce Homo with Mater Dolorosa, with Dove and Host (1907–08); St Peter and St Anna, with Lamb of God (1907–08). Catholic Church, Fairymount, County Roscommon
- St Anthony of Padua (1908). St Brendan's Cathedral, Loughrea, County Galway
- St Patrick and St Columba (1908–09). Church of Ireland, Magheralin, County Down
- Saints Philip, Peter, Paul and Andrew (1909). Church of Ireland, Rathmines, Dublin
- Convention of Drumceat (1910). Cathedral of St Eunan and St Columba, Letterkenny, County Donegal
- St Brendan ( 1910); St Jarlath (1910. Catholic Church, Fairymount, County Roscommon
- St Conaill Caoil and St Dallan Forgaill (1911). Cathedral of St Eunan and St Columba, Letterkenny, County Donegal
- St Hugh (1911); St Anne (1911). Cathedral of St Eunan and St Columba, Letterkenny, County Donegal
- Books, Scales of Justice, with Archangel Michael and dragon; Two angels at a saint's deathbed, with St Dominic (?); Lily with Blessed Virgin (c. 1911). Sketch designs for windows which were not executed which is in National Gallery of Ireland
- St Raymundus and St Antonius (1911). Dominican Church, Sligo
- David, Good Shepherd and St Peter (1911). Church of Ireland, Kilmore, County Monaghan
- Saints Marcatan, Brigid, Patrick and Dympna (1912); Oratory door panels (1912). Catholic Bishop's Palace, Monaghan
- St Patrick, St Peter and St Luke (1913). Church of England, St Peter's Church, Wallsend, Northumberland, England
- St Dominic receiving the Rosary, the Last Supper and the Sacred Heart (1913). Dominican Church, Dundalk, County Louth
- Sacristy door panels (1913). Dominican Church, Tralee, County Kerry
- St Helena and St Constantine (1914). Cathedral of St Eunan and St Columba, Letterkenny, County Donegal
- St Patrick baptising Saints Eithne and Fidelma (1914). Catholic Church, Donnybrook, Dublin
- St Patrick lighting the Pascal Fire on the Hill of Slane (c.1914). Cranbrook Academuy of Art and Museum, part of Cranbrook Educational Community, Bloomfield Hills, Michigan, United States
- Hope (1915). St. Victor's, Church of Ireland, Donore Avenue, Dublin
- Christ with St Thomas (1915). Catholic Church (St Joseph's), Mayfield, Cork
- Resurrection (1915). O'Shaugnessy Vault, Mount Jerome Cemetery, Dublin
- Faith, Hope and Charity (1915–16). Formerly in St James' Church, Dublin (Church of Ireland), James's Street, Dublin (location currently unknown
- St Patrick (1916), Catholic Church, Ballyporeen, County Tipperary
- A Rest on the Flight into Egypt, St Joseph and St Mary searching in Bethlehem, and St Joseph's Dream (1916). Clongowes Wood College, County Kildare
- Christ with Saints Martha and Mary (1916); Catholic Church (St Joseph's), Mayfield, Cork City
- St Brendan (c. 1914–16). Sketch design for Honan Hostel Chapel, Cork, though never executed
- Christ the King (1917).St. David's, Church of Ireland, Kilsallaghan, County Dublin
- St Patrick (1917); Christ appearing to St Peter (1917); St Brigid (1917). Catholic Church, Glenariff, County Antrim
- Blessed Imelda's Vision (c. 15–17). Sketch design for window for unknown church
- The Holy Women at the Tomb (1918), Church of Ireland, Lorrha, County Tipperary
- St Patrick and St Columba (1918). Church of Ireland, Castlerock, County Londonderry
- Angel and young soldier (1918), Gowran, County Kilkenny
- The Nativity, Christ blessing a woman, and the Shepherds (1919). Church of England (St Patrick's), Wallsend-on-Tyne, Northumberland, England
- St Dominc, Our Lady Queen of the Rosary, and St Catherine (1919). Catholic Church (Holy Cross), Dundrum, Dublin.
- St Brigid and St Patrick (1920). Clongowes Wood College, County Kildare
- St Christopher, Angel of Resurrection, and St Martin (1920). Church of Ireland, Castlecomer, County Kilkenny
- Angel and Knight (1920). Church of Ireland, Julianstown, County Meath
- St George, Angel of the Resurrection, and St Christopher (1921). Church of England (St Peter's), Wallsend-on-Tyne, Northumberland, England
- Christ walking on water (1921). Church of England (St Peter's), Wallsend-on-Tyne, Northumberland, England
- Joshua and the Captain of the Hosts of the Lord (1921), Church of Ireland, Ballinderry, County Tyrone
- Immaculate Conception (1922); Sacred Heart (1922). Catholic Church, Timahoe, County Laois
- The Agony, St Thomas and Judith (19230, Catholic Church, Bridge-a-Chrin, County Louth
- St Catherine of Alexandria (1923), St. Victor's, Church of Ireland, Donore Avenue, Dublin
- Door panels (four) (c. 1922–4). Knockadoon Holiday Camp, Ballymacoda, County Cork
- Baptism (1923–24); Crucifixion (1923–24); Resurrection (1923–24). Designed by Wilhelmina Geddes and painted by Healy. Church of England, Bardsea, near Ulverston, Lancashire, England
- St Brendan (1924). Designed by Wilhelmina Geddes and painted mainly by Ethel Rhind, with some painting (chalice) by Healy. Catholic Church, Curraun, near Achill, County Mayo
- The Good Shepherd (1924–25); St Patrick (1924–25); St Brigid (1924–25); St Ita (1924–25); St Columcille (1924–25). Formerly in Chapel of Convent of Mercy, Ballyhaunis, County Mayo, now in the National Gallery of Ireland
- The Risen Christ (1924–25). Church of Ireland, Billy, County Antrim, (near Bushmills)
- Good Saint Anne (1925), Catholic Church (St Anne's), Conception Harbour, Conception Bay, Newfoundland, Canada
- St Anne teaching the Virgin to read, Joachim with the flock, the meeting at the Golden Gate, and St Anne spinning (c.1924–26). Sketch design for window not executed
- St Michael (1926). Mercersburg Academy, Mercersburg, Pennsylvania, United States
- Panel for Ragnar Östberg (1926). Subject unknown. Presumed location Sweden
- The Spirit of the Night (1926). Designed by Catherine O'Brien and painted mainly by her, though also by Healy. Commissioned for a private home in Singapore by Eu Tong Sen, now in Penang Colonial Museum, Penang, Malaysia.
- Veronica's Veil, Christ meets His Mother, Ecce homo (1926–27). Catholic Church, Clarecastle, County Clare
- St John the Evangelist (1927). St Brendan's Cathedral, Loughrea, County Galway
- St Helena (1927). Chapel at Newton Country Day School, Newton, Massachusetts, United States
- St Teresa of Avila (1927–28). Chapel at Newton Country Day School, Newton, Massachusetts, United States
- St Joseph at his bench (c.1927). Sketch design for window which was never executed
- Emma Cons Memorial (1928). Sketch designs (five) for opus-sectile mosaic, commissioned by Old Vic Theatre, London
- Iveagh Memorial (1928), Church of Ireland Cathedral St Patrick's Cathedral, Dublin. Window not executed and location of sketch design, etc. unknown
- Virgin and Child (1929). Church of Ireland, Billy, County Antrim, (near Bushmills)
- Annunciation, Christ the King, and Ascension (1929), Catholic Church, Warrenpoint, County Down. Northern Ireland
- Gogarty folding screen (1929). Location unknown
- E Finito (1929). Panel. Sligo County Museum, Sligo
- Christ the King (1929–30). St Brendan's Cathedral, Loughrea, County Galway
- St Victor (1930). St. Victor's, Church of Ireland, Donore Avenue, Dublin
- St Antony of Padua holding Christ (1930). Franciscan Friary, Athlone, County Westmeath (sketch design for window which was never executed)
- Charity (1930). Cemetery Chapel, Karori, Wellington, New Zealand
- St Peter (1930); The Good Shepherd (1930). Church of Ireland, Kill, Deansgrange, County Dublin (sketch designs for windows which were never executed)
- Love (1930). Cemetery Chapel, Karori, Wellington, New Zealand
- Acided flashed blue panel (1931). For Denis Santry in Singapore (current location unknown)
- St Luke, St James and St Mark (1932). St Mark's Church, Dundela Church of Ireland, Dundela, Belfast, County Antrim
- Suffer Little Children to Come Unto Me (1932). Church of Ireland, Castlerock, County Londonderry, Northern Ireland
- Outside the Courts (1932). Panel is Hugh Lane Municipal Gallery, Dublin: acided panel (1932). (Subject and location unknown)
- Series of roundels with emblems (1932). Dominican Church, Dundalk, County Louth
- The Rock of Cashel (c.1930–32). Sketch design for vignette which was never executed
- St Anne teaching the Virgin (1932). Sketch design for window which was never executed
- Patron Saints of Music (1932–33). Church of St. Vincent Ferrer (Manhattan), United States
- Our Lady Queen of Heaven (1933). St Brendan's Cathedral, Loughrea, County Galway
- St Augustine and St Monica (1933–34). Augustinian Priory, John's Lane Church Dublin
- Coronation of the Virgin (1934). St Peter and Paul's Catholic Church, Athlone, County Westmeath. (sketch design for window which was not executed)
- St Dominic receiving the Rosary (1934–35). Dominican Church, Galway
- Ecce Homo (1934–35). Billy, County Antrim, (near Bushmills)
- St Joseph (1935). St Brendan's Cathedral, Loughrea, County Galway
- St Francis of Assisi (c. 1934–36). Sketch design for window which was never executed)
- Ascension (1935–36). St Brendan's Cathedral, Loughrea, County Galway
- The Last Judgement (1936–40). St Brendan's Cathedral, Loughrea, County Galway
- Set of four acided panels (1936. 1938). Chicago, Illinois, United States (location unknown)
- Wisdom (1936–37). Cemetery Chapel, Karori, Wellington, New Zealand
- I.H.S.; Sacred Heart (1937). Chapel of Brophy College Preparatory, Phoenix, Arizona, United States
- Annunciation (1937–38); Visitation (1937–38). Blackrock College Chapel, Blackrock, County Dublin
- Served (1939); Barman and customer (1929). Both in private collections
- The First Dolour: Prophecy of Simeon (1935–38). Clongowes Wood College, County Kildare
- The Second Dolour: Flight into Egypt (1938–39). Clongowes Wood College, County Kildare
- The Third Dolour: Search for the Holy Child (1938–41). Clongowes Wood College, County Kildare
- The Fourth Dolour: Christ meets His Mother (1941). (Completed by Evie Hone). Clongowes Wood College, County Kildare
