= St Brendan's Cathedral, Loughrea =

St Brendan's Cathedral
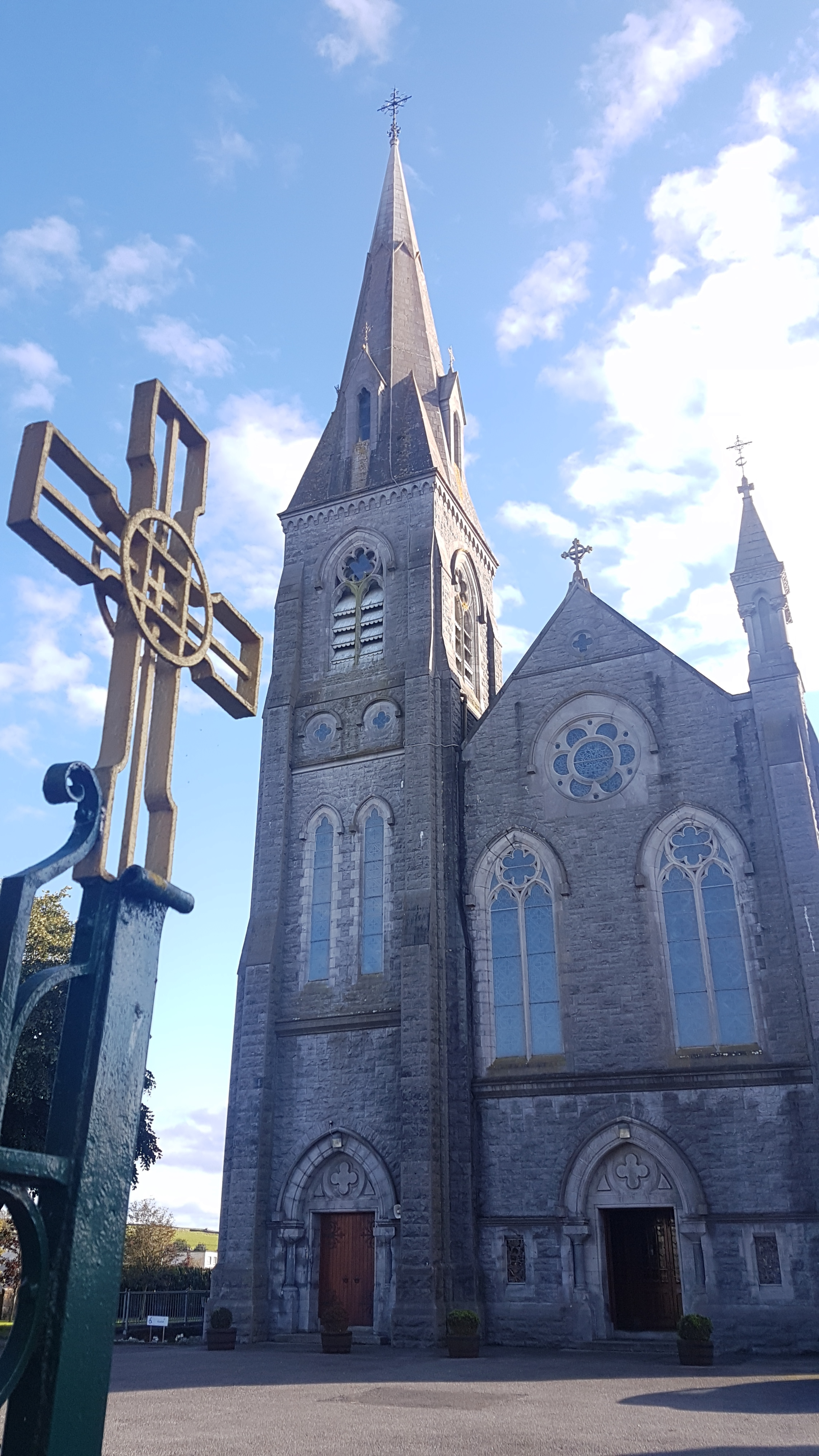

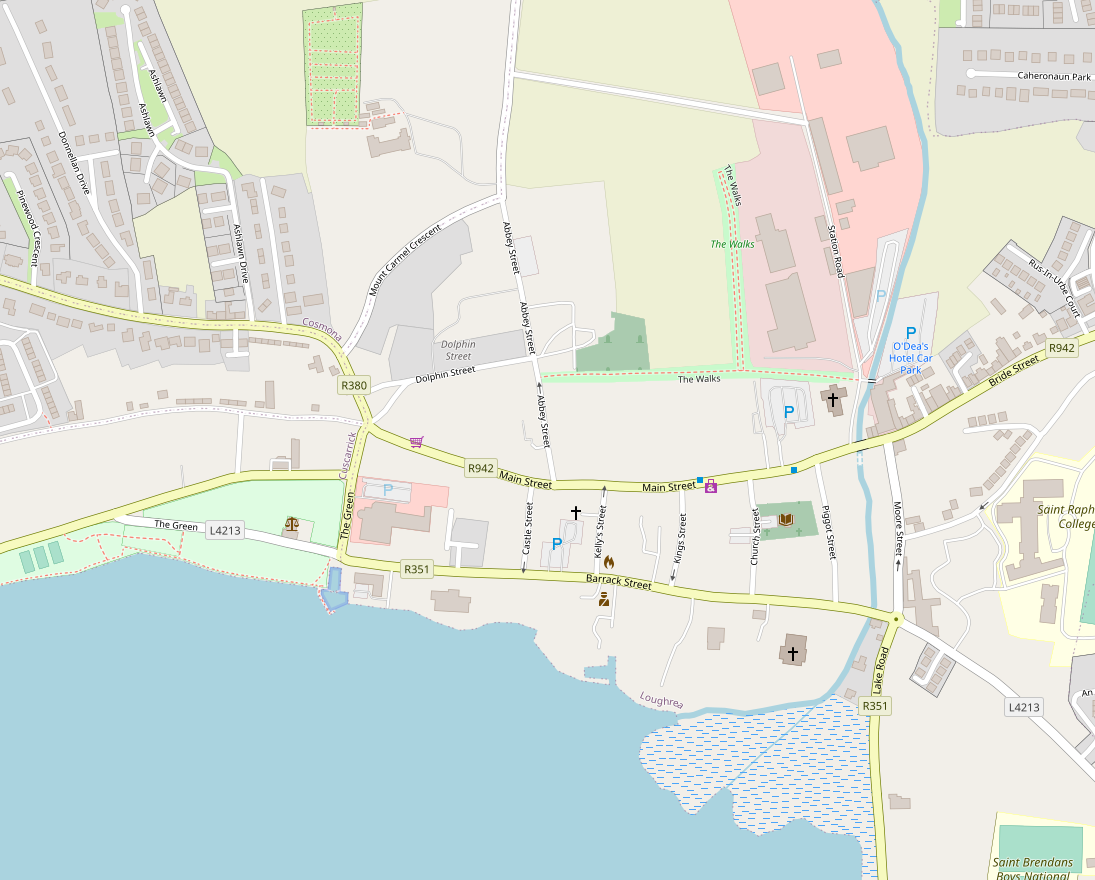
- Location within Loughrea Location within Ireland
- 53°11′49″N 8°34′00″W
- Location: Loughrea, County Galway
- Country: Ireland
- Language(s): English, Irish
- Denomination: Catholic
- Tradition: Roman Rite
- Website: loughreacathedral.ie

History
- Consecrated: 1902

Architecture
- Style: Gothic Revival
- Groundbreaking: 10 October 1897
- Completed: 1902

Administration
- Province: Tuam
- Archdiocese: Tuam
- Diocese: Clonfert

The Cathedral of St. Brendan, Loughrea, is the cathedral church of the Roman Catholic Diocese of Clonfert. The cathedral was designed in Neo-Gothic style and houses one of the most extensive collections of arts and crafts and Celtic Revival artefacts of any single building in Ireland. Its most noteworthy feature is the extensive collection of stained glass windows by the Dublin-based An Túr Gloine studio. There are also twenty-four embroidered banners, mostly depicting Irish saints as well as vestments by the Dun Emer Guild. Sculptors represented are John Hughes and Michael Shortall, and the architect William Alphonsus Scott also contributed designs for metalwork and woodwork. The foundation stone was laid on 10 October 1897 and the structure was completed in 1902; most of the interior features date from the first decade on the twentieth century with the exception of the stained glass windows which continued to be commissioned up until the 1950s.

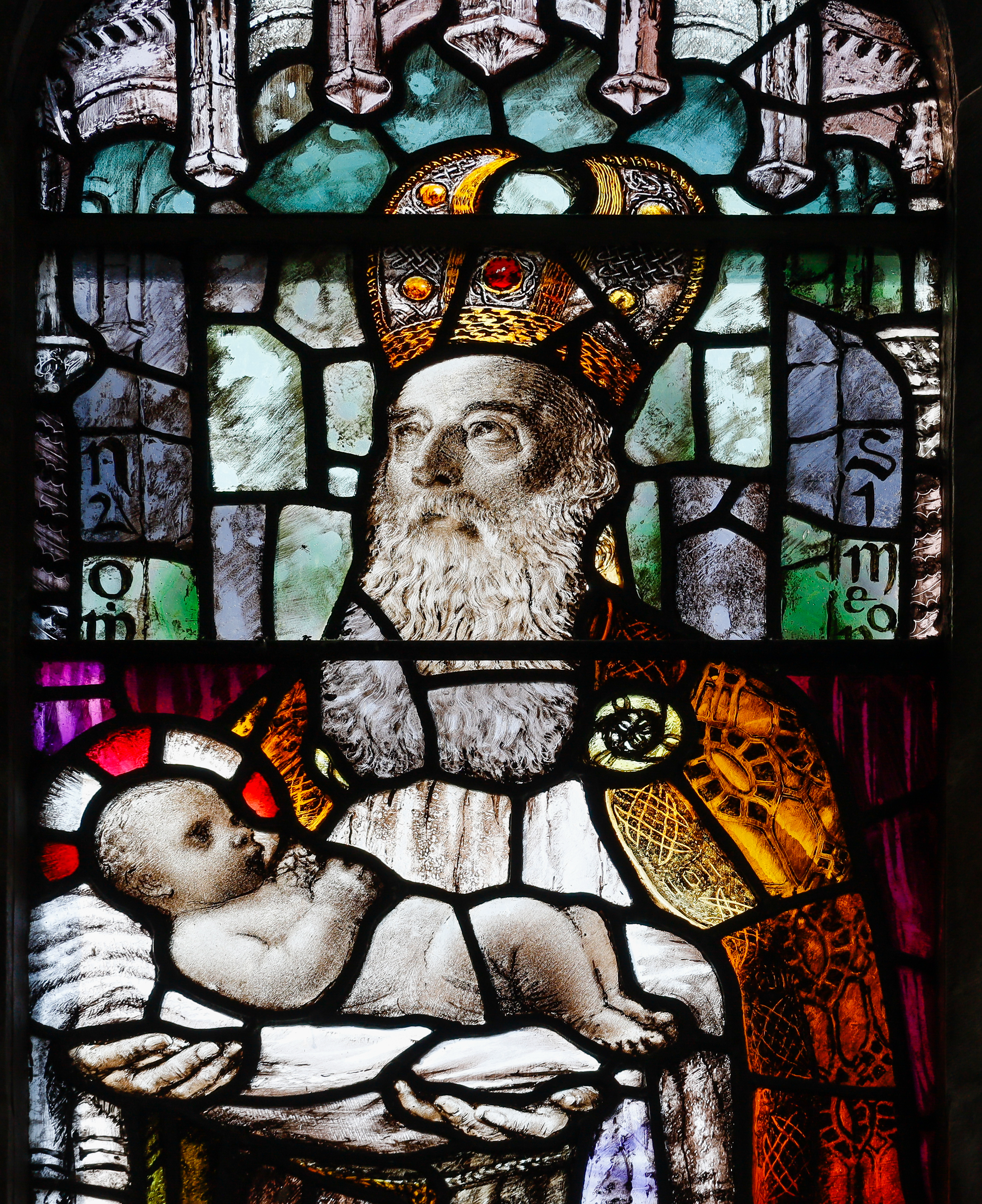
Loughrea St. Brendan's Cathedral Baptistry Window Simeon by Michael Healy Detail 2019 09 05

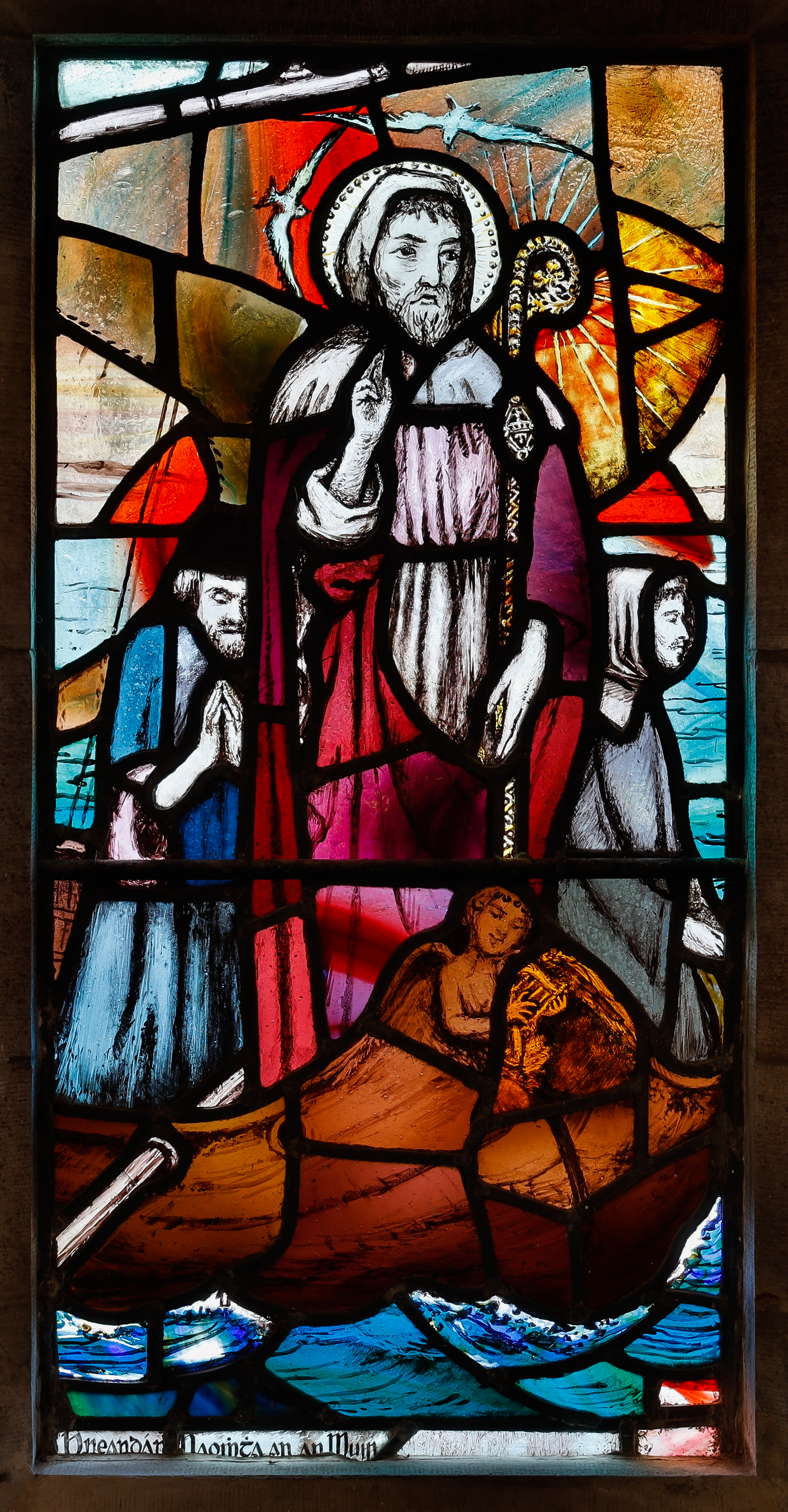
Loughrea St. Brendan's Cathedral Window “Breandán Naoṁṫa ar an Muir” by Sarah Purser 2019 09 05

The origins of An Túr Gloine and that of the cathedral's decorative scheme are inextricably connected. Among the studio's first orders were three apse windows, in 1903, for the new cathedral and virtually all of the studio's artists such as Michael Healy, Alfred E. Child, Sarah Purser, Beatrice Elvery, Ethel Rhind, Hubert McGoldrick, Catherine Amelia O'Brien and Evie Hone are represented. There are ten windows by Michael Healy, including the first one he both designed and executed, St Simeon, and also one of his undisputed finest, The Last Judgement completed in 1940, a year before he died.

In honour of the Irish Catholic Martyrs, a copy of the weeping "Irish Madonna of Hungary", which was removed by Bishop Walter Lynch from the former diocesan cathedral to preserve it from desecration during the Cromwellian conquest of Ireland, was presented in 2003 to the Roman Catholic Diocese of Clonfert by Bishop Pápai Janos of the Roman Catholic Diocese of Győr and now hangs inside St Brendan's Cathedral in Loughrea.
