= Ardrahan =

Village in County Galway, Ireland

Ardrahan Ard Raithin
- Village
- Location in Ireland
- Coordinates: 53°09′27″N 8°48′21″W
- Country: Ireland
- Province: Connacht
- County: County Galway

Area
  - Total: 9.8 km^{2} (3.8 sq mi)
- Elevation: 29 m (95 ft)

Population (2011)
  - Total: 540
  - Density: 55/km^{2} (140/sq mi)
- Time zone: UTC+0 (WET)
  - Summer (DST): UTC-1 (IST (WEST))
- Irish Grid Reference: M461121

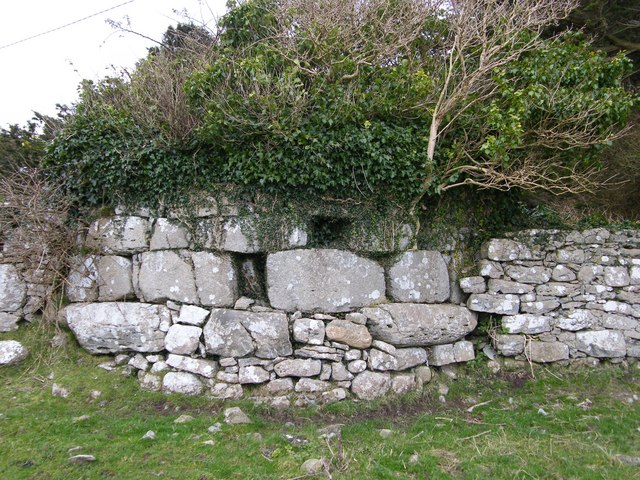
Remains of the Ardrahan round tower

Ardrahan (Irish: Ard Raithin, meaning 'high ringfort') is a village and civil parish in County Galway, Ireland.

== History ==
Richard de Burgo conquered Galway in 1236, and granted the land to Maurice Fitzgerald who built the castle whose ruins still stand today. The churchyard wall contains the remains of a round tower, which suggests that a monastic community may have existed on the site before the castle was built.

== Places of interest ==
The most noteworthy attraction in Ardrahan is Tulira Castle, once owned by playwright and independence activist Edward Martyn. Tulira Castle was for a long time owned by Galway County Council, but was bought in 2015 by CarTrawler owner Niall Turley for €5.8 million.

The church at Labane, Ardrahan, which was the parish church of Joe Roche, has several stained glass windows by Alfred E. Child, Ethel Rhind and Michael Healy.

The Ardrahan Grassland is a Special Area of Conservation located to the west of the village.

== Transport ==
Ardrahan is on the R458.

Ardrahan railway station opened on 15 September 1869, was closed to passenger traffic on 5 April 1976 and finally closed on 11 June 1983. A new railway station has opened as part of phase one of the reopening of the Western Rail Corridor between Ennis and Athenry.

== Education ==
There is only one school in Ardrahan, which is Labane N.S

== Sport ==
Ardrahan GAA, the local hurling club, won its first Galway Senior Hurling Club Championship title in 1894 and since then has won it on 11 occasions, having contested 18 county finals in its history. It is second on the role of honour to Castlegar who have won 17 titles.

Ardrahan also has a Camogie club. In 2006, and again in 2019, the U14 girls won the Féile Final and went on to represent Galway in Cork. In 2006, they got to the All-Ireland Semi-Final.

== Cultural references ==
Ardrahan is mentioned in William Hope Hodgson's book The House on the Borderland as the nearest greater village to a small village called Kraighten, near which the author's diary has been found. Ardrahan also features in the rousing ballad The West's Awake, most famously rendered by Joe McDonagh in the immediate aftermath of Galway's All Ireland Hurling Championship victory of 1980.

== See also ==
- List of towns and villages in Ireland
