= Saint John (O'Brien) =

Stained glass window by Catherine O'Brien

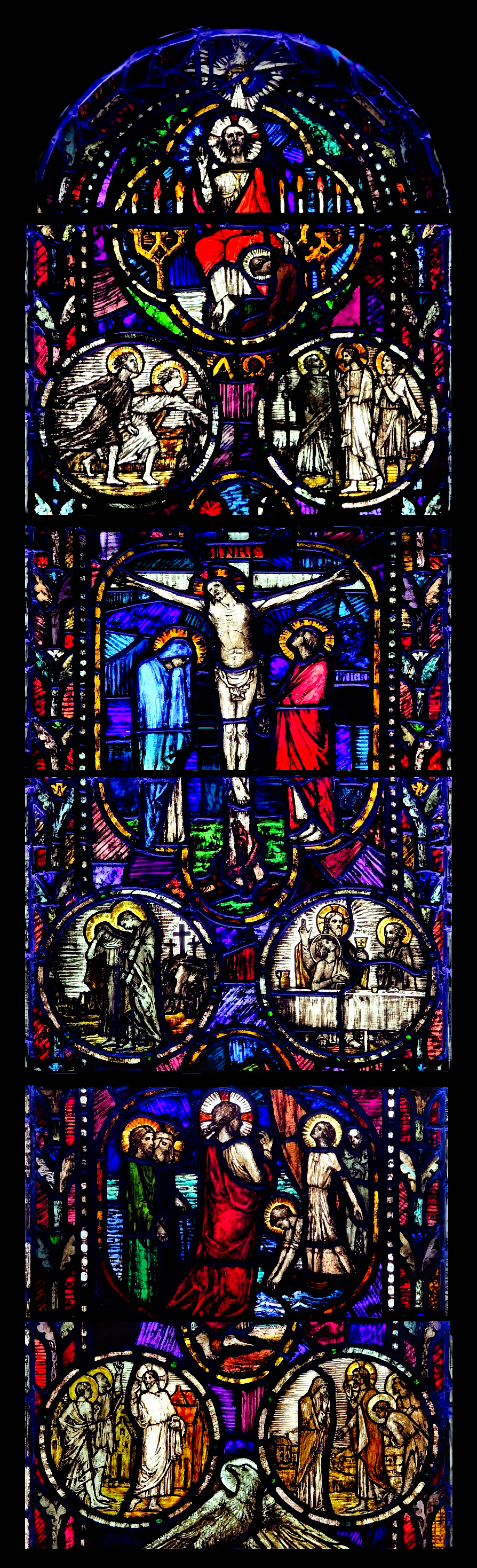
St. John at the Honan Chapel, Cork

The Saint John stained glass window in the Honan Chapel, Cork was designed in 1916 by the Irish artist Catherine "Kitty" O'Brien. She was then part of Sarah Purser's workshop An Túr Gloine, which was commissioned to produce eight windows for the chapel. Of these, O'Brien's "Saint John window" is considered the most successful.

It is the only of the 19 stained glass windows in the chapel to portray a biblical narrative – is usually considered the strongest of An Túr Gloine's windows for its craftsmanship and strength of imagery. Sometimes mistakenly attributed to Child, it is very different to Child's "Our Lord" window, which is reminiscent of a more traditional style of stained glass design. Although O'Brien has not received the same level of study as other members of the An Túr Gloine studio, both Virginia Teehan and Nicola Gordon Bowe have commented on her "beguiling narrative details" and "successful harmonisation of colour with The Clarke windows in the chapel".

The window is divided into three registers, each containing pairs of medallions. The imagery mostly concerns the life of Christ as told in the Gospel of John, and draws more from close readings of scripture than traditions of iconography. The upper register is based on Revelations 1:1, and shows a vision of the glorified Christ in Majesty, with the Alpha and Omega symbols and the seven candles. John, who throughout the panels is depicted as beardless young man, is shown at the side with his head bowed. The two medallions below this are based on the Gospel of John, and show (on the left) St. Peter and John running towards Jesus' tomb, and (on the right) Jesus walking with Peter while St John follows behind.

The crucifixion scene in the central register is more richly coloured that the other panels, and per tradition shows Mary and St. John at the foot of the cross. More characteristic of Protestant than Catholic iconography (Note: O'Brien, who joined An Túr Gloine in 1904, came from an Anglo-Irish and devout Church of Ireland family. She is credited with three of the chapel's windows. See Hayes & Rogers (2012), pp. 130, 131) is the depiction of a serpent with its mouth open, coiled around the cross below Jesus' feet; the serpent probably refers to Genesis 3:15: "And I will put enmity between thee (the serpent) and the woman, and between thy seed and her seed; it shall bruise thy head, and thou shalt bruise his heel." The medallions below the crucifixion reflect two accounts of John's brother James, "the disciple whom Jesus loved". The lowest register is again in bright colours and shows the calling of James and John. The images stays with scriptural tradition; James and John are accompanied by their father, and are the second pair to be called, after St. Peter and St. Andrew, who are already at Jesus' side. The eagle at the foot of the window is John's usual symbol.

== Sources ==
- Hayes, Myra; Rogers, Jessie (2012). "Lost in Translation". Irish Arts Review. 29 (4): 128–131. JSTOR 41763156.
- O'Connell, John (1916). The Honan Hostel Chapel Cork: Some Notes on the Building and the Ideas which Inspired It. Cork: Guy & Company.
- Teehan, Virginia; Heckett, Elizabeth (2005). The Honan Chapel: A Golden Vision. Cork: Cork University Press. ISBN 978-1-8591-8346-5.
