= Ardrahan Grassland =

Ecological site in County Galway, Ireland

- Féarach Árd Raithín
- Location within Ireland
- Location: County Galway, Ireland
- Nearest city: Loughrea, County Galway
- Coordinates: 53°09′54″N 8°49′52″W
- Area: 200.82 ha (496.2 acres)
- Established: 2019
- Governing body: National Parks and Wildlife Service

The Ardrahan Grassland (Irish: Féarach Árd Raithín) Special Area of Conservation or SAC is a designated Natura 2000 site, situated near the towns of Gort and Loughrea in County Galway, Ireland. Ardrahan Grassland is designated as a Special Area of Conservation under four qualifying interests: alpine and boreal heaths, Juniperus communis formations on heaths or calcareous grasslands, semi-natural dry grasslands and scrubland facies on calcareous substrates (Festuco-Brometalia) and limestone pavements.

== Location ==
Ardrahan Grassland Special Area of Conservation is located in south County Galway, northwest of the town of Ardrahan, in the townlands of Brackloon, Caherateige, Caherdaly, Cloghboley, Keamsellagh East, Kiltiernan West, Parkatleva and Rooaunmore.

== Etymology ==
According to archival material provided in the Logainm.ie Irish placenames website, the name Ardrahan, as Árd Raithín in the Irish language, dates back at least to the Annals of Connacht in the 1200s. The first part of the name Ardrahan - ‘Árd’ - corresponds to ‘height’ or ‘high’ in the Irish language, while the second part of the name ‘rahan’ or, in Irish, ‘raithín', corresponds to ‘small ringfort.’

== Special Area of Conservation qualification ==
The Ardrahan Grassland site was designated as a Special Area of Conservation for four key Habitats Directive Annex I habitats:

- Limestone pavement (priority habitat) [Natura 2000 code 8240]
- Orchid‐rich Calcareous grassland (priority habitat) [Natura 2000 code 6210]
- Alpine and subalpine heaths [Natura 2000 code 4060]
- Juniper scrub [Natura 2000 code 5130]

These four habitats were selected as key Irish sites for protection under the Habitats Directive Annex III criteria.
