= St Mark's Church, Dundela =

Coordinates: 54.6030°N 5.8747°W

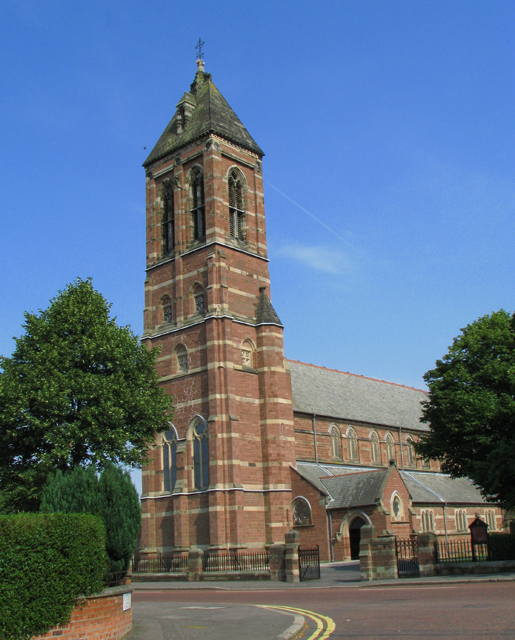
- St Mark's Church, Dundela
- Location: Holywood Road, Belfast
- Country: Northern Ireland
- Denomination: Church of Ireland
- Churchmanship: High Church

History
- Dedication: St. Mark the Evangelist
- Consecrated: 22 August 1878

Architecture
- Heritage designation: Grade A listed
- Designated: 1 May 1986
- Architect: William Butterfield
- Groundbreaking: 1876
- Completed: 1891

St Mark's Church, Dundela, is a Grade A listed parish church of the Church of Ireland located in the Sydenham area of Belfast, Northern Ireland.

== History ==
For much of its history, the parish of Dundela was located within the neighbouring parish of Holywood, County Down. In the mid-19th century, due to the constant growth of Belfast and the local area, the Church of Ireland began holding services in a coach-house, and in 1863, in what is now Strandtown Primary School.

William Butterfield was commissioned to design a new church for the ever-growing parish, and groundbreaking for the new building took place in May 1876. It was consecrated by the Bishop of Down, Connor and Dromore, Robert Knox, on 22 August 1878, after which it became a separate parish church from Holywood, with Thomas Hamilton as the first rector. The building was completed in 1891, with the addition of a chancel and two transepts, forming a cruciform structure. The church underwent a large restoration in 1976, led by Stephen Dykes Bower. The rectory, to the south of the church, was built in 1887.

== Bells ==
The bell tower contains a peal of ten bells, hung for change ringing. When the church was built, it was intended for there to be a ring of bells in the tower, and an eight-bell frame was provided, however only the treble and tenor were bought, due to the severe movement of the structure when these bells were rung. In the 1950s, a legacy was found providing for the installation of a ring, and the church commissioned John Taylor & Co of Loughborough, England, for a ring of ten bells.

The new ring, in the key of F#, was installed in 1955 in a new cast iron frame, and were dedicated on 23 April 1955 by the Reverend William Kerr, Bishop of Down and Dromore. Due to the structural movement, these were placed very low in the tower, and the weight of the tenor was kept as low as possible.

== C. S. Lewis ==
The church is best known in popular culture for its connection to C. S. Lewis (1898–1963), whose grandfather, Thomas Hamilton, was the first rector of the parish. Lewis was baptised in the church by him on 29 January 1899 as an infant. It is popularly believed that the character Aslan, from The Chronicles of Narnia, was based on the door handle of a lion (the Lion of Saint Mark) on the front door of the rectory. A replica is now installed in its place.

Lewis and his brother Warren (1895–1973) donated a window to the church in memory of their parents in 1935. The glass artist was Michael Healy.

== Gallery ==
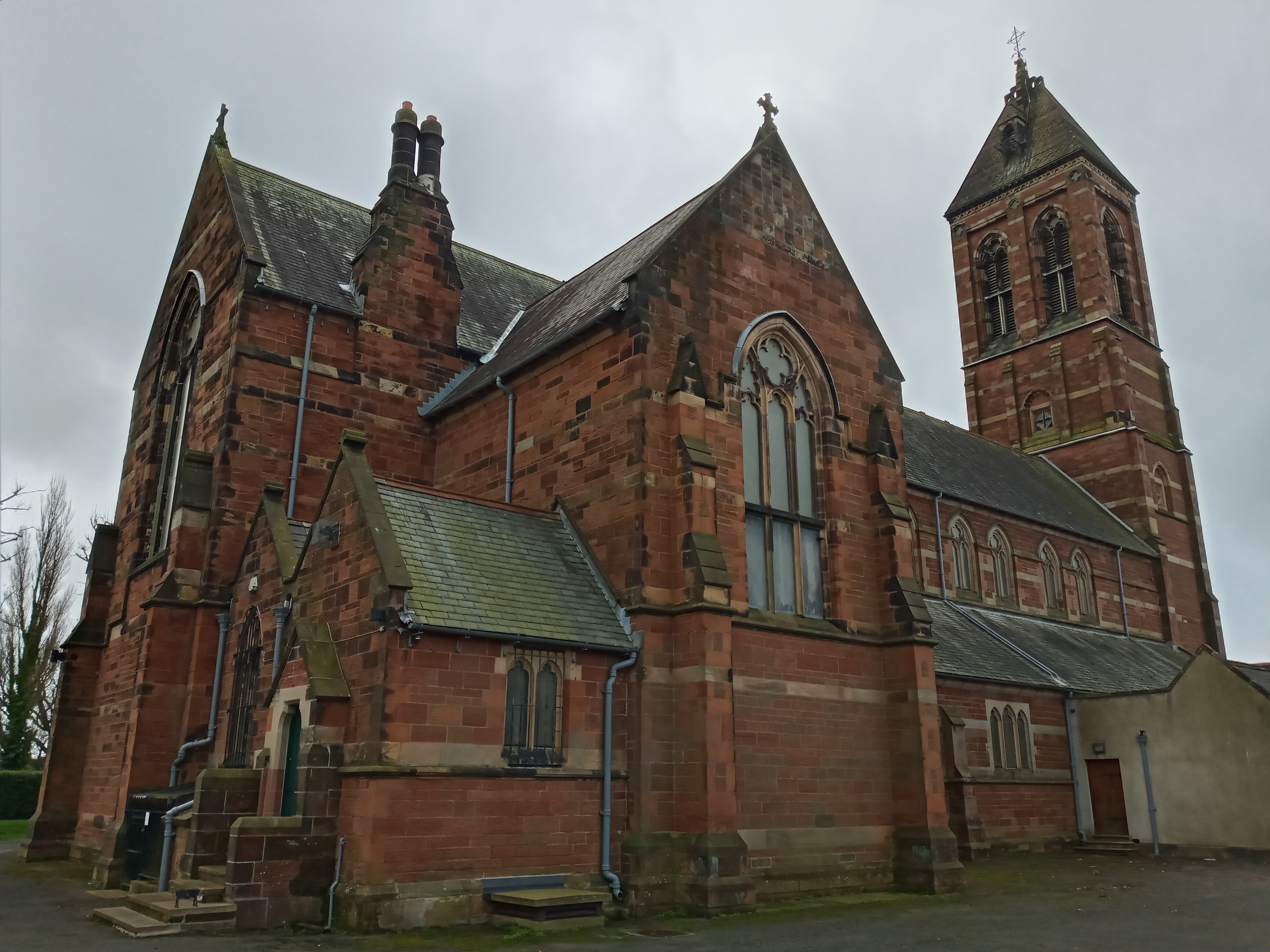

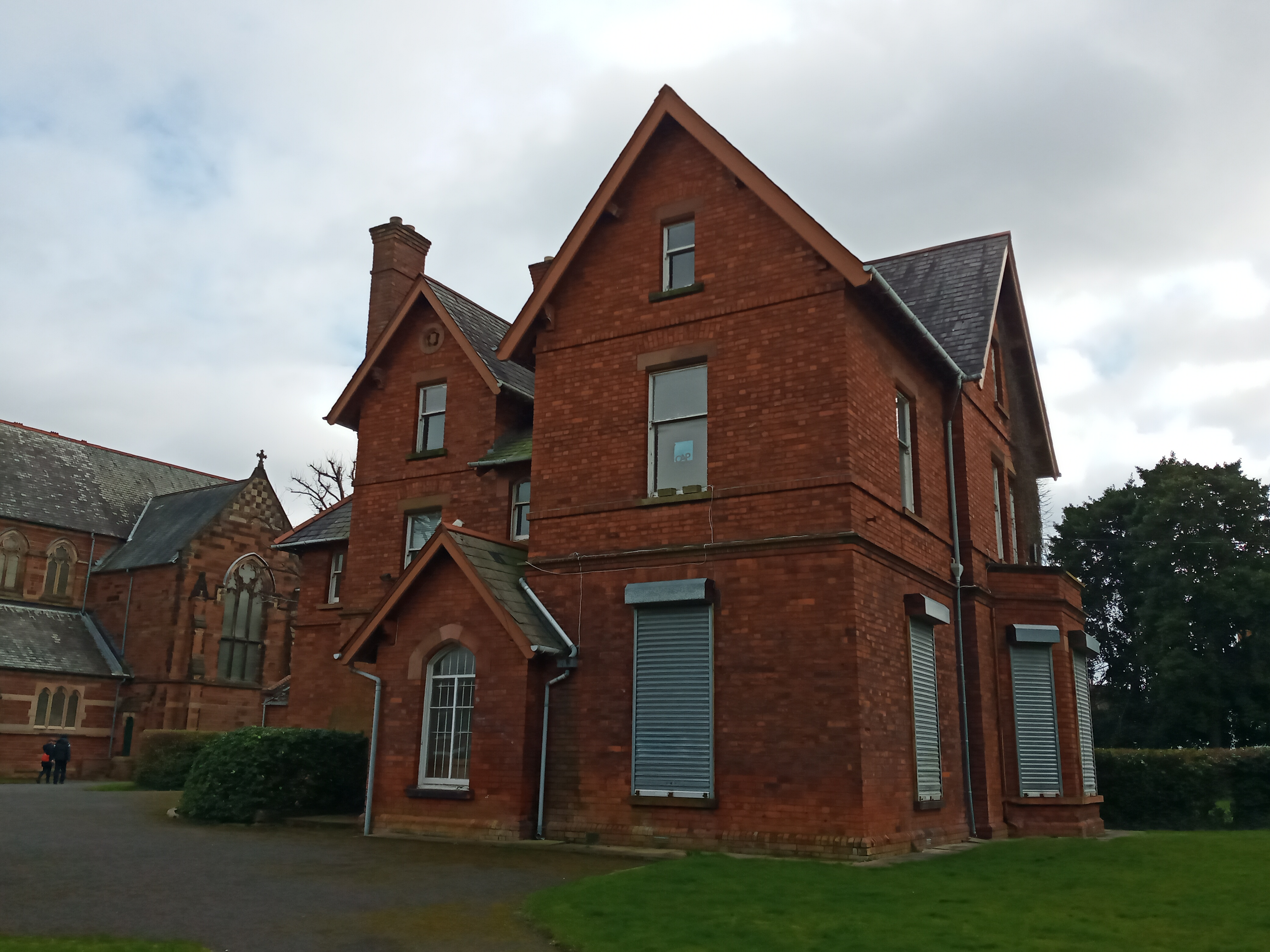
The now-disused rectory

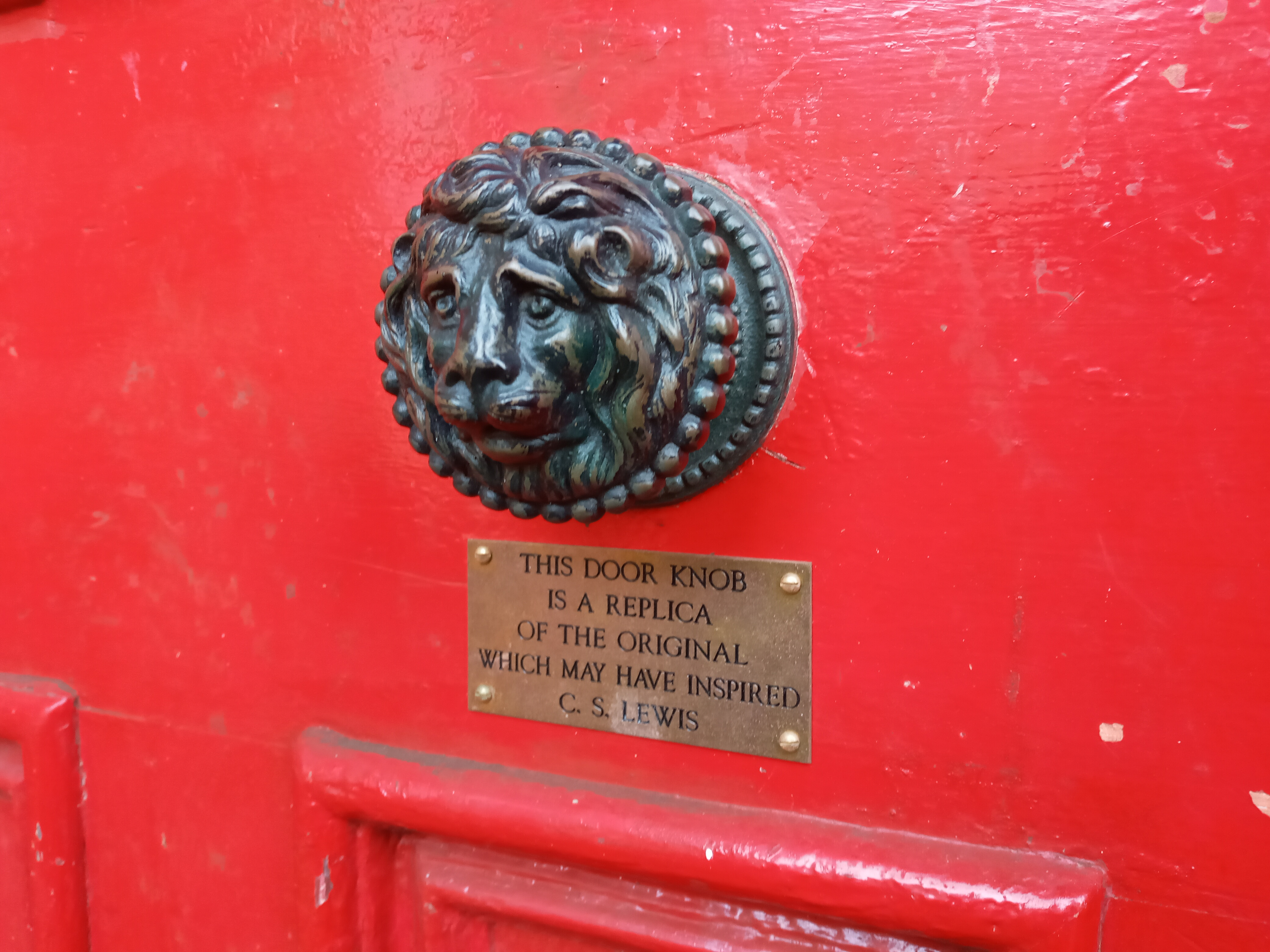
The door knocker thought to have inspired C. S. Lewis

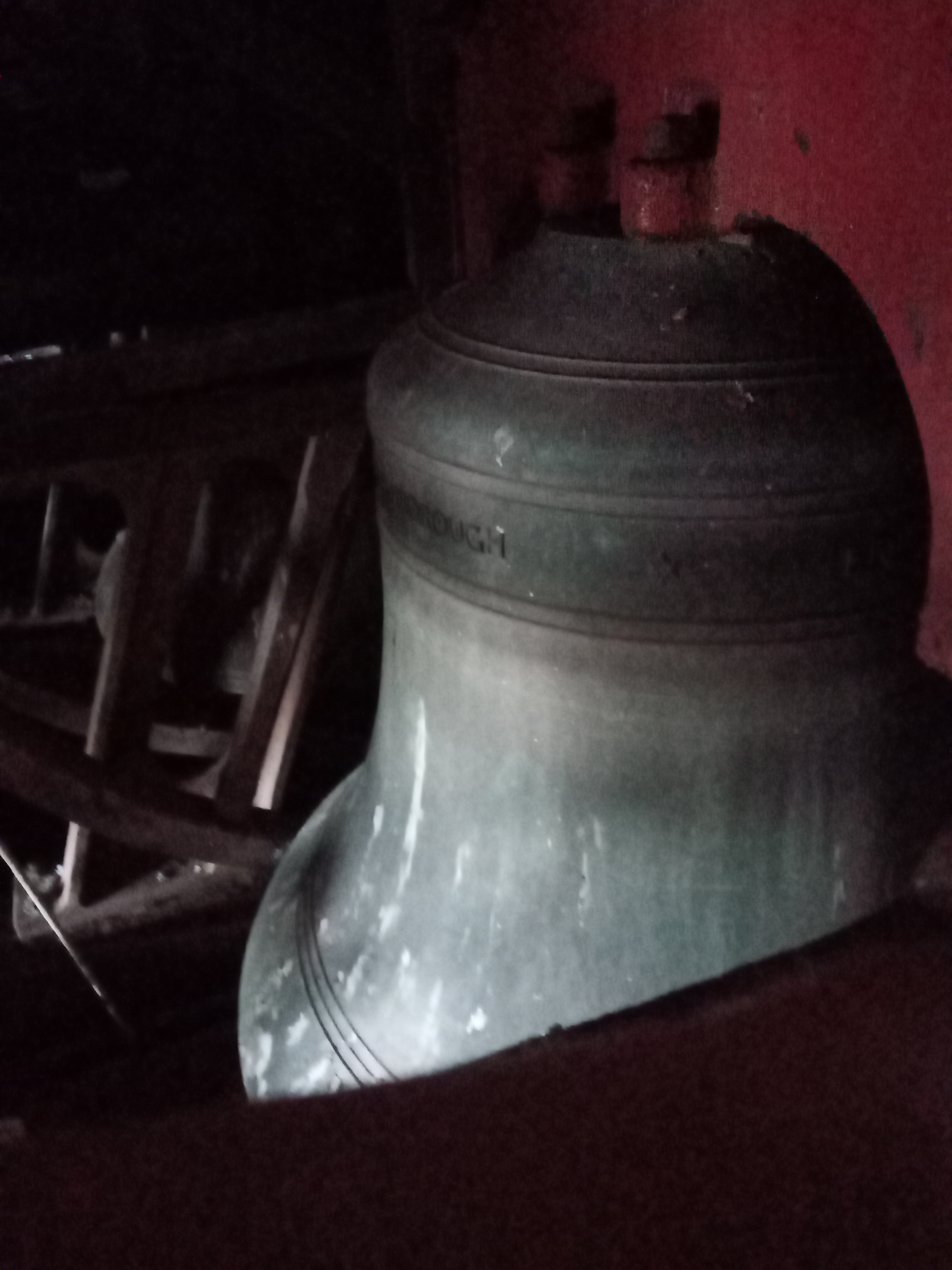
The tenor bell, weighing 12-2-2 hundredweight and tuned to F#

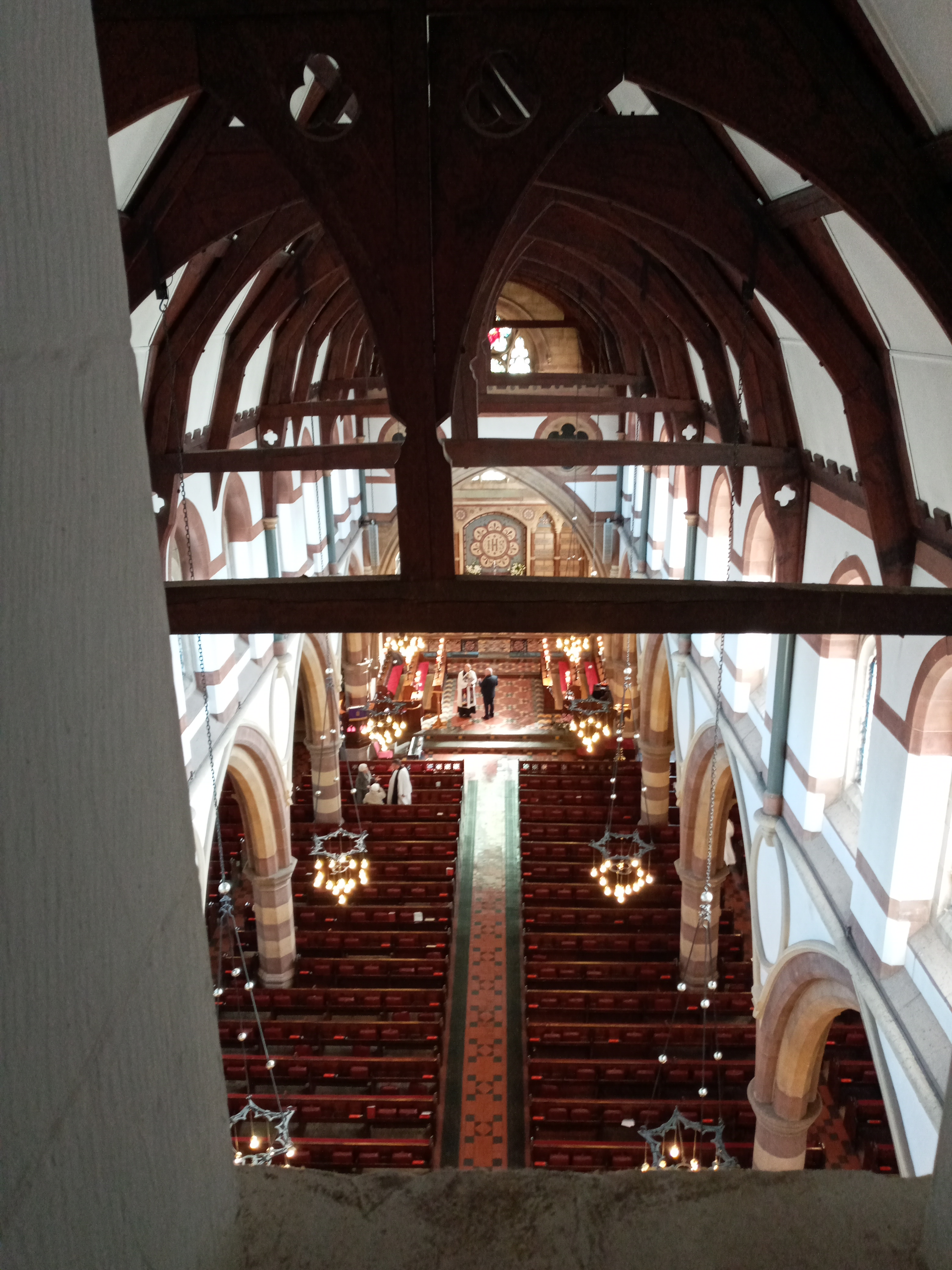

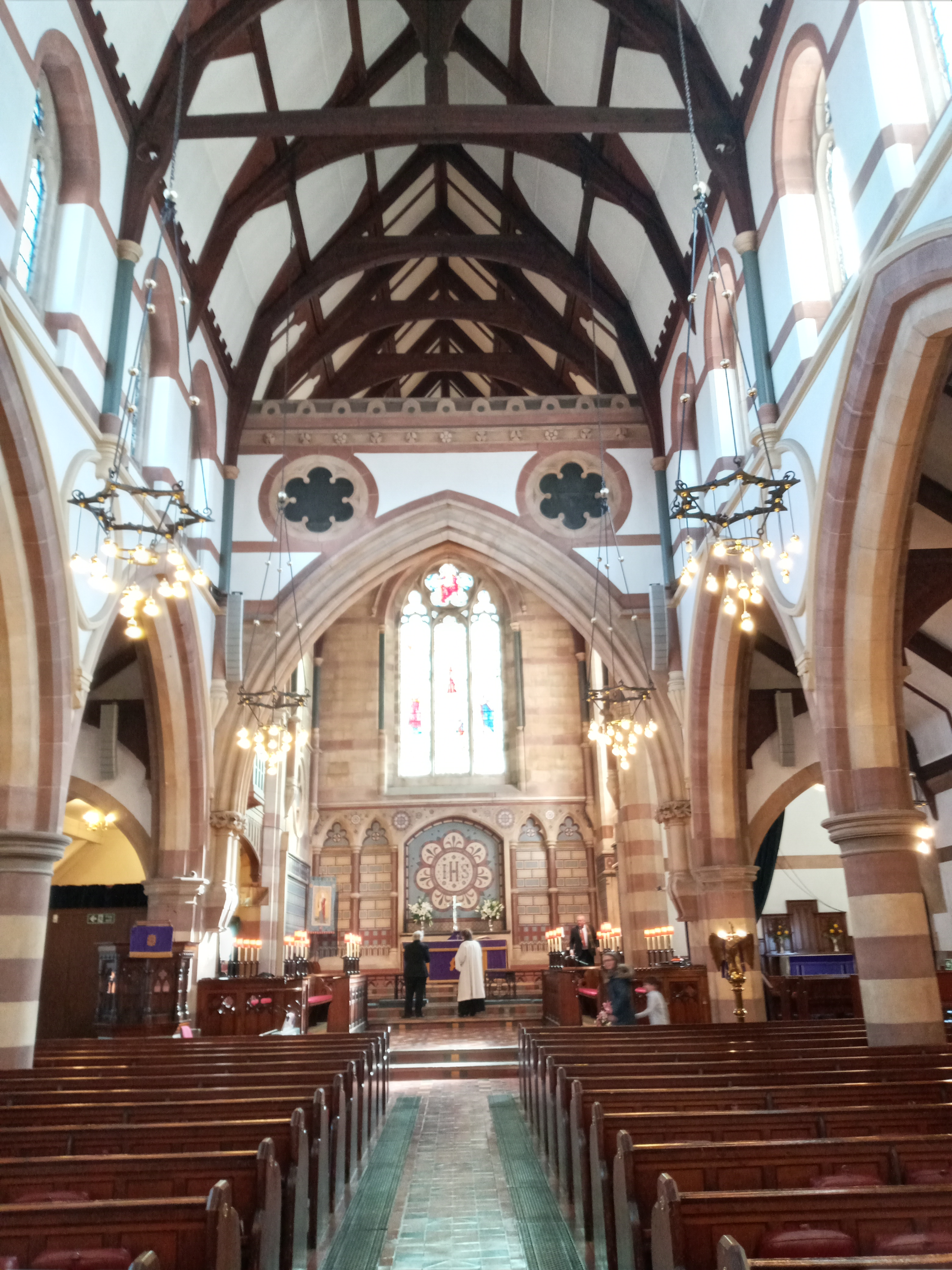

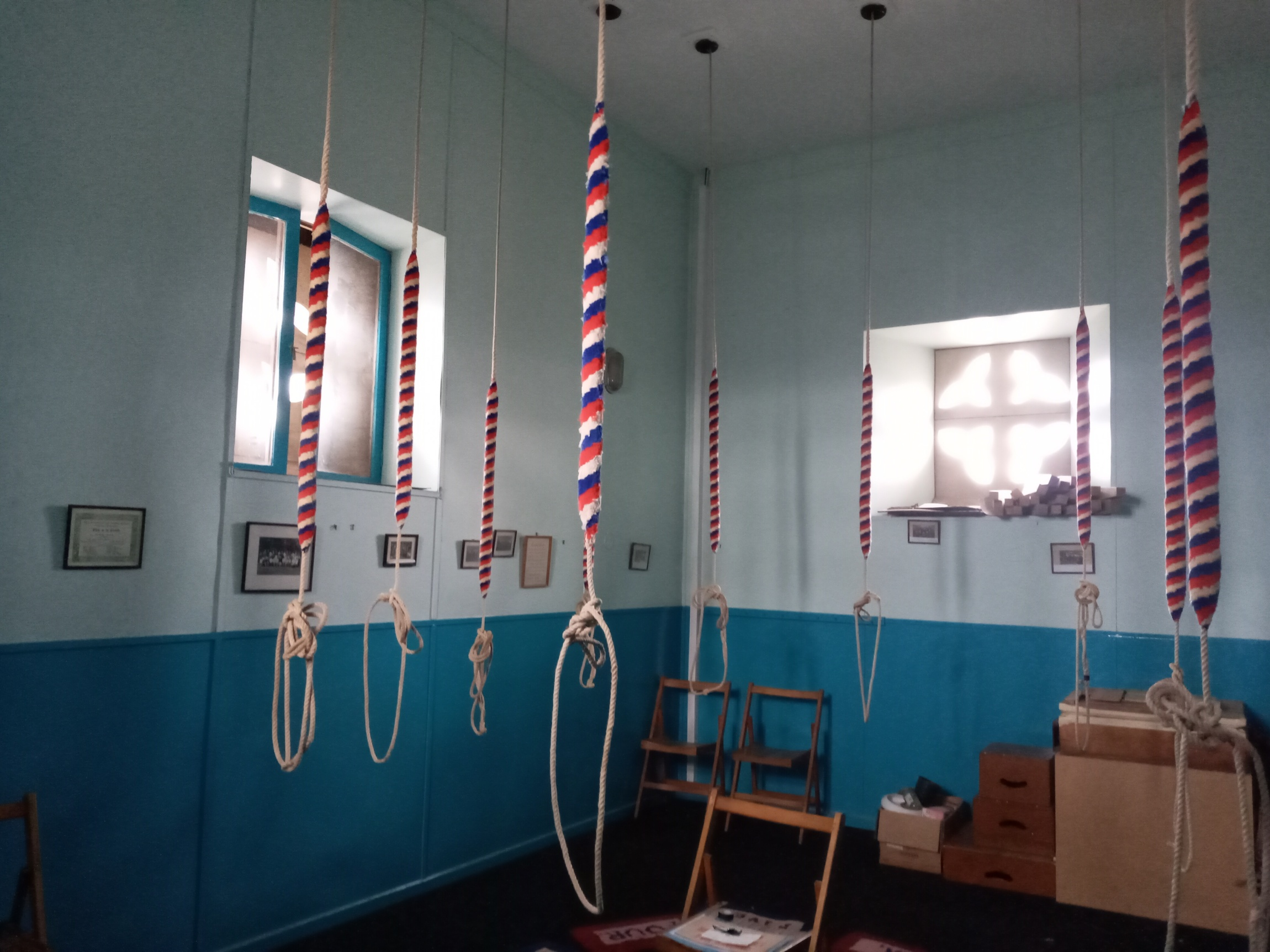
Ringing room of the church
