= Catherine O'Brien (artist) =

Irish artist

Catherine Amelia O'Brien
- Born: 19 June 1881; Durra House, Spancill Hill, County Clare
- Died: 18 July 1963 (aged 82); Sir Patrick Dun's Hospital, Dublin
- Resting place: Whitechurch Parish Graveyard, County Dublin
- Education: Dublin Metropolitan School of Art
- Known for: Stained glass design

Catherine Amelia "Kitty" O'Brien (19 June 1881 – 18 July 1963) was an Irish stained glass artist, and a member and director of An Túr Gloine.

== Early life and education ==
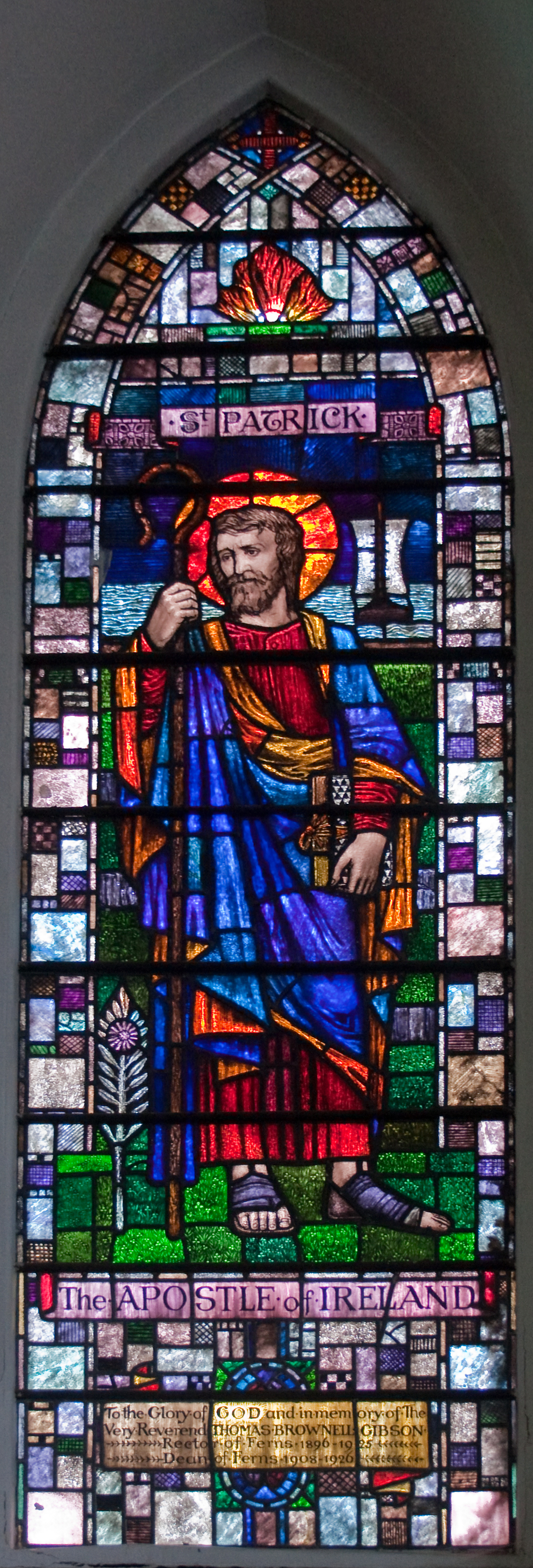
Ferns Cathedral St. Patrick by Catherine O'Brien

Catherine Amelia O'Brien was born in Durra House, Spancill Hill, County Clare on 19 June 1881. She was one of five children of Pierce O'Brien, a gentleman landowner, and Sophia Angel St John O'Brien. Her first cousin was woodcarver Sophia St John Whitty. O'Brien attended the Mercy Convent in Ennis. Despite being born into a middle-class country Anglo-Irish Protestant family, family funds later running low required her to move to Dublin to acquire training for a career. She went on to win a scholarship to the Dublin Metropolitan School of Art, first recorded attending there in 1901. Whilst there she studied under William Orpen, and Alfred E. Child who taught her the art of stained glass.

== Artistic work ==
Amongst her first commissions was the St Ita window for St Brendan's cathedral in Loughrea in 1904, which was designed by Sarah Purser. O'Brien joined An Túr Gloine in 1903, alongside Michael Healy as the first two artists recruited. She began her career there by designing Angel of the Annunciation window in the Enniskillen convent chapel. For a window in the Wilson private chapel Coolcarrigan, Naas, County Kildare in 1912, O'Brien incorporated Celtic design, some drawing on the Book of Durrow. In 1914, she toured the cathedrals of Paris, Rouen, and Chartres with Purser and Wilhelmina Geddes. O'Brien designed three windows depicting St John, St Flannan, and St Munchin, for the Honan Chapel in University College Cork in 1916. Her 1923 design of the centenary memorial window in St Andrew's church, Lucan, represented the parable of the Good Shepherd. When in 1925 An Túr Gloine became a cooperative society, O'Brien became a shareholder along with Ethel Rhind, Evie Hone, and Michael Healy.

Her 1926 lunette The spirit of night represented night, twilight, and dawn, and was for the private home of Keng Chee Roselands in Singapore, the building was later demolished. The window of St Catherine of Siena for the Sacred Heart convent chapel, Newton, Massachusetts dates from 1927. O'Brien's 1931 St Patrick window, for the De La Salle school, East Coast Rd, Singapore, commissioned by architect Denis Santry, and is the only extant stained-glass work by an Irish artist in that country. Much like Rhind, O'Brien also employed opus sectile, such as in her 1936 Mass in penal days in the Franciscan friary, Athlone, County Westmeath. O'Brien contributed two windows, Pelican and lamb and Host and chalice: wheat and grapes, to the ten windows An Túr Gloine produced for Brophy College Chapel, Phoenix, Arizona in 1937. From 1937 until 1947, O'Brien worked on 22 opus sectile panels for the Protestant Church in Ennis.

Purser retired from An Túr Gloine in 1940, and O'Brien succeeded her as director until the studio's closure in January 1944, going on to purchase it and the contents. O'Brien rented a section of the premises to fellow stained-glass artist Patrick Pollen from 1954 onwards. O'Brien exhibited at the 1953 Irish Exhibition of Living Art, and the 1958 exhibition of the Arts and Crafts Society of Ireland. When the An Túr Gloine studios were fire damaged in 1958, she rebuilt then and reopened by 1959. O'Brien was an active member of the Soroptimists and the Guild of Irish Art Workers. The last work she completed was a three-light window for the Church of St Multose, Kinsale in 1962. A commission for two windows for the private chapel of Áras an Uachtaráin for President Éamon de Valera was left unfinished at her death.

== Artistic Style ==
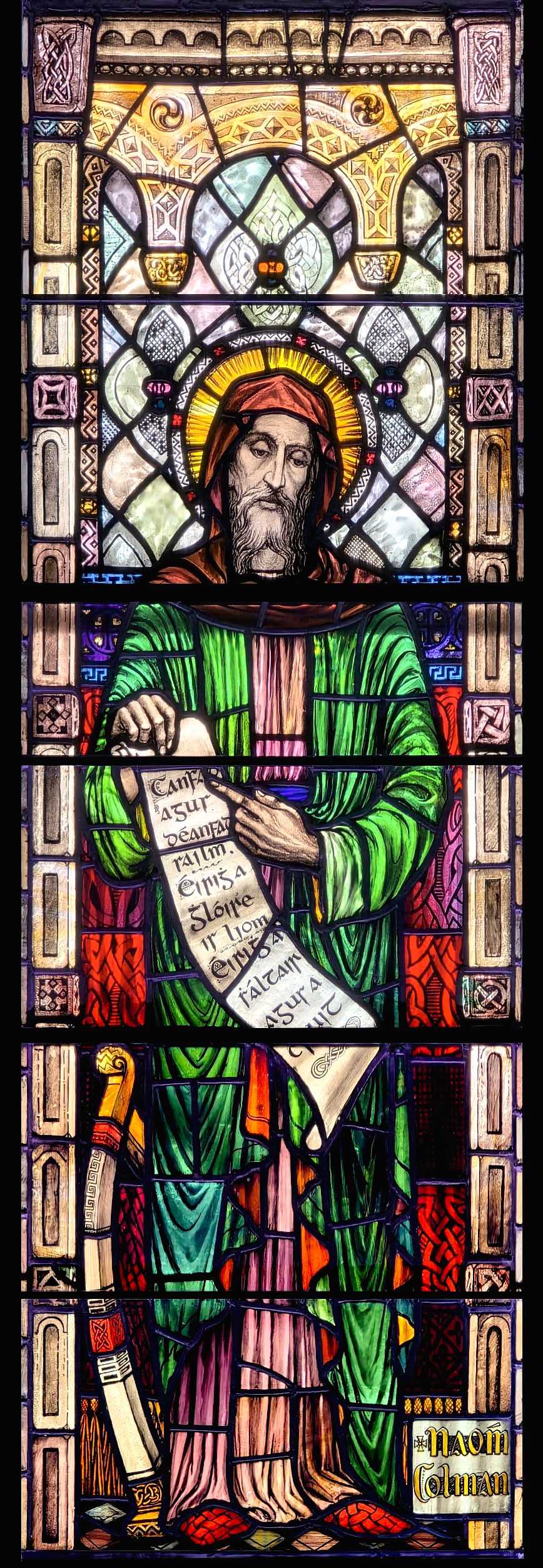
St. John window, Honan Chapel, Cork

O'Brien's artistic style evolved over her career of almost 60 years, some early work including windows that showed the legacy of Christopher Whall, where she utilised imagery reministent of the Irish countryside such as quarries. Her saintly figures would often be canopied by delicate designs of branches and leaves. She seemed most comfortable working with straightforward human figures, sometimes struggling to capture gesture and movement. In the early 1930s, she evolved to prefer more bright tones over her initial muted palette, intense oranges, reds, blues, and greens. Her art often evokes folk art in its colour and motif choices.

She generally stuck to smaller scale windows that allowed for more intimate designs over large multi-light windows, but there were exceptions, such as a fine five-light, Crossing the Bar for Kinsale Church of Ireland. Her works tended to keep a simple and modest design and execution, fitting perfectly into country churches. Moving into the 1950s, her work is characterised by simpler designs, sometimes resembling children's book illustration.

It was unusual for artist's in An Túr Gloine to sign their work, but O'Brien regularly left her signature of 'K.O'B' or 'K.O'Brien', sometimes accompanied by a tiny tower.

== Death and legacy ==
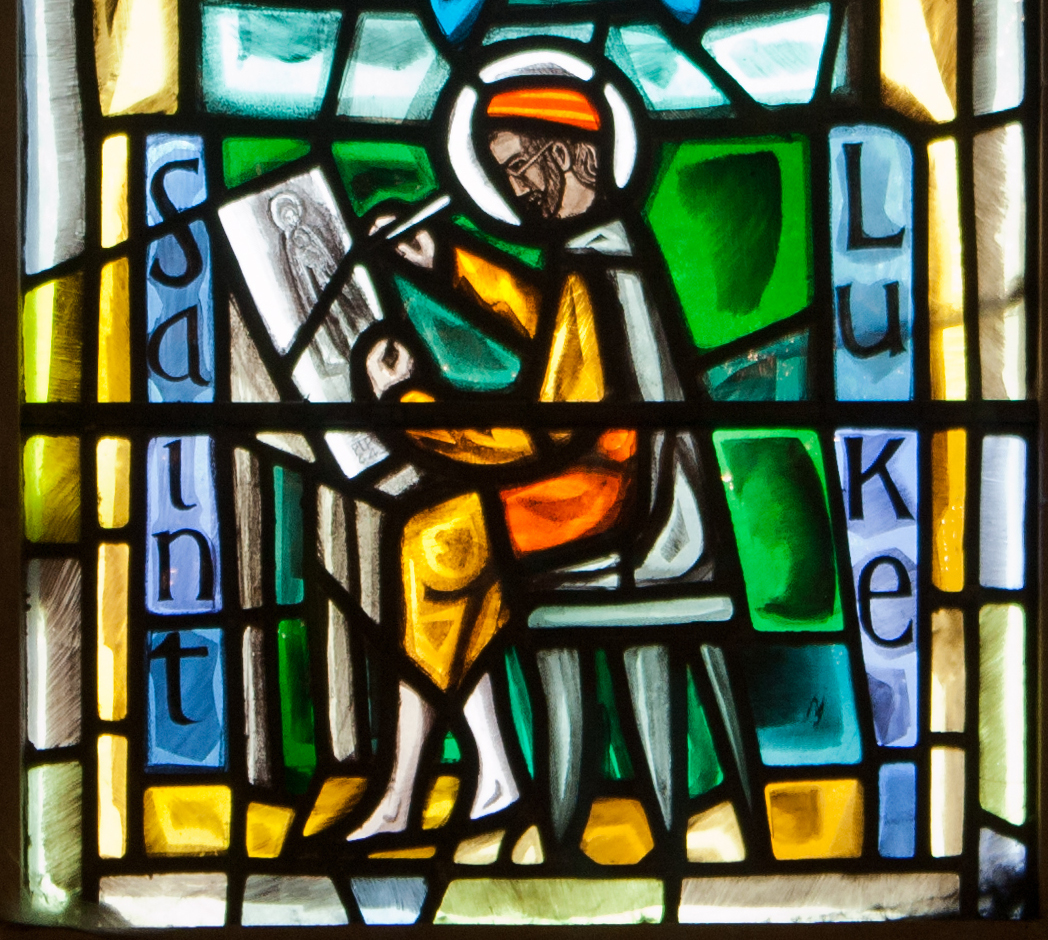
Dublin Christ Church Cathedral Chapel of Laurence O'Toole Window Virgin and Child with Saint Luke by Patrick Pollen (detail)

O'Brien died in Dublin on 18 July 1963, and is buried in Whitechurch Parish Graveyard, County Dublin. She is commemorated in a window designed by Pollen in St Laurence O'Toole chapel, Christ Church Cathedral, Dublin, where for forty years she made floral arrangements. Over 150 of her An Túr Gloine drawings from notebooks are now in the National Gallery of Ireland.

== Selected works ==
- St Patrick window, St Edan's cathedral, Ferns, County Wexford (1931).
- Scenes from John Bunyan's The pilgrim's progress, St Bartholomew's church, Ballineen, County Cork (1936).
- Transfiguration of Christ window, St Naithi's church, Dundrum, County Dublin.
- Window in memory of Bishop Harry Vere White, St Bartholomew's church, Clyde Rd, Dublin (1942).
- St Francis of Assisi window, Church South Kinacop, Nairobi County, Kenya (1953).
- The sower, Killoughter Protestant church, Redhills, County Cavan (1953).
- 16 roundels, St Helen's church, Vero Beach, Florida (1958).
