= Billy, County Antrim =

Civil parish in County Antrim, Northern Ireland

Coordinates: 55.174°N 6.455°W

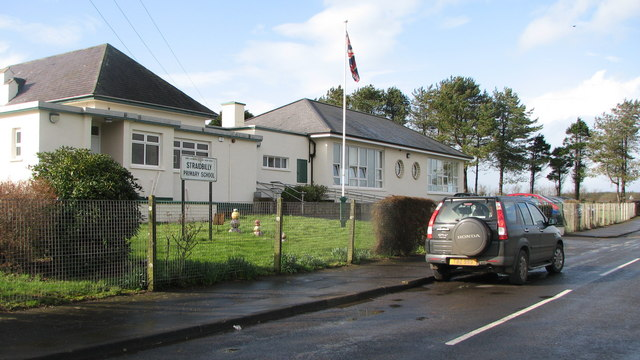
Straidbilly Primary School, Billy, County Antrim

Billy (Irish: Bile) is a civil parish in County Antrim, Northern Ireland. It spans the historic baronies of Cary and Dunluce Lower, and is approximately 26 square miles (67 km^{2}) in area. According to the Topographical Dictionary of Ireland, published by Samuel Lewis in 1837, it then had approximately 5800 inhabitants.

== See also ==
- List of civil parishes of County Antrim
