= An Túr Gloine =

Art studio

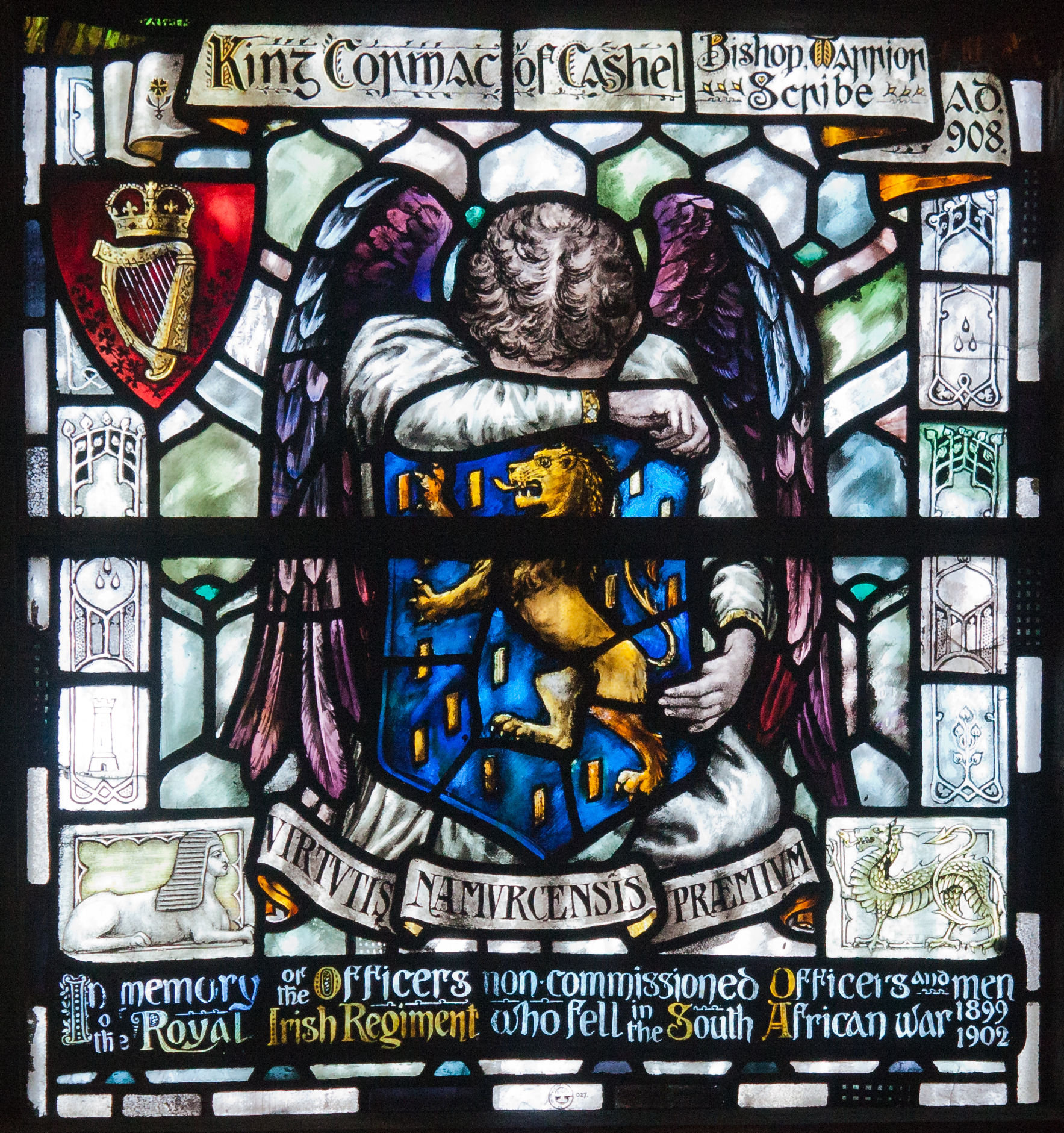
Memorial window from St Patrick's Cathedral, Dublin executed by An Túr Gloine.

An Túr Gloine (pronounced [ənˠ ˌt̪ˠuːɾˠ ˈɡlˠɪnʲə]; Irish for "The Glass Tower") was a cooperative studio for stained glass and opus sectile artists from 1903 until 1944, based in Dublin, Ireland.

== History ==
An Túr Gloine was conceived of in late 1901, and established January 1903 at 24 Upper Pembroke Street, Dublin, Ireland on the site of two former tennis courts. It was active throughout the first half of the 20th century. Affiliated artists included Michael Healy, Evie Hone, Beatrice Elvery, Wilhelmina Geddes, Catherine O'Brien, Kathleen Quigly, and founder Sarah Purser. The original impetus for the project, spurred by the Irish cultural activist Edward Martyn, was the building of the Roman Catholic cathedral in Loughrea, County Galway, which was to become St Brendan's. Purser and Martyn hoped to provide an alternative to the commercial stained glass imported from England and Germany for Irish churches and other architectural projects. Purser's knowledge of French and English medieval glass, together with her social connections and organizational skills, were crucial to the success of the cooperative.

Historian Patrick Maume, writing in Fortnight magazine in 1998, noted that the artistic community centred on An Tur Gloine could be "seen as attempting to recreate the ethos of the mediaeval craftsman's guild."

In 1904, a writer for The Studio, a magazine of fine and applied art, called the recently formed An Túr Gloine "perhaps the most noteworthy example of the newly awakened desire to foster Irish genius," describing it as "at once a craft school, where instruction in every detail connected with the designing and production of stained glass is given to the workers, and a factory from which some beautiful work has already appeared." The writer also extolled the economic benefits of an Irish glass industry to supply churches.

The studio is regarded as part of the Arts and Crafts Movement, but was infused also with the contemporary spirit of Irish revivalism and drew on the artistic tradition of Celtic manuscript illumination. Ireland became an internationally renowned center of stained-glass art at this time, to a large extent as a result of An Túr Gloine. The studio was run by Purser until 1940, who was then succeeded by Catherine O'Brien who ran it until 1944. After which time O'Brien bought the studio and leased a large section of it to Patrick Pollen.

== Relation to literary culture ==
A commission for An Túr Gloine occasioned an outburst of criticism in Samhain magazine from the Irish poet W. B. Yeats on how the "bourgeois mind is never sincere in the arts":

Galway convent a little time ago refused a fine design for stained glass, sent from Miss Sarah Purser's studio, because of the personal life in the faces and in the attitudes, which seemed to them ugly, perhaps even impious. They sent to Miss Purser an insipid German chromo-lithograph, full of faces without expression or dignity, and gestures without personal distinction, and Miss Purser, doubtless because her enterprise was too new, too anxious for success, to reject any order, has carried out this ignoble design in glass of beautiful colour and quality.

== Works ==
The following table provides examples of work commissioned from the studio or created by individual artists associated with An Túr Gloine.

Subject	Site	Location	Artist
World War I memorial window	St. Bartholomew's Church	Ottawa, Canada	Wilhemina Geddes
Windows	Abbey Theatre	Dublin	An Túr Gloine
Door panel depicting a triad of candles symbolizing truth, knowledge, and wisdom	St. Enda's School, Cullenswood House	Ranelagh, Dublin	Sarah Purser and An Túr Gloine
St. Fanchea and St. Enda window	St. Brigid, Faughart Parish Church	Kilcurry, Ireland	Sarah Purser and An Túr Gloine
Katharine Temple Emmet & Richard Stockton Emmet Memorial Window	Christ Church	Pelham Manor, New York, America	Sarah Purser
Windows, three on the south side, one on the north aisle	St. Ann's Church, Dawson Street	Dublin	Wilhemina Geddes; north aisle with Ethel Rhind
World War I Memorial Window ('Fortitude')	Wesley College, Dublin (St. Stephens Green)	Dublin	Alfred Ernest Child
Windows, at least five	St Peter's Church, Wallsend	North Tyneside, England	Michael Healy and Ethel Rhind

== Sources ==
- Maume, Patrick (1 July 1998). Moffat, Chris (ed.). "Ecclesiastical Revivalry - The Politics of Church Art in the Celtic Revival". Fin de Siecle - Arts and Crafts and the Celtic Revival in Ireland - Northern Perspectives (Fortnight supplement). No. 372. Belfast: Fortnight Publications. pp. 8–9. ISSN 0141-7762. JSTOR 25559532.
- Teehan, Virginia; Heckett, Elizabeth (2005). The Honan Chapel: A Golden Vision. Cork: Cork University Press. ISBN 978-1-8591-8346-5.
