= Ethel Rhind =

Irish stained-glass and mosaic artist

- Born: 1 December 1877; Arrah, Bihar, India
- Died: 6 March 1952 (aged 74); Dún Laoghaire, County Dublin, Ireland
- Education: Belfast School of Art, Dublin Metropolitan School of Art
- Known for: Stained-glass and mosaic design

Ethel Rhind (1 December 1877 – 6 March 1952) was an Irish stained-glass and mosaic artist, who was associated with An Túr Gloine.

== Life and education ==
Rhind was born on 1 December 1877 in Arrah, Bihar, India. Her father was Robert Hunter Rhind, a civil engineer born in Edinburgh, who was working in the Indian civil service. Her mother, Hannah Rhind (née Tate), was from Whiteabbey, County Antrim, and was a relative of the Gore-Booth family of Lissadell House, County Sligo.

Rhind was educated at Londonderry High School, and later the Belfast School of Art where she earned an art teacher's certificate in 1900. In 1902, she was awarded a scholarship to study mosaic under Miss Holloway at the Dublin Metropolitan School of Art. Rhind was an early student of Alfred E. Child, who taught stained glass craft. Her student work was exhibited at the Irish International Exhibition in 1907.

She entered Sarah Purser's An Túr Gloine in 1907–1908 to work on stained glass and opus sectile. Rhind died 6 March 1952 in a nursing home in Dún Laoghaire.

== Artistic work ==
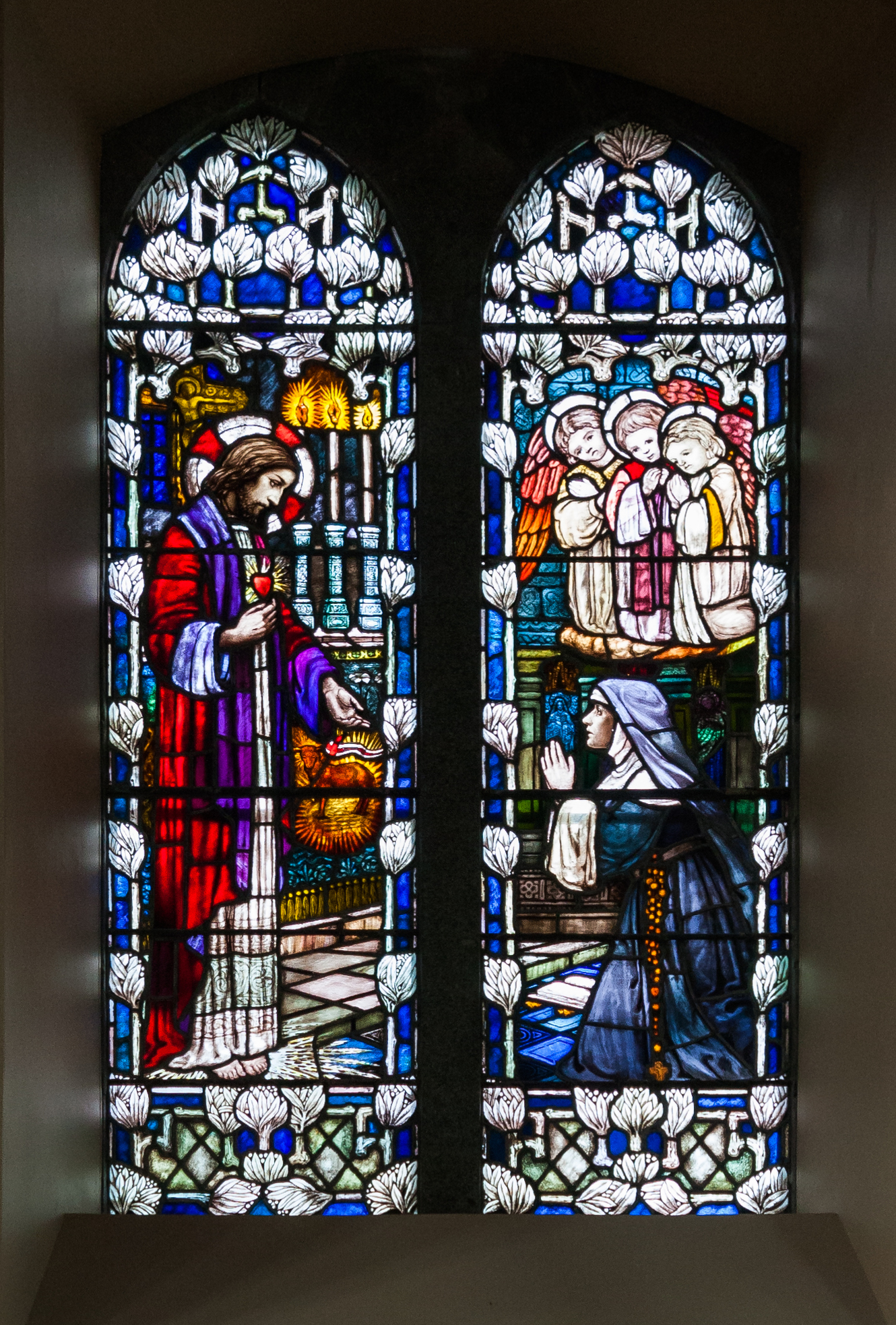
Stained glass window by Ethel Rhind in Sacred Heart Church, Castletownbere. This work was created in 1910 and depicts Margaret Mary Alacoque receiving the revelation of the Sacred Heart.

Some of her earliest work is in the window Harmony and Fortitude in Lissadell church for the Gore-Booths which was created in 1907. In 1908 she won first prize at the Royal Dublin Society for her window in the Old Court chapel, Strangford, County Down. Most of her work was for Church of Ireland churches, though she also designed for the Presbyterian church, York Road, Dún Laoghaire, The Honan chapel, University College Cork, and her St Carthage series. During this time, she lived with her sister Sophia, who was a secretary with the Royal Irish Academy, in Dublin. When Wilhelmina Geddes left An Túr Gloine due to ill health, Rhind completed her designs. Rhind also worked closely with Catherine O'Brien. From 1917, she was a member of the Guild of Craft Workers.

Her work in the opus sectile medium was seen as very progressive and her most significant contribution to the reputation of An Túr Gloine. Some of her most noted works in were the stations of the cross made in St Enda's church, Spiddal, County Galway (1916–28), the stations made in Loughrea cathedral (1929–33), and her 1921 war memorial Archangel Michael on the exterior wall of All Saints Church, Grangegorman, Dublin. Her work incorporated stone, glass, and shell, rather than the more traditional tiny tiles or tesserae.

The 1912 tapestry, Smuainteach, was designed by Rhind and woven by the Dún Emer Guild in Dundrum, which is in the collections of the National Museum of Ireland. Her designs for both stained glass and opus sectile were featured at the Arts and Crafts Society of Ireland in 1910, 1917, and 1921. Two of her pieces of stained glass are in the United States, one in the Sacred Heart Convent chapel in Newton, Massachusetts, and the second in Brophy College Chapel, Arizona. Rhind retired from the studio in 1939.
