= Alfred E. Child =

English stained glass artist

Alfred Ernest Child
- Born: 1875; London, United Kingdom
- Died: 1939 (aged 63–64); Dublin, County Dublin, Ireland
- Education: Central School of Arts and Crafts; Dublin Metropolitan School of Art
- Known for: Stained Glass

Alfred Ernest Child (1875–1939) was an English stained glass artist, a lecturer in the Dublin Metropolitan School of Art and was associated with An Túr Gloine.

== Life and education ==
Alfred Ernest Child was born in London in 1875. As a young man, he left school to work in an accountant's office, working there for a year when he decided to pursue a career in the arts. He studied in the Central School of Arts and Crafts having won a scholarship, and went on to study stained glass under Christopher Whall as an assistant glass painter and designer. Child was married to Annie, with whom he had two sons and a daughter. Child died of stroke in Dublin in 1939.

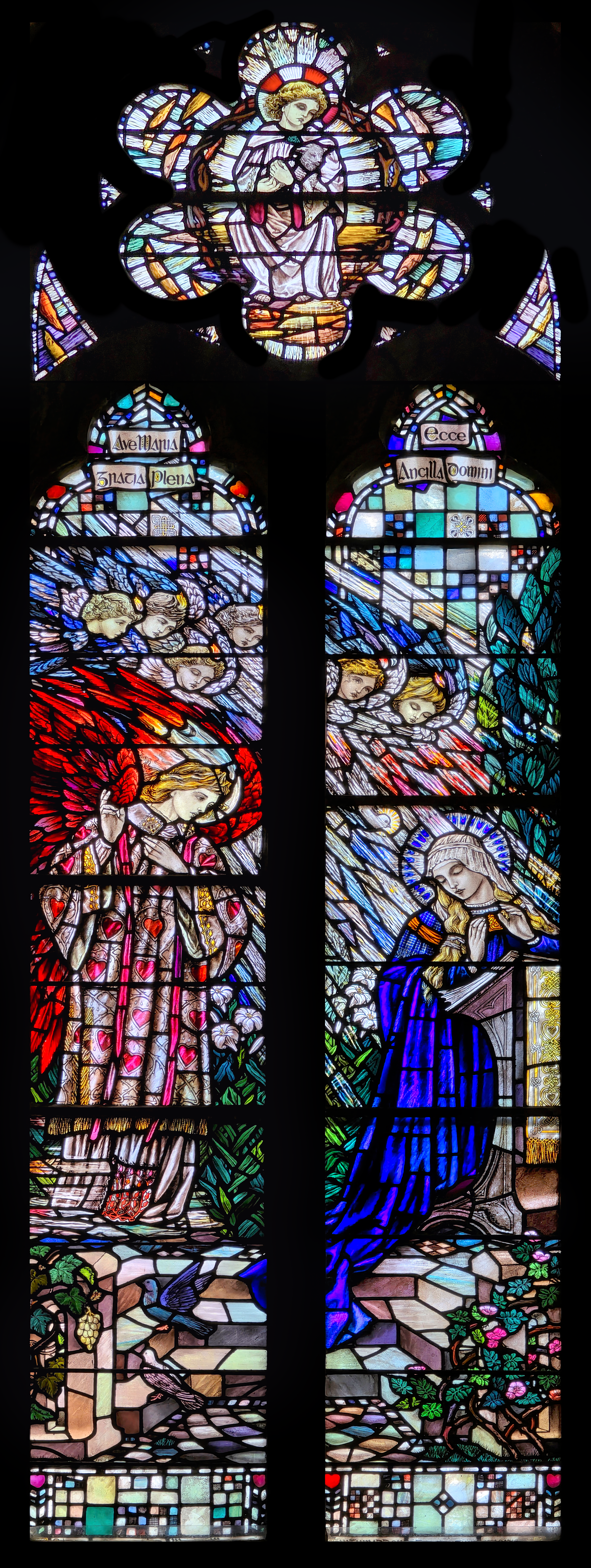
The Annunciation at St. Brendan's Cathedral Loughrea

== Artistic work ==
Child was invited to Dublin in September 1901 to teach in the Dublin Metropolitan School of Art, forming a class in stained glass within two months. Whilst working in the School he tutored a generation of Irish stained-glass artists which included Harry Clarke, Ethel Rhind, Catherine O’Brien, Michael Healy and Evie Hone. It is this influence is seen as his largest contribution to Irish stained glass art.

Child became the manager of An Túr Gloine upon its opening in 1903. Child was a member of Guild of Irish Art Workers and exhibited with the Arts and Crafts Society of Ireland. Amongst the windows that he designed are those at Loughrea Cathedral, the Honan Chapel at University College Cork, the Unitarian Church, Dublin and St Mary’s Church, Haddington Road. Though his eyesight began to fail in 1937, he was associated with the studio until his death 1939.
