= Wilhelmina Geddes =

Irish stained glass artist

Wilhelmina Geddes HRUA
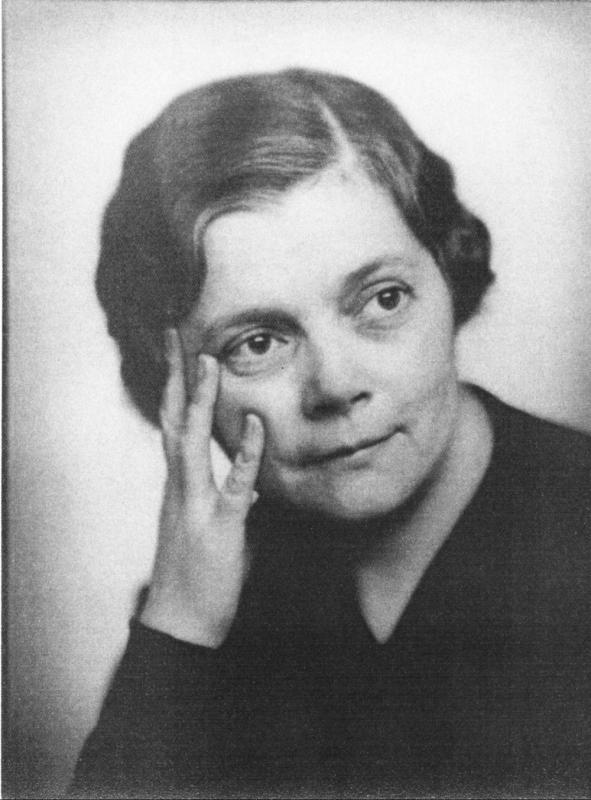
- Born: 25 May 1887; Leitrim, County Leitrim, Ireland
- Died: 10 August 1955 (aged 68); London, United Kingdom
- Resting place: Cronmoney Cemetery, Ballyclare, County Antrim
- Education: Belfast School of Art; Dublin Metropolitan School of Art
- Known for: stained glass design

Wilhelmina Geddes HRUA (25 May 1887 – 10 August 1955) was an Irish stained glass artist who was an important figure within the Irish Arts and Crafts movement and also the twentieth-century British stained glass revival. Notable works include windows at St Bartholomew's (Ottawa, Canada), St Peter's Church (Lampeter, Wales), and the King Albert Memorial Window, St Martin's Cathedral (Ypres, Belgium).

== Early life ==
Wilhelmina Margaret Geddes was born on her maternal grandparent's farm at Drumreilly Cottage in Leitrim on 25 May 1887. She was the eldest of four children, three girls and a boy, of William Geddes (c.1852-1916) and his wife Eliza Jane Stafford (1863-1955). The family, who migrated to Ireland from Scotland, had mainly been farmers. Her father, a Methodist, who was born near his father's farm at Tandragee, County Armagh, emigrated to America as a young man, working as a labourer for the railway construction business. This served a useful purpose as he had worked as a site engineer at the Cavan, Leitrim and Roscommon Railway Company. When she was still an infant her parents moved to their native home in Belfast, so her father could set up in business as a building contractor.

== Education ==
Geddes began drawing subjects from life and nature from the age of four. She learnt first how to draw from the school mistress in Ayrshire, where her father occasionally went shooting. She began her studies at Methodist College Belfast along with her three younger sisters. She later moved to the Belfast School of Art. Geddes was encouraged by Rosamond Praeger, a sculptor from County Down, to continue with her studies. Geddes was accepted as a student to study at the Belfast School of Art, Ulster University. This is where Geddes adapted and improved her style and was introduced to a professional standard of art work.

Whilst still studying at the Belfast School of Art, Geddes took part in the Arts and Crafts Society of Ireland's fourth exhibition. For this exhibition, Geddes contributed a glowingly coloured illustration of the book Cinderella Dressing the Ugly Sister (Dublin City Gallery), which she had created. It was at this exhibition that Geddes' work was spotted by Sarah Purser, a well established painter seeking newly trained students to introduce to stained glass artistry. Purser, who went on to be Geddes' lifelong mentor, invited the young Geddes to join her in Dublin, working under the established stained glass artist William Orpen.

Geddes contributed a watercolour illustration of a Ballad Seller with the Belfast Art Society in 1907. She was elected as an Associate of the Belfast Art Society's successor, the Ulster Academy of Arts, in 1933 before promotion to Honorary Academician in 1935. Geddes showed five illustrations in the 1911 Oireachtas Exhibition. It was some twenty-one years before she returned to the Oireachtas when she exhibited three cartoons and three sketches for stained glass in 1932.

== Career ==
Geddes joined Purser at the acclaimed stained glass workshop called An Túr Gloine in 1910. The workshop was held in Dublin's Metropolitan School of Art. It was here that Geddes discovered her passion for the craftsmanship of stained glass artistry and created her most important works.

During her early years at An Túr Gloine, "Geddes’s originality shone out, and important commissions came from St Ann’s Church in Dawson Street, Dublin and the Presbyterian Church in Rathgar. Dogged by illness, she returned to Belfast before 1916 and lived between there and Dublin until moving in 1925 (as she had long wanted) to work in London at the Glass House in Fulham." While working at the Glass House Geddes instructed the Irish painter and stained glass artist Evie Hone.

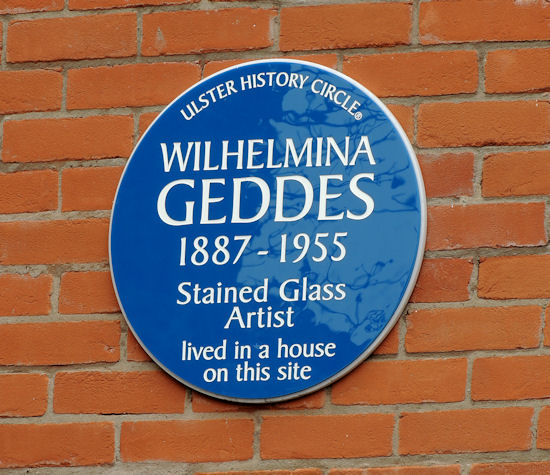
Plaque placed by the Ulster Historic Society at Geddes residence, Marlbourough Park South.

Her work was considered pioneering and represented a rejection of the Late Victorian approach. She created a new view of men in stained glass windows, portraying them with close-shaven crew cuts. "The muscularity and tension of her portraiture is matched by the radical design of her constructions. Ambitious large-scale projects, as at the cathedral in Ypres, are equalled by the drama of smaller-scale work at Wallasey (Lancashire) and Wallsend (Northumberland), or war memorial windows in obscure country churches."

=== War Memorial Window, St Bartholomew's Church, Canada 1919 ===
This window was unveiled at St Bartholomew's by HRH the Prince of Wales. The window itself was commissioned by Prince Arthur, Duke of Connaught, in 1916. This piece is located in Ontario, Canada. The window is a memorial piece, depicting images of mourning men and women. Geddes uses primitive colours in her Ottawa Window, the most prominent being yellow and black. It is said by a critic that the colours used in this piece "give the window power and drama while strong, expressive drawing brings out the sense of action and facial expression." An article in Irish Life featured the window on the cover of its Christmas edition in 1919. The writer of the article considered this window to be "one of the artistic triumphs of this century". Geddes completed the entire window in Purser's glass works, Upper Pembroke Street in Dublin, Ireland.

=== St Gabriel Window, All Saints' Church, Dublin 1925 ===
This window was commissioned by Canon Henry Dobbs, who was Chaplain to the Armed Forces. This piece was given by parishioners to commemorate World War I casualties from the congregation, as were two other windows, St Michael and St Raphael. Gabriel stands hard and solid displaying a warrior like, rugged face. He wears a blue and white mantle, which he wraps around himself. In St Gabriel's hands he holds a branch given to him in Paradise and a mirror inscribed with the Greek letter chi, an 'x', which signifies Christ in Greek. Geddes depicts the angel with a red halo and a stony-faced expression. The church in which this window remains is All Saints' Church, Blackrock, County Dublin. In 1996, St Gabriel and St Raphael were reunited in the church's south wall.

=== Lampeter Window, St Peter's Church, Lampeter, Wales 1943 ===
This piece was Geddes' last monumental work in stained glass and is located in the parish church of St Peter's, Lampeter. It measures: 20 ft and 4ins high by 11 ft 6 ins wide. It was commissioned in 1937 by Sir George Arthur Harford as a memorial to his father, Sir John Charles Harford, although Geddes' declining health and the interruptions of the war delayed its completion until 1943, and its installation until 1946. She painted the figures on glass with an incredible clarity and rich use of colour. The three dominant figures portrayed in this piece are: Christ, St Peter and St Andrew. These characters are portrayed to be occupied with thoughts beyond "mortal cares". Geddes herself declared that the window's subject was 'The Prophecy of Esaias' and the 'Calling of Peter and Andrew'. Christ is the central figure and stands taller than St Peter and St Andrew. Christ holds within his hands a pink and gold stone Byzantine church sat upon a rock. This church-on-a-rock symbolism refers to a Bible verse, in Matthew 16:16-19.

== Later life and death ==
Despite the hardships of living in London during World War II, poverty, and ill health, Geddes "designed seventeen full-scale stained glass masterpieces, sixteen of which she completed"

Geddes died on 10 August 1955 in London of a pulmonary embolism. She was buried in Carnmoney Cemetery, County Antrim, along with her mother and sister Ethel. Even after moving to London, Geddes claimed that her native identity never wavered as she says she was always "a Belfast woman".

== Stained glass windows ==
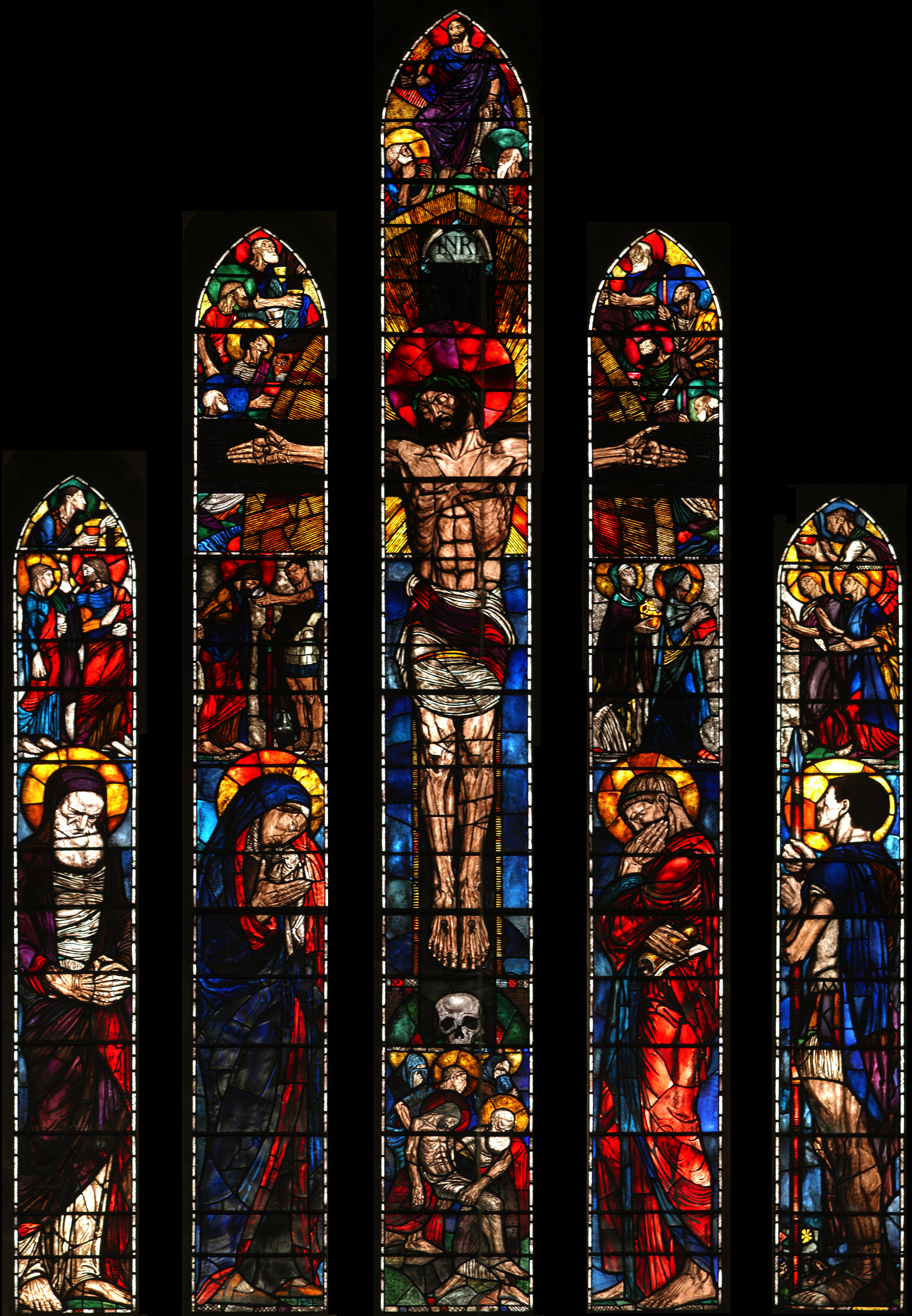
Stained glass window created by Geddes for St Luke's Church, Wallsend

- Angel of Resurrection, St Ninnidh Church, County Fermanagh, Northern Ireland, 1912
- Seaman Memorial Window, St Molaise Church, Monea, Northern Ireland, 1913
- Faith, Hope and Charity Window, Presbyterian Church, Belfast, Northern Ireland, 1913-1914
- Dooner Memorial Windows, St Ann's Church, Dublin, Ireland, 1913
- Margaret Horridge Memorial Window, Holy Trinity Church, Southport, Lancashire, 1914
- Moorehouse Memorial Window, Karori Cemetery, Karori, New Zealand, 1914
- Stewart Memorial Window, Presbyterian Christ Church, Dublin, Ireland, 1914-1916
- Reed Memorial Window, St Anne's Church, Dublin, Ireland 1916
- Cuthbert Memorial Window, Presbyterian Assembly Hall, Belfast, 1916
- War Memorial Window, St Bartholomew's Church, Ottawa, Canada 1919
- Crucifixion Window, St Luke's Church, Wallsend, Tyne & Wear, 1922
- St Patrick’s and Colomba, Larne, County Antrim, Northern Ireland, 1923
- St Brendan Window, Currane Church, Achill, County Mayo, Ireland, 1924
- Belfour Memorial Window, All Saints' Church, Laleham, Middlesex, England, 1925
- The Fate of the Children of Lir, Ulster Museum, Belfast, 1929–30
- Sargent Memorial Window, St Michael Church, Northchapel, West Sussex, 1930
- Wheeler Memorial Window, St Lawrence Church, Otterden, Kent, England, 1933
- Crichton Memorial Window, Egremont Presbyterian Church, Wallasey, Lancashire, 1934
- King Albert Memorial Window, Cathedral of St Martin, Ypres, Belgium, 1938
- Harford Memorial Window, St Peter's Church, Lampeter, Wales, 1943
- Madonna and Child, All Hallows, Greenford, London, 1951-1952
- Lady Chapel windows, St Mildred's, Lee, London, 1951-1954
