= Saint Gobnait (Clarke) =

Stained glass window

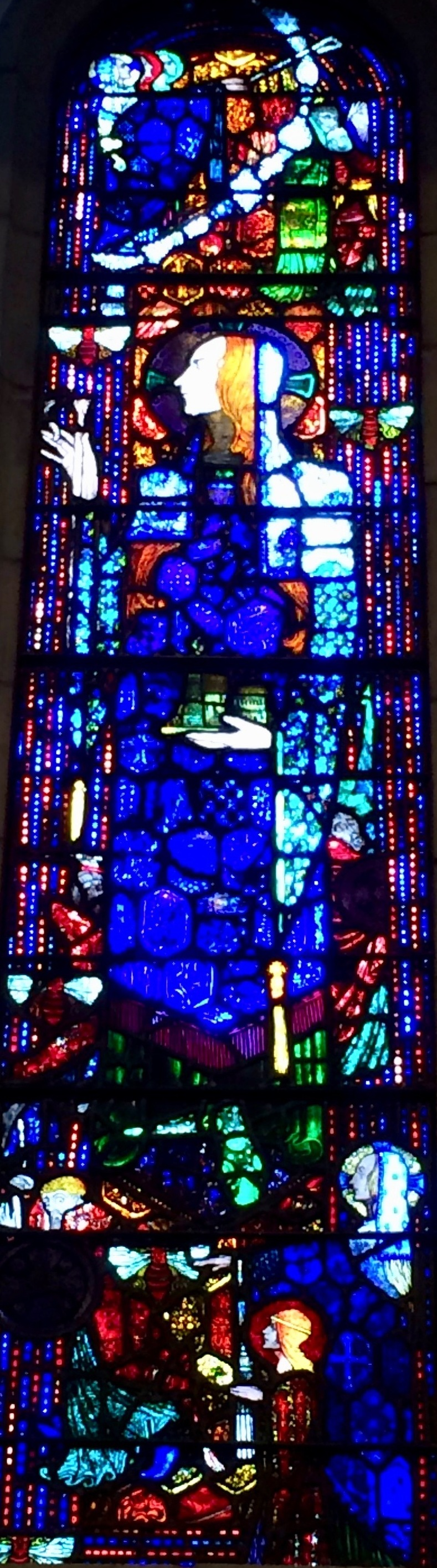
St. Gobnait, Honan Chapel

The Saint Gobnait stained glass window was designed in 1915 and installed in 1916 in the Honan Chapel, Cork by the Irish artist Harry Clarke. It is one of eleven windows he designed for the chapel at the beginning of his career. The commission, and this window in particular, sealed his reputation as an artist of international renown.

Gobnait is shown in half profile, wearing an elaborate royal blue robe, a silver cloak and an extensive veil. The borders of the central glass panel are lined with blue and magenta coloured beads. The background of the window contains honeycomb-shaped lozenges.

== Background ==
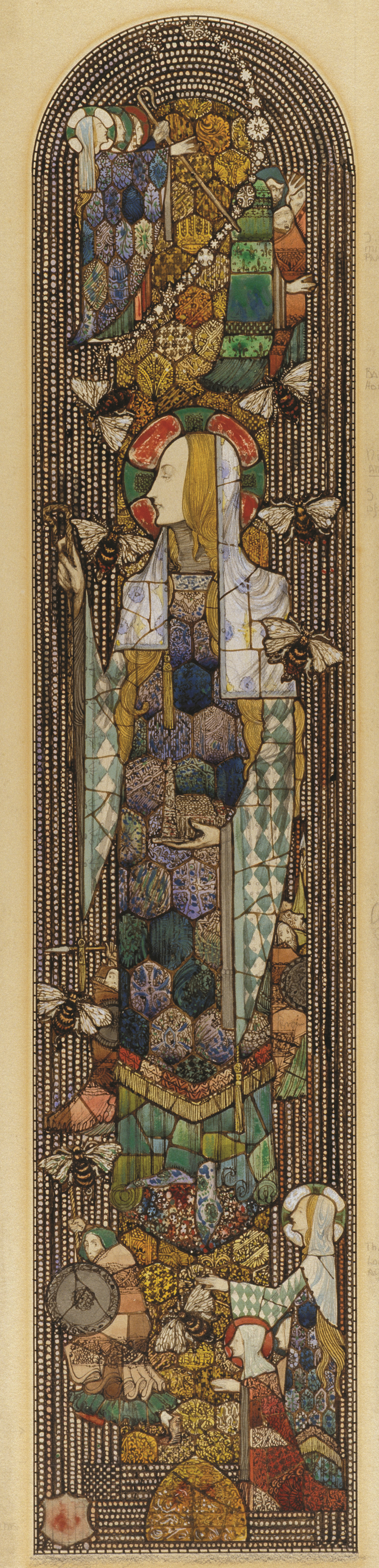
Clarke's original 1914 modello. Corning Museum of Glass, New York. Watercolour, pen, and ink on paper, 73 x 23 cm.

Gobnait was born in County Clare but moved to the island of Inisheer, where she founded a church. Clarke visited the island often in the 1900s and later honeymooned there. According to the art historian Patricia Rogers, Clarke "certainly would have seen the famous ruins of Gobnait's first church on Inisheer, and these may have attracted him to the subject of this saint." Gobnait became a healer and established a convent in Ballyvourney, County Cork.

The design and building of the Honan Chapel was overseen by John O'Connell, a leading member of the Celtic revival and Arts and Crafts movements. O'Connell sought to construct a chapel that was evoked the aesthetic style found in Ireland and Britain between the 7th and 12th centuries and was "designed and fashioned on the same lines and on the same plan as those which their forefathers had built for their priests and missioners all over Ireland nearly a thousand years ago." According to art critic Kelly Sullivan, the window succeeds in presenting "a particularly Irish idiom of natural imagery".

Clarke and his assistant Kathleen Quigly completed the window's modello under considerable time pressure over five weeks in 1914, during the offer period for the Honan commission and when Clark was still a largely unknown artist. A study was made in pencil, pen, inks, and watercolour on board now at the Corning Museum of Glass. The design was transferred to glass, when each panel was cut up, waxed and painted. The final window is the largest in the Honan. This expensive process was funded by his father and his friend Augtin Malloy.

== Description ==
St. Gobnait is shown in profile with a pale, thin and ascetic face and is given individualistic, unmistakable features. She wears royal blue and purple robes adorned with lozenged jewels, a veil and a silver cloak. The window's borders are lined with beaded decorations in ruby and blue. Her clothing draws from Léon Bakst's costume for Ida Rubinstein's 1911 performance of "Le Martyre de saint Sébastien". Highly detailed and complex floral patterns run along the outer borders of each of the window's registers.

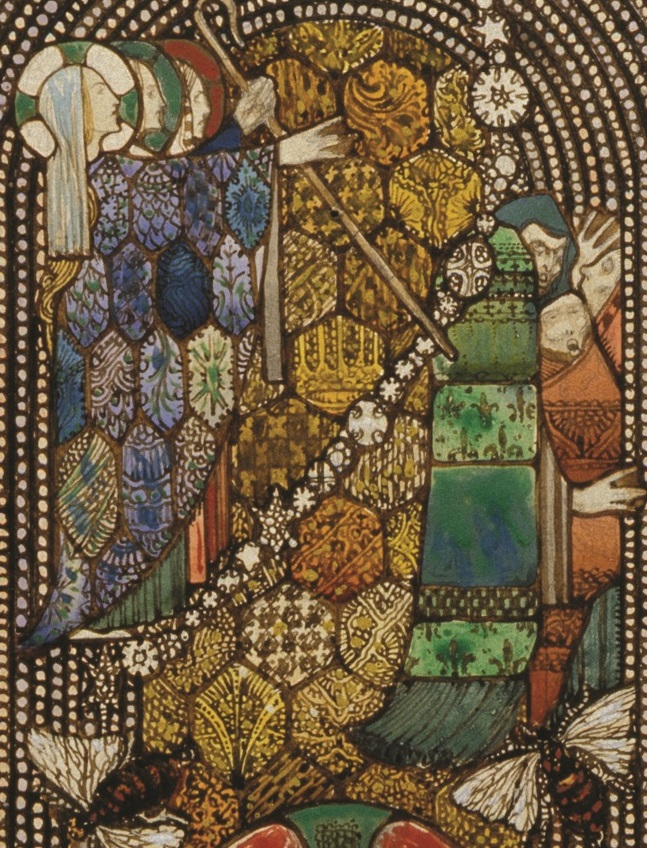
Preparatory study, detail of the upper panel

Gobnait is known as the patron saint of bees, and she is shown with bees hovering around her face, with a honeycomb at her feet, along with bees chasing the thieves said to have raided her church. In this story, she unleashed bees against her attackers; Clarke shows "giant bees and tiny figures of frightened robbers peering out anxiously behind the blue-robed saint, whose pointed, impassive profile, unnaturally long slim hands and geometrically stylised body give her an otherworldly, non-human appearance".

In the upper panel, the victims of a plague fled to her for sanctuary and protection. The image shows her drawing the sign of the cross on the road and marking a line around her church with her crosier. According to O'Connell, the line represents the point beyond which "the infection did not come, so that none of those who lived and served with her suffered from the plague."

== Influences ==
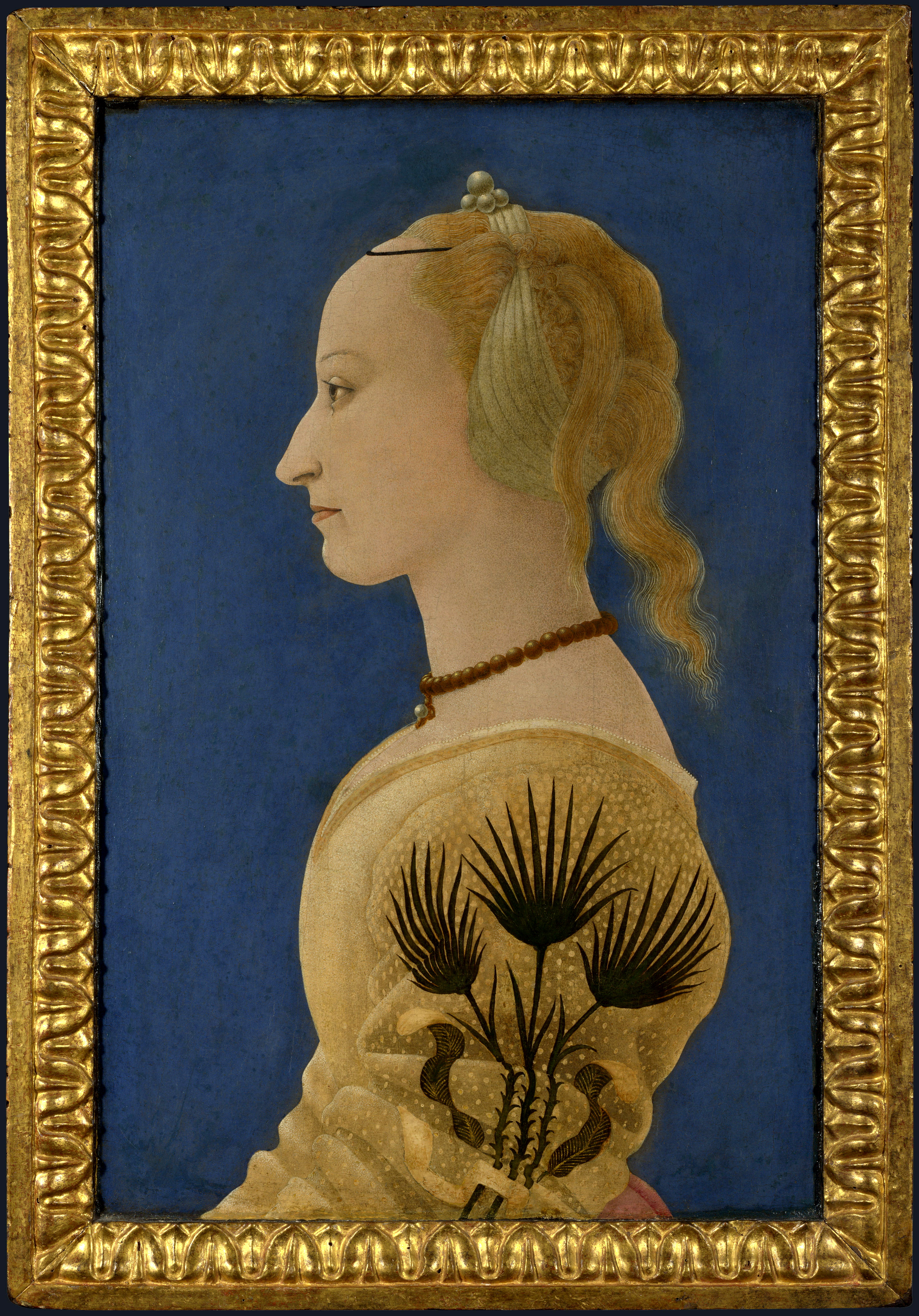
Alesso Baldovinetti, Portrait of a Lady in Yellow, c. 1465. National Gallery, London

Clarke admired Gustav Klimt, whose influence can be seen in the central panel's flatness. According to Michael J. O'Kelly, Clarke's evokes "three-dimensional human expression" using only Gobnait's face and hands, while all other details, including her robes and the floral background, are two-dimensional and flat.

The pose of her outstretched right arm draws from both Beardsley and Alesso Baldovinetti's c. 1465 Portrait of a Lady in Yellow. The similarity to Baldovinetti's portrait is especially apparent in her tightly pulled-back hair, high forehead and the profile of her nose. (Gobnait is described in early accounts as a "sharp-beaked nun, and according to writer Frank McNally, Clarke gives her nose "the trajectory of an Olympic ski-jump".)

== Reception ==
The window was described by the art historian Virginia Teehan as "kaleidoscopically sumptuous" and "filled with a wealth of art historical allusions, often unexpected". According to the Irish novelist E. Œ. Somerville, it conjures late 19th century decadence in its resemblance to an Aubrey Beardsley–type female face, which "though horrible [is] so modern and conventionally unconventional ... [Clarke's] windows have a kind of hellish splendour."

In 1917, Seán Keating produced a modernist oil on canvas painting titled "Thinking Out Gobneh", which shows Clarke working on a design for the window.
