= Honan Chapel =

Catholic church at University College Cork, Ireland

- Collegiate Chapel of St. Finbarr
- Séipéal Uí Eonáin
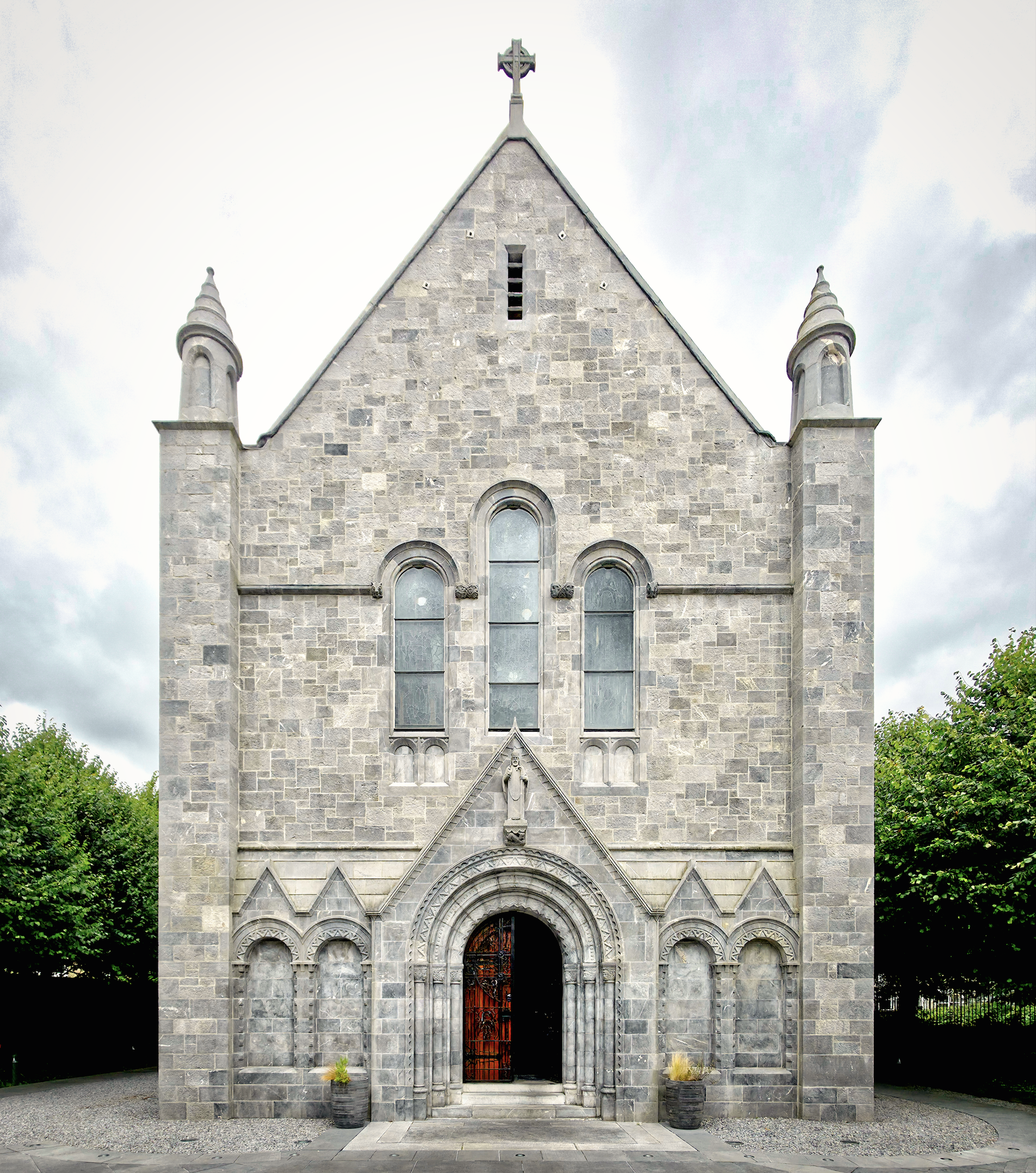
- West façade

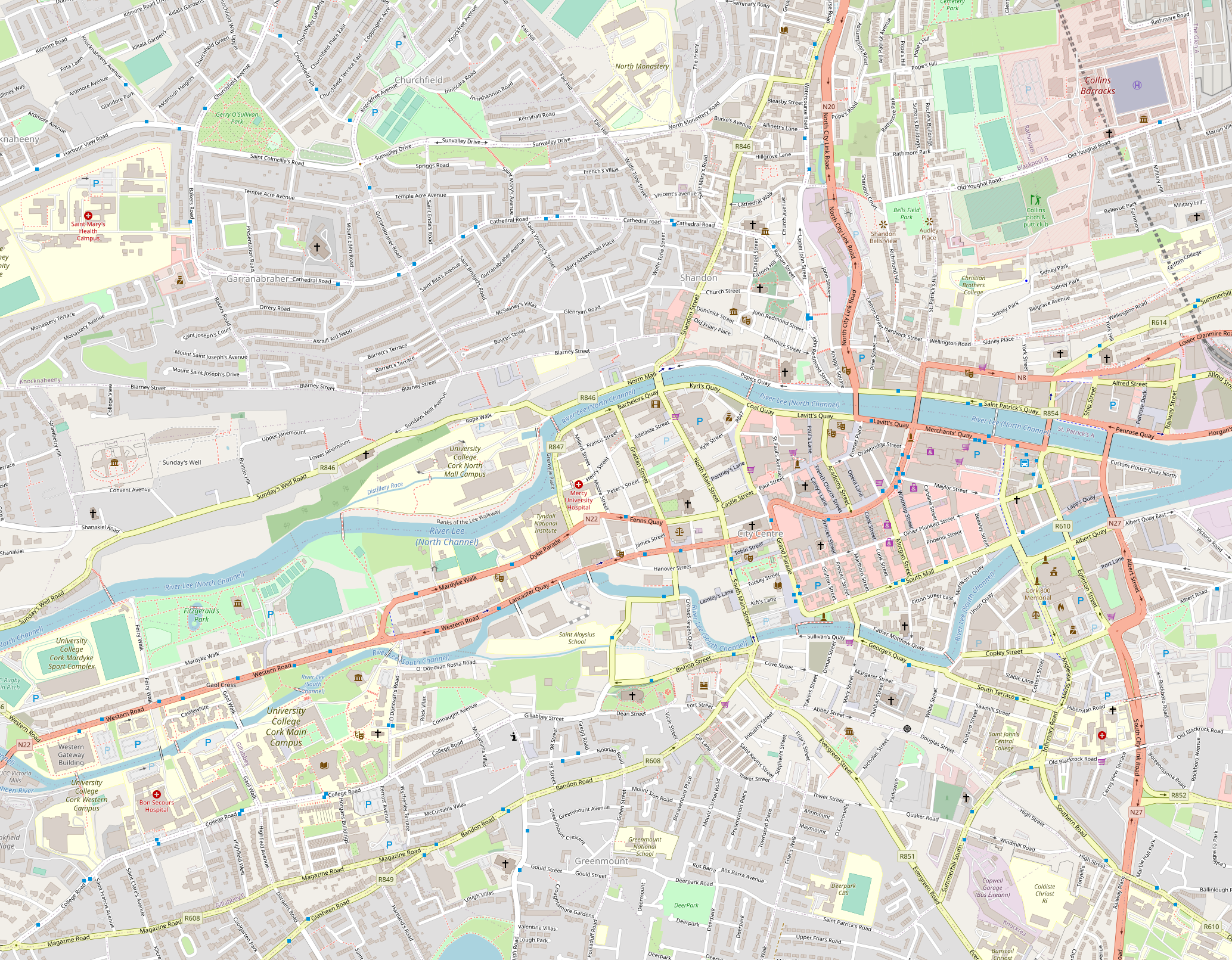
- Location within Cork Central
- 51.8935°N 8.4895°W
- Location: University College Cork, Cork
- Country: Ireland
- Denomination: Catholic Church
- Website: honanchapel.ie

History
- Dedication: Finbarr of Cork

Architecture
- Architect(s): James F. McMullen; John O'Connell
- Architectural type: Romanesque Revival; Celtic Revival
- Style: Arts and Crafts movement Art Nouveau
- Groundbreaking: 1915
- Completed: 1916

Administration
- Diocese: Roman Catholic Diocese of Cork and Ross

The Honan Chapel (Irish: Séipéal Uí Eonáin, formally Saint Finbarr's Collegiate Chapel and The Honan Hostel Chapel) is a small Catholic church built in the Hiberno-Romanesque revival style on the grounds of University College Cork, Ireland. Designed in 1914, the building was completed in 1916 and furnished by 1917. Its architecture and fittings are representative of the Celtic Revival movement and evoke the Insular art style prevalent in Ireland and Britain between the 7th and 12th centuries.

Its construction was initiated and supervised by the Dublin solicitor John O'Connell, a leading member of the Celtic Revival and Arts and Crafts movements. He was funded by Isabella Honan (1861–1913), the last member of a wealthy Cork family, who made a significant donation towards the construction of the chapel. O'Connell oversaw both the design and the commissioning of its building and furnishings, guiding the architect James F. McMullen, the builders John Sisk and Sons, and the numerous craftsmen and artists involved in its artwork.

The Honan Chapel is known for its interior which is designed and fitted in a traditional Irish style, but with an appreciation of contemporary trends in international art. Its furnishings include a mosaic flooring, altar plate, metalwork and enamels, liturgical textiles and sanctuary furnishings, and especially its nineteen stained glass windows. Of these, fifteen depict Irish saints, the remainder show Jesus, Mary, St. Joseph and St. John. Eleven were designed and installed by Harry Clarke, while the other eight are by A. E. Child, Catherine O'Brien and Ethel Rhind of An Túr Gloine cooperative studio. In 1986, the sculptor Imogen Stuart was commissioned to oversee the installation of a new altar and other carvings, furnishings and fittings.

== Background and construction ==
The original Honan Hostel

Population growth and urbanisation in early 20th-century Ireland led to the development of a number of suburbs around Cork, which necessitated the building of churches to serve these new areas; the Honan Chapel was the first church to be built in Cork in the new century. Its genesis was rooted in a longstanding educational disagreement between the Protestant and Catholic hierarchies. Queen's College Cork (today known as University College Cork, or UCC) was incorporated in 1845 as part of a nationwide series of new universities known as the Queen's Colleges. Although the Colleges were intended to be non-denominational, the lack of provision for any religious instruction made them unacceptable to the Irish Catholic bishops, who strongly discouraged Catholics from attending, and in 1851 founded the Catholic University of Ireland. In 1911, the Queen's Colleges continued as constituent colleges of the new university. The Irish Universities Act 1908 forbade government grants for any "church, chapel, or other place of religious worship or observance"; thus any centre for Catholic students would have to be built with private funding.

Isabella (Belle) Honan was the heir to the fortune of a wealthy Catholic family of butter merchants. When Honan died in 1913, she left £40,000 (equivalent to £3.1 million in 2019) to the city of Cork, including £10,000 which her executor, a Dublin solicitor John O'Connell, was instructed to use to establish a centre of worship for Catholic students in UCC, along with other charitable and educational purposes. These monies became known as the Honan Fund. O'Connell used part of the funds to provide scholarships for Catholic students at UCC and acquired the site of St. Anthony's Hall (also known as Berkeley Hall) from the Franciscan order to develop an accommodation block for male Catholic students known as the Honan Hostel. (Note: The chapel remains standing, but the nearby Honan Hostel (opened 1914) was demolished and replaced by the O'Rahilly Humanities Building in 1998. See UCC Conservation plan)

The Honan Chapel was one of the first modern Irish churches conceived with a thematic design not directed by the clergy. O'Connell entered the priesthood in 1929, after the death of his wife. He was an active member of the Celtic Revival movement, a member of both the Irish Arts and Crafts Committees and the Royal Irish Academy, a fellow of the Royal Society of Antiquaries of Ireland, and chairman of the Arts and Crafts Society of Ireland in 1917. He was deeply interested in ecclesiastical archaeology and sought to construct a chapel that was "something more than merely sufficient ... a church designed and fashioned on the same lines and on the same plan as those which their forefathers had built for their priests and missioners all over Ireland nearly a thousand years ago." He disliked the contemporary, international approach to church building – which he described as "machine made" – preferring a localised and uniquely Irish approach to style and form, which he sought from the most skilled local craftsmen available. He wanted work on the chapel to be "carried out in Cork, by Cork labour and with materials obtained from the City or County of Cork".

O'Connell was assisted in the project by the university president, Sir Bertram Windle. The art historian Virginia Teehan describes O'Connell and Windle as not only devout Catholics, but especially single-minded, creative and energetic. O'Connell employed the firm of Cork architects James Finbarre McMullen and Associates. The building's plans were drawn up in 1914. The contractor John Sisk, was the principal builder and undertook the work at a cost of £8,000. (Note: In 1996, Sisk's company were contractors on the O'Rahilly Building project – a complex built on the site of the former Honan Hostel. See UCC website) The foundation stone, laid on 18 May 1915 by Thomas A. O'Callaghan D.D., Bishop of Cork, records that the chapel was built "by the charity of Isabella Honan for the scholars and students of Munster". It was consecrated on 5 November 1916 and dedicated to Saint Finbarr (also spelled as Finbar, Finnbarr, Finnbar, or Fin Barre), patron saint of Cork and of the Diocese of Cork, on grounds believed to be close to an early Christian monastic site founded by the saint.

== Architecture ==
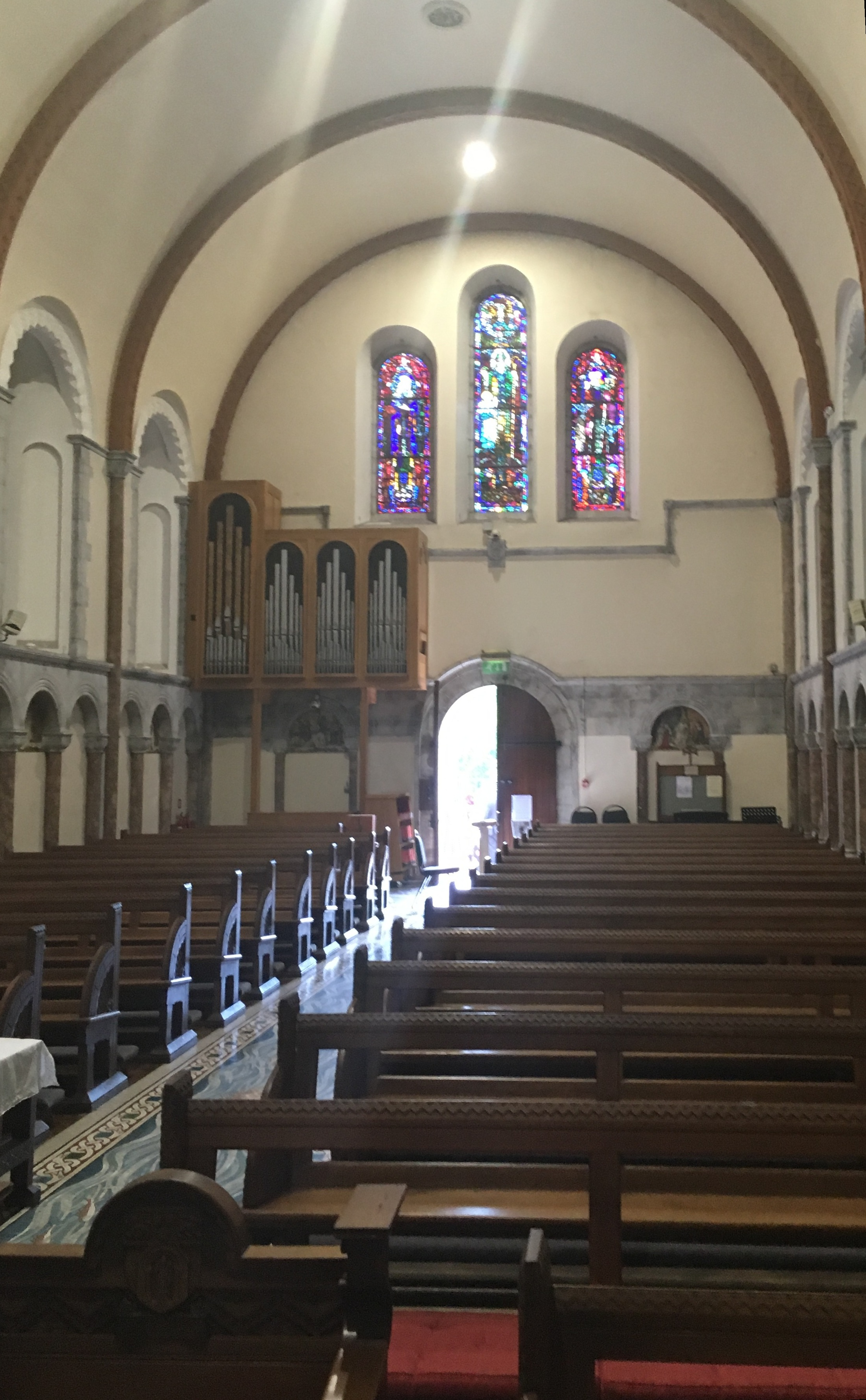
The nave, looking west from the chancel towards the main entrance, with pipe organ in view

O'Connell was mainly inspired by medieval architecture, and the Honan Chapel's architectural style is Hiberno-Romanesque revival. Compared to the decorative and sculpted elements of the interior, its architecture, austere and modest, was described by architectural historian and conservationist Frank Keohane in 2020 as "a little too commonplace and formulaic". The chapel is located on a hillside overlooking the valley of the River Lee, near a site thought to contain one of Finbarr's original churches. The western entrance is approached through wrought iron gates. Its façade was influenced by the 12th-century St. Cronan's Church, Roscrea and features an arcade and gabled wall. The side walls project slightly beyond the gables to form antae, described by Keohane as "surmounted by improbable pinnacles...and probably better regarded as clasping buttresses".

The chapel's interior has a simple layout consisting of a main entrance, a six-bay nave, and a two-bay square chancel. It does not contain either lateral aisles or transepts. The oblong nave measures 72 by 28 feet (22 by 8.5 m). Above, a timber barrel vaulted ceiling ends at the chancel; this is 26 by 18 feet (7.9 by 5.5 m). The nave lacks shrines where worshippers normally light candles or place flowers near devotional images; in this sense, it is similar to a Protestant church. The plain, round bell tower is based on the 12th-century Irish round tower on Teampull Finghin (Fineen's church) in Clonmacnoise, County Offaly.

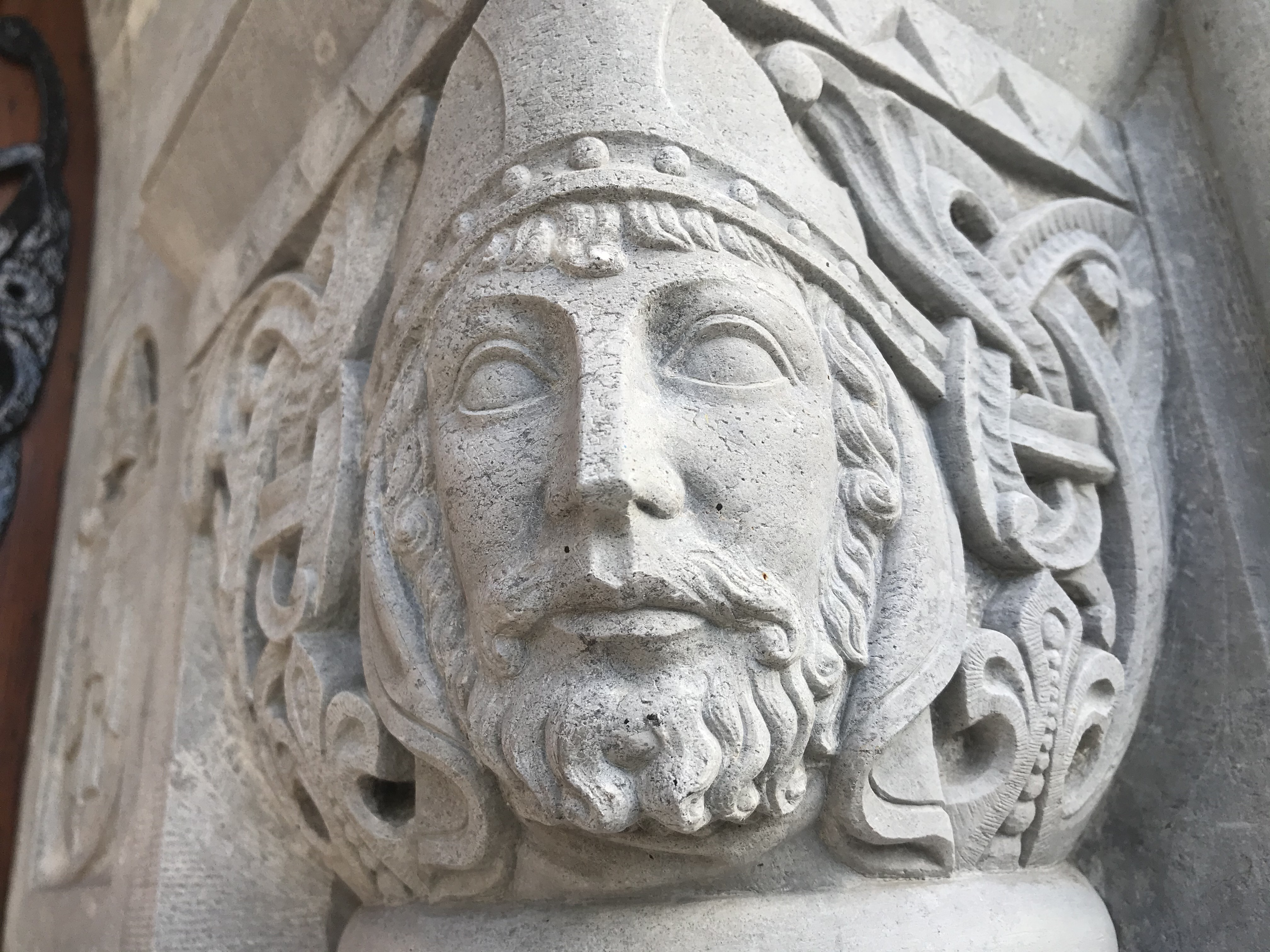
Capital at the chapel's entrance

The mouldings around the tops of the five arches on the west façade are carved with lozenge and pellet decoration. The doorway at one point had an iron grille which has since been removed. It is capped by three limestone ribbed vaults, supported by capitals carrying reliefs of the heads of six Munster saints: Finbarr of Cork, Coleman of Cloyne; Gobnait of Ballyvourney; Brendan of Kerry, Declán of Ardmore and Íte of Killeedy. The reliefs were sculpted by Henry Emery, assisted by students at the nearby Cork School of Art. The tympanum over the door was designed by the sculptor Oliver Sheppard and is dominated by the figure of St. Finbarr, dressed in bishop's vestments.

The timber doors hang on wrought iron strapwork hinges designed by the architect William Scott in (according to the writer Paul Larmour) a "Celticized art nouveau" style. The sacristy is on the north side (left, looking towards the altar) under the bell tower. The building is listed as a protected structure under Section 51 of the Irish Planning and Development Act.

=== Altar ===
Altar carvings, Imogen Stuart, c. 1986

The original altar table was built from a slab of local limestone, chosen as a reaction against the ornately carved Italian marble then in fashion with church builders. It contained silver ornaments fitted by the Dublin gold and silversmith Edmond Johnson and William Egan and Sons of St Patrick's Street, Cork. The altar was positioned on a five-legged table, each leg of which was embedded with an Irish crucifix formed from simple geometric designs, including zig-zag patterns in lozenge and saltire, continuous dots and chevrons.

The altar was replaced in 1986 when the chapel was considered to contravene the requirements of the Second Vatican Council in several ways: it was based on medieval churches and the old rites; it was built with a large spatial divide between the nave and chancel; and the altar was positioned at the very back of the chancel with the priest facing away from the congregation. That year, architect Richard Hurley commissioned several artists to redesign elements of its fixtures. He in turn employed the German-Irish sculptor Imogen Stuart, aided by John and Teresa Murphy, to undertake a redevelopment, including replacement of the altar, pulpit, ceremonial chairs and baptismal font.

Stuart works with other materials but favours wooden carvings, as exemplified by those at the front of the Honan altar. Her replacement altar, constructed in oak, depicts two of the Evangelists. Being movable, it allowed clergy and attendants to be closer to the congregation. Although the altar was first intended for the centre of the chancel at the focal point of the mosaic floor, this arrangement proved to be too far back and was impractical during ceremonies.

=== Tabernacle ===
The tabernacle at the far end of the chancel is the chapel's focal point. It is formed from carved stone and shaped in a manner reminiscent of the arched roofs and entrances of medieval Irish churches. Its upper, triangular panel is set in the gable of the "entrance" and shows the Trinity of God the Father, Jesus crucified, and the Holy Spirit in the form of a dove; around them, two angels carry the sun, moon and other symbols of creation.

The lower, rectangular panel represents the doorway and is set against a background of branches and leaves attached in silver-gilt; it shows the Lamb of God standing on a brightly coloured altar decorated with three-ringed crosses and two angels acting as servers kneeling before it. The dove is surrounded by what Teehan describes as "the deep blue void of Heaven". Here, he is accompanied by flights of angels, carrying instruments of the Passion. The enamel embellishments are by the Irish craftsman and stained glass specialist Oswald Reeves and described by Teehan as the best of his work.

=== Mosaic floor ===
The mosaic flooring was designed and installed by the UK-based artist Ludwig Oppenheimer. It contains symbols of the zodiac, images based on the mythological "River of Life", and depictions of flora, fauna and river scenes. These designs celebrate the Genesis creation narrative and illustrate passages from the Old Testament including the "Benedicite" (also known as "A Song of Creation") from the Book of Daniel, which was sung during the office of lauds on Sundays and feast days. The pattern at the entrance contains a verse from Psalm 148 ("Praise to the Lord from Creation").

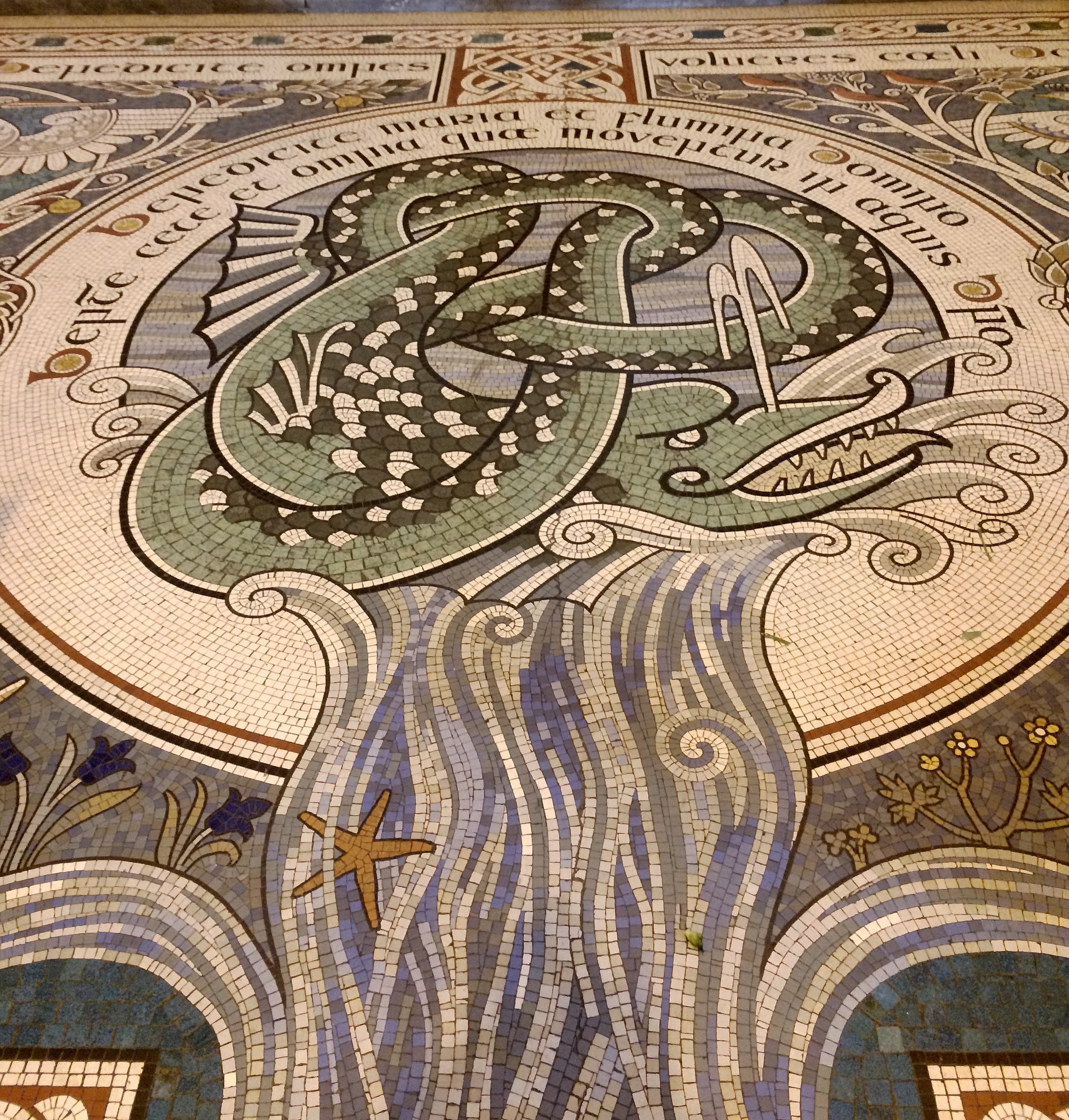
Sea creature

The floor consists of four sections. The main entrance on the west side is dominated by a sunburst and stars surrounded by signs of the zodiac, while the imagery on the aisle depicts the head of a beast, his jaws open to form a river in which fish swim toward the chancel. The east side of the nave shows a large coiled sea creature which is part-serpent, part dragon and part whale. There are stags, deer, sheep and other animals, drinking from a river in a forest, while exotic birds fly around them. The section inside the chancel shows a globe and symbols of creation, including animals, plants and imagery of planets. The four sections are unified by interlaced Celtic and zoomorphic border designs.

The representations of the Sun and night stars at the entrance signify both the new day and the resurrection, as Jesus is traditionally believed to have risen at dawn. Reflecting 12th-century Christian art, the presence of signs of the zodiac symbolises God's dominion over time. The beast's head in the aisle contains a series of tripartite motifs representing the Trinity: spirals, trefoil knots and interlace containing three saltire crosses. The sea creature at the east end of the nave is mentioned in the verse on the floor by the entrance dracones et omnes abyssi ("Dragons and all the depths"); alongside are the words cete et omnia quae moventur in aquis ("whales and all that move in the water"), which in medieval exegesis conjured images of death and reference the Biblical story of Jonah.

The colouring on the floor by and inside the chancel is more subdued and restrained. The imagery depicts a paradise which can be interpreted both as the Garden of Eden and the eternal paradise promised at the end of time. The imagery includes the seasons, the classical elements and symbols of the Resurrection. A similar representation on a 5th-century sarcophagus in the Lateran Museum shows Jonah swimming towards the open jaws of a whale with horned ears and a long, coiled tail. In both examples, the imagery emphasises how Jesus overcame death. This connection is further made by the inclusion of trees in reference to the tree of life, which in mythology grows in paradise and represents Christ, and the surrounding animals at rest, presented as symbols of Christ's followers.

== Stained glass windows ==
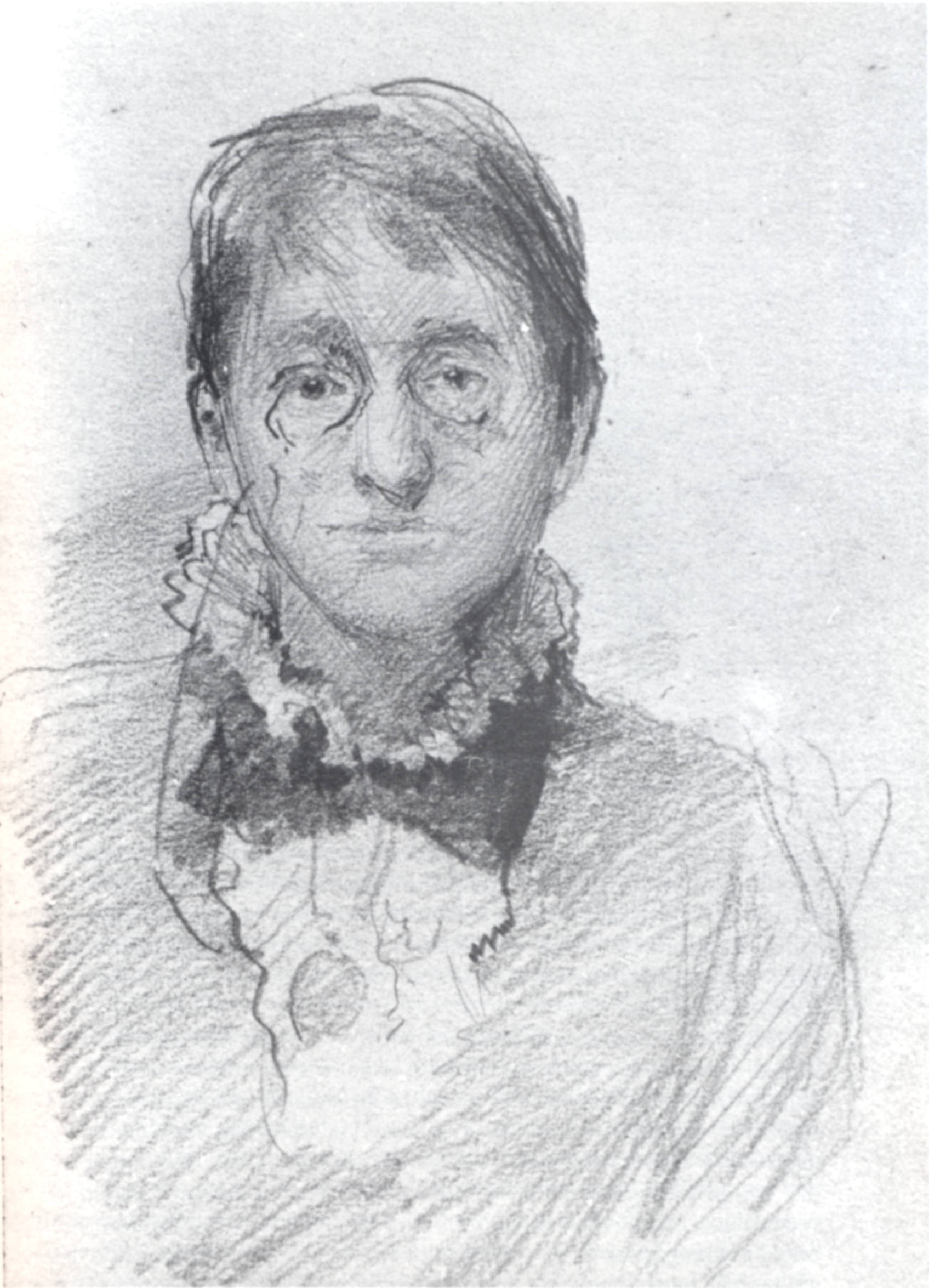
Sarah Purser

O'Connell planned that Sarah Purser's studio, An Túr Gloine, at that time the leading proponent in the production of stained glass in Ireland, would provide all of the windows for the chapel. (Note: Early plans provided for eight windows: Our Lady, Joseph, and John for the chancel, Patrick, Brigid and Columcille for western entrance, and two local saints for the nave.) However, he also commissioned designs by the emerging stained glass artist Harry Clarke, and eventually set him and Purser's studio in competition against each other.

When O'Connell viewed Clarke's cartoon for the Brigid window, he commissioned him to produce five for the chapel. Later, having viewed the design for St Gobnait, he requested a further six from him. Although Purser was upset with the younger artist being awarded the majority of windows, An Túr Gloine ended up producing the original eight planned for them.

Both studios were asked to depict Gaelic saints from the early-medieval, so-called "golden age", of Christianity in Ireland. The nineteen stained glass windows in the chapel are: Our Lord (or "Christ in Majesty") (Child), Mary as Our Lady of Sorrows (Clarke), St. John (O'Brien) and St. Joseph (Clarke). To the right of the chancel looking down are: St. Finbarr (Clarke), St. Albert (Clarke), St. Declan (Clarke), St Ailbe (Child), St Fauchtna (Child) and St Munchin (O'Brien). To the left are: St Ita (Clarke), St Coleman (Child), St. Brendan (Clarke), St Gobnait (Clarke), St Flannan (O'Brien) and St Carthage (Rhind). The windows in the west gable are all by Clarke and represent St Patrick, St Brigid and St Columcille. Six are on each side of the nave; four are within the chancel and three are above the west gable. Eleven were designed by Harry Clarke, and eight by An Túr Gloine. Of the latter, four are by Child, three by Catherine O'Brien, and one by Ethel Rhind. Four windows depict female saints, each in a deep royal blue colour scheme.

Although the windows from each studio contain comparable imagery, their styles differ greatly. Clarke's are highly detailed while An Túr Gloine's are deliberately simple. Both studios displayed their cartoons in Dublin before they were transferred to glass and installed in Cork; both shows were highly praised, and critics debated which group was superior. (Note: Some of Clarke's windows were endangered by nearby fighting during the 1916 Easter Rising in Dublin, and the designs and illustrations for several of his other works were destroyed.) Following the Honan's opening, the art historian and collector Thomas Bodkin wrote that "nothing like Mr Clarke's windows had been seen before in Ireland" and praised their "sustained magnificence of colour ... intricate drawing [and] lavish and mysterious symbolism".

=== Harry Clarke ===
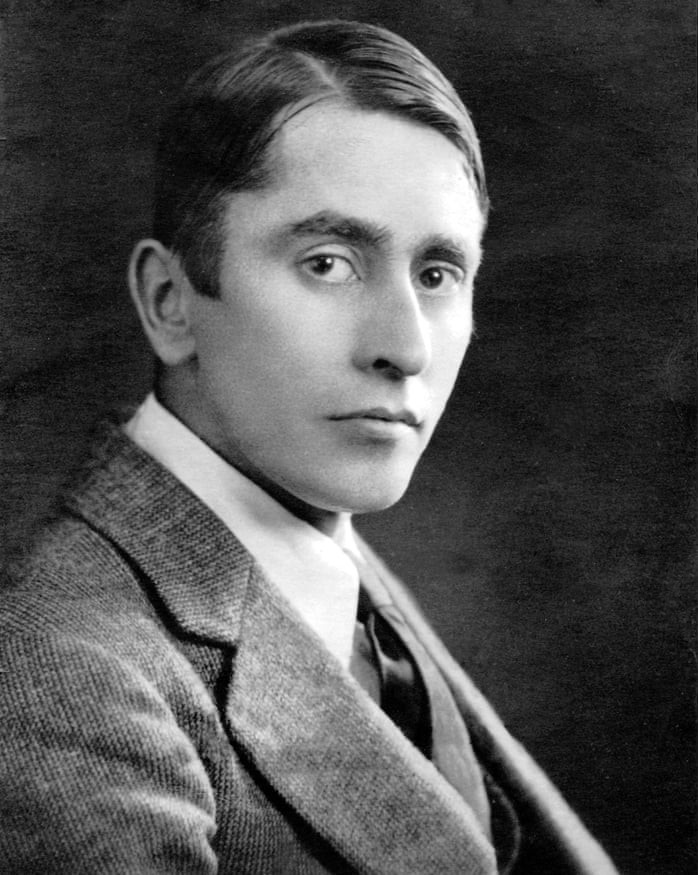
Harry Clarke

Clarke was 21 years old and working in his father's studio when he received the commission from O'Connell. The Honan windows became his first works for a public space and went on to establish his reputation as a significant international artist. (Note: Clarke's career in stained glass peaked early; from the mid-1920s he was preoccupied with legacy commissions left over from his father's workshop.) A contemporary reviewer, comparing the windows to French medieval glass, including those in the Gothic royal chapel of Sainte-Chapelle, described them as "remarkable" and a "distinct advance on anything which has been heretofore done in Ireland in stained glass". Clarke's windows are all single-light (that have just one opening, or vertical panel), each consisting of nine separate panels. They are decorated with simplified, often whimsical forms which are nevertheless highly stylised. The windows contain Celtic designs and motifs, as well as figures and incidents from the life of each saint. The most obvious Celtic embellishments are Mary's red hair and green halo, and Brendan's pampooties. The writer M. J. O'Kelly suggests they evoke "the spirit of the ancient Celt". His designs blend Catholic iconography with motifs from Celtic mythology in a style that draws heavily from Art Nouveau, in particular the darker, fin de siècle works of Gustav Klimt, Aubrey Beardsley and Egon Schiele. His blending of bold and dark colours has been praised, especially for the effects they achieve in morning light.

The designer Percy Oswald Reeves highlighted Clarkes' windows for their "beauty of ... colour, quality and treatment of each piece of glass". His individualised depictions of saints and merging of Catholic and early medieval imagery in a modern and individualised style was at odds with prevailing trends in Irish church art, which were still favouring soft, Raphael-like imagery. According to the scholar Luke Gibbons, Clarke's break "from episcopal interference ... enabled [him] to exploit vernacular traditions of local saints ... that belonged more to legend and folklore ... and whose popular appeal lay outside the highly centralised power of post-famine ultramontane Catholicism."

==== Patrick, Brigid and Columcille ====
Designed in 1915 and the first of Clarke's designs to be completed, the Triadis Thaumaturga windows of Ireland's three patron saints, Brigid, Saint Patrick and Columcille, are positioned on the west wall above the main entrance door. The Patrick window was the first of Clarke's windows. He worked on it for two months beginning on 18 March 1915, the day after his 21st birthday. The window, at 11.6 x 2.10 inches (29.5 x 5.3 cm) the largest in the chapel, is positioned on a base of five lilies, and the deep blue and green hues in the window were achieved using sheets of "antique" pot metal glass which were specially ordered from Chance Glasswork in Birmingham. Patrick wears a bishop's mitre and holds a crosier in one hand and a shamrock in the other. The upper panel shows the saint's birth, the lower panel his death. The borders are decorated with what O'Connell described as "symbols of his learning, his justice, his kingly dignity, of truth, of spiritual fire, of light overcoming darkness, of the serpent typical of the reptiles which he banished from Ireland".

Clark depicts Brigid in a blue cloak and robe, wearing a white headdress decorated with spirals. A large angel wearing a multi-coloured robe is positioned above her, while another four hover at her feet. She holds a representation of Kildare Cathedral, which she is said to have founded. A lamb alongside her represents faith, while the calf signifies innocence. The window was well received by critics when first shown in Clarke's studio in Dublin, and was a key element in his attaining the commission for the Honan windows.

Columcille, whose name translates as "Church Dove" (Colm Cille), lived in the 6th-century and is said to have founded Iona Abbey. Clarke shows him as accompanied by the dove O'Connell describes as his "daily adviser and companion", and the white horse said to have "comforted him in his last days". He is dressed in red, green and blue vestments, and holds a silver and gold mitre.

==== Brendan, Declan and Gobnait ====
Judas Iscariot on the lower register of the St. Brendan window

The Brendan, Declan and Gobnait windows were completed as a group from August to October 1916. Following the Easter Rising that year, Clarke and his wife, Margaret Quincey, had left Dublin to move into a cottage in Mount Merrion, Blackrock. Clarke was under considerable pressure to complete and install the three windows in time for the chapel's 5 November consecration.

St Brendan's window illustrates episodes from the "Voyage of Saint Brendan the Abbot", first recorded c. 900 AD. Brendan wears a robe of blue, purple, green and gold hues, and fishnet gloves. In his left hand he holds a paddle as a reference to his reputation as a seaman and voyager. In the lower panel a grotesque, claw-limbed Judas Iscariot appears, described by the writer Lucy Costigan as a "devilish figure surrounded by red and yellow flames", his lower body transformed into that of a goat. According to legend, Brendan found Judas abandoned on a rock in the ocean, condemned to be tormented for eternity by demons. In another traditional recounting, he arrives at an island referred to as the "Paradise of Birds", where birds sing psalms "as if with one voice" in praise of God; Clarke reflects this in the depictions of birds on the window's borders. As with several of Clarke's windows at Honan, Brendan's panels reflect the artist's taste for the macabre, especially in what Costigan describes as "the woefully metamorphosed fallen angels from the Paradise of Birds island" and "Brendan's sore-tried contemporaries" lining on the window's borders.

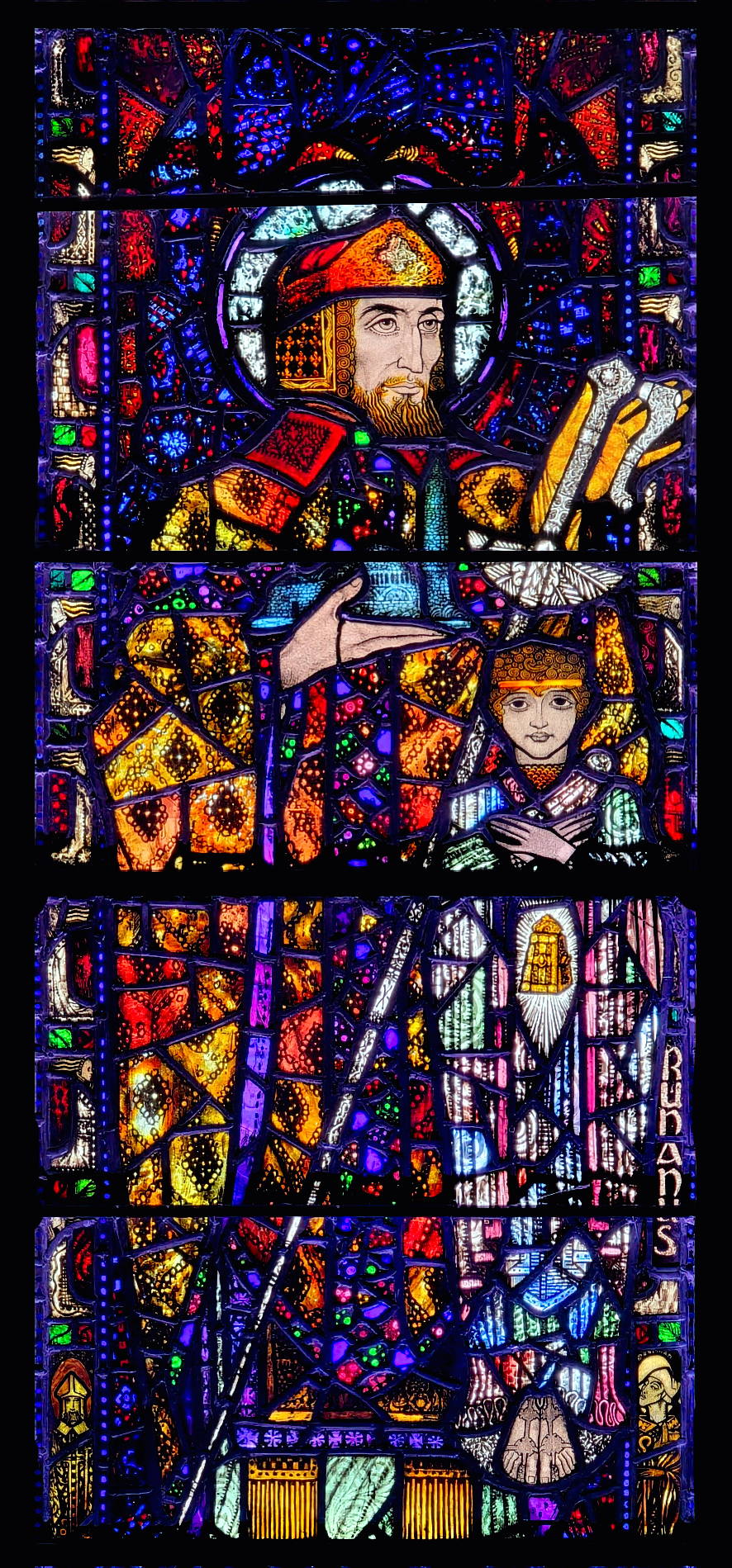
St. Declan window

Declán of Ardmore lived in the 5th century and is the patron saint of the Decii clan of County Waterford. The main image is dominated by mustard yellow hues, with Declán dressed in a hooded cloak in red and gold. He holds a long cross and is surrounded by a patchwork of red, purple, gold and black glass shards. The upper panels detail his return to Ireland from Wales and show the saint carrying a bell, one of his attributes. According to legend, the bell, sent to Declán as a gift from heaven, was inadvertently left behind on a rock, but in response to his prayers, miraculously reappeared in Ardmore. In the lower panel Declán, his assistant Ruamus, and followers are shown meeting Patrick on their return from Rome where Declán had studied and been consecrated bishop. Declán wears a red and gold cloak, and opposite him, Patrick is dressed in green, purple and fawn. On either side of them are Ruamus holding the bell, and an unidentified attendant holding a candle.

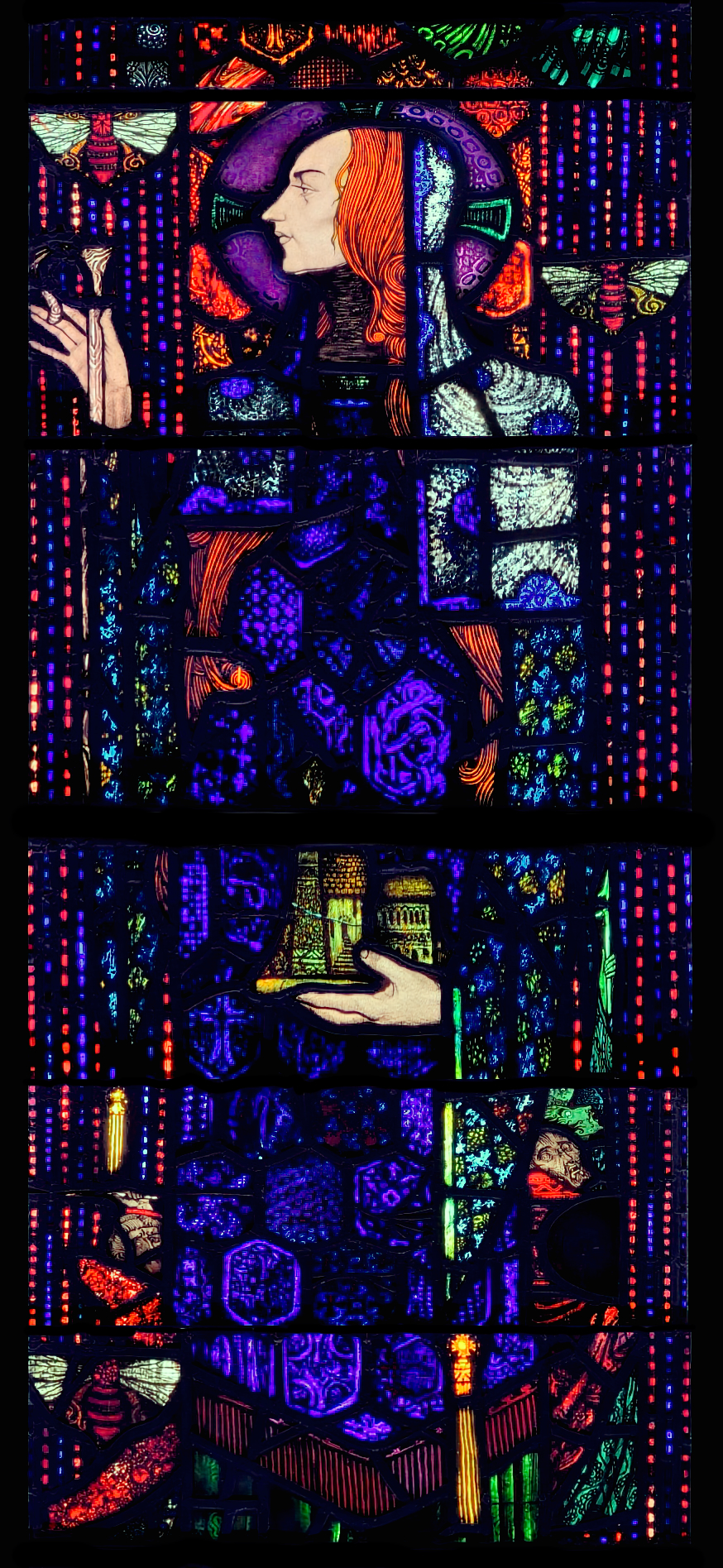
St. Gobnait Window

The Saint Gobnait window was described by the curator and writer Audrey Whitty as the "most remarkable" of the Honan windows and a high point of Clarke's career. While a number of the early Honan windows were completed by assistants working from his designs, Clarke designed the cartoon, the final window, oversaw the installation in Cork. It is located on the north side of the chapel, and depicts scenes from the life of Gobnait, a healer who established a convent in Ballyvourney and became the patron saint of bees. (Note: Gobnait was born in County Clare but lived for a time on Inisheer, where she founded a church. Clarke often visited the island during the 1900s and later honeymooned there. According to the art historian Patricia Rogers, he "certainly would have seen the famous ruins of Gobnait's first church on Inisheer, and these may have attracted him to the subject of this saint".)

In the main panel, Gobnait is shown in half-profile with a pale, thin and ascetic face and individualistic, unmistakably Irish features. She wears royal blue and purple robes adorned with lozenged jewels, a veil and a silver cloak. Her clothing draws on Léon Bakst's costume for Ida Rubinstein's 1911 performance of Le Martyre de saint Sébastien. Her right arm is outstretched in a pose influenced by Beardsley's facial and figurative types, Alesso Baldovinetti's c. 1465 Portrait of a Lady in Yellow, and portraits by Donatello. In the upper panel, the victims of a plague flee to her for sanctuary and protection. The image shows her drawing the sign of the cross on the road and marking a line around her church with her crosier. According to O'Connell, the line represents the point beyond which "the infection did not come, so that none of those who lived and served with her suffered from the plague". Clarke and his assistant Kathleen Quigly completed the window's modello under considerable time pressure over five weeks in 1914, during the offer period for the commission. A monochrome study was made in pencil, pen, inks, and watercolour on board, before the cartoon, now at the Corning Museum of Glass, was completed and eventually transferred to glass. During this process, each panel was cut up, waxed and painted. This was an expensive process for the largely unknown artist, and was funded by both his father and his friend Austin Malloy.

The Gobnait window is described by Teehan as "kaleidoscopically sumptuous" and "filled with a wealth of art historical allusions, often unexpected". According to the Irish novelist E. Œ. Somerville, it evokes late 19th-century decadence in its resemblance to a Beardsley–type female face, which "though horrible [is] so modern and conventionally unconventional ... [Clarke's] windows have a kind of hellish splendour."

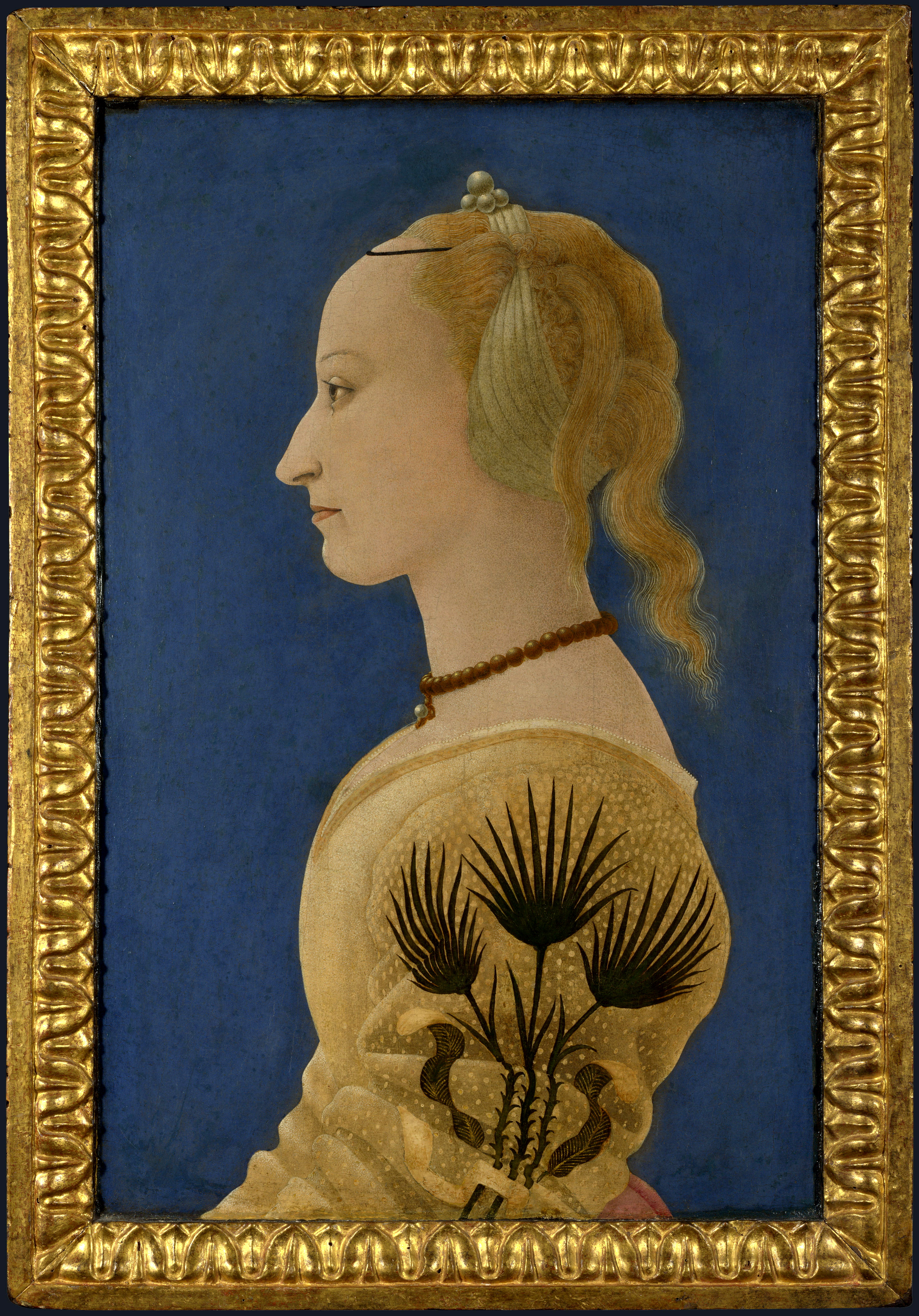
Alesso Baldovinetti, Portrait of a Lady in Yellow, c. 1465. National Gallery, London

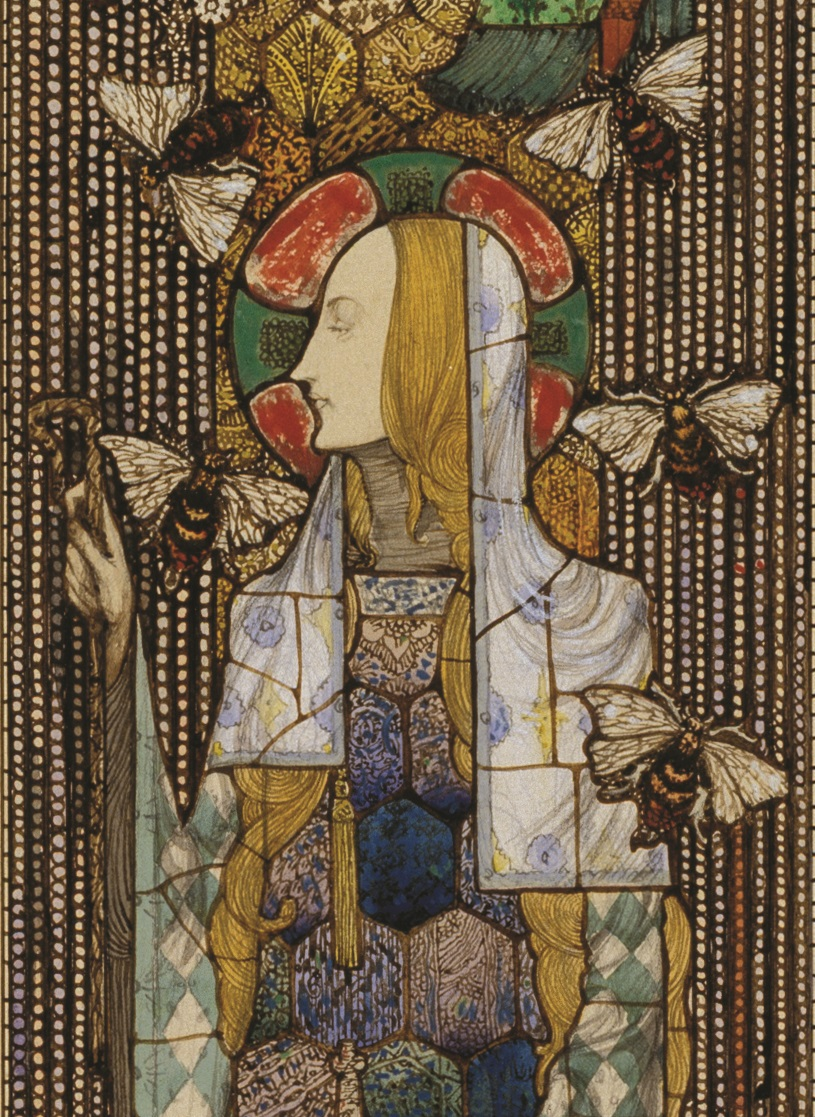
Detail from Clarke's preparatory Gobnait modello, 1914. Pencil, pen, inks and watercolor on board. Corning Museum of Glass, New York.

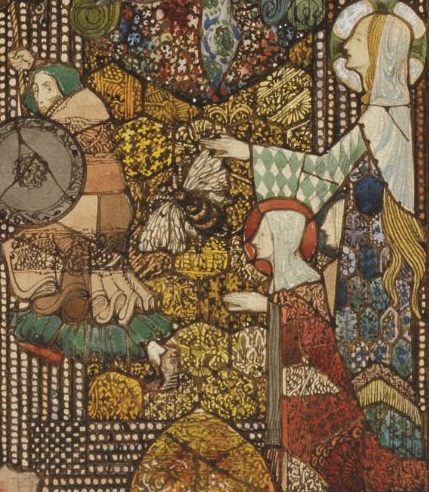
Gobnait modello, lower panel

==== Finbarr and Ita ====
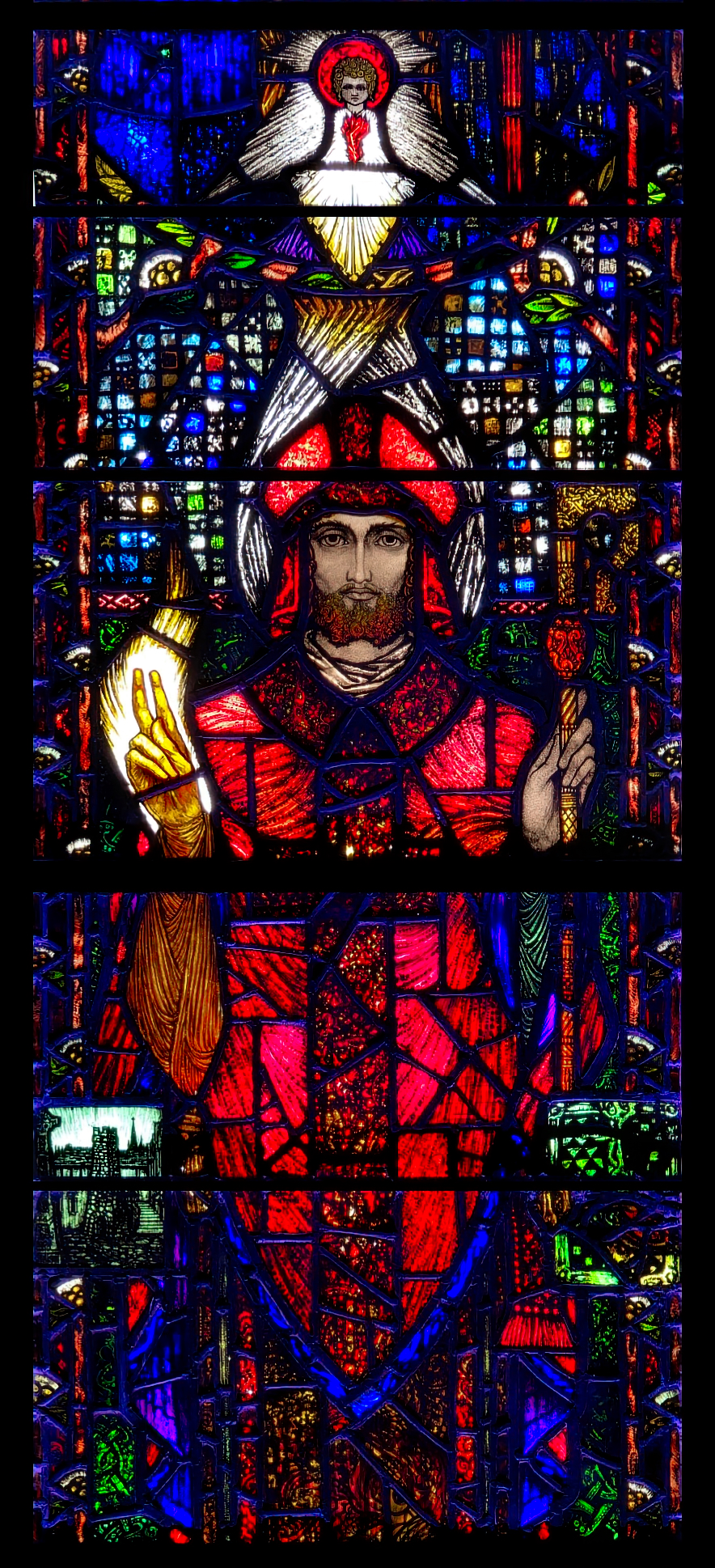
St. Finbarr window

The chapel is dedicated to Finbarr, patron saint of Cork. His window was completed in 1916 alongside Ita's, and is located on the north wall of the nave. Its colour scheme is dominated by a series of red hues. The upper panel depicts his parents who, by legend, were sentenced to death by burning after his mother refused to marry the chieftain Tyagerlach of Rathluin. The panel shows them rescued by the divine hurricane said to have put out the fire about to engulf them. Finbarr, like his mother in the upper panel, has blond hair. (Note: Finn Barr translates as "Beautiful hair".) He wears a chasuble coloured in a variety of red and rosepink colours. He holds an ornately decorated crosier in his left hand, and on his right hand is the glove he is said to have worn continuously since the day he met with Christ, who, according to O'Connell "raised the kneeling saint by his right hand, after which it ever glowed with a celestial radiance which could not be obscured, and which was only to be borne if the hand were kept covered with a glove". In the lower register, Finbarr prays alongside bishop Maccuirp, under whom he studied in Macroom.

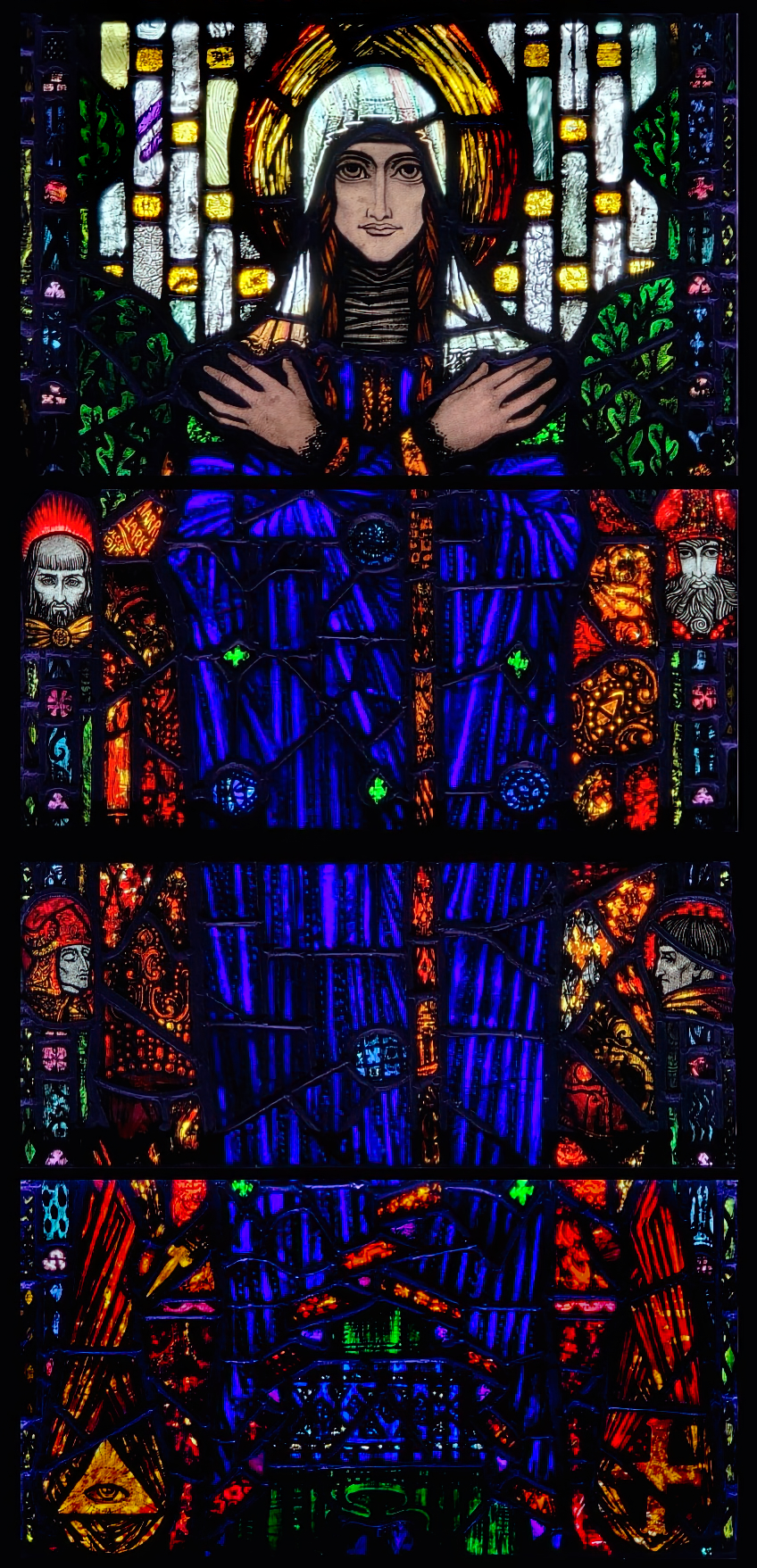
St. Ita window

The little-known ascetic Íte of Killeedy (sometimes "The Brigid of Munster") was born as either Deirdre or Dorothy in the 6th century to a local chieftain, probably in Decies-within-Drum in County Waterford, and thought to have been a descendant of Fedlimid Rechtmar and Conn of the Hundred Battles. She is in places referred to as Ita the Wise, and having changed her name to Ita due to her "extraordinary thirst for divine love", later becoming the patron saint of Killeedy in County Limerick. Her window is dominated by shades of blue, a colour usually associated with Brigid.

Íte wears royal blue clothes and her facial features are based on representations of the Eastern Roman Empress Theodora, who died in 548. The white glass surrounding her head is intended to represent a halo. The upper register shows Mary enthroned as Queen of Heaven. She is dressed in red, gold and blue robes, and shards of white glass interwoven with painted oak colours radiating from her head, representing a halo. which according to O'Connell, "symbolizes the spiritual fire which Ita spent her life in enkindling and keeping burning". Clarke wrote of the window that "in the border and wherever possible emblems are introduced symbolising Ita's great devotion to the Holy Trinity". Three jewels representing the holy trinity are sewn into her gown. The lower panel shows her, alongside her maids, in prayer to the Trinity, with, according to O'Connell, their "prayers ascending through the firmament to the Throne of God". Clarke's preparatory notes describe the lower register as depicting "St. Ita with her holy maids [who pray] with St Coleman and St. Brendan", while the borders show "the heads of four Irish saints over whom St. Ita exercised spiritual influence".

==== Albert of Cashel ====
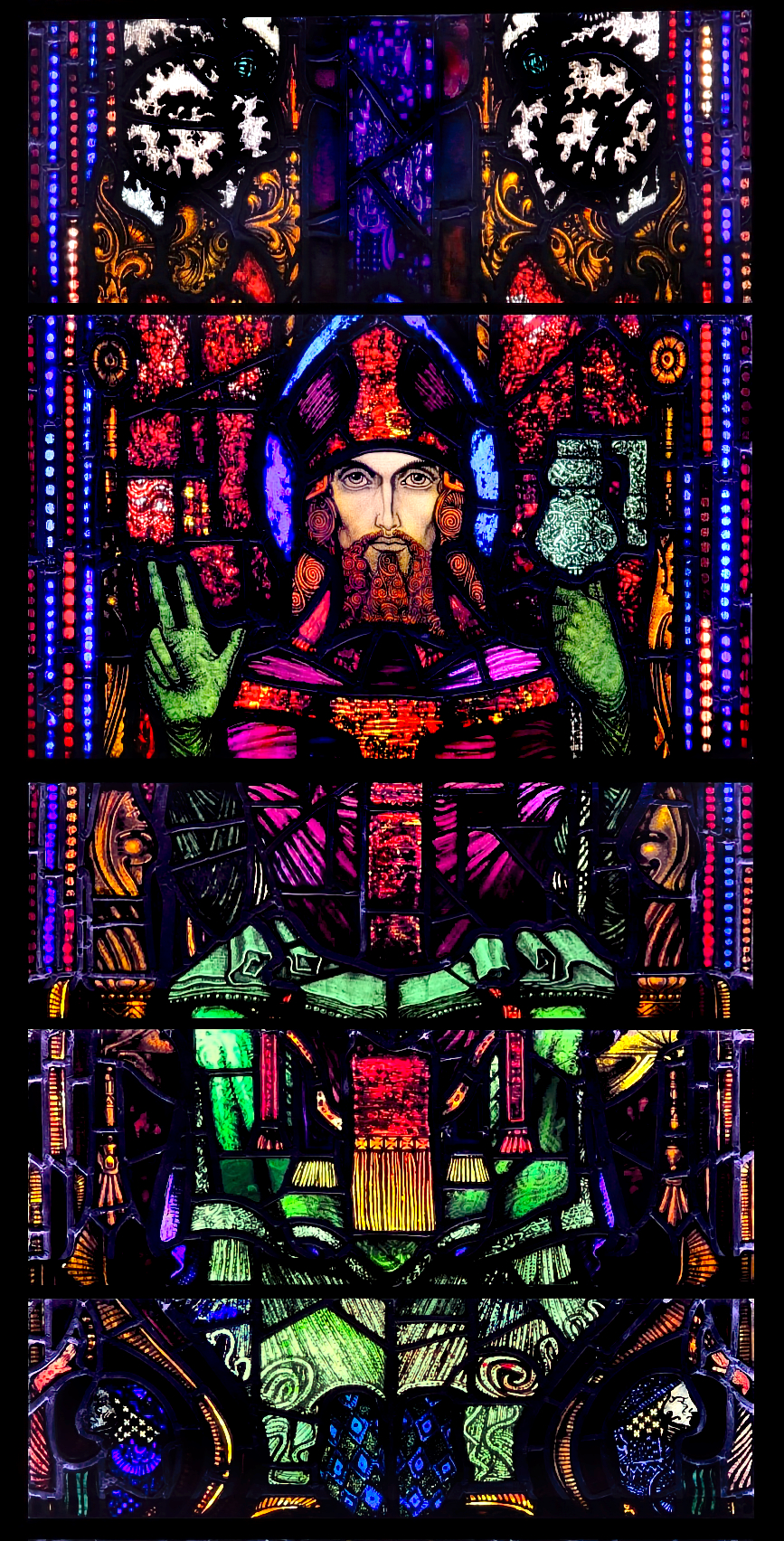
St. Albert window

The window of the little-known 8th-century missionary saint Albert of Cashel was designed immediately after the Finbarr and Ita windows. It was installed in 1916 in the chapel's north wall. Albert is shown preaching in the upper panel, with red hair and a purple chasuble, crimson stole and a mitre. He sits on an elaborately decorated green, blue and golden throne, which is positioned underneath a large cross. His shoes are decorated with blue and grey diamonds, while the keys to the Kingdom of Heaven are shown at his feet. The window is adorned with Celtic motifs, including the bronze spirals around his beard. (Note: Depictions of Albert sometimes detail the magical feats associated with him. Gibbon describes Clarke's approach as "daring" for a church design, given such deeds owe more to pagan legend rather than "respectable traits of virtue and holiness".) The lower register shows him in the act of blessing as he walks in a procession with his followers, who include St. Erhard and St. Hildulph, both of whom he is said to have met while in Regensburg in Bavaria, Germany.

==== Our Lady of Sorrows and Joseph ====
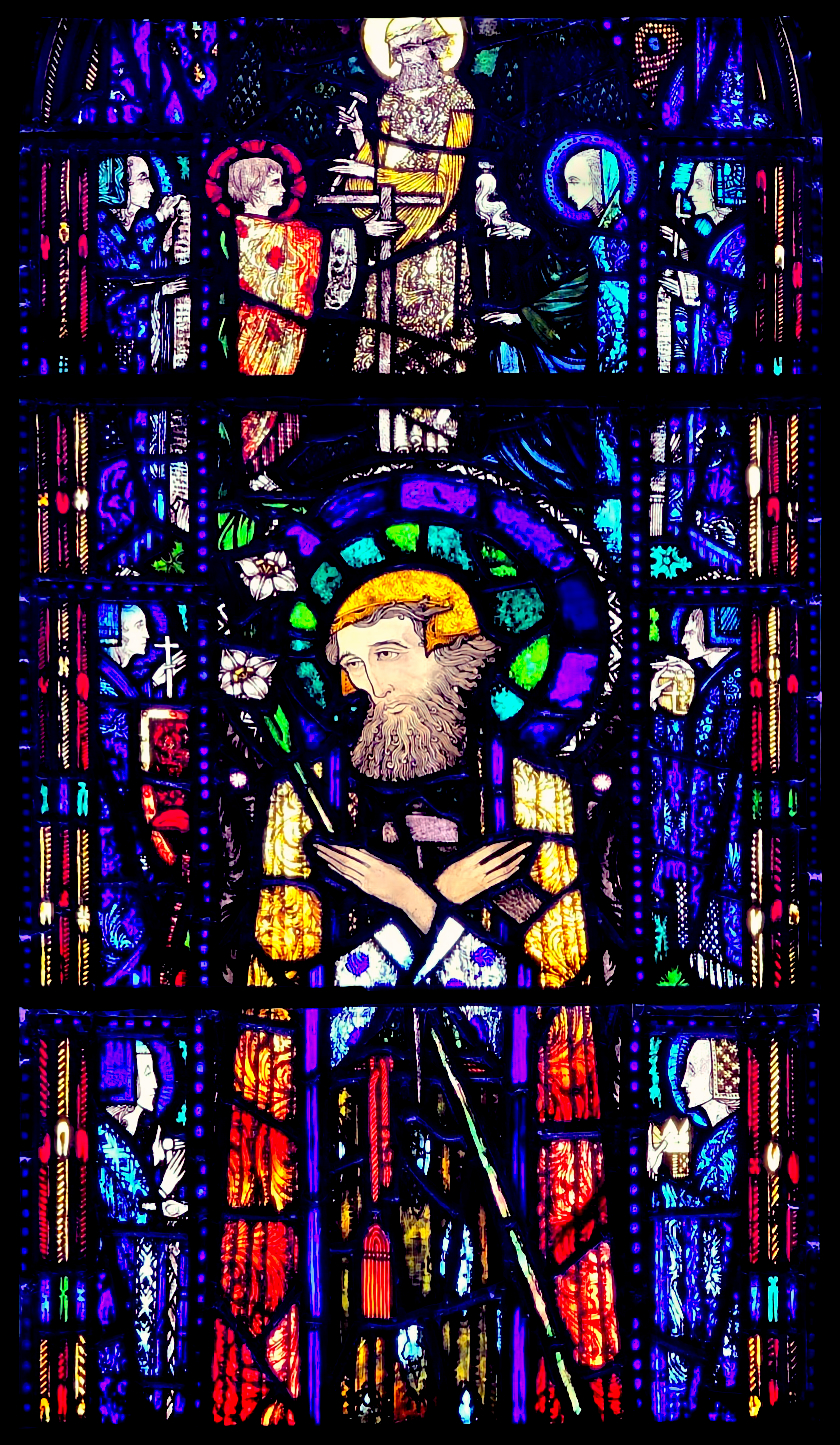
St. Joseph window

The last two of Clarke's windows depict Mary and Joseph, and were installed in Cork in April 1917, a year after the chapel's opening. Both were favourably reviewed when previewed in his Dublin studio. (Note: The Irish Builder and Engineer review carried detailed critiques of each of Clarke's Honan windows, and described them as welcomely free of the "foreign abominations" that the Celtic movement sought to "avoid".) Mary's window is located to the right of the altar. Due to its mournful tone, it is said to depict Our Lady of Sorrows. She is shown as "Mary of the Irish", with red hair and an emerald halo. She wears a deep royal blue and turquoise robe, and is shown holding a pink rose. The uppermost panel contains a star representing of the Holy Family, below which is the Holy Spirit indicated by tongues of fire. In the lower panel, St. Cronan of Roscrea holds a scroll inscribed with notation and lyrics from "Cronan na Magdine", an Irish lullaby. He is surrounded by four early Christian martyrs, each bearing emblems. Around these figures are four Japanese seals, influenced by work from Henry Payne's students at the Birmingham School of Art.

The upper panel of Joseph's window shows the saint wearing a crown of fire, and standing beside the Holy Family and four angels. In the main panel, he wears a gold and red cloak, and is given a blue and green halo. Clarke's depiction of Joseph is based on a 14th-century representation of the prophet Zephaniah now in the Victoria and Albert Museum, London. In contrast to contemporary Catholic representations of Joseph which depict him as a healthy and strong middle-aged man, Clarke shows him in the medieval tradition, as an old and frail man. The lower panel illustrates Joseph's death, with Mary, Jesus, Finbarr, Columcille and a number of other saints kneeling in prayer at his deathbed.

=== An Túr Gloine ===
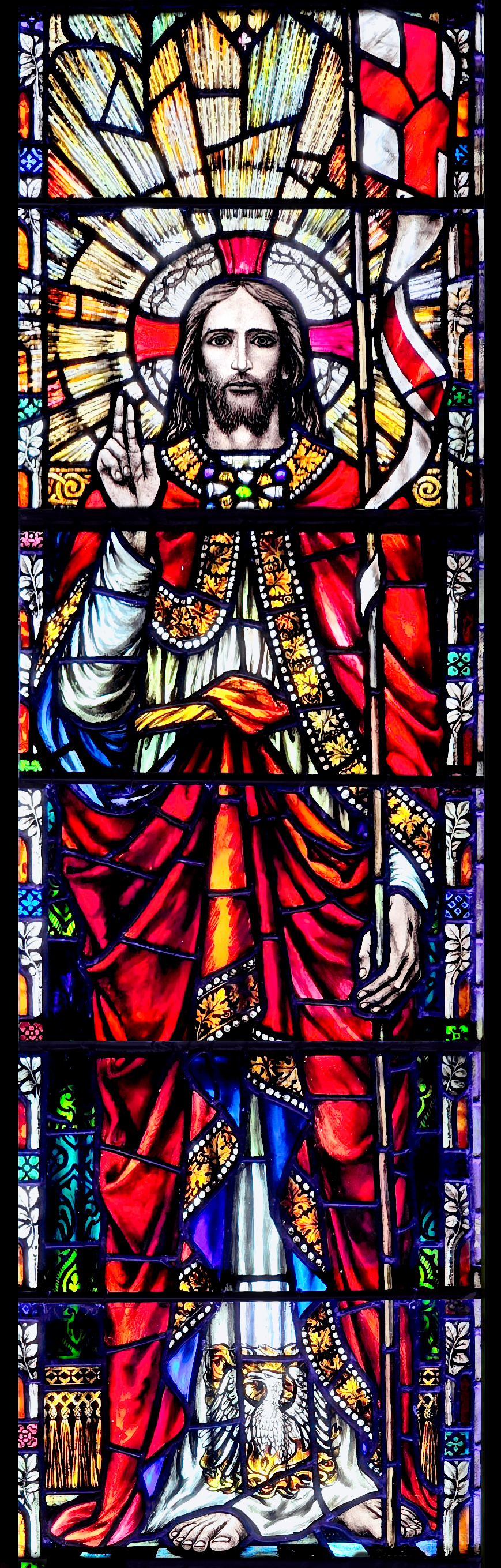
Christ in Majesty, Alfred E. Child

Sarah Purser and Edward Martyn formed An Túr Gloine ("The Glass Tower") in 1902 as a workshop to advance the artistic quality of stained glass production in Ireland. The workshop was managed by Sarah Purser's pupil A. E. Child, who was then teaching at the Metropolitan School of Art in Dublin. The studio's eight windows are attributed to Child, O'Brien and Ethel Rhind. The cartoons, like those from Clarke's studio, were designed and realised in Dublin before installation in Cork. Although their subject matter is similar to Clarke's, An Túr Gloine windows are very different in style and not of the same quality, being somewhat conventional by comparison. They are minimalist in line and colour, consisting of a dominating but simply rendered and naturalistic central figure in pale hues, surrounded by uncomplicated, largely empty opaque sub-panels. The most prominently placed window is Child's "Our Lord" on the east gable above the altar. Child depicts the risen Christ in simple forms, subdued colours and with a strong but dignified facial expression. O'Kelly's describes the portrait of Christ's eyes "as look[ing] out on humanity with a welcoming and understanding sympathy".

==== Our Lord (Child) ====
The central single-light window was designed by Alfred Child and is located directly above the altar. It is set in pale and subdued tones, and shows the risen Christ holding the banner of the Resurrection. He is marked apart from the other saints by the window's stone frames, the splendour of his crown, his crimson robe and his royal jewels. O'Connell described the window as a "touching and appealing figure marked apart in its frame of stone [which] forms the centre of such rich but restrained decoration as the chapel contains". O'Kelly wrote that his "bearded countenance is calm and dignified and the eyes look out on humanity with a welcoming and understanding sympathy".

==== St John (O'Brien) ====
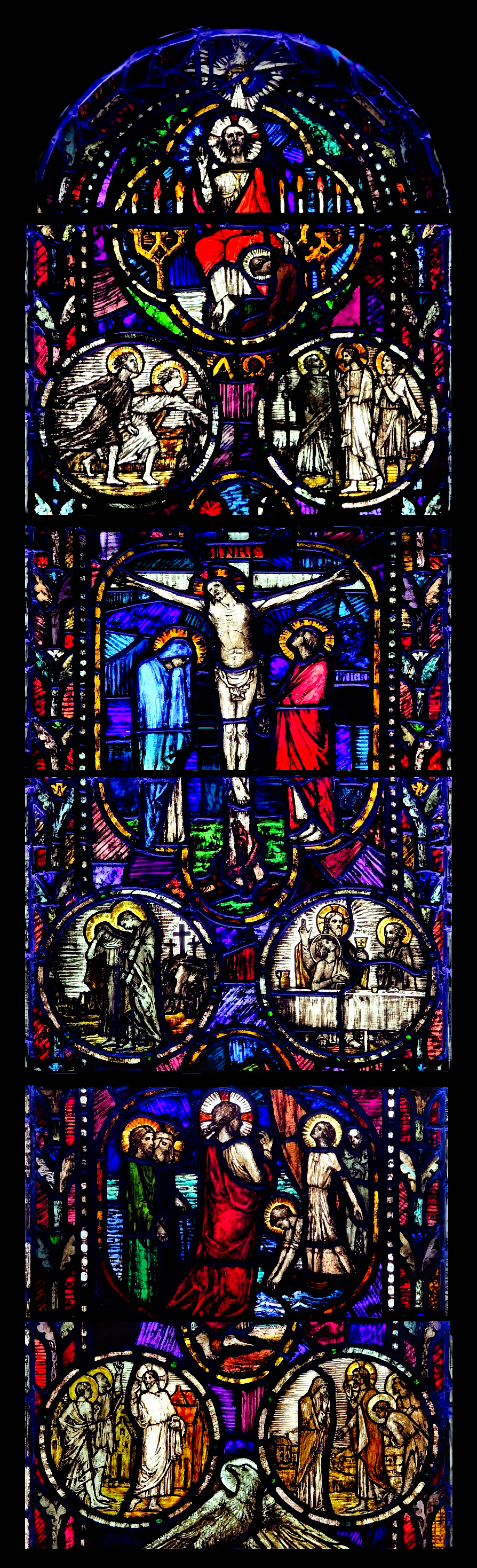
St. John by Catherine O'Brien

Catherine "Kitty" O'Brien came from an Anglo-Irish and devout Church of Ireland family, and joined An Túr Gloine in 1904 and is credited with three of the chapel's windows. The "St John" window is the only window in the chapel to portray a biblical narrative and is usually considered the strongest of An Túr Gloine's windows. It is divided into three registers, each containing pairs of medallions. Its imagery mostly comes from the life of Christ as told in the Gospel of John and draws more from close readings of scripture than traditional Catholic iconography. The upper panel is based on Revelations 1:1, and shows a vision of the glorified Christ in Majesty, with the Alpha and Omega symbols and the seven candles.

The crucifixion scene in the central panel is more richly coloured than the other panels and follows tradition in showing Mary and John at the foot of the cross. More characteristic of Protestant than Catholic iconography (Note: O'Brien joined An Túr Gloine in 1904. She came from an Anglo-Irish and devout Church of Ireland family. She is credited with three of the chapel's windows.) is the depiction of a serpent with its mouth open, coiled around the cross below Jesus' feet; the serpent probably refers to Genesis 3:15: "And I will put enmity between thee (the serpent) and the woman, and between thy seed and her seed; it shall bruise thy head, and thou shalt bruise his heel." The medallions below the crucifixion reflect two accounts of John's brother James. The lowest register is again in bright colours and shows the calling of James and John. The images stay with scriptural tradition; James and John are accompanied by their father, and are the second pair to be called, after St. Peter and St Andrew, who are already at Jesus' side. The eagle at the foot of the window is John's usual symbol.

== Furnishings, textiles and objects ==
O'Connell was keen that the chapel's artwork would draw from Ireland's ancient culture and was heavily influenced by 19th-century antiquarian research into early Christian and early medieval art, in particular early medieval metal and stone works and illuminated manuscripts. He wanted the chapel to reflect the earlier period's influence on Irish culture, while maintaining a relatively simple physical outlay, comprising what Teehan describes as a "peaceful, dignified space". The chapel's furniture includes circular iron ventilation ceiling panels and the oak chair and kneeler reserved for the president. The majority of the fittings were designed by McMullen or Sisk & Sons. The original furnishings and oak pews were designed to blend into the chapel's Celtic Revival style and (according to Teehan) create "a way that represented the spirit and skill of earlier times [that] could nonetheless be fully appreciated by contemporary society. The overall effect is one of simplicity and restfulness." Changes in liturgy following Vatican II meant that a number of furnishings had to be replaced, a project overseen by the chapel's then dean, Gearóid Ó Súilleabháin. The Honan has a large collection of metalwork and enamel pieces built by Edmond Johnson's and Egan & Sons, all in the Celtic Revival style. The most well-known piece is a large processional cross, a replica of the 12th-century ornamented processional Cross of Cong, which contains a number of inscriptions, including a remembrance for the chapel's benefactors, Mathew, Robert and Isabella Honan; and for John and Mary O'Connell.

Other items include further processional crosses, chalices, candlesticks, dishes, bells, hinges, and the iron gates at the entrance. O'Connell commissioned Egan & Sons for the altar plate and vestments. Most of the textile collection was designed by the Dun Emer Guild co-founded in Dublin by Evelyn Gleeson, with her niece Kitty MacCormack working on the textile designs for the chapel. Their additions include vestments, chasubles, burses, veils, stoles, maniples, altar cloths, wall hangings and altar fronts. The tapestry dossal on the east wall, designed and woven by Gleeson, contains Celtic symbols borrowed from the Book of Durrow. Materials vary from silk embroidery, gold braid, gold thread, linen, poplin and cotton. In general the textiles follow the usual liturgical colours for the seasons of the liturgical year. Most of the designs are centred around the Life of Mary, or the Passion, or Crucifixion, with black and white being the predominant colours.

The pipe organ is on the west wall in a timber frame. It was built by Wicklow native Kenneth Jones and installed in 1996.

Michael Barry Egan's firm designed and sewed many of the vestments. A highlight is the Y-shaped, silver threaded chasuble in black poplin cloth, made for use at funerals. Covering the altar is a violet altar cloth with an altar frontal that is decorated with Celtic interlacing, realised in shades of purple silk with orange and yellow highlights, and a border of lemon and violet cotton satin. The "Black set" of Honan textiles includes an altar frontal with a Celtic cross based on a gravestone from Tullylease Church in Cork, and a black hooded cope with a crown of thorns design, and a black chasuble designed for funeral masses containing Celtic interlace patterns.

== Administration and liturgical services ==
The chapel's day-to-day operations are run in conjunction with UCC's chaplaincy department, while management and funding is provided by the Honan Trust, established in 1915. The Honan is a separate legal entity from the university and holds the title for its demise, bounded by its back wall and chapel gates. Its dean is secretary to the Board of Governors of the trust, manages the staff and finances, and is responsible for the chapel's conservation and maintenance. The chapel holds daily and Sunday masses as well as memorial services for deceased students and staff. Morning prayers are held each Monday and daily during Advent and Lent. It hosts an average of 150 wedding services per year for graduates, which are a funding source for the chapel. It also holds a number of musical and other cultural events.
