= Teehan =

Teehan is a surname. Notable people with the surname include:

- Barry Teehan, Offaly hurler
- Charles Teehan, Irish rugby union player
- Ciarán Teehan, Irish darts player
- John Teehan, Irish hurler
- Patrick Teehan (1904–1985), Irish politician
- Tom Teehan (1904–1992), Irish hurler
- Virginia Teehan, Irish art historian, writer, curator and archivist
