= Charles Teehan =

Irish rugby union player

- Born: 6 May 1919 Buttevant, County Cork, Ireland
- Died: 15 December 1984 (aged 65)

Rugby union career
- Position: Front row
International career
Years	Team	Apps	(Points)
1939	Ireland	3	(0)

Charles Teehan (6 May 1919 — 15 December 1984) was an Irish international rugby union player.

Born in Buttevant, County Cork, Teehan played for University College Cork and was capped three times as a teenage front row forward for Ireland in the 1939 Home Nations, preferred over former captain Sam Walker. He became the first player produced by Highfield RFC to gain an Ireland cap.

Teehan enlisted in the Royal Air Force in World War II.

== See also ==
- List of Ireland national rugby union players
