= Alesso Baldovinetti =

Italian painter (1427-1499)

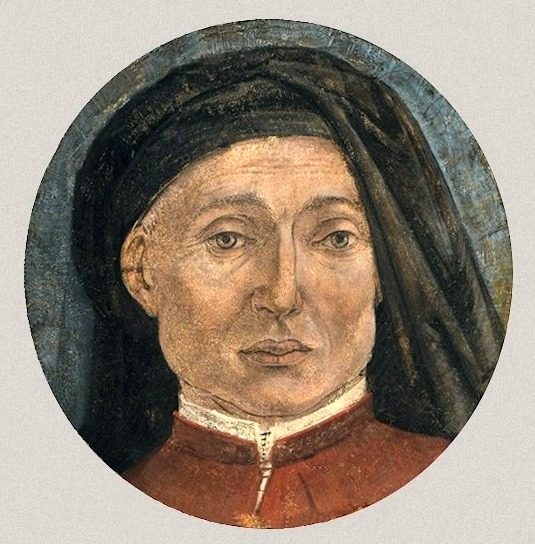
Alesso Baldovinetti's self-portrait. Fragment of destroyed frescos in Gianfiliazzi chapel (Bergamo, Accademia Carrara)

Alesso or Alessio Baldovinetti (14 October 1427 – 29 August 1499) was an Italian early Renaissance painter and draftsman.

== Biography ==
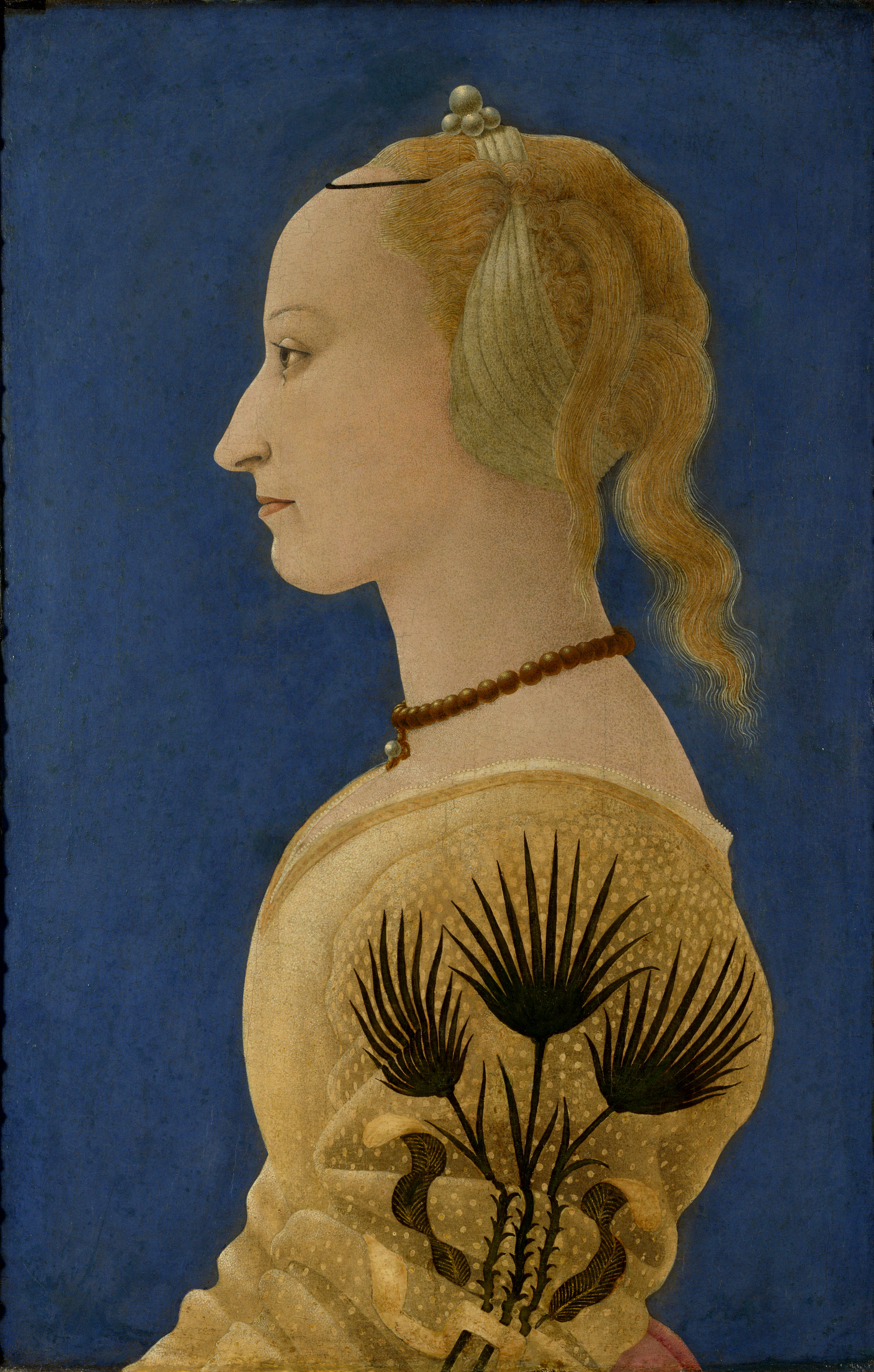
Portrait of a Lady in Yellow, 1400s, c. 1465, The National Gallery, London.

Baldovinetti was born in Florence to a rich noble family of merchants. In 1448 he was registered as a member of the Guild of St. Luke: "Alesso di Baldovinetti, dipintore."

He was a follower of the group of scientific realists and naturalists in art which included Andrea del Castagno, Paolo Uccello and Domenico Veneziano. Tradition says that he assisted in the decorations of the church of S. Egidio, however no records confirm this. These decoration were carried out during the years 1441–1451 by Domenico Veneziano and in conjunction with Andrea del Castagno. That he was commissioned to complete the series at a later date (1458–62) is certain.

In 1460 Alesso was employed to paint the great fresco of the Annunciation in the cloister of the Annunziata basilica. The remains as we see them give evidence of the artist's power both of imitating natural detail with minute fidelity and of spacing his figures in a landscape with a large sense of air and distance; and they amply verify two separate statements of Vasari concerning him: that "he delighted in drawing landscapes from nature exactly as they are, whence we see in his paintings rivers; bridges, rocks, plants, fruits, roads, fields, cities, exercise grounds, and an infinity of other such things," and that he was an inveterate experimentalist in technical matters.

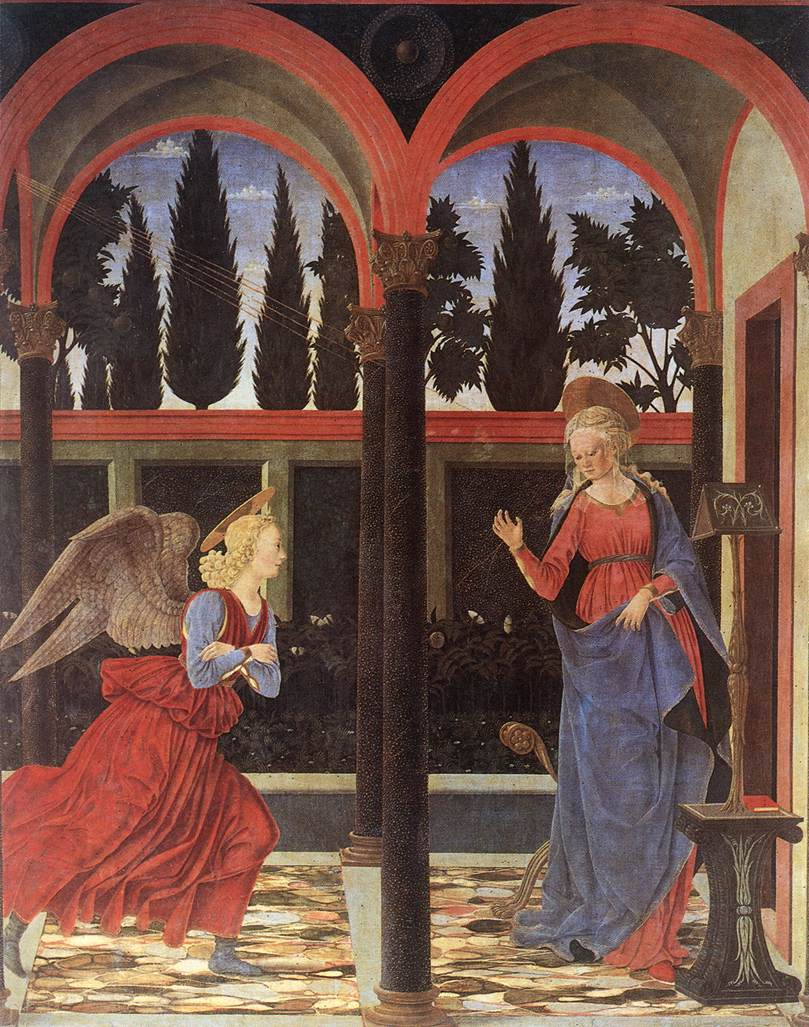
Annunciation (1457) Tempera on wood, 167 x 137 cm Galleria degli Uffizi, Florence.

His favourite method in wall-painting was to lay in his compositions in fresco and finish them a secco with a mixture of yolk of egg and liquid varnish. This, says Vasari, was with the view of protecting the painting from damp; but in course of time the parts executed with this vehicle scaled away, so that the great secret he hoped to have discovered turned out a failure. In 1463 he furnished a cartoon of the Nativity, which was executed in tarsia by Giuliano de Maiano in the sacristy of the cathedral and still exists. In c. 1465 he painted Portrait of a Lady in Yellow. From 1466 date the groups of four Evangelists and four Fathers of the Church in fresco, together with the Annunciation on an oblong panel, which still decorate the Portuguese chapel in the basilica of San Miniato, and are given in error by Vasari to Piero del Pollaiuolo.

Beginning in 1466 Alesso undertook important works for the church of Santa Trinita on the commission of Bongianni Gianfigliazzi: first, to paint an altar-piece of the Holy Trinity with saints, a work that he finished in 1472; next, a series of frescoes from the Old Testament which was to be completed according to contract within five years, but actually remained on hand for fully twenty-six. In 1497 the finished series, which contained many portraits of leading Florentine citizens, was valued at a thousand gold florins by a committee consisting of Cosimo Rosselli, Benozzo Gozzoli, Perugino and Filippino Lippi; only some defaced fragments of it now remain. Meanwhile, Alesso had been much occupied with other technical pursuits and researches apart from wall and panel painting. As a draftsman and painter, he made a significant contribution to the Tuscan production of stained glass windows. Examples after his designs include Saint Andrew and God the Father in the Pazzi Chapel and Saints Luke and John in the apse of Lucca Cathedral. Others have been executed for the Pisan Camposanto Monumentale, for the upper church of the Basilica of Saint Francis of Assisi, Prato Cathedral and the nave of Santa Croce, Florence. He was regarded by his contemporaries as the one craftsman who had rediscovered and fully understood the long disused art of mosaic, and was employed accordingly between 1481 and 1483 to repair the mosaics over the door of the church of S. Miniato, as well as several of those both within and without the baptistery of the cathedral. He died in the hospital San Paolo, August 29, 1499, and was buried in San Lorenzo.

One of his pupils was Domenico Ghirlandaio.
