= Kathleen Quigly =

Irish stained glass artist, illustrator and painter

- Born: 6 March 1888; Dublin, Ireland
- Died: 15 August 1981 (aged 93); Marandellas, Rhodesia
- Education: Metropolitan School of Art
- Movement: stained glass movement

Kathleen Quigly (6 March 1888 – 15 August 1981) was an Irish stained glass artist, illustrator and painter. She was also a metal worker and jewellery designer.

== Life ==
Kathleen Quigly was born in Dublin on 6 March 1888. Her father was Richard Quigly, a civil engineer. In her early childhood she travelled abroad with her family. She then attended the Central School of Arts and Crafts in London and then entered the Dublin Metropolitan School of Art around 1906. There she studied under the school's first stained glass master, Alfred E. Child, discovering a talent for illuminating glass. She went on to occasionally work with An Túr Gloine under Sarah Purser. She showed a copper cup and stand at the 1910 exhibition of the Arts and Crafts Society of Ireland while she was still a student. In 1911 she contributed pages to the illuminated album with panels and borders of Celtic ornament, Address of welcome to Queen Mary from the women of Ireland. She exhibited with the Royal Hibernian Academy (RHA) in 1917 with two works, and was living at 5 Clareville Road, Dublin. The same year she showed a wood-block print, Girl with two lamps, with the Arts and Crafts Society. By 1917, Quigly was a member of the Guild of Irish Artworkers, representing the Guild on the council of the Arts and Crafts Society of Ireland in 1917.

Quigly began working for Harry Clarke in January 1919, at his studios in North Frederick Street, becoming a full employee in October 1921. Said by some to have been his most valuable assistant, she worked with Clarke until 1924, working on St Stephen's window in a church in Gorey, County Wexford and the Angel of peace and hope window in Holy Trinity church, Killiney, County Dublin. She created three windows for the dolls house, Titania's Palace. Her most notable work she created with Clarke is the Eve of St Agnes, when it was shown at the Aonach Tailteann art exhibition in August 1924 it won a trophy gold medal. The window is now display at the Hugh Lane Gallery.

At the 1925 Arts and Crafts exhibition, Quigly exhibited the Annunciation window, while also helping to organise the exhibition. In the same year she showed three works with the RHA and was living at 14 Westmoreland Street. Between 1930 and 1934, she exhibited a further 7 works with the RHA. She continued to create commissions, including windows for the treasure house of Eu Tong Sen, a wealthy Singapore merchant, in 1927 she completed a window for the chapel at the Sacred Heart Convent, Newton, near Boston, Massachusetts, and in 1929 she created three of the decorative borders of the official handbook for Dublin civic week.

In 1932 she showed on portrait and four stained-glass panels at the Oireachtas art exhibition. After this Quigly emigrated to South Africa, where she lived for the rest of her life. At first she painted, exhibiting with Transvaal art society and the South African Academy in Johannesburg in 1935, 1936, and 1939. She began working with A. L. Watson in a stained glass studio after she settled in Johannesburg. From there she made over a hundred windows, and during the 1950s she is thought to be the only female stained glass artist in South Africa. She retired to Rhodesia, and died in Marandellas on 15 August 1981.

She is often listed as Kathleen Quigley, but she always signed her name as Quigly. Some of her etching were included in The Ava Gallery 2014 exhibition, Irish Women Artists 1870–1970.
