= Portrait of a Lady in Yellow =

15th Century Florentine painting

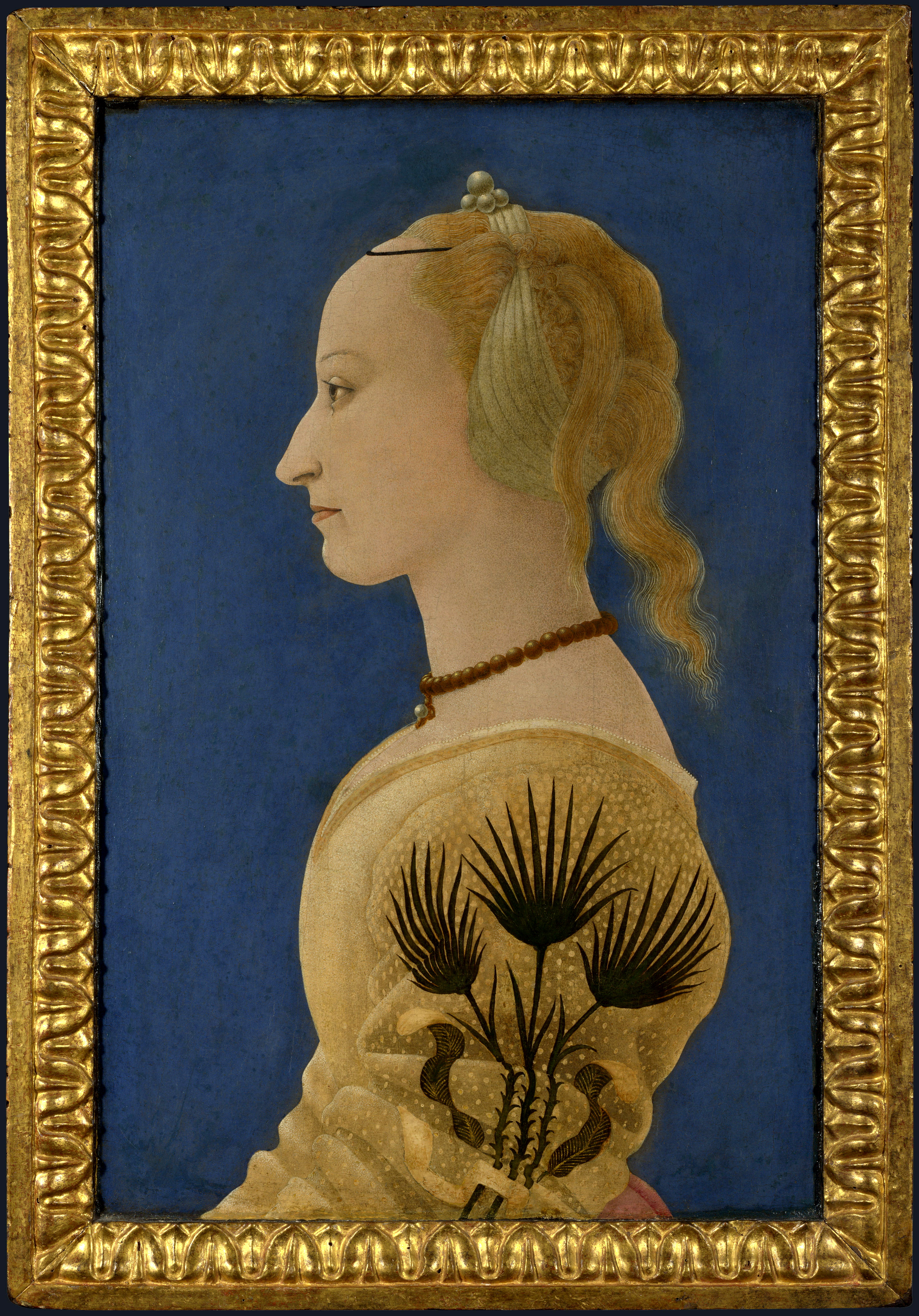
Alesso Baldovinetti, Portrait of a Lady in Yellow, c. 1465, Tempera on Panel, 62.9cm x 40.6cm. The National Gallery, London

Portrait of a Lady in Yellow was painted by the Florentine artist Alesso Baldovinetti sometime in the second half of the 15th century, most likely c. 1465. For centuries the work was misattributed; it was purchased by the National Gallery London in 1866 as a portrait of Countess Palma of Urbino, attributed to Piero della Francesca. In 1911, the art historian Roger Fry established that it was by Baldovinetti. However, there is no evidence of the source of the commission, and doubt remains as to the identity of the sitter; the most plausible theory is that she is Francesca degli Stati of Urbino.

The sitter is shown in profile, reflecting the early Renaissance interest in the Antique, and lending the work an almost sculpted feel. She is set against a uniform blue background, in a canvas that is largely flat and lacking in either perspective or depth. Instead the focus of the work centers on the fineries of both her headdress and adorned sleeve.

== Attribution ==
Until 1911 the painting was attributed to Piero della Francesca; largely due to its similarity to his portrait of the Duchess of Urbino. In 1911 Roger Fry established that the work was by Baldovinetti. Fry based his claim on several grounds, including technique, colour scheme and the form of the woman's face and drapery, all of which he believed could only be credited to Baldovinetti.

Drawing from his own observations and details from Giorgio Vasari's The Lives of the Artists he noted elements of Baldovinetti's style not common among contemporary Italian painters, including the manner in which he used tempera rather than hatching to fuse colour. He further notes the use of dry colouration and straw yellow present in the work and typical of Baldovinetti, while Francesca tended towards more earthy skin tones with a bright luminous finish. Today Fry's attribution to Baldovinetti is accepted without real doubt.

== Description ==
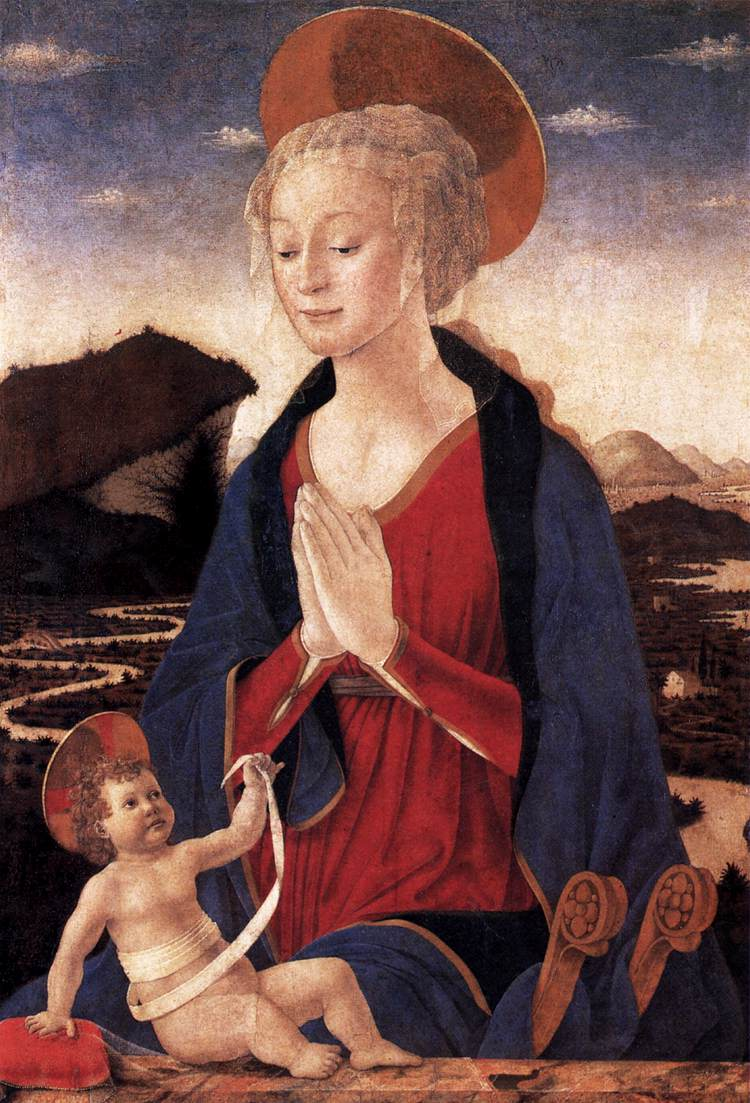
Alesso Baldovinetti, Madonna and Child, c. 1460–1465, Louvre, Paris. Roger Fry noted the closeness in proportion and the similarity in form of the women's facial features when he claimed Baldovinetti as the artist behind Portrait of a Lady in Yellow.

The woman is shown in profile, reflecting the contemporary interest in classical art. The similarity is closely aligned with antique gems and coins, and the contemporary medals that imitated them. The profile view allowed an easy way to render the particulars of a face, although it often highlighted unflattering features; her receding chins and brows, and the uneven line of her nose. However it did allow Baldovinetti to flatter the cut of her dress, the line of her hair and highlight the (probably imagined) length of her neck. A thin white line runs around the edge of the profile to accentuate it. Her adorned sleeve attracts the viewer's attention and contains the most intricate levels of detail. These were the height of fashion at the time, often detachable from the gown (camora), and of a higher value, often by multiples than the main costume. She wears a thin black lenza on her forehead, which seems to be made from fine black silk, while her frenello headdress is almost as fine and detailed as her sleeve. The picture is still in its original frame.

The sitter has elegance and some delicate, fine, facial features-notable her shaven or plucked eyebrow and cheekbones, but she is not beautiful. Writer Jill Condra described her as "harsh" looking with a "serious" forehead. The woman has a distinctive nose, and seems to be flat chested, while her lower lip protrudes over the upper. However, she has an elongated, dignified neck and attractive orange hair which lively spills to her shoulders, though the hair falling on her back may be false, a fashionable adornment. She wears pearls on her head and around her neck which represents her wealth, while her hair is plucked back as was the fashion of the day.

In common with other Italian female portraits of the time, the work is largely flat and rendered with little indication of volume. It was typical for the era to be more concerned with outline than volume, and in common with many other mid-15th century female portraits, it sets a pale but rose-lipped female against a flat blue background. The colourisation is opaque; she has excessively pale skin. which, apart from the blush on her cheekbone, is lighter but similar in hue to both her dress and hair. In addition, the image is largely static; the woman is fixed against a rigid and uniform blue background, and the only indication of movement is her falling locks of hair. Her expression is enigmatic and inscrutable, the portrait is an idealisation, showing the sitter as chaste and incorruptible. Art historian Dennis Geronimus described the immobility of this work and similar portraits as depictions of "pale bright-lipped...pinned butterflies." In 2008, the Evening Standard described the portrait as "so clear and sharp that she is as unreal as she is real...[a] painted ideal of fashionable blonde hair, pale skin, and unnaturally lofty brow.

== Identity of the sitter ==
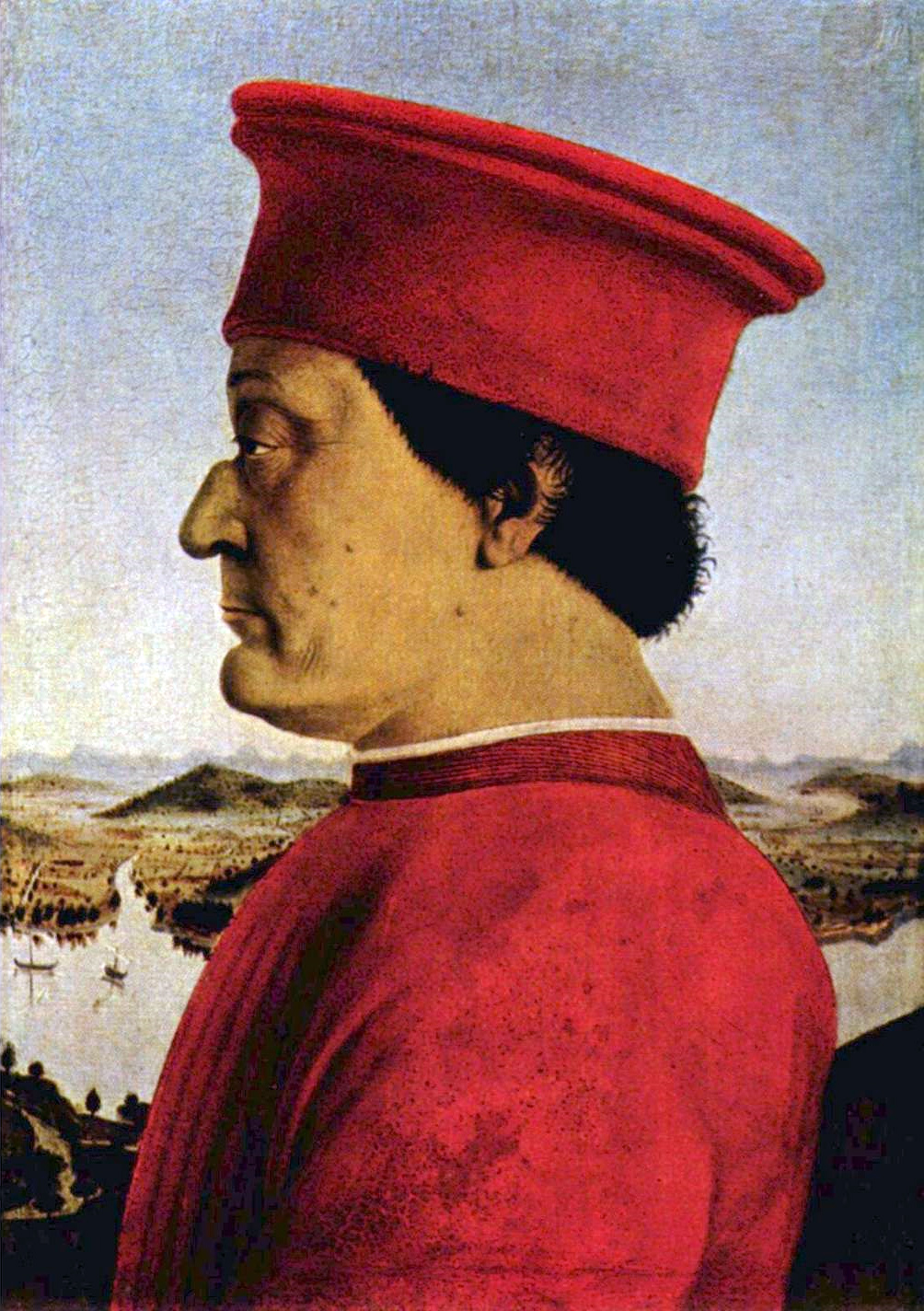
Portrait Federico da Montefeltro, Piero della Francesca, c. 1465–1470. In this portrait, the Duke is shown in profile not because of the influence of classical art but because his right eye had been injured in battle.

The identity of the sitter remains uncertain and art historians have looked for clues in the pattern in her sleeve. Undoubtedly a heraldic design, its three palm leaves, with two dark feathers bound by ribbon, would have represented the coat of arms of her family or her suitor's. Given the finery of her costume and jewels, she was almost certainly a noblewoman.

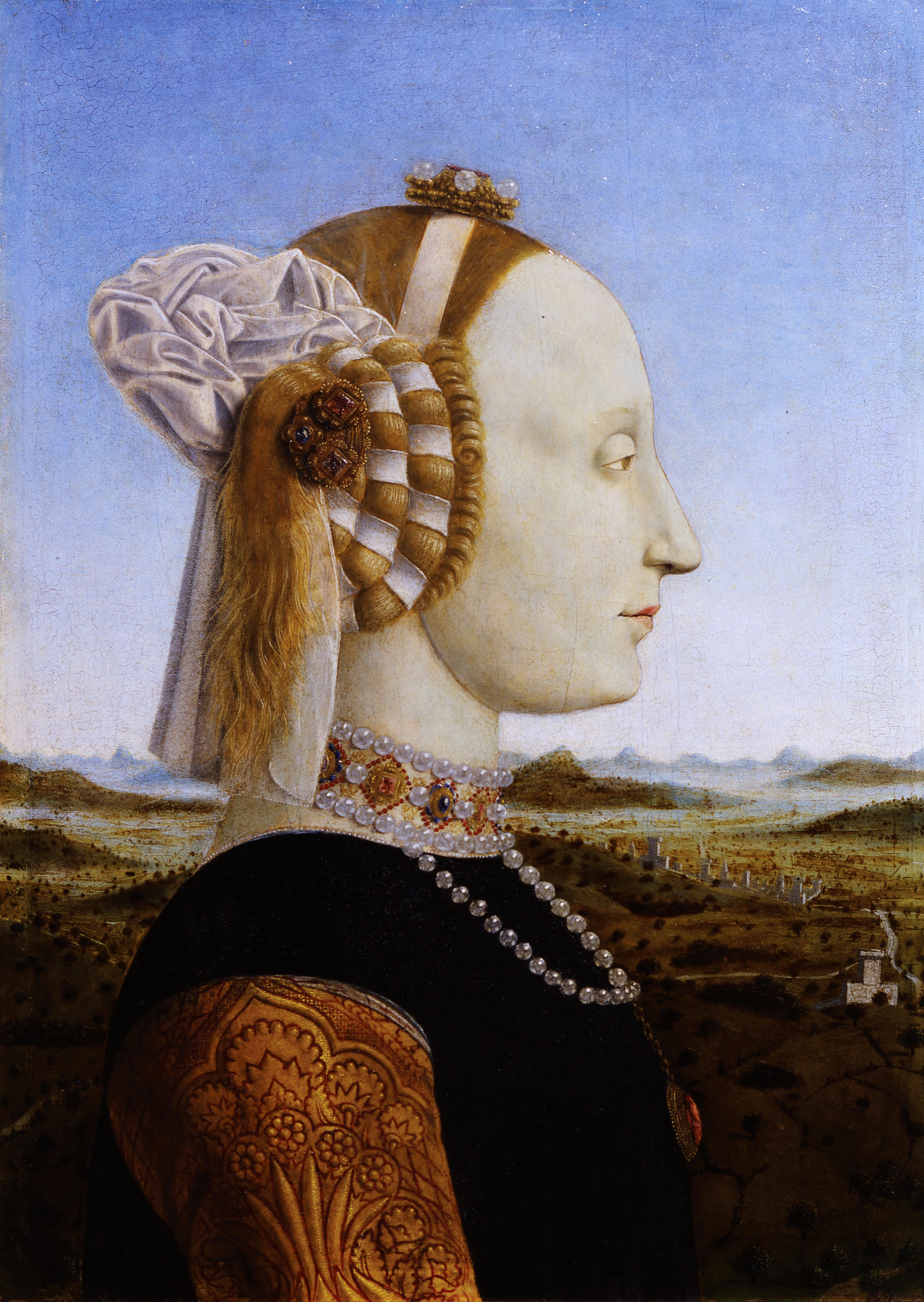
Dutchess of Urbino, Piero della Francesca, c. 1465–1470. Note the resemblance of her nose to that of the sitter's in Baldovinetti's portrait.

It was first suggested in 1924, largely based on the coat of arms, that she may be Francesca degli Stati, wife of Angelo Galli (d. 1459) a minor poet and diplomat from Urbino. Francesca was celebrated in 1445 for uncovering a plot against Federico da Montefeltro, Duke of Urbino, whose wife is portrayed in the Piero della Francesca that lead to the mis-attribution. The emblem of the Galli family is identified in a June 1443 letter as consisting of tre penne (three pens), which may be a reference to the feathers as writing instruments, though Baldovinetti's portrait shows two, not three.

There is a further link in the palm leaves, which were a decorative motif for the homes of members of the family, and their main palazzo in the Borgo di Valbona, Urbino was often known as the palazzo della palme. In 1599, the family changed their name to Palma.

== Sources ==
- Broude, Norma; Garrard, Mary D. (eds.). The Expanding Discourse: Feminism and Art History. Boulder, CO: Westview Press, 1992
- Condra, Jill. The Greenwood Encyclopedia of Clothing through World History: Volume 2, 1501–1800. Greenwood, 2007. ISBN 0-313-33664-4
- Geronimus, Dennis. Piero Di Cosimo: Visions Beautiful and Strange. New Haven: Yale University Press, 2006. ISBN 0-300-10911-3
- Langmuir, Erica. The National Gallery companion guide, 1997 revised edition. London: National Gallery. ISBN 1-85709-218-X
- Potterton, Homan. The National Gallery. London: Thames and Hudson, 1977
- Tinagli, Paola. Women in Italian Renaissance Art. Manchester: Manchester University Press, 1997
