= Virginia Teehan =

Irish art historian, writer, curator and archivist

Virginia Teehan is an Irish art historian, writer, curator and archivist who has led the Irish Heritage Council (An Comhairle Oidhreachta) since January 2019. She was elected a member of the Royal Irish Academy in 2022.

She grew up in Kilkenny, and studied at University College Cork (UCC) where she attained an bachelor's degree in arts, and later at Trinity College Dublin where she earned a Master of Philosophy. She is a qualified archivist and former Chair of the Archives and Records Association Ireland. In that capacity she is credited as having successfully lobbied for the introduction of legislation to protect local authority archives. In 2018 Teehan completed an MBA (University College Cork). She has acted as director of Cultural Projects at UCC, and as director of the Hunt Museum in Limerick.

During her time at the Hunt Museum Teehan successfully led the organization through a government enquiry established following an allegation made by the Simon Wiesenthal Centre Paris that items from the Hunt collection were looted during the Nazi era. Teehan established a major provenance research project which proved ultimately that the allegations were unfounded. She was appointed by minister Síle de Valera to the board of the Heritage Council from 2000–05 and was reaffirmed until 2008. She was appointed to the Board of the National Museum of Ireland in 2016.

Teehan has written extensively on the history and artworks of the Honan Chapel in UCC, as well as on fine and decorative arts, and cultural management, including monographs on Ogham inscriptions, Seán Keating, Louis le Brocquy and Jack B. Yeats.

== Selected publications ==
=== Books ===
- Sean Keating: In Focus. Associated Editions, 2009. ISBN 978-1-9064-2904-1
- Louis Le Brocquy Allegory and Legend. Hunt Museum, 2006. ISBN 978-0-9520-9225-4
- The Honan Chapel: A Golden Vision (with Elizabeth Heckett). Cork University Press, 2005. ISBN 978-1-8591-8346-5
- The Ogam Stones at University College Cork (with Damian McManus). Cork University Press, 2005. ASIN: B00FBBG3L8
- Jack B. Yeats: Master of Ceremonies. Hunt Museum, 2004. ISBN 978-0-952-09222-3
- Provision of Genealogical Services in Ireland. The Heritage Council, 2000. ISBN 978-1901-1372-17

=== Journals ===
- "Celtic renaissance". Irish Arts Review, volume 33, issue 1, 2016. JSTOR 24891719
- "Raqqan bowl". Irish Arts Review, volume 26, issue 2, 2009. JSTOR 25654702
