= Beadon =

Beadon may refer to:

- Sir Cecil Beadon (1816–1880), administrator in British India, Lieutenant-Governor of Bengal
- Clive Beadon (1919–1996), British dowser, diplomat, and officer in the Royal Air Force
- Edward Beadon Turner (1854–1931), English medical doctor and medical administrator
- Frederick Beadon (1777–1879), English clergyman, canon of Wells Cathedral
- Jane Beadon (1913–1999), Scottish socialite, heiress, and actress
- Dr Richard Beadon (1737–1824), Master of Jesus College, Cambridge; Bishop of Gloucester and of Bath & Wells
