= Arthur Palmer =

Arthur Palmer may refer to:

- Arthur Palmer (politician) (1912–1994), British politician
- Arthur Palmer (priest) (1807–1881), Anglican priest
- Arthur Palmer (scholar) (1841–1897), Canadian-Irish classical scholar
- Arthur Hunter Palmer (1819–1898), Australian politician and Premier of Queensland
- Arthur Power Palmer (1840–1904), British Commander-in-Chief, India
