= Gaisford Prize =

Oxford awards for Greek or Latin

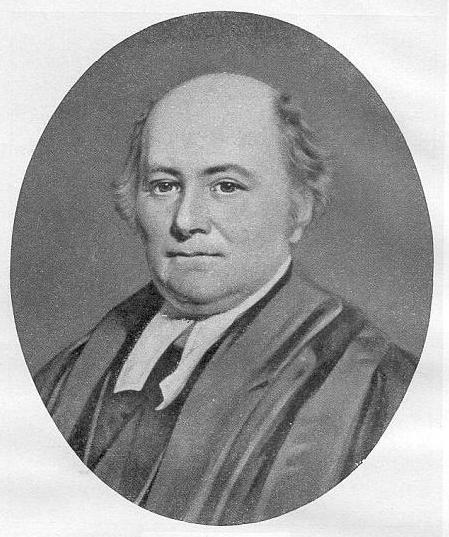
Thomas Gaisford

The Gaisford Prize is a prize awarded by the Faculty of Classics, University of Oxford for a composition in Classical Greek Verse and Prose by an undergraduate student. The prize was founded in 1855 in memory of Dr Thomas Gaisford (1779–1855). The prizes now also include the Gaisford Essay Prize and the Gaisford Dissertation Prize.

== History ==
Dr Thomas Gaisford, Dean of Christ Church, Regius Professor of Greek in the University of Oxford for more than forty years (1811–1855), died on 2 June 1855. Ten days later, at a meeting held in Christ Church on 12 June, it was resolved to establish a prize in his honour, to be called the Gaisford Prize, and to raise for that purpose £1,000 by public subscription, the interest to be applied "to reward a successful prizeman or prizemen, under such regulations as shall be approved by Convocation". The prizes were first awarded in 1857.

There have been four categories of Gaisford Prize. The two original categories were:

- Gaisford Prize for Greek Verse. It ceased being awarded for a period after 1975, but had been revived by 1995.
- Gaisford Prize for Greek Prose. By the late 1980s it was awarded based on Honour Moderations exams.

By 2003 the Schedule to the University's Statutes and Regulations provided for a different two prizes, which remained in the Schedule as of 2024:

- Gaisford Essay Prize for Greek Language and Literature, available to undergraduates
- Gaisford Dissertation Prize for Greek or Latin Language and Literature, available to graduates

The 1857–1876 winners of the Greek Prose Prize were listed alongside winners of the Newdigate Prize on the wrapper of Oscar Wilde's published Newdigate-winning poem Ravenna (1878).

== Winners of the Gaisford Prize for Greek Verse ==
- 1857: Joseph Henry Warner (Balliol) for Homeric verse: Milton's Paradise Lost 6.56-98.
- 1858: Reginald Broughton (Balliol) for comic iambics: Shakespeare's Henry IV, Part I, Act 2 Sc. 4.
- 1859: George Rankine Luke (Balliol) for hexameter verse: Morte D'Arthur.
- 1860: Chaloner William Chute (Balliol) for tragic iambic verse: Shakespeare's Richard III, Act 4, Sc. 4.
- 1861: James Bryce (Trinity) for Theocritean verse: The May Queen: a Greek idyll (from Tennyson).
- 1862: Robert William Raper (Trinity) for comic iambic verse: Shakespeare's Henry IV, Part II, Act 4, Sc. 3.
- 1863: Charles John Pearson for Homeric verse: Paradise Lost 6.824-877.
- 1864: Evelyn Abbott (Balliol) for tragic iambic verse: Shakespeare's Pericles, Act 5, Sc. 1.
- 1865: Ernest James Myers (Balliol and Wadham) for a Theocritean idyll: Ægon et Milo, qui ad Olympicum certamen profecti erant, domum redeuntes, inter se loquuntur.
- 1866: George Nutt (New College) for comic iambics: Henry IV, Part II, Act 1. Sc. 2.
- 1867: Alexander James Montgomerie Bell (Balliol) for Homeric hexameters: Necryomanteia sive Dante Poeta apud Inferos.
- 1868: Richard Lewis Nettleship (Balliol) for tragic iambics: Shelley's Prometheus Unbound, Act 2, Sc. 4.
- 1869: John Arthur Godley (Balliol) for Theocritean verse: Shakespeare's Cymbeline, Act 4, Sc. 2.
- 1870: Walter Sumner Gibson (Balliol) for comic iambic verse: Henry IV, Part II, Act 5, Sc. 1.
- 1871: Edward Byron Nicholson (Trinity, and Bodley's librarian) for heroic hexameters: Ἄστρων νυκτέρων ὁμήγυρις.
- 1872: Thomas Agar (Christ Church) for tragic iambic verse: Byron's Manfred, Act 1, "The Spirits I have raised..."
- 1873: Alfred Joshua Butler for Homeric verse: Paradise Lost 4.634-705.
- 1874: Edward Maclaine Field (Trinity) for comic iambics: Henry IV, Part I, Act 5 Sc. 4.
- 1875: Thomas Herbert Warren (Balliol and Magdalen) for an idyll: The Ruins of Athens.
- 1876: Arthur Elam Haigh (Corpus Christi) for tragic iambics: Shakespeare's Julius Caesar, Act 1, Sc. 2.
- 1877: Sidney Graves Hamilton (Balliol and Hertford) for Homeric hexameters: Paradise Lost 4.223-287.
- 1878: Alfred Denis Godley (Balliol) for comic iambics: the Hampshire farmer's address in Rejected Addresses.
- 1879: Alfred Temple Roberts (Magdalen) for idyllic hexameters: Milton's Lycidas 5.132.
- 1880: Ernest Alfred Upcott (Balliol) for tragic iambics: Paradise Lost 4.32-113.
- 1881: Christopher Cookson (Corpus Christi) for idyllic hexameter's: Matthew Arnold's Thyrsis.
- 1882: William Ross Hardie (Balliol) for comic iambics: Shakespeare's Twelfth Night, Act 2, Sc. 5
- 1883: Cecil Henry St Leger Russell (Trinity) for Homeric hexameters: The Death of Zohrab and Rustum.
- 1884: Harry Hammond House (Corpus Christi) for iambics: Henry IV, Part II, Act 1, Sc. 1.
- 1885: John Undershell Powell (St. John's) for idyllic hexameters" Shelley's Adonaïs 39–66.
- 1886: Gilbert Murray (St. John's) for comic iambics: Henry IV, Part II, Act 3, Sc. 2.
- 1887: Frederick William Hall (Trinity) for Homeric hexameters: Paradise Lost 6.746-785.
- 1888: Frank Fletcher (Balliol) for tragic iambics: Shelley's Cenci, Act 5, Sc. 4.
- 1889: René Louis Alphonse Du Pontet (Trinity) for hexameters on Columbus.
- 1890: William Martin Geldart (Balliol) for comic iambics: Henry V, Act 2, Sc. 3.
- 1891: William Frederick Lofthouse (Trinity) for idyllic hexameters: 'Country Cousins at the Jubilee' (Et quæ tanta fuit Romam tibi causa vivendi).
- 1892: Wilfred Ormrod Bailey (Trinity) for tragic iambics: Milton's Samson Agonistes 1570–1660.
- 1893: Herbert Sidebotham (Balliol) for idyllic hexameters: Lycidas 15–84.
- 1894: George Stuart Robertson (New College) for comic iambic verse: Henry IV, Part II, Act 2, Sc. 2.
- 1895: Frank Lloyd Edwards (New College) for tragic iambic verse: Matthew Arnold's Merope.
- 1896: Edward L. D. Cole (Balliol) for hexameters: Virgil's Aeneid 2.162-249.
- 1897: W. F. Nicholson (Balliol) for Theocritean hexameters: Thomson's Castle of Indolence 1.2-12.
- 1898: James Alexander Webster (Magdalen) for iambic verse: Marlowe's Edward II, Act 5, Sc. 1.
- 1899: Harold Trevor Baker (New College) for comic iambic verse: Ben Jonson's Every Man in His Humour, Act 1, Sc. 4.
- 1900: Julius Victor Scholderer (Trinity) for hexameters: R.L. Stevenson's Rahéro.
- 1901: Frederick Lewisohn (Trinity) for Theocritean verse: Milton's Comus 244–330.
- 1902: Edward William Macleay Grigg (New College) for iambic verse: Richard III, Act 1, Sc. 2.
- 1903: H. L. Henderson (Christ Church) for comic iambics: Henry IV, Part II, Act 3, Sc. 2.
- 1904: Cyril Charles Martindale (Pope's Hall [now Campion Hall]) for hexameters: Virgil's Georgics 4.450-547.
- 1905: F. A. B. Newman (Univ) for Theocritean hexameters: Spenser's Shepherd's Calendar: Aegloga Sexta.
- 1906: Leslie Whitaker Hunter (New College) for elegiac verse: Tennyson's Lotos-Eaters.
- 1907: William Alexander Bain (Christ Church) for tragic iambics: Byron's Marino Faliero, Act 4, Sc. 2.
- 1908: Ronald Arbuthnott Knox (Balliol) for Theocritean hexameters: Robert Browning's Pippa Passes III. 'Evening: Talk By the Way'.
- 1909: Algernon E. F. Spencer (Christ Church) for comic iambics: Sheridan's School for Scandal, Act 4, Sc. 1.
- 1910: Roderick McKenzie (Trinity) for Homeric hexameters: Virgil's Aeneid 2.268-385.
- 1911: Edgar Lobel (Balliol) for tragic iambics: Racine's Esther 3.1-3.
- 1912: Thomas Farrant Higham for Theocritean hexameters: George Meredith's Love in the Valley 1–9.
- 1913: George Dunn (Corpus Christi) for elegiacs: Pope's Elegy to the Memory of an Unfortunate Lady.
- 1914: Frank Newton Tribe for tragic iambics: Browning's Strafford, Act 5, Sc. 2, lines 268-end.
- 1915: Reuben Cohen for comic iambics: Oliver Goldsmith's She Stoops to Conquer, Act 2.
- 1916: Godfrey Rolles Driver (New College) for A.H. Clough's Amour de Voyage [printed 1919].
- 1920: John Blackburne Poynton for Browning's Balaustion's Adventure, lines 11-139.
- 1921: Asher Hyman for hexameters: from Virgil's 4th Georgic, lines 425–527.
- 1922: Robert Graham Cockrane Levens for Shakespeare's Midsummer Night's Dream, Act 3, Sc. 1.
- 1923: Cedric A. L. Cliffe for Racine's Athalie, Act 2, Sc. 5.
- 1924: Edmond Patrick Charles Cotter for Tennyson's Godiva.
- 1925: Henri Nicolas de Villiers for iambics: Byron's Cain, Act 3.
- 1927: Ronald Syme (Oriel) for Homeric hexameters: a passage of Morris's The Story of Sigurd the Volsung and the Fall of the Niblungs.
- 1928: Denys Lionel Page for Greek tragic iambics: John Masefield's Pompey the Great, Act 2, Sc. 1.
- 1929: Noël Kilpatrick Hutton for 'The Sad Shepherd', from Yeats's "The Wild Swans at Coole".
- 1930: Brian Davidson for a translation of Addison's Cato, 4.4-5.1.
- 1931: John Saye Wingfield Twistleton-Wykeham-Fiennes for comic verse: W.S. Gilbert's The Mikado, or The Town of Titipu.
- 1932: Archibald David Manisty Ross for 'The Story of Glam', from The Saga of Grettir the Strong.
- 1933: Thomas Hunter Steen Wyllie for the 'Prologue in Heaven' from Goethe's Faust.
- 1934: (William) Spencer Barrett (Christ Church) for Congreve's Mourning Bride.
- 1935: A. T. G. Holmes for Tennyson's Tithonus.
- 1937: H. Thomson for Sheridan's The Rivals, Act 3, Sc. 1.
- 1938: Christopher Montague Woodhouse (New College) for Pope's Sappho to Phaon 2.179-end.
- 1939: Kenneth Dover (Balliol) for lines from Racine's Phèdre, Act 1, Sc. 1, lines 1–133.
- 1995: No prize awarded (but honourably mentioned: Martin Revermann of Corpus Christi).
- 1996: Jeremy Grant (Worcester).
- 1998: No prize awarded (but honourably mentioned: Letizia Palladini of Balliol).
- 1999: Luke Pitcher (Somerville).
- 2000: Laura Bender (Magdalen).
- 2016: Andrew Jones (Queen's) for tragic trimeter: Virgil's Aeneid 4.9-38.
- 2018: Joost Botman (Queen's) & Phillip Bone (Exeter) for tragic and comic trimeter respectively: a passage from Shakespeare's A Winter's Tale.
- 2019: Jason Webber (Exeter) for tragic trimeter: a passage from Shakespeare's Measure for Measure.
- 2020: Nicholas Stone (Christ Church) for tragicomic trimeter: a passage from Wordsworth's 'The Brothers Poem'.
- 2021: Benjamin Goodrick (Trinity) for tragic trimeter: a passage from Shakespeare's Richard the Third.
- 2022: Althea Sovani (Somerville)
- 2023: David Dunn (Balliol) for tragic trimeter: a passage from Christopher Marlowe's Tamburlaine
- 2025: Matthias Erbacher (Blackfriars) for tragic trimeter.
- 2026: Beth Parker (Brasenose) for tragic trimeter: a passage from Larkin.

== Winners of the Gaisford Prize for Greek Prose ==
- 1857: Robert Dobie Wilson (Balliol) for Empedocles, Dialogues Græcus.
- 1858: George Rankine Luke (Balliol) for Nicias, sive De superstitione.
- 1859: Henry Nettleship (Corpus Christi and Lincoln) for Pygmaeorum Civitas.
- 1860: James Bryce (Trinity and Oriel) for The Plague of London, in the style of Thucydides.
- 1861: Charles Bigg (Corpus Christi and Christ Church) for Milo, sive de Gymnastica.
- 1862: Charles John Pearson (Corpus Christi) for Timæus Novus, sive De Geologia: Dialogus Platonicus.
- 1863: Augustine Ley (Christ Church) for Marco Polo: Narratio ad Examplar Herodoteum.
- 1864: A Platonic Dialogue, Socrates apud inferos more suo Atheniensum principes reipublicæ interrogat. [Not awarded.]
- 1865: William Henry Simcox (Queen's) for Sancti Ludovici mors, res gestæ, ingenium, after Thucydides.
- 1866: Francis de Paravicini (Balliol and Christ Church) for Cratylus, sive de hominum sermonis origine.
- 1867: William Wallace (Balliol and later Merton) for The Aztecs in Herodotean style.
- 1868: Alfred Goodwin (Balliol) for Ἀμαζόνες ἀντιάνειραι, a Platonic dialogue.
- 1869: Robert Lowes Clarke (Balliol) for The Reign of Terror, in the style of Thucydides.
- 1870: John Arthur Godley (Balliol) for Φειδίας ἢ περὶ ἀνδριαντοποιΐας: a Platonic dialogue.
- 1871: George Edward Jeans (Pembroke and Hertford) for Iceland: in Herodotean prose
- 1872: Alfred Joshua Butler (Trinity and Brasenose) for Ullane sint reconditioris doctrinæ vestigia apud Homerum reperienda?
- 1873: William Wardlaw Waddell (Balliol) for The Siege of Londonderry, in the style of Thucydides.
- 1874: [No Candidate], A Platonic dialogue, "Esse aliquid manes". De spectris et simulacris mortuorum quid revera sentiendum sit.
- 1875: Edward Maclaine Field (Trinity) for The Sources of the Nile. Prose in the Style of Herodotus (Viator Anglus Nili fontes explorans quæ viderit narrat.).
- 1876: George Spencer Bower (New College) for a Platonic dialogue, Socrates Aristophanes Sophocles de Arte Poetarum inter se colloquuntur.
- 1877: Arthur Elam Haigh for The Popish Plot, in the style of Thucydides.
- 1878: Philip Edward Raynor (New College) for a Platonic dialogue, Ἀναξίμανδρος ἢ περὶ ζῴων γενέσεως.
- 1879: David Samuel Margoliouth (New College) for Japanorum reipublicæ conversio.
- 1880: William Yorke Fausset (Balliol) for a Platonic dialogue, De Œconomia quam vocant Politica.
- 1881: Richard Edmund Mitcheson (St. John's) for Speeches in accusation and defence of Warren Hastings.
- 1882: William Ross Hardie for a Platonic dialogue, Δημηγορία, Τίς ἐστιν ἡ ποιητική (Inter Rhetoricam et Poeticam quid intersit).
- 1883: William Edward Long (Magdlalen) for The Wandering Jew, in the style of Herodotus.
- 1884: Cecil Henry St Leger Russell (Trinity) for The Athenian state: a platonic dialogue.
- 1885: Walter Ashburner (Balliol and Merton) for The Spanish Armada in the style of Thucydides.
- 1886: Michael Henry Mansel Wood (Trinity) for Prometheus sive De hominum natura et origine, a Platonic dialogue.
- 1887: Gilbert Murray (St. John's) for Mesolonghi Capta (in the Historical Register (1900) as Missolonghi Capta).
- 1888: Frederick William Hall (Trinity) for Πότερον ἐὰν ἀπόληται τὸ κακὸν οὐδὲ πεινῆν ἔτι ἔστι ἢ διψῆν, ἤ τι ἄλλο τῶν τοιούτων... (or De origine Mali).
- 1889: Reginald Carter (Balliol) for The Battle of Inkermann, in the style of Thucydides.
- 1890: Henry Stuart Jones (Balliol) for Δάμων ἢ περὶ μουσικῆς or De origine et vi artis musicæ.
- 1891: Julian James Cotton (Corpus Christi) for The Story of Husain and the Mohurram Celebration in the East.
- 1892: Philip Herbert Hanson (Balliol) for Νικίας: Τῆς ἄνω ὁδοῦ ἀεὶ ἐσόμεθα.
- 1893: Wilfred Ormrod Bailey (Trinity) for A supposed speech of Abraham Lincoln on the occasion of his second election to the presidency of the United States, in the style of Thucydides.
- 1894: Herbert Sidebotham for Ἀριστοφάνης ἢ περὶ τοῦ γελοίου.
- 1895: George Stuart Robertson (New College) for Herodotus in Britain.
- 1896: Prose in the manner of Socrates: A Defence of Despotism. [Not awarded.]
- 1897: Edward Launcelot Davey Cole (Balliol) for Wordsworth 'Of the Principles of Poetry' and the 'Lyrical Ballads'.
- 1898: Ernest Ely Genner (Balliol) for On the Causes and Conditions of Naval Supremacy.
- 1899: Frederick Herbert Williamson (Balliol) for The Principle of Isolation in British Foreign Policy.
- 1900 Heathcote William Garrod (Balliol) for Erasmus on the Renascence of Literature.
- 1902: James McLean Watson (Oriel) for Relations Between a Mother Country and her Colonies.
- 1903: Robert William Chapman (Oriel) for Advantages of an Academy of Letters.
- 1904: William Moir Calder (Christ Church) for The Possibility of a Federal Union of the English-Speaking Peoples.
- 1905: Thomas Williams Phillips (Jesus) for Imperatores Divus Iulius et Napoleon de rebus a se domi militiaeque gestis apud inferos colloquuntur.
- 1906: Hugh McKinnon Wood (Balliol) for Διογένης ἢ περὶ παρρησίας.
- 1907: John Davidson Beazley (Balliol) for Herodotus at the Zoo.
- 1908: Leslie Whitaker Hunter (New College) for Warren Hastings' Defence of his Administration in India.
- 1909: George Douglas Brooks (Worcester) for The Relation between Art and Morality.
- 1911: George Leicester Marriott (Exeter) for A Dialogue Between Socrates, Agathon and Aristophanes, τοῦ αὐτοῦ ἀνδρὸς εἶναι κωμῳδίαν καὶ τραγῳδίαν ἐπίστασθαι ποιεῖν.
- 1912: Cecil John Ellingham for Πορφυρίων Δίης Τύραννος.
- 1913: Godfrey Rolles Driver (New College) for Στάσεως ἐν Βρεταννοῖς γενομένης, λέγει μὲν ὁ προστάτης τοῦ δήμου, ἀντιλέγει δὲ ὁ στρατηγός...
- 1914: Harry Samuels for Crates, sive De vita simplici, a dialogue.
- 1915: Robert Walter Theodore Gordon Scott for Panama.
- 1921: Christian James Fordyce (Balliol) for Herodotus in Ireland: being part of the third book of his account of Britain.
- 1922: William Francis Ross Hardie (Balliol) for A Lucianic dialogue between Socrates in Hades and certain men of the present day.
- 1923: Basil Edward Butler for Ἡράκλειτος, a translation of a passage from Prof. Eddington's Romanes lecture (1922).
- 1926: Ronald Syme (Oriel) for a section of Thomas More's Utopia into Platonic prose.
- 1927: Colin Hardie (Balliol).
- 1930: Peter J. McGowen for a translation of Leo Tolstoy's The First Step, chapter 7.
- 1931: John Langshaw Austin (Balliol).
- 1932: Humphry Gilbert Bohun Lynch (Merton) for a translation of the Areopagitica.
- 1933: Arthur Frederick Hall for Boswell's Life of Johnson (Everyman Edition, vol. 1, pp. 272–275) in the style of Lucian.
- 1934: W.H. Walsh for Envoys from Russia and Japan seek alliance with Chinese Republic.
- 1936: John Godfrey Griffith for a translation of Tolstoy's Thou Shalt Not Kill.
- 1937: Henry Arthur Pears Fisher for Burke's Letters on a Regicide Peace.
- 1938: Vincent Turner for A.E. Housman's Introductory Lecture (1892).
- 1939: David Penistan Simpson for Characters in the Style of Theophrastus: the Snob, the Prig, and the Pedant.
- 1948: John Francis Bligh for Thomas Erskine's Speech in Defence of Mr. John Frost, 1793.
- 1952: Jeremy Morse
- 1981: Armand D'Angour (Merton).
- 1995: Deborah W. Rooke (Regent's Park).
- 1996: Holger Gzella (Worcester).
- 1997: Martin Revermann (Corpus Christi).
- 1998: Sinead Willis (New College).
- 1999: Letizia Poli-Palladini (Balliol).
- 2000: Luke Pitcher (Somerville).
- 2002: Oliver Thomas (New College).
- 2009: Christopher White (Magdalen).
- 2019: Lucas Jones (Magdalen).
- 2020: Jason Webber (Magdalen).
- 2021: Nicholas Stone (Christ Church).
- 2022: Lucas Barron (Magdalen).
- 2023: Althea Sovani (Somerville).
- 2024: Aron Szocs (Harris Manchester).

== Winners of the Gaisford Essay Prize ==
- 1996: Ben Rowland (Balliol).
- 1997: Nicholas Larkin (Brasenose).
- 1998: No prize awarded (but honourably mentioned: David Hodgkinson, Balliol).
- 2007: Sarah Cullinan (Oriel).
- 2008: Robert Colborn (New College).
- 2009: Scott Liddle (New College).
- 2014: Supratik Baralay (Wadham College).

== Winners of the Gaisford Dissertation Prize ==
- 1987: Richard Maxwell Gaskin (St Edmund Hall), Tragedy and Subjectivity in Virgil’s Aeneid.
- 1998: No prize awarded.
- 1999: Letizia Poli-Palladini (Balliol) and Tobias Reinhardt (Corpus Christi) jointly.
- 2002: Wolfgang David Cirilo de Melo (jointly), for work on the Latin verb system.
- 2008: Oliver Thomas (New College and Balliol).
- 2014: Thomas Nelson (University).
- 2015: Ella Grunberger-Kirsh (Exeter).
- 2017: Timothy Foot (Merton) and Elinor Garnett (Christ Church) jointly.
- 2019: Dan Byam Shaw (Magdalen) and Sebastian Hyams (Christ Church).
- 2021: Charles Baker (New College).
- 2023: Christopher G. Lu (Balliol College).
- 2024: Alexander Christensen (Blackfriars Hall) and Finn Jarvis (Trinity).

== Notable winning entries ==
John Davidson Beazley's winning entry for the 1907 Greek Prose prize, Herodotus at the Zoo, was reprinted by Blackwell in 1911 and later appeared in a collection of classical parodies produced in Switzerland in 1968. The Oxford Dictionary of National Biography calls it "an enchanting work".

George Stuart Robertson won the prize for Greek Verse in 1894 with a translation of a hundred lines of Shakespeare into comic iambic verse, and the next year he won the prize for Greek Prose and a Blue for hammer throwing. He heard about the 1896 Summer Olympics, the first of the modern era, and later explained "Greek classics were my proper academic field, so I could hardly resist a go at the Olympics, could I?" On arrival in Athens, he found to his dismay that his discipline of hammer throwing was not to be competed in, so in the spirit of amateurism he entered the shot put, the discus and the tennis. In the discus, he recorded the Games' worst ever throw, and in the tennis doubles he lost his only match but nevertheless won a Bronze Medal. In a ceremony after the Games, Robertson recited an ode to athletic prowess which he had composed in Greek.

Between 1953 and 1956, C. G. R. Leach won all four University prizes for composition in classical languages – the Gaisford Greek Verse and Prose prizes, and the Chancellor's Prizes for Latin Verse and Prose – while his brother J. H. C. Leach won three and was runner-up for a fourth.

== In fiction ==
In Max Beerbohm's satirical tragedy of undergraduate life at Oxford, Zuleika Dobson (1911), the hero, called the Duke of Dorset, has won one of the Prizes:

At Eton he had been called "Peacock", and this nick-name had followed him up to Oxford. It was not wholly apposite, however. For, whereas the peacock is a fool even among birds, the Duke had already taken (besides a particularly brilliant First in Mods) the Stanhope, the Newdigate, the Lothian, and the Gaisford Prize for Greek Verse.

== See also ==
- Bowdoin Prizes at Harvard University

== See also ==
- List of awards named after people
- List of British literary awards
- List of poetry awards
- List of years in poetry
- List of years in literature
