= Frank Goldsmith (disambiguation) =

Frank Goldsmith (1878–1967) was a British Conservative Party politician.

Frank or Francis Goldsmith may also refer to:

- Frank John William Goldsmith (1902–1982), Titanic survivor
- Zac Goldsmith, member of the House of Lords and former mayoral candidate for London
- Francis Goldsmith (MP for Chippenham), MP for Mitchell, Chippenham and Helston
- Francis Edward Goldsmith, medical doctor in South Australia
