= Public Orator =

Traditional post at UK universities

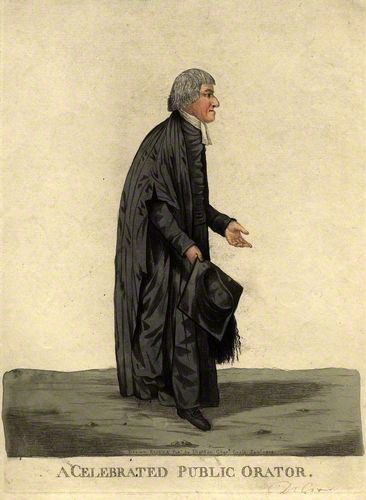
William Crowe (1745–1829), Public Orator at the University of Oxford.

The Public Orator is a traditional official post at universities, especially in the United Kingdom. The holder of this office acts as the voice of the university on public occasions.

The position at Oxford University dates from 1564. The Public Orator at the university presents honorary degrees, giving an oration for each person that is honoured. They may be required to compose addresses and letters as directed by the Hebdomadal Council of the university. Speeches when members of the royal family are present may also be required. The post was instituted for a visit to Oxford by Queen Elizabeth I in 1566. The Public Orator, Thomas Kingsmill, gave a very long historical speech. Sir Isaac Wake addressed King James I similarly in 1605.

At the University of Cambridge, the title for the position changed from "Public Orator" to "Orator" in 1926. Trinity College Dublin in Ireland also has a Public Orator. There is no equivalent position in American universities.

== List of Public Orators ==
=== England ===
==== Oxford University ====
See also Category:Public Orators of the University of Oxford.

- Roger Marbeck (1564–1565)
- Thomas Kingsmill (1565–1569)
- Tobias Matthew (1569–1572)
- Arthur Atye (1572–1582)
- Thomas Smith (1582–1594)
- Thomas Wenman (1594–1597)
- Thomas Cole (1597–1601)
- William James (1601–1604)
- Isaac Wake (1604–1621)
- John King (1622–1625)
- Philip King (1625–1629)
- William Strode (1629–1645)
- Henry Hammond (1645–1648)
- Edward Corbet (1648)
- Ralph Button (1648–1660)
- Robert South (1660–1677)
- Thomas Cradock (1677–1679)
- William Wyatt (1679–1712)
- Digby Cotes (1712-1746)
- Thomas Lisle (1746–1749)
- Roger Mather (1749–1760)
- Thomas Nowell (1760-1776)
- James Bandinel (1776–1784)
- William Crowe (1784–1829)
- John Antony Cramer (1829–1842)
- William Jacobson (1842–1848)
- Richard Michell (1849–1877)
- Francis Thomas Dallin (1877–1880)
- William Walter Merry (1880–1910)
- A.D. Godley (1910–1925)
- Arthur Blackburne Poynton (1925–1932)
- Cyril Bailey (1932–1939)
- Thomas Farrant Higham (1939–1958)
- A.N. Bryan-Brown (1958–1967)
- Colin Hardie (1967–1973)
- John G. Griffith (1973–1980)
- Godfrey Bond (1980–1992)
- Jasper Griffin (1992–2004)
- Richard Henry Austen Jenkyns (2004–2016)
- Jonathan Katz (2016 to present)

==== Cambridge University ====
See also Category:Cambridge University Orators.

- Richard Croke (1522)
- George Day (1528–1537)
- John Redman (1537–1538)
- Sir Thomas Smith (1538–1542)
- Sir John Cheke (1544)
- Roger Ascham (1546–1554)
- Thomas Gardiner (1554–1557)
- John Stokes (1557–1559)
- George Ackworth (1559–1560)
- Anthony Girlington (1560–1561)
- William Masters (1563–1565)
- Thomas Byng (1565–1570)
- William Lewin (1570–1571)
- John Becon (1571–1573)
- Richard Bridgewater (1573–1581)
- Anthony Wingfield (1580–1589)
- Henry Mowtlow (1589–1594)
- Sir Robert Naunton (1594–1611)
- Sir Francis Nethersole (1611–1619)
- George Herbert (1619–1627)
- Robert Creighton (1627–1639)
- Henry Molle (1639–1650)
- Ralph Widdrington (1650–1673)
- Henry Paman (1674–1681)
- John Billers (1681–1688)
- Henry Felton (1689–1696)
- William Ayloffe (1696–1726)
- Edmund Castle (1727–1730)
- Philip Williams (1730–1741)
- James Tunstall (1741–1746)
- Philip Yonge (1746–1752)
- John Skynner (1752–1762)
- William Barford (1762–1768)
- Richard Beadon (1768–1778)
- William Pearce (1778–1788)
- William Lort Mansel (1788–1798)
- Edmund Outram (1798–1809)
- Ralph Tatham (1809–1836)
- Christopher Wordsworth (February–April 1836)
- William Henry Bateson (1848–1857)
- William George Clark (1857–1869)
- Sir Richard Claverhouse Jebb (1869–1875)
- Sir John Edwin Sandys (1875–1920; orator emeritus from 1920)
- Terrot Reaveley Glover (1920–1939)
- William Keith Chambers Guthrie (1939–1957)
- Lancelot Patrick Wilkinson (1958–1974)
- Frank Henry Stubbings (1974–1982)
- James Diggle (1982–1993)
- Anthony Bowen (1993–2007)
- Rupert Thompson (2008 to present)

==== Liverpool University ====
- E T Campagnac (1927 to 1931)
- Lyon Blease (1931 to 1949)
- Seaborne Davies (1950 to 1955)
- F. W. Walbank (1956 to 1960)
- Kenneth Muir (1961 to 1965)
- Roland Gregory Austin (1965 to 1968)
- Louis Rosenhead (1969 to 1972)
- Basil Smallman (1972 to 1973)
- John M Meek (1973 to 1976)
- Reginald T Davies (1977 to 1980)
- A. A. Long (1981 to 1983)
- John Pinsent (1983 to 1987)
- J Frederick Norbury (1987 to 1992)
- John E Utting (1992 to 1993)
- John N Tarn (1994 to 2002)
- C J Gaskell (2003 to 2015)
- Bruce Gibson (2015 to present)

==== Durham University ====
- Sir Ian Richmond (1949 to 1951)

==== Birkbeck, University of London ====
- Steven Connor (2001 to 2012)
- Joanna Bourke (2012 to present)

=== Ireland ===
==== Trinity College, Dublin ====
- Caesar Williamson (1660)
- Thomas Ebenezer Webb (1879 to 1887)
- Arthur Palmer (1888 – no later than 1897)
- Robert Yelverton Tyrrell (1899)
- Louis Claude Purser (1904)
- Sir Robert Tate, (1914 to 1952)
- John V. Luce, (1972 to 2005)
- Brian McGing, (2005 to 2008)
- Anna Chahoud, (2008 to present)

=== Russia ===
==== Lomonosov Moscow State University ====
- Alexei Solopov (1994 to present)

== See also ==
- Public speaking
