= Thomas Farrant Higham =

Classics scholar

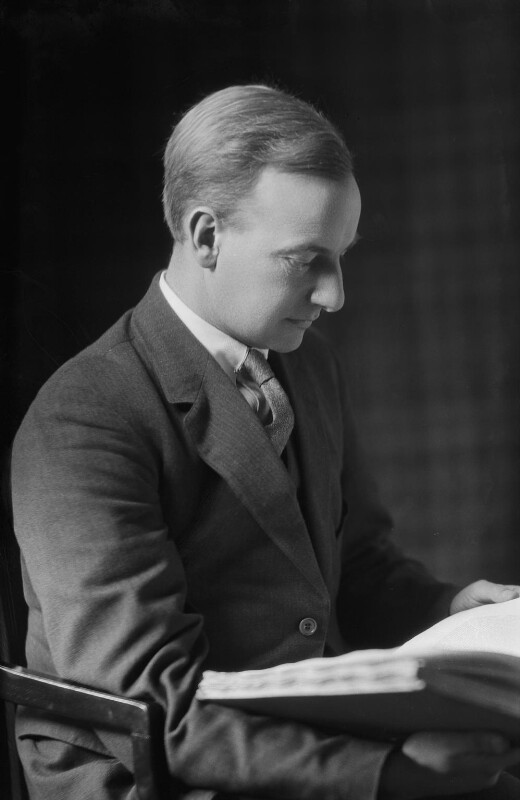
- Higham aged 35/6, 16 December 1926
- Born: 20 September 1890; Kesari, Punjab, British Raj
- Died: 29 January 1975 (aged 84); Oxford, Oxfordshire, England
- Spouse: Mary Elizabeth Rogers (m. 1915)
- Children: 2 (son and daughter)

Academic background
- Education: Clifton College, Bristol
- Alma mater: Trinity College, Oxford

Academic work
- Discipline: Classics

Thomas Farrant Higham (20 September 1890 – 29 January 1975) was an English classical scholar and translator. He was a fellow of Trinity College, Oxford from 1914 to 1958, and Public Orator of the University of Oxford from 1939 to 1958. He also saw active service during the First World War, first with the Oxfordshire and Buckinghamshire Light Infantry and then as a translator with the British Salonika Army.

== Early life and education ==
Higham was born in Kesari, Punjab, then part of the British Raj, to English parents Thomas and Eliza Higham. The family shortly thereafter returned to England and Thomas was educated at Clifton College before going up to Trinity College, Oxford to read classics, gaining a First in Honour Moderations and the 1912 Gaisford Prize for Greek verse composition. (He submitted a translation, into Theocritean hexameters, of the first nine lines of George Meredith's Love in the Valley).

== Career ==
=== Academic career ===
He was elected a fellow of Trinity College, Oxford, his alma mater, in 1914. Having returned from the First World War, he served as dean from 1919 to 1933. He was senior tutor of this college from 1938 to 1939, and, following a break during the Second World War, from 1945 to 1948.

He was additionally pro-proctor for the University of Oxford for the 1921/22 and 1927/28 academic years, and then as senior proctor for the 1932/33 academic year. From 1939 to 1958, he was Public Orator of Oxford University.

He retired from the University of Oxford in 1958, and was made an emeritus fellow of his college.

He was a visiting professor in classics at Stanford University, California, from 1962 to 1963.

=== War service ===
With the outbreak of the First World War, Higham joined the British Army. He was commissioned as a temporary second lieutenant on 22 December 1914. He then served with the 9th (Service) Battalion, Oxfordshire and Buckinghamshire Light Infantry. On 14 May 1916, he was transferred to the general list in the temporary rank of lieutenant to work as an interpreter. He served with the British Forces in Salonika from 1916 to 1919. He was promoted to temporary captain on 1 May 1918. On 4 March 1919, he relinquished his commission, thereby ending his military service, and was allowed to retain the rank of captain. In 1919, he was awarded the Medal of Military Merit (4th class) by the King of Greece.

During the Second World War, he was attached to the Foreign Office (1940–1945).

== Personal life ==
In 1915, he married Mary Elizabeth Rogers. Together they had one son and one daughter.

He died in retirement at Oxford on 29 January 1975.

== Works ==
=== As editor ===
- (with Gilbert Murray, Cyril Bailey, E. A. Barber, C. M. Bowra) The Oxford Book of Greek Verse (Oxford: Clarendon Press, 1930)
- (with C. M. Bowra) The Oxford Book of Greek Verse in Translation (Oxford: Clarendon Press, 1938)

=== As author ===
- The Hoopoe's Call of Aristophanes (London: Hampden Press, 1945)
- Orationes Oxonienses selectae; short Latin speeches on distinguished contemporaries (Oxford: Clarendon Press, 1960)
