= Thomas Kingsmill =

Thomas Kingsmill may refer to:

- Thomas Kingsmill (professor) (fl. 1565), English academic, Regius Professor of Hebrew at Oxford from 1570
- Thomas Kingsmill (Hawkhurst Gang) (c. 1720–1749), leader of the notorious Hawkhurst Gang of smugglers
- Thomas Kingsmill (water polo) (born 1994), New Zealand water polo player
