= W. F. R. Hardie =

Scottish classicist, philosopher, and academic (1902–1990)

- Born: William Francis Ross Hardie; 25 April 1902; Edinburgh, Scotland
- Died: 30 September 1990 (aged 88); Oxford, Oxfordshire, England
- Spouse: Isobel (m. 1938)
- Children: 2
- Relatives: Prof William Hardie (father); Colin Hardie (brother)

Academic background
- Education: Balliol College, Oxford

Academic work
- Discipline: Classics
- Sub-discipline: Ancient philosophy; Plato; Aristotle; Ethics
- Institutions: Magdalen College, Oxford; Corpus Christi College, Oxford
- Notable students: Isaiah Berlin, Paul Grice

William Francis Ross "Frank" Hardie (25 April 1902 – 30 September 1990) was a Scottish classicist, philosopher and academic. He was President of Corpus Christi College, Oxford, from 1950 to 1969.

== Early life and education ==
Hardie was born on 25 April 1902 in Edinburgh, Scotland to William Hardie, classical scholar. His brother, Colin, also went on to become a successful classicist. He was educated at Edinburgh Academy, then an all-boys private school. He studied literae humaniores ("Classics") at Balliol College, Oxford, graduating with a double first Bachelor of Arts (BA) degree in 1924: he was awarded a number of undergraduate prizes in classics and philosophy.

== Academic career ==
Hardie spent 1925 as a fellow by examination at Magdalen College, Oxford. In 1926, he was appointed to a tutorial fellowship at Corpus Christi College, Oxford. He was the college tutor in philosophy and notable tutees included Isaiah Berlin, Paul Grice, and J. O. Urmson, who reported that Hardie "when a tutor, turned out many more first-rate philosophers than most."

Hardie became President of Corpus Christi College in 1950, (being replaced as philosophy tutor by David Pears) and during his tenure saw the college fellowship double and the student numbers increase. He retired in 1969 and was appointed an honorary fellow by his college.

Hardie has also been credited with naming the academic discipline of psephology, the study of voting behaviours and the statistical analysis of elections, but this has been disputed.

== Personal life ==
Im 1938, Hardie married Isobel St Maur Macaulay. Together they had two sons.

Hardie died on 30 September 1990 in Oxford, England.

== Works ==
- A Study in Plato. Oxford: Oxford University Press. 1936.
- Naturalistic Ethics. London: British Academy. 1947.
- Aristotle's Ethical Theory. Oxford: Oxford University Press. 1968.
