= Olive Purser =

First woman scholar of Trinity College Dublin

- Born: Olive Constance Purser; 15 July 1886; Parsonstown
- Died: 12 April 1973 (aged 86)
- Education: Trinity College Dublin

Olive Purser (1886–1973), was one of the first women to enter Trinity College Dublin and was the first woman to be made a scholar.

== Early life and education ==
Olive Constance Purser was born on 15 July 1886 to Alfred and Ellen Purser. Purser was the youngest of four. She had two sisters and a brother. Her father was a Chief Inspector of National Schools. Within a few years of her birth the family had moved to Rathmines in Dublin where they remained. The family were dedicated to education. Her aunt was Sarah Purser and her uncle was Louis Claude Purser; her two older sisters, Elinor and Luisa, became teachers, and her brother John, in 1911, was a master's student and Assistant to the Professor of Engineering in Birmingham University.

Purser was one of the first women to be admitted to Trinity College Dublin, entering in the Michaelmas term of 1904. Within 2 years of the ban on women being lifted, she had become the first woman to be made a scholar under the TCD system on 11 June 1906. She won it for classics. At the time she achieved this, women were still not permitted to remain in the college after 6pm or to dine with the male students or staff. Purser was a member of the Elizabethan Society started by her fellow student Marion Johnston. Two years after she completed her degree in TCD, Purser become a temporary lecturer at the university, taking over for Edward Dowden. In 1921, the Crewe report (The position of the Classics in the Educational System of the United Kingdom) lists her as Dean of the Women Students when she reports on the education of women and girls. Purser worked with her uncle Louis Purser on the Shanganagh dig. In 1954 she was awarded an honorary LL.D. She later wrote a book on the women of Trinity.

Purser died on 12 April 1973.

== Bibliography ==
- Women in Dublin University, 1904-1954, 1954
- Ancient Pottery at Shanganagh Castle, County Dublin; Proceedings of the Royal Irish Academy; Vol. 37, 1924
- A Welsh Poet of the Seventeenth Century; The Irish Church Quarterly; Vol. 7, 1914
- Fragment of a Celtic Cross Found at Drumcullin, King's County; The Journal of the Royal Society of Antiquaries of Ireland; Vol. 8 1918
