= Jacob Bryant =

English scholar and mythographer (1715–1804)

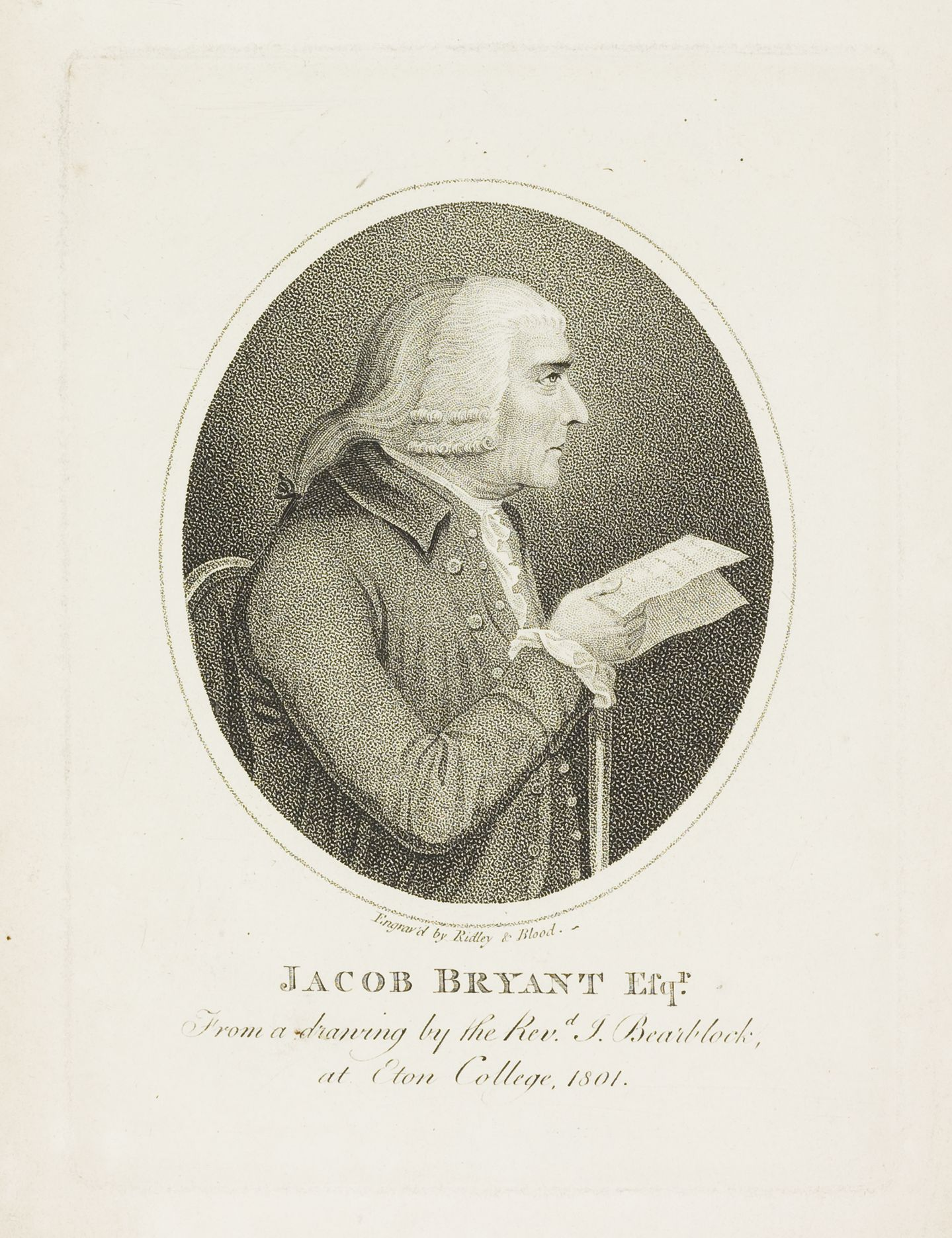
- Born: 1715; Plymouth, Devon
- Died: 14 November 1804 (aged 88–89)
- Occupations: Scholar, mythographer

Jacob Bryant (1715–1804) was an English scholar and mythographer, who has been described as "the outstanding figure among the mythagogues who flourished in the late eighteenth and early nineteenth centuries."

== Life ==
Bryant was born at Plymouth. His father worked in the customs there, but was afterwards moved to Chatham.

Bryant was first sent to a school near Rochester, and then to Eton College. In 1736 he was elected to a scholarship at King's College, Cambridge, where he took his degrees of B.A. (1740) and M.A. (1744), later being elected a fellow.

He returned to Eton as private tutor to the Duke of Marlborough. In 1756 he accompanied the duke, who was master-general of ordnance and commander-in-chief of the forces in Germany, to the Continent as private secretary. He was rewarded by a lucrative appointment in the Board of Ordnance, which allowed him time to indulge his literary tastes. He was twice offered the mastership of Charterhouse school, but turned it down.

Bryant died on 14 November 1804 at Cippenham near Windsor. He left his library to King's College, having previously made some valuable presents from it to the king and the Duke of Marlborough. He bequeathed £2000 to the Society for the Propagation of the Gospel, and £1000 for the use of the retired collegers of Eton.

== Works ==
His chief works were A New System or Analysis of Ancient Mythology (1774–76, and later editions), Observations on the Plain of Troy (1795), and Dissertation concerning the Wars of Troy (1796). He also wrote on theological, political and literary subjects.

=== Mythographer ===
Bryant saw all mythology as derived from the Hebrew scriptures, with Greek mythology arising via the Egyptians. The New System attempted to link the mythologies of the world to the stories recorded in Genesis. Bryant argued that the descendants of Ham had been the most energetic, but also the most rebellious peoples of the world and had given rise to the great ancient and classical civilisations. He called these people "Amonians", because he believed that the Egyptian god Amon was a deified form of Ham. He argued that Ham had been identified with the sun, and that much of pagan European religion derived from Amonian sun worship.

John Richardson was Bryant's chief opponent, in the preface to his Persian Dictionary. In an anonymous pamphlet, An Apology, Bryant defended and reaffirmed his opinions. Richardson then revised the dissertation on languages prefixed to the dictionary, and added a second part: Further Remarks on the New Analysis of Ancient Mythology (1778). Bryant also wrote a pamphlet in answer to Daniel Wyttenbach of Amsterdam, about the same time. Sir William Jones frequently mentions Bryant's model, accepting parts of it and criticising others, particularly his highly conjectural etymologies. He referred to the New System as "a profound and agreeable work", adding that he had read it through three times "with increased attention and pleasure, though not with perfect acquiescence in some other less important parts of his plausible system".

Bryant in the New System acknowledges help from William Barford. His theories are widely credited as an influence on the mythological system of William Blake, who had worked in his capacity as an engraver on the illustrations to Bryant's New System.

=== Classical scholar ===
In his books on Troy, Bryant endeavoured to show that the existence of Troy and the Greek expedition were purely mythological, with no basis in real history. In 1791, Andrew Dalzel translated a work of Jean Baptiste LeChevalier as Description of the Plain of Troy. It provoked Bryant's Observations upon a Treatise ... (on) the Plain of Troy (1795) and A Dissertation concerning the War of Troy (1796?). A fierce controversy resulted, with Bryant attacked by Thomas Falconer, John Morritt, William Vincent, and Gilbert Wakefield.

=== Other works ===
- Bryant's first work was Observations and Enquiries relating to various parts of Ancient History, ... the Wind Euroclydon, the island Melite, the Shepherd Kings, (Cambridge, 1767). Bryant attacked the opinions of Bochart, Beza, Grotius, and Bentley.
- When his account of the Apamean medal was disputed in the Gentleman's Magazine, Bryant defended himself in Apamean Medal and of the Inscription ΝΩΕ, London, 1775. Joseph Hilarius Eckhel upheld his views, but Daines Barrington and others opposed him in the Society of Antiquaries of London.

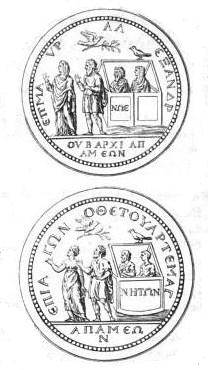
The Apamean medal

- After his friend Robert Wood died in 1771, Bryant edited one of his works as An Essay on the Original Genius and Writings of Homer, with a Comparative View of the Troade (1775).
- Vindiciæ Flavianæ: a Vindication of the Testimony of Josephus concerning Jesus Christ (1777) was anonymous; the second edition, with Bryant's name, was in 1780. The sequel was A Farther Illustration of the Analysis (1778). This work influenced Joseph Priestley.
- An Address to Dr. Priestley ... upon Philosophical Necessity (1780); Priestley printed a reply the same year.
- Bryant was a believer in the authenticity of Thomas Chatterton's fabrications. Chatterton had created poems written in mock Middle English and had attributed them to Thomas Rowley, an imaginary monk of the 15th century. When Thomas Tyrwhitt issued his work The Poems supposed to have been written at Bristol by Thomas Rowley and others,' Bryant with Robert Glynn followed with his Observations on the Poems of Thomas Rowley in which the Authenticity of those Poems is ascertained (2 vols., 1781).
- Gemmarum Antiquarum Delectus (1783) was privately printed at the expense of the Duke of Marlborough, with engravings by Francesco Bartolozzi. The first volume was written in Latin by Bryant, and translated into French by Matthew Maty; the second by William Cole, with the French by Louis Dutens.
- On the Zingara or Gypsey Language (1785) was read by Bryant to the Royal Society, and printed in the seventh volume of Archæologia.
- A disquisition On the Land of Goshen, written about 1767, was published in William Bowyer's Miscellaneous Tracts, 1785.
- A Treatise on the Authenticity of the Scriptures (1791) was anonymous; second edition, with author's name, 1793; third edition, 1810. This work was written at the instigation of the Dowager Countess Pembroke, daughter of his patron, and the profits were given to the hospital for smallpox and inoculation.
- Observations on a controverted passage in Justyn Martyr; also upon the "Worship of Angels", London, 1793.
- Observations upon the Plagues inflicted upon the Egyptians, with maps, London, 1794.
- The Sentiments of Philo-Judæus concerning the Logos or Word of God (1797).
- A treatise against Tom Paine.
- 'Observations upon some Passages in Scripture' (relating to Balaam, Joshua, Samson, and Jonah), London, 1803.

A projected work on the Gods of Greece and Rome was not produced by his executors. Some of his humorous verse in Latin and Greek was published.
