= Thomas Gaisford =

English classical scholar and clergyman (1779 –1855)

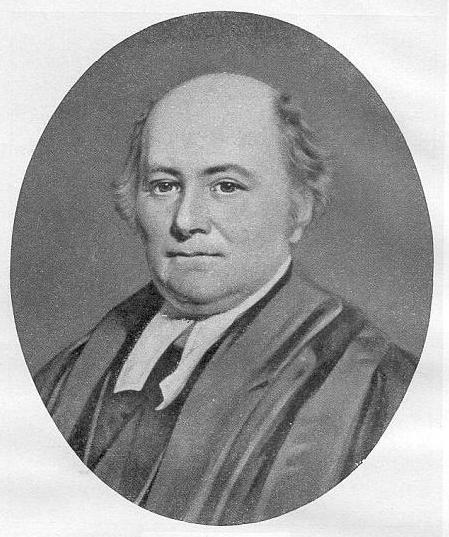
- Thomas Gaisford, portrait taken from the Imagines Philologorum
- Born: 22 December 1779; Iford Manor, Wiltshire, England
- Died: 2 June 1855 (aged 75); Christ Church, Oxford, England
- Resting place: The nave of Christ Church Cathedral, Oxford
- Education: Christ Church, Oxford
- Occupations: Classical scholar, clergyman
- Spouses: Helen Margaret Douglas, 1815–1830 (her death); Jane Catharine Jenkyns, 1832–1855 (his death)
- Children: Five
- Parents: John Gaisford; Sarah Bushall

Thomas Gaisford (22 December 1779 – 2 June 1855) was an English classical scholar and clergyman. He served as Dean of Christ Church from 1831 until his death.

== Early life ==
Gaisford was born at Iford Manor, Wiltshire, the son of John Gaisford. He was educated at Hyde Abbey School, Winchester. He entered Christ Church, Oxford in 1797, graduating B.A. 1801, M.A. 1804, B.D. & D.D. 1831.

== Academic career ==
He became a Student (i.e. a Fellow) at Christ Church in 1800, then a tutor. In 1811, he was appointed Regius Professor of Greek. Taking orders, he held (1815–1847) the college living of Westwell, Oxfordshire, and other ecclesiastical preferments simultaneously with his professorship. In 1829, he was offered the position of Bishop of Oxford, but he turned it down. From 1831 until his death, he was Dean of Christ Church.

As curator of the Bodleian Library and principal delegate of the Oxford University Press, Gaisford was instrumental in securing the co-operation of distinguished European scholars as collators, notably Bekker and Dindorf. His numerous contributions to Greek literature include: Hephaestion's Encheiridion (1810); Poëtae minores Graeci (1814–1820); Stobaeus' Florilegium (1822); Herodotus, with variorum notes (1824); Suidas's Lexicon (1834); Etymologicum Magnum (1848). Eusebius's Praeparatio evangelica (1843) and Demonstratio evangelica (1852). Thomas Edward Brown "won a double first, however, and was elected a fellow of Oriel in April 1854, Dean [Thomas] Gaisford having refused to promote him to a senior studentship of his own college, on the ground that no servitor had ever before attained to that honour. Although at that time an Oriel fellowship conferred a deserved distinction, Brown never took kindly to the life, but, after a few terms of private pupils, returned to the Isle of Man as vice-principal of his old school."

== Personal life ==
On 11 May 1815 Gaisford married Helen Margaret Douglas (1791–1830) the daughter of the Rev. Robert Douglas. They had five children. After she died in 1830, he married Jane Catharine Jenkyns (1787–1863); she was the sister of Dr Richard Jenkyns, master of Balliol College and Dr Henry Jenkyns.

On 23 June 1843, Gaisford's 21-year-old son, William Gaisford, drowned while swimming in the river Thames at Sandford Lock, a notoriously dangerous spot. He got into difficulties and his friend, Richard Phillimore (the son of Joseph Phillimore), entered the water to save him. However, both men perished. They are buried in Christ Church Cathedral. They are commemorated by an obelisk at Sandford Lock and two memorial tablets in the north walk of the Cathedral cloisters.

== Legacy ==
The Gaisford Prize was founded in Gaisford's honour in 1856, shortly after his death. Gaisford Street in Kentish Town, north London, was named in his honour.

== Works ==
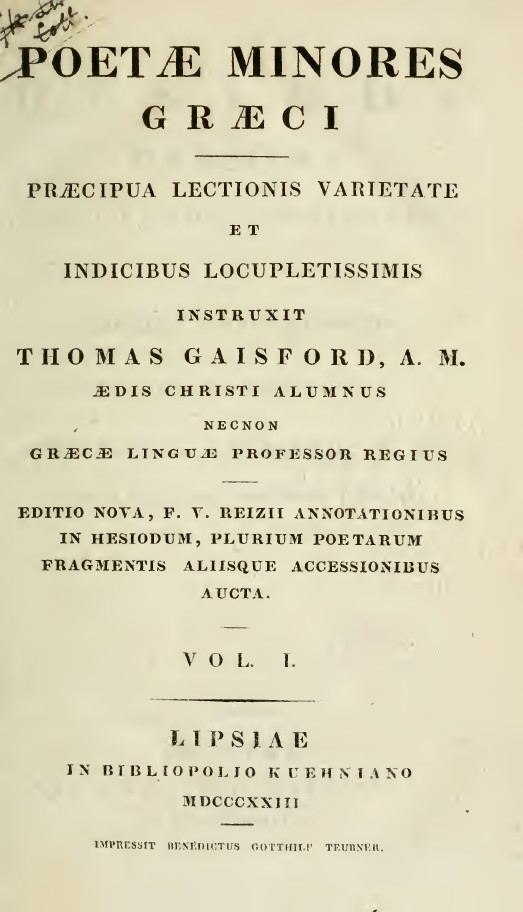
Poetae minores graeci, vol. I, 1823

- Εὐριπιδου Ἀλκηστις. Euripidis Alcestis, ex optimis exemplaribus expressa..., 1806
- Hephæstionis Alexandrini Enchiridion,1810
- Catalogus sive notitia manuscriptorum qui a cel. E. D. Clarke ..., 1812 Volume 1/2
- Lectiones Platonicae e membranis Bodleianis, 1820
- Poetae graeci minores, 5 voll., 2ª ed., Lipsia, 1816-1823: vol.I, vol.II, vol.III/ vol. I, vol.II, vol. III, vol.IV
- Iōannou Stobaiou Anthologion, 1822 vol.1, vol. 2, vol.3, vol. 4
- Notes on Herodotus, 1824 Vol. 1
- Hērodotou Halikarnēssēos Historiōn logoi IX.: Lib. I-IV - Historiarum libri IX: codicem sancrofti manuscriptum denuo contulit reliquam lectionis varietatem commodius digessit, 1824-1839 vol.1, vol. II, vol. IV
- Scholia in Sophoclis tragoedias septem. E codice MS. Laurentiano descripsit P. Elmsley, ..., 1825
- Ēphastiōnos encheiridion peri metrōn kai poiēmatōn, 1832
- Suidae Lexicon, 1834 vol.1, vol.3
- Paroemiographi graeci, 1836
- Etymologicum magnum, 1848*
- Ioannis Stobaei Eclogarum physicarum et ethicarum libri duo ad mss ..., 1850 Volume 2
- Suidae Lexicon, Graece et Latine, 1853 vol.1, vol.2

== Quotations ==
- "Nor can I do better, in conclusion, than impress upon you the study of Greek literature, which not only elevates above the vulgar herd, but leads not infrequently to positions of considerable emolument." –Th. Gaisford, Christmas Day Sermon in the Cathedral, Oxford (Rev. W. Tuckwell, Reminiscences of Oxford, 2nd ed., 1907, p. 124)
- "It was said that Gaisford, on his visit to Germany, had some difficulty in escaping from the 'umarmung' [hug, embrace] of some of its scholars, exclaiming (in the apprehension of a 'kuss' [kiss] on both cheeks) 'Ohe ! jam satis, amice'." G.V. Cox, Recollections of Oxford, London : Macmillan, 1870, p. 411, fn. 3. 'Ohe ! jam [iam] satis, amice' means idiomatically : 'Oh, that's quite enough, my friend.' The quotation derives with amendment from Abraham Cowley's Naufragium Joculare [Ioculare] ('The Hilarious Shipwreck'.), 1638, Act 1, sc. 6. (Geoffrey Thomas, Birkbeck College, University of London.)

== Notes ==
NB: The London Courier and Evening Gazette dated 13 July 1815 has the following marriage announcement:- On 'Tuesday last, at Oxford, the Rev. Thomas Gaisford, M.A. Regius Professor of Greek, and Rector of Westwell, Oxtordshire, Helen, second daughter of the late Rev. Robert Douglas
