= James Henry (poet) =

Irish scholar and poet (1798–1876)

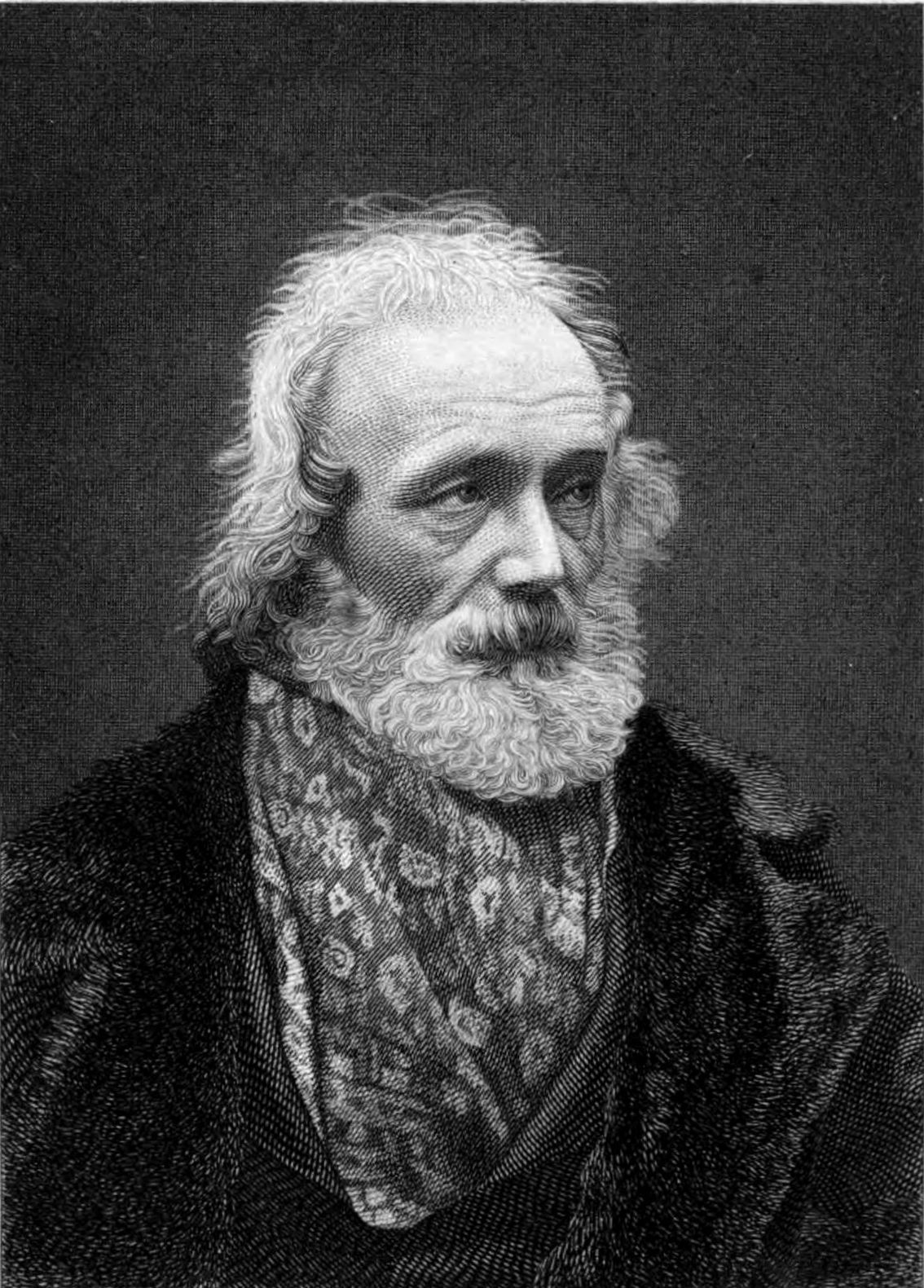
- James Henry in 1866
- Born: 13 December 1798; Dublin
- Died: 14 July 1876 (aged 77); Dalkey, County Dublin
- Resting place: Glendruid, County Dublin
- Education: Trinity College, Dublin

James Henry (13 December 1798 – 14 July 1876) was an Irish classical scholar and poet.

== Life ==
He was born in Dublin the elder son of a woollen draper, Robert Henry, and his wife Kathleen Elder. He was educated by Unitarian minister Joseph Hutton, and then at Trinity College, Dublin. At age 11 he fell in love with the poetry of Virgil and got into the habit of always carrying a copy of the Aeneid in his left breast-pocket. In Trinity he graduated with the gold medal for Classics. He then turned to medicine and until 1845 he practised as a physician in Dublin city. In spite of his unconventionality and unorthodox views on religion and his own profession, he was very successful. He married Anne Jane Patton, from Donegal, and had three daughters, only one of whom, Katherine, born 1830, survived infancy.

His accession to a large fortune in 1845 enabled him to devote himself entirely to the absorbing occupation of his life: the study of Virgil. Accompanied by his wife and daughter, he visited all those parts of Europe where he was likely to find rare editions or manuscripts of the poet.

When his wife died in Tyrol he continued his work with his daughter, who became quite a Virgil expert in her own right, and crossed the Alps seventeen times. After the death of his daughter in 1872 he returned to Dublin and continued his research at Trinity College, Dublin.

He died at Dalkey, County Dublin.

== Literary commentary ==
As a commentator on Virgil's Aeneid, Henry will always deserve to be remembered, notwithstanding the occasional eccentricity of his notes and remarks. The first fruits of his researches were published in 1853 under the quaint title Notes of a Twelve Years' Voyage of Discovery in the First Six Books of the Eneis. These Notes were followed by Henry's four-volume Aeneidea, or Critical, Exegetical, and Aesthetical Remarks on the Aeneis; Henry described his Aeneidea as "an amplification, correction, and completion" of his Notes. Only the first volume of the Aeneidea, containing his Notes on the first book of the Aeneid, was published before he died; the work was subsequently published by the trustees of his estate, under the editorial guidance of John Fletcher Davies. After the death of Davies, editorial work was completed by Arthur Palmer and Louis Claude Purser. As a textual critic Henry was exceedingly conservative. His notes, written in a lively and interesting style, are especially valuable for their wealth of illustration and references to lesser-known classical authors.

== Poetry ==
Henry was also the author of five collections of verse plus two long narrative poems describing his travels, and various pamphlets of a satirical nature.

At its best his poetry has something of the flavour of Robert Browning and Arthur Hugh Clough while at its worst it resembles the doggerel of William McGonagall. His five volumes of verse were all published at his own expense and received no critical attention either during or after his lifetime.

== Rediscovery ==
Henry was rediscovered by Christopher Ricks who included eight of his poems in the New Oxford Book of Victorian Verse (1987). Then there was silence for ten years until the Penguin Book of Victorian Verse included four of his poems. Valentine Cunningham included five of Henry's poems in The Victorians: an Anthology of Poetry and Poetics, published by Blackwell in 2000. In the 21st century, Henry was featured (with "Old Man," a poem from 1856) as one of the 90 poets included in My Own Land's Sins: An Anthology of Victorian Poetry, published by the Canadian-based publisher Universitas Press.

== Posthumous publication ==
In 2002 Christopher Ricks edited with an introduction the Selected Poems of James Henry, published by The Lilliput Press (reviewed in The New York Review of Books, The Times Literary Supplement and The Sunday Telegraph).
