= John Undershell Powell =

John Undershell Powell (4 October 1865 – 23 March 1935 in Oxford) was a British classical scholar, editor of Collectanea Alexandrina (1925), a collection of minor remains of Hellenistic poetry.

== Writings ==
- Εὐριπίδου Φοίνισσαι / The Phoenissae of Euripides. Edited with introduction and commentary. London: Constable, 1911 digitized
- (with E.A. Barber) New chapters in the history of Greek literature: Recent discoveries in Greek poetry and prose of the fourth and following centuries B.C.. Edited by J.U. Powell and E.A. Barber. Oxford: Clarendon Press, 1921 digitized
- Collectanea Alexandrina: Reliquiae minores poetarum Graecorum aetatis Ptolemaicae 323–146 A.C. epicorum, elegiacorum, lyricorum, ethicorum. Cum epimetris et indice nominum. Oxford: Clarendon Press, 1925 digitized
- (with E.A. Barber) New Chapters in the History of Greek Literature. Second Series: Some recent discoveries in Greek poetry and prose, chiefly of the fourth century B.C. and later times. Edited by J.U. Powell and E.A. Barber. Pp. 232. Oxford: Clarendon Press, 1929
- New chapters in the history of Greek literature. Third series: Some recent discoveries in Greek poetry and prose of the Classical and later periods. Oxford: Clarendon Press, 1933 digitized
