= John Becon =

English divine

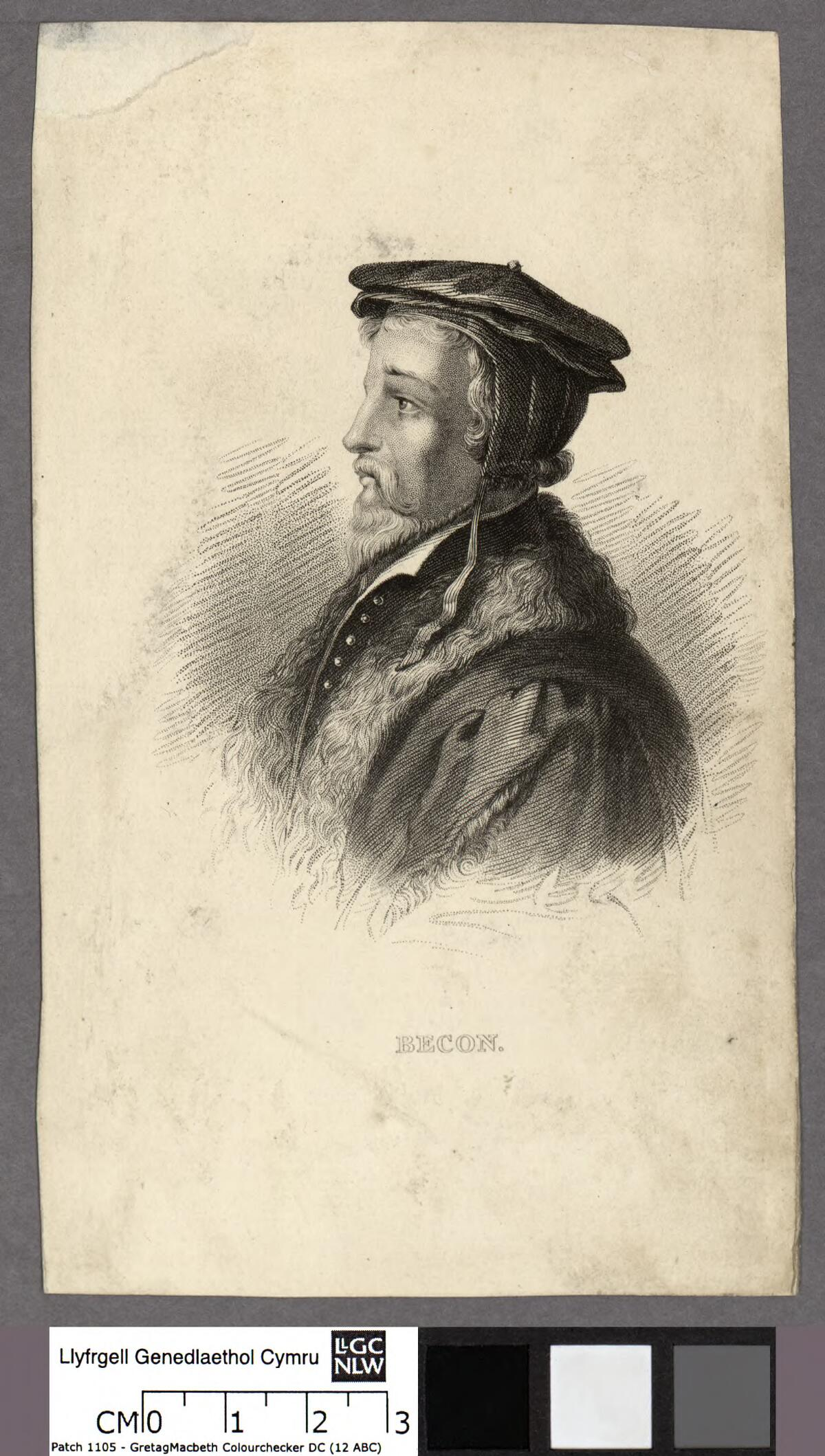
- Portrait of John Becon.
- Died: 1587

John Becon LL.D., (died 1587), was an English divine.

== Life ==
Becon, a native of Suffolk, received his education at St. John's College, Cambridge. He was admitted a scholar of that society on the Lady Margaret's foundation in 1559, proceeded B.A. in 1560–1, was admitted a fellow 21 March 1561–2, and commenced M.A. 1564. Subsequently, he became principal lecturer of the college. In July 1571 he was elected Public Orator of the university, and he served the office of proctor for the year 1571–2. While proctor he headed the opposition of the senate to the code of university statutes which had passed the great seal in 1570. Much disorder was the result, and the heads of colleges exhibited articles against him and his adherents. Ultimately the two archbishops and the bishops of London and Ely decided that the new statutes should stand, and censured the opponents for going from college to college to solicit subscriptions against the same. Becon resigned the oratorship in 1573. The following year he was installed a canon of Norwich, and in 1575 he became chancellor of that diocese. He took the degree of LL.D. in 1576.

On 16 February 1579-80 Becon was collated to the precentorship of the church of Chichester, and in 1581 was admitted to a prebend in the church of Lichfield. In 1582 a great contest took place between him and William Overton, bishop of Lichfield and Coventry, about the chancellorship of that diocese. The bishop, who had in the first instance granted it to Becon only, subsequently granted the office to him and one Babington, and to the longer liver of them. This occasioned a great disturbance and riot in the cathedral. The case came successively before the Star-chamber, the privy council, and the Archbishop of Canterbury, who remitted it to four visitors, and they finally induced the contending parties to compromise the matter. Becon was buried at St. Giles, Cripplegate, on 4 September 1587.

Various documents written by Becon in reference to the disputes in which he was engaged have been printed, and are enumerated in Cooper's "Athenæ Cantabrigienses". (Note: Addit. manuscript 5863 f. 47) (Note: Baker's Hist. of St. John's Coll. Camb., ed. Mayor) (Note: Cooper's Athenæ Cantab. ii. 16, 542) (Note: Le Neve's Fasti Eccl. Anglic., ed. Hardy, i. 266, 592, ii. 496, 498, iii. 619) (Note: Strype's Works.)

Academic offices
Preceded by William Lewin	Public Orator of the University of Cambridge; 1571–1573	Succeeded by Richard Bridgewater
