= Colin Hardie =

British classicist

- Born: 16 February 1906; Edinburgh, Scotland
- Died: 17 October 1998 (aged 92); Chichester, West Sussex, England
- Spouse: Christian (m. 1940)
- Children: 2
- Relatives: Prof William Hardie (father); W. F. R. Hardie (brother)

Academic background
- Education: Balliol College, Oxford

Academic work
- Discipline: Classics
- Sub-discipline: Ancient Rome; Latin literature; Virgil; Dante
- Institutions: Balliol College, Oxford; British School at Rome; Magdalen College, Oxford; Royal Academy of Arts

Colin Graham Hardie (16 February 1906 – 17 October 1998) was a British classicist and academic. From 1933 to 1936, he was Director of the British School at Rome. From 1936 to 1973, he was a Fellow of Magdalen College, Oxford, and a tutor in classics. In addition, from 1967 to 1973, he was the Public Orator of the University of Oxford. He was a member of the Inklings, an informal literary discussion group which included the likes of J. R. R. Tolkien and C. S. Lewis.

== Early life ==
Hardie was born on 16 February 1906 in Edinburgh, Scotland, the third son of William Ross Hardie and his wife Isabella Watt Hardie (née Stevenson). His father was a Fellow of Balliol College, Oxford, and Professor of Humanity at the University of Edinburgh. His brother, Frank, also went on to become a successful classicist. He was educated at Edinburgh Academy, a private school. He then went on to study at Balliol College, University of Oxford as a Warner Exhibitioner and Honorary Scholar. He took firsts in both Mods (1926) and Greats (1928). He won four classical prizes during his undergraduate studies; Ireland Scholar and Craven Scholar in 1925, Hertford Scholar in 1926 and the Gaisford Prize for Greek Prose in 1927. He graduated with a Bachelor of Arts (BA) in 1928, which was promoted to Master of Arts (MA) in 1931.

== Career ==
Upon graduation, Hardie was appointed to a Junior Research Fellowship in Balliol College, Oxford. He held the post from 1928 to 1929. In 1930, he was elected a Fellow and classical tutor of that college. On 1 February 1933, he was unanimously elected Director of the British School at Rome. He held the post until 1936, when he was succeeded by Ralegh Radford. He returned to England from Italy to become a Fellow of Magdalen College, Oxford, and a tutor in classics.

He took a break from his academic work during World War II. As many academics did, he lent his services to the War Office from 1941 to 1943. He then went on to work at the Admiralty's Inter-Services Topographical Department, based in Oxford, until the end of the war in 1945.

Following the war, he returned to Magdalen College. There he taught classics until his retirement in 1973. His scholarly work was largely centred on Virgil and Dante. He was a member of the Inklings, the informal literary discussion group centred on the University of Oxford. Hardie was also a part of the Socratic Club where he presented papers. For the final six years of his time at the University of Oxford, from 1967 to 1973, he was the Public Orator; a role in which he acted as the voice of the university during public occasions such as royal visits and the presentation of honorary degrees.

Photographs contributed by Hardie to the Conway Library are currently being digitised by the Courtauld Institute of Art, as part of the Courtauld Connects project.

== Later life ==
Following his retirement in 1973, Hardie and his wife moved away from Oxford to Rackham Cottage, near the village of Pulborough, Sussex. From 1971 to 1990, he was the Royal Academy's Honorary Professor of Ancient Literature.

He died in Chichester, West Sussex on 17 October 1998.

== Personal life ==
Hardie married Christian Viola Mary Lucas in 1940 who was the daughter of Perceval Lucas (brother to Edward Verrall Lucas) and Madeline Mary Eve Meynell, daughter of the writer Alice Meynell. Together they had two sons, Nicholas and Antony. He converted to Roman Catholicism in 1945.

== Selected works ==
- Hardie, Colin, ed. (1954). Vitae Vergilianae Antiquae: Vita Donati, Vita Servii, Vita Probiana, Vita Focae, S. Hieronymi Excerpta. Oxford: Clarendon Press.
- Kepler, Johannes (1966) [1611]. De nive sexangula [The six-cornered snowflake] (in Latin and English). Translated by Colin Hardie. Oxford: Clarendon Press. OCLC 974730.
