= William Hardie =

William Ross Hardie (6 January 1862 – 3 May 1916) was a Scottish classical scholar, Professor of Humanity at Edinburgh University from 1895 until his death.

== Early life ==
Hardie was born in Edinburgh in 1862, son of tailor William Purves Hardie and Agnes, née Ross, and was and educated there at Circus Place School and Edinburgh University, where he graduated with an undergraduate Master of Arts (MA hons) degree in 1880, and then at Balliol College, Oxford, where he graduated BA and later MA. In 1882 he was awarded both the Gaisford Prize for Greek Verse and the Gaisford Prize for Greek Prose, among other distinctions, and was considered the "most brilliant undergraduate classicist of his generation".

== Career ==
Elected to a fellowship at Balliol in 1884, he spent a year abroad, mostly in Greece and Italy, and returned to his college, staying there as Fellow and Tutor at Balliol from 1884 to 1895 and also serving as the university's Junior Proctor in 1893–1894.

At Balliol, he taught a form of Greek that was "simple, pronounceable, and intelligible to the ear", writing to John Stuart Blackie "I always endeavour to make the accent audible in pronouncing Greek. I quote, read, or recite Greek as much as possible, and I frequently teach composition orally, by... choosing by chance a piece of English and working out a version of it by common suggestion and discussion".

In 1895, he was appointed Professor of Humanity at Edinburgh University.

He died on 3 May 1916 after suffering a severe attack of influenza in January 1916.

== Sons ==
Hardie was the father of William Francis Ross Hardie (1902–1990) and Colin Graham Hardie (1906–1998), both also classical scholars. His elder son, W. F. R. (Frank) Hardie, was President of Corpus Christi College, Oxford, from 1950 to 1969.

== Selected publications ==
- Gaisford prize for Greek verse: Shakespeare, Twelfth Night, act II, scene 5, translated into comic iambics (Oxford : B. H. Blackwell, 1882)
- Vetera recentia: Being hints towards advanced composition in prose and verse in the form of renderings of modern words (1890)
- The Character and Genius of the Roman People: an inaugural address delivered at Edinburgh on 15 October 1895 (W. Blackwood and Sons, 1895, 29 pp.)
- The supernatural in ancient poetry and story: a lecture delivered to the Aberdeen university classical society on 15 February 1901 (J. Thin, 1901, 20 pp.)
- Lectures on classical subjects (1903)
- Latin prose composition: Comprising part I, Notes on Grammar, Style, and Idiom, part II, English passages for translation into Latin (1908)
- Silvulae academicae: Verses and Verse Translations (Oxford University Press, 1912)
- Res metrica: An introduction to the study of Greek & Roman versification (Oxford University Press, 1920, reprinted by Garland Publ., ISBN 0-8240-2970-4)
