= William Lort Mansel =

English churchman

The Right Reverend William Lort Mansel
- Bishop of Bristol
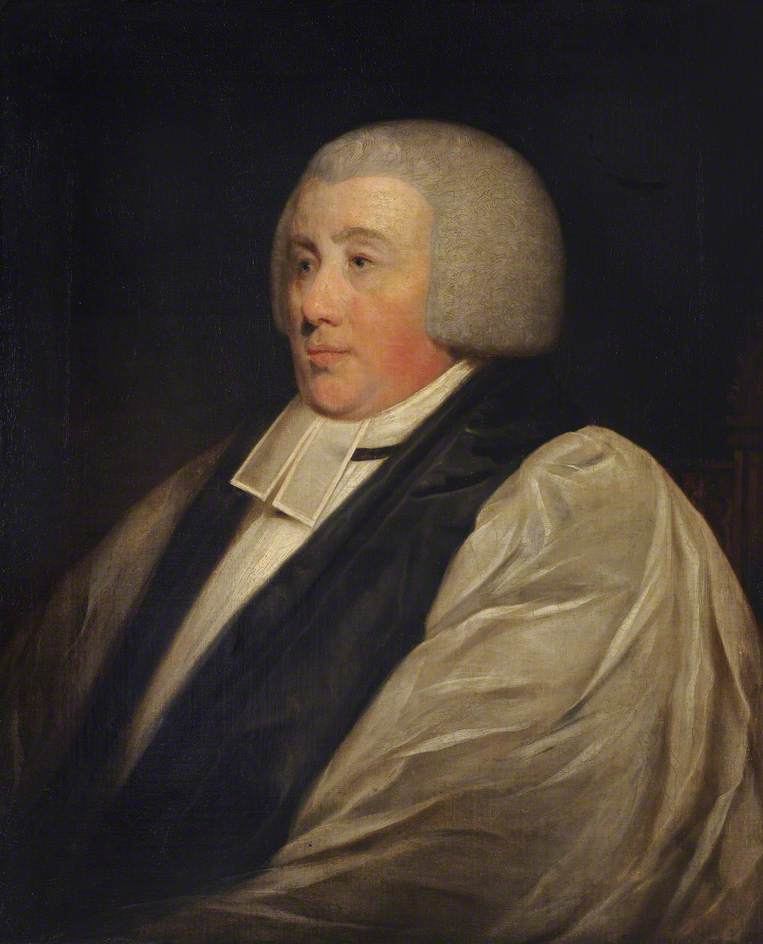
- Diocese: Diocese of Bristol
- In office: 1808–1820
- Predecessor: John Luxmoore
- Successor: John Kaye

Personal details
- Born: 2 April 1753 Pembroke, Wales
- Died: 27 June 1820 (aged 67) Trinity College, Cambridge, England
- Buried: Chapel, Trinity College, Cambridge
- Denomination: Anglican
- Education: Trinity College, Cambridge

William Lort Mansel (2 April 1753 – 27 June 1820) was an English churchman and Cambridge fellow. He was Master of Trinity College, Cambridge from 1798 to his death in 1820, and also Bishop of Bristol from 1808 to 1820.

== Life ==
He was born in Pembroke, the son of William Wogan Mansel and his wife Anne (née Lort), sister of Michael Lort, Regius Professor of Greek at Cambridge. He was educated at the King's School, Gloucester under Edward Sparkes, and at Trinity College, Cambridge (matriculated 1770, scholarship 1771, graduated B.A. 1774, M.A. 1777, D.D. 1798).

Elected a fellow of Trinity in 1775, Mansel was ordained deacon in 1780 and priest in 1783. He became Vicar of Bottisham 1783–1790, Vicar of Chesterton in 1788 and Rector of Fowlmere in 1789.

Mansel was known as a wit, writer of epigrams, and satirist of academic rivalries. His popularity led to his election as Public Orator of Cambridge, 1788–1798. Appointed Master of Trinity in 1798, Mansel served as University Vice-Chancellor 1799–1800. Appointed Bishop of Bristol in 1808 on the recommendation of his former pupil Spencer Perceval, the then Chancellor of the Exchequer, he combined the bishopric with his mastership until his death in 1820.

Lord Byron, who was a student at Trinity from 1805 to 1808, described Mansel ("Magnus", for his corpulence) presiding in college:

High in the midst, surrounded by his peers,
Magnus his ample front sublime uprears:
Plac'd on his chair of state, he seems a God,
While Sophs and Freshmen tremble at his nod;
As all around sit wrapt in speechless gloom,
His voice, in thunder, shakes the sounding dome;
Denouncing dire reproach to luckless fools,
Unskill'd to plod in mathematic rules.

— Lord Byron, Thoughts Suggested by a College Examination

Mansel died in the Master's Lodge at Trinity College, Cambridge, and is interred in the College Chapel.

== Family ==
Mansel married in 1779 Isabella Haggerston(e), daughter of John Haggerston, a Cambridge attorney. They had 13 children:

- Isabella Mansel (1789–1866), married the Rev. Lort Mansel, a cousin.
- William Lort Mansel (1790–1810), lieutenant in the Navy, died at sea.
- Anne Mansel (1792–1832), married in 1819 Edward Peacock, Fellow of Trinity and cleric.
- Elizabeth Mansel (1793–1880), married in 1823 James Devereux Hustler, Fellow of Trinity and cleric.
- Frederick Mansel (1794)
- Edward Mansel (1794) – Frederick and Edward, twins, both died in infancy.
- William Frederick Mansel (1795–1839), godson of Prince William Frederick, priest.
- Spencer Perceval Mansel (1797–1862), godson of Spencer Perceval, priest.
- Fanny Mansel (1798–1878), married in 1821 the Rev. Thomas Tayler of Whitlings.
- Emily Mansel (1800–1874), married in 1823 the Rev. Edward Miller.
- Sophia Matilda Caroline Mansel (1801–1873), married in 1823 the Rev. John Horsley Dakins.
- Catherine Mansel (1803)
- Mary Mansel (1803) – Catherine and Mary, twins, both died in infancy.

On Mansel's death, his executors were Edward Daniel Clarke and James Devereux Hustler; his estate was left in will to his five unmarried daughters.

Academic offices
Preceded by William Pearce	Cambridge University Orator; 1788–1798	Succeeded by Edmund Outram
Preceded by Thomas Postlethwaite	Master of Trinity College, Cambridge; 1798–1820	Succeeded by Christopher Wordsworth
Church of England titles
Preceded by John Luxmoore	Bishop of Bristol; 1808–1820	Succeeded by John Kaye
