= Arthur Palmer (priest) =

Arthur Palmer (1807–1881) was an Anglican priest in the nineteenth century.

Palmer was educated at Trinity College, Dublin. He was Rector of Guelph for 43 years and the first Archdeacon of Toronto.

His son, also called Arthur Palmer, was a classical scholar.
