= William Barford =

English scholar and Anglican clergyman

William Barford (died November 1792) was an English scholar and Anglican clergyman.

== Life ==
Barford was educated at Eton College, and elected to King's College, Cambridge in 1737. He received his B.A. in 1742, M.A. in 1746, and D.D. in 1771. He became tutor of his college, was three times moderator in the Sophs' school, and was proctor in 1761. From 1762 to 1768 he was Public Orator; he resigned the post to stand for the Greek professorship, which he failed to obtain. In 1768, his college presented him with the living of Fordingbridge, in Hampshire. The following year he was appointed Chaplain to the Speaker of the House of Commons by Sir John Cust, the then speaker, but held the office for only one session. The next Speaker appointed another chaplain, and Barford's friends feared he would not receive the usual preferment conferred on holders of the office; it was resolved in May 1770 that the king be asked to confer a position upon him, and consequently, the following month he was installed as a prebendary of Canterbury. In 1773 he resigned Fordingbridge for the rectory of Kimpton, Hertfordshire, which he held along with the living of Allhallows, Lombard Street, until his death in November 1792. He married in 1764.

Jacob Bryant pays tribute to Barford's "zeal", "assistance" and "judicious remarks" in the preface to the third volume of his New System of Mythology. In the life of Bryant, prefixed to the six-volume edition of the New System, Barford is put first in the list of his friends.

== Works ==
A Latin dissertation of Barford's on the "First Pythian" is published in Henry Huntingford's edition of Pindar's works, along with a short life of the author, a list of his works, and praise for his learning. The list consists of poems on various political events in Latin and Greek, written in his capacity of public orator; a Latin oration at the funeral of William George, provost of King's College, in 1756; and a Concio ad Clerum, 1784, written after his installation as canon of Canterbury.

Academic offices
Preceded by John Skynner	Cambridge University Orator; 1762–1768	Succeeded by Richard Beadon
