= Sarah Purser =

Irish artist

Sarah Purser RHA
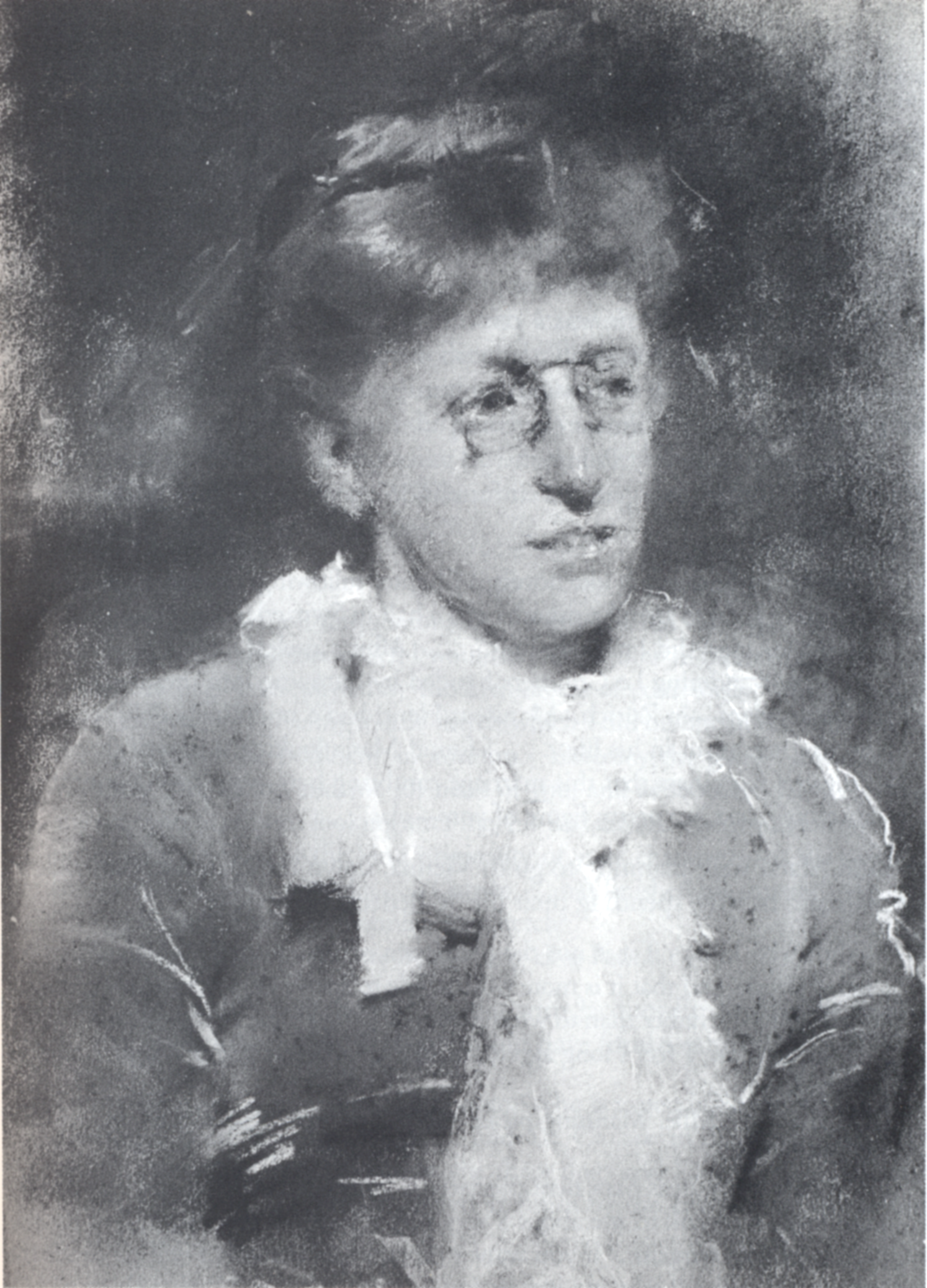
- Portrait by Walter Osborne, 1887
- Born: Sarah Henrietta Purser; 22 March 1848; County Dublin, Ireland
- Died: 7 August 1943 (aged 95); Dublin, Ireland
- Resting place: Mount Jerome Cemetery, Dublin, Ireland
- Education: Metropolitan School of Art, Académie Julian
- Known for: First female member of the Royal Hibernian Academy
- Movement: stained glass movement

Sarah Henrietta Purser RHA (22 March 1848 – 7 August 1943) was an Irish artist mainly noted for her portraiture. She was the first woman to become a full member of the Royal Hibernian Academy. She also founded and financially supported An Túr Gloine, a stained glass studio.

== Biography ==
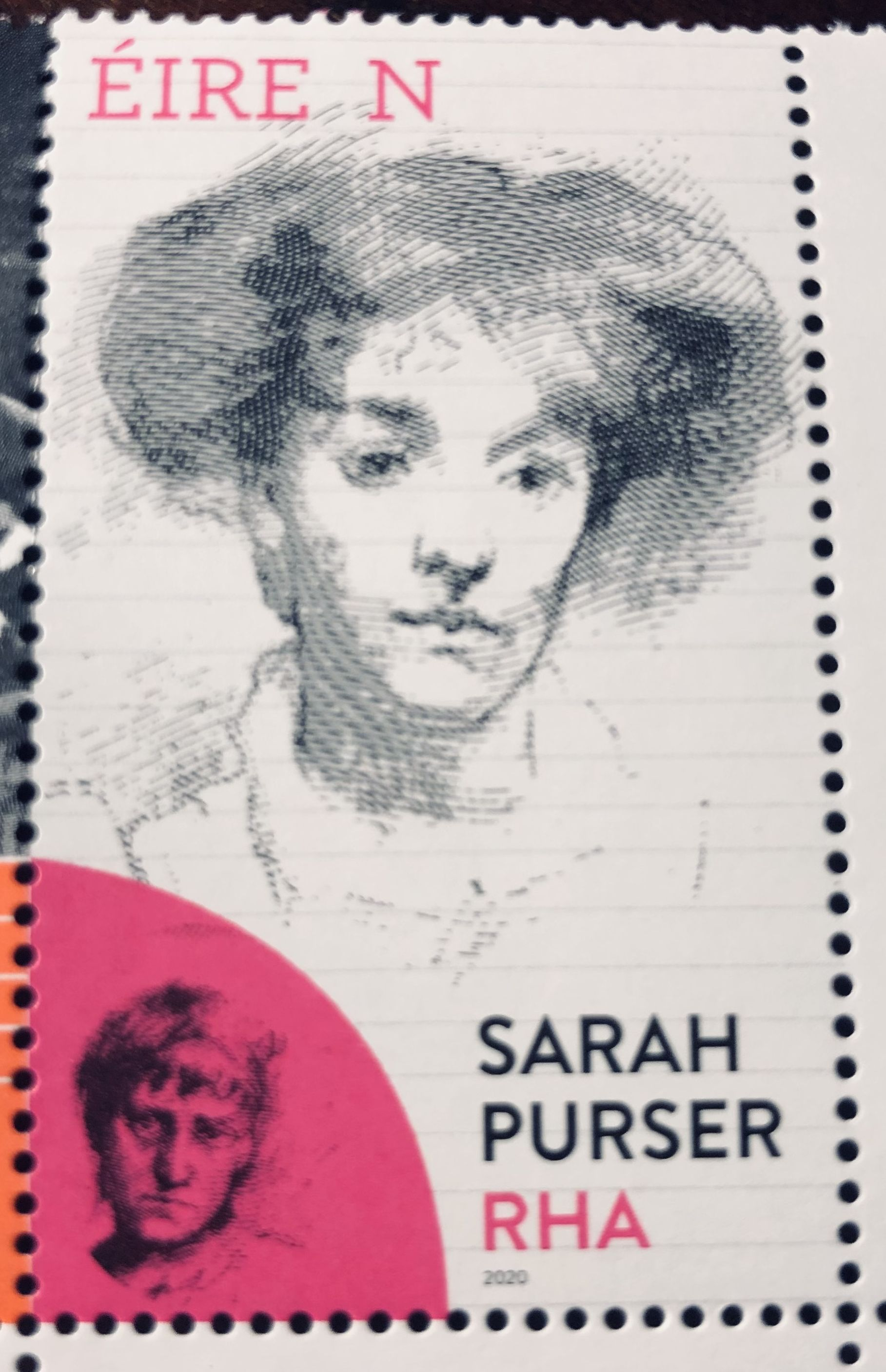
Sarah Purser Commemorative Stamp 2020

Purser was born in Kingstown (now Dún Laoghaire) in County Dublin, and raised in Dungarvan, County Waterford. She was one of the numerous children of Benjamin Purser, a prosperous flour miller and brewer, and his wife Anne Mallet. She was related to Sir Frederic W. Burton, who was a son of Hannah Mallet. The Purser family had come to Ireland from Gloucestershire in the eighteenth century. Two of her brothers, John and Louis, became professors at Trinity College Dublin. Her niece, Olive Purser, daughter of her brother Alfred, was the first woman scholar in TCD.

Purser lived for many years in Mespil House, a Georgian mansion with beautiful plaster ceilings on Mespil Road, on the banks of the Grand Canal. Here she was "at home" every Tuesday afternoon to Dublin's writers and artists; her afternoon parties were a fixture of Dublin literary life. Mespil House was demolished after she died, and its footprint developed into apartments. She died in 1943 at the age of 95 and was buried in Mount Jerome Cemetery beside her brothers, John and Louis.

== Education ==
At thirteen, she attended the Moravian school, Institution Evangélique de Montmirail, Switzerland, where she learnt to speak fluent French and began painting. In 1873, her father's business failed, and she decided to become a full-time painter. She attended classes at the Dublin Metropolitan School of Art. She joined the Dublin Sketching Club, where she was later appointed an honorary member. In 1874, she distinguished herself in the National Competition. In 1878, she again contributed to the RHA, and for the next fifty years became a regular exhibitor, mainly of portraits, and showed an average of three works per show.

From 1878 to 1879, she studied at the Académie Julian in Paris where she met the German painter Louise Catherine Breslau, with whom she became a lifelong friend.

== Career ==
Sarah Purser became wealthy through astute investments, particularly in Guinness, for which several of her male relatives had worked over the years. She was very active in the art world in Dublin and was involved in the setting up of the Hugh Lane Municipal Gallery, persuading the Irish government to provide Charlemont House in Parnell Square to house the gallery.

She had a studio at 11 Harcourt Terrace where she lived from 1887 to 1909.

She was the second woman to sit on the Board of Governors and Guardians, National Gallery of Ireland, 1914–1943.

She was made an Honorary Member of the Royal Hibernian Academy in 1890; the first female Associate Member in 1923, and the first female Member in 1924. In 1924, she initiated the movement for the launching of the Friends of the National Collection of Ireland.

== Portraiture ==
She worked mostly as a portraitist. Through her talent and energy, and owing to her friendship with the Gore-Booths, she was very successful in obtaining commissions, famously commenting

"I went through the British aristocracy like the measles."

When the Viceroy of Ireland commissioned her to portray his children in 1888 his choice reflected her position as the country's foremost portraitist.

In 1977, Bruce Arnold noted

"some of her finest and most sensitive work was not strictly portraiture, for example, An Irish Idyll in the Ulster Museum, and Le Petit Déjeuner (in the National Gallery of Ireland)."

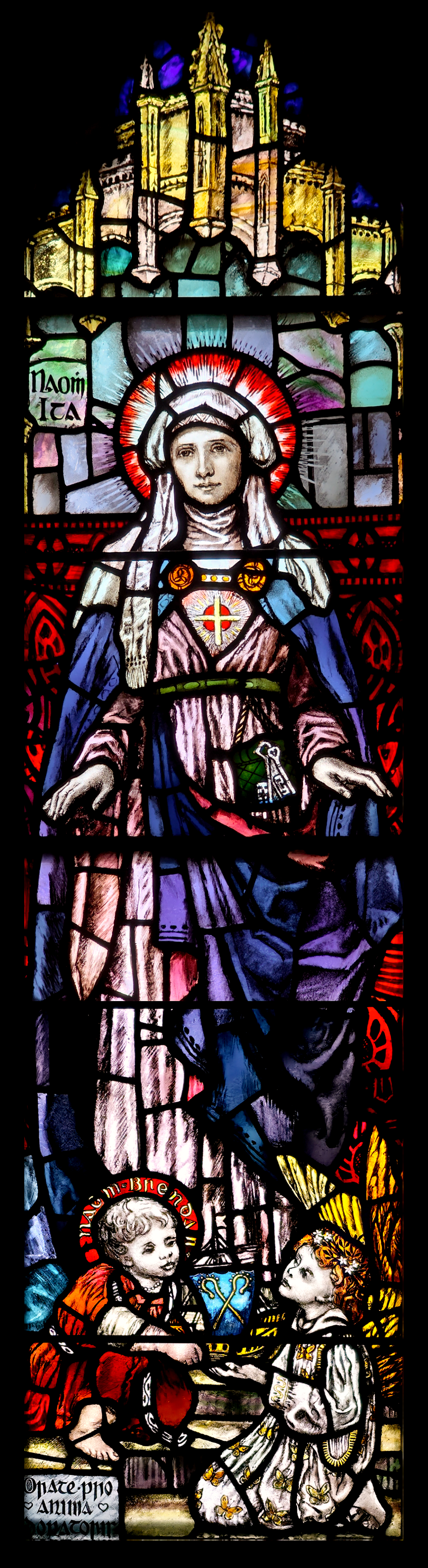
The St. Ita Window by Sarah Purser and Catherine O'Brien

== Glass (An Túr Gloine) ==
Sarah Purser financed An Túr Gloine (The Tower of Glass), a stained glass cooperative, at 24 Upper Pembroke and ran it from its inauguration in 1903 until her retirement in 1940. Michael Healy was the first of a number of distinguished recruits, such as Catherine O'Brien, Evie Hone, Wilhelmina Geddes, Beatrice Elvery, Ethel Rhind, or the Belgian painter Marthe Donas. Purser was determined the stained glass workshop should adhere to true Arts and Crafts philosophy: 'Each window is the work of one artist who makes the sketch and cartoon and selects and paints every morsel of glass him or herself'.

Purser did not produce many items of stained glass herself. Most of the stained glass works were painted by other members of the cooperative, presumably under her direction. Two early works, 1904, were St. Ita for St. Brendan's Cathedral, Loughrea and The Good Shepherd for St. Columba's College, Dublin. Her last stained glass work is thought to be The Good Shepherd and the Good Samaritan, 1926, for the Church of Ireland at Killucan, County Westmeath.

== Legacy ==
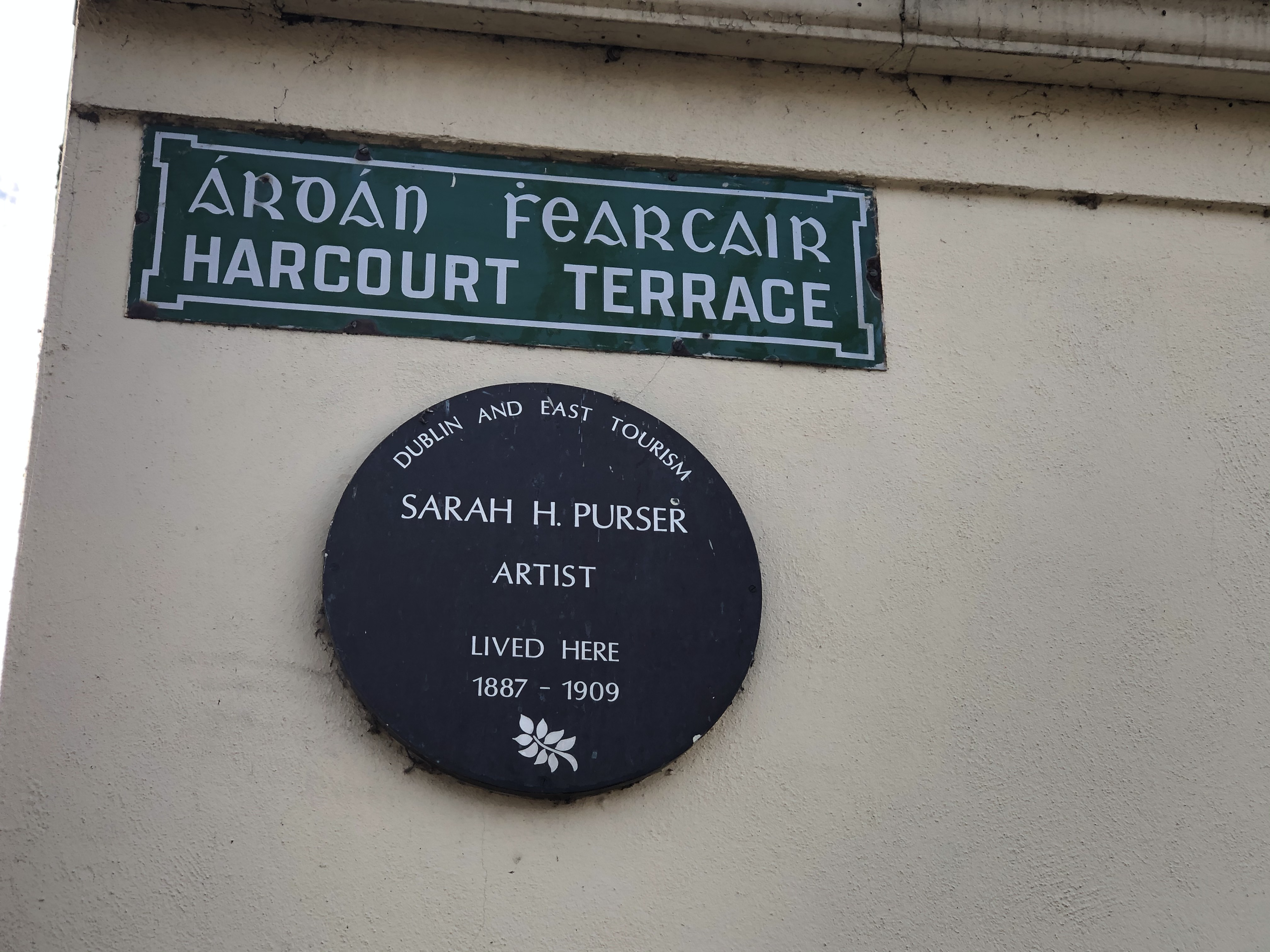
Plaque at Sarah Purser's Studio, 11 Harcourt Terrace

Purser is commemorated by a plaque on Harcourt Terrace. An Post issued a commemorative stamp for her as part of a series on "Pioneering Women" in 2020.

Various portraits painted by Purser are held in the National Gallery of Ireland, the Ulster Museum and the Hugh Lane Gallery.

Archives relating to Sarah Purser are housed in the Centre for the Study of Irish Art, National Gallery of Ireland and in the National Library of Ireland. An Túr Gloine archive is held in the Centre for the Study of Irish Art, National Gallery of Ireland.

An exhibition of Purser's work was held at Dublin's Municipal Gallery of Modern Art (now Hugh Lane Gallery) in 1974 to mark the 50th anniversary of the founding of the FNCI. The National Gallery of Ireland mounted ‘Sarah Purser: Private Worlds’ in 2023-4, and Hugh Lane Gallery exhibited ‘More Power to You: Sarah Purser – A Force for Irish Art’ from 10 July 2024 to 5 January 2025.

== See also ==
- List of Irish artists

== Notes ==
- Sarah Purser at the Princess Grace Irish Library
- Bruce Arnold (1977). Irish art: a concise history (2 ed.) London: Thames and Hudson. ISBN 0-500-20148-X.
- John O'Grady (1996). The Life and Work of Sarah Purser Four Courts Press. ISBN 1-85182-241-0.
