= William Pearce (priest) =

English clergyman and academic

William Pearce (1744–1820) was an English clergyman and academic, Master of Jesus College, Cambridge from 1789 and Dean of Ely from 1797.

== Life ==
Pearce was born on 3 December 1744 and educated at St John's College, Cambridge. He was Public Orator of Cambridge from 1778 to 1788; and Master of the Temple from 1787 to 1798. In 1788 he was elected Fellow of the Royal Society.

Pearce was Master of Jesus College, Cambridge from 1789 until his death. He was also Dean of Ely from 1797 until his death.

He died on 14 November 1820.

Academic offices
Preceded by Richard Beadon	Cambridge University Orator; 1778–1788	Succeeded by William Lort Mansel
Church of England titles
Preceded by William Cooke	Dean of Ely; 1797 – 1820	Succeeded by James Wood
