= Thomas Byng =

English academic & lawyer (??–1599)

Thomas Byng (or Bynge) (died 1599) was an English academic and lawyer, Master of Clare Hall, Cambridge from 1571.

== Life ==
He matriculated as a sizar at Peterhouse in May 1552, and proceeded B.A. in 1556. He was admitted fellow of his college 7 February 1558, and commenced M.A. 1559, and LL.D. 1570. In 1564, when Queen Elizabeth visited Cambridge, Byng made a Latin oration in her presence on the excellence of a monarchical government. He was proctor in the same year, and on 2 March 1565 became public orator.

Byng became Master of Clare Hall, Cambridge, 1571, vice-chancellor of the university 1572, a member of the college of civilians 21 April 1572, and regius professor of the civil law at Cambridge 18 March 1573-4. He became dean of arches 24 July 1595. On 27 July 1578, with other dignitaries of the university, he visited the queen at Audley, and for a second time read a Latin oration in her presence. He died in December 1599, and was buried 23 December at Hackney Church, Middlesex. By his wife, Catherine (1553–1627), he had ten sons and two daughters.

Besides writing orations, Byng edited Nicholas Carr's translations from Demosthenes (1571). He contributed Latin and Greek verses to Thomas Wilson's translation of Demosthenes (1570), and to the university collections issued on the restoration of Martin Bucer and Paul Fagius (1560), and on the death of Sir Philip Sidney (1587).

== Notes ==
Academic offices
Preceded by William Masters	Cambridge University Orator; 1565–1570	Succeeded by William Lewin
