= James Devereux Hustler =

English cleric and academic

James Devereux Hustler (1784–1849) was an English cleric and academic. He was a mathematician, elected a Fellow of the Royal Society in 1819.

== Early life ==
He was the son of Thomas and Ann Hustler of Bury St Edmunds; his father (died 1800) was a grocer in Abbeygate Street. William Hustler (died 1832), registrar of the University of Cambridge, and Robert Samuel Hustler (died 1835) of the Royal Engineers, who served at the Battle of Waterloo as a captain, were his brothers. He was educated at the King Edward VI Free School, Bury St Edmunds, under the Rev. Michael Becher. Charles Blomfield, who shared his background and education, and became Bishop of London, was a good friend.

Hustler matriculated at Christ's College, Cambridge in 1801, moving to Trinity College in 1802. He was third Wrangler in 1806, after Frederick Pollock and Henry Walter, graduating B.A. He became a Fellow of Trinity in 1807. That year, a five-hour interview between Thomas Smart Hughes, then an undergraduate, and an increasingly drunken Richard Porson, a close friend of Hustler's, took place in Hustler's college rooms.

In 1809 Hustler graduated M.A., and he graduated B.D. in 1816. Henry Gage, 4th Viscount Gage entered Trinity College in 1811, and graduated M.A. in 1812; he went on to write some mathematical works. Hustler was appointed his domestic chaplain in 1813. In 1813, also, Hustler became tutor to Spencer Perceval the younger.

== Trinity tutor ==
Hustler was an assistant tutor at Trinity 1811–1813, and then tutor 1813–1823. His period as a tutor overlapped with the years 1815–1825 that have been dubbed the "analytical revolution" at Cambridge. In the teaching and examining of the infinitesimal calculus, the notations and ideas of Gottfried Leibniz were introduced, alongside those traditionally taught of Isaac Newton.

As a tutor, Hustler diverted George Airy away from applying to Peterhouse, which had been recommended by Thomas Clarkson, a friend of Hustler's, and taught him at Trinity. Airy had been taught by a master at his school in Colchester, Thomas Rogers (1789–1860), a graduate from Sidney Sussex College in 1811, covering the university topics to fluxions and the Principia. Hustler and his tutorial assistant George Peacock were in 1819 passed work by Airy. In 1820, Hustler arranged an exhibition (minor scholarship) for Airy, via the Norwich Member of Parliament William Smith.

Peacock then gave Airy special teaching in the contemporary calculus methods, and Airy responded by working over results of Samuel Vince and Robert Woodhouse. When Airy began experimenting with the Argand diagram in 1820, Peacock encouraged him in linking it to trigonometry, but Hustler disapproved.

In 1822, Hustler intervened to place Airy and some of his peers, ahead of the usual schedule, in the "questionist" group of those being prepared for the final stage of the Mathematical Tripos. There was resistance from the more senior students. The accelerated group was then taught separately, by Peacock.

== Later life ==
Hustler's clerical career began in 1823, when he was a curate at Fornham All Saints. In 1828 the Duke of Grafton presented him to the rectory of Great Fakenham, and in 1829 to the living of Euston, Suffolk.

As a benefactor, Hustler gave a paten to Fornham All Saints, and an organ to St John's Church, Bury St Edmunds, built 1840–1.

== Works ==
- The Elements of Conic Sections: with the sections of conoids (1st edition 1818, 2nd edition 1820, 3rd edition 1826), anonymous. A revised edition of 1845 was published under Hustler's name.
- A Sermon preached [...] the first Sunday after the funeral of [...] George Henry Duke of Grafton (1844)
- Unity in the Church: A Sermon Preached at Ixworth on Monday, May 21st, 1849 (1849)

== Family ==
Hustler married Elizabeth Mansel, daughter of William Lort Mansel, in 1823. Of their children:

- James Devereux Hustler, the eldest son, married in 1852 Isabella Carruthers, eldest daughter of George Edwardes Carruthers, a surgeon, and Anne Smith, daughter of Sir David William Smith, 1st Baronet.
- Spencer William Hustler, married in 1854 Anne Leach, eldest daughter of the Rev. Francis George Leach of Stackpole.
- Elizabeth Juliana, married in 1855 James Robertson Bryant of Pembroke as his second wife.
- Augusta Frederica, the youngest daughter, married in 1856 the Rev. Owen Jones. In 1888 their daughter Elizabeth Frederica Isabella Owen married the Rev. William Howard Coates, son of William Henry Coates and his wife Elizabeth Youatt.

Portraits of their children were painted in 1833 by Samuel Lane.
