= William Lewin (died 1598) =

Member of the Parliament of England

- Died: 15 April 1598
- Buried: St Leonard, Shoreditch
- Spouse: Anne Goldsmith
- Issue: Thomas Lewin; Justinian Lewin; John Lewin; Anne Lewin; Catherine Lewin; Judith Lewin four other children
- Father: Edmund Lewin
- Mother: Juliana Goche or Googe

William Lewin or Lewyn (died 15 April 1598) of London and Otterden, Kent, was a college fellow, tutor, ecclesiastical lawyer, and judge. He also served three times as a member of parliament for Rochester.

== Biography ==
William Lewin, said to have been of 'humble origin', was one of the five children of Edmund Lewin (son of John Lewin of Cuffley, Hertfordshire) by Juliana Goche, the daughter of William Goche of Good Easter, Feodary of Essex.

He matriculated as a pensioner at Christ's College, Cambridge, in November 1559, graduated B.A. in March 1562, M.A. in 1565, and Doctor of Laws in 1576. He was a Fellow of his college from 1562 to 1571, University Proctor for part of 1568, and Public Orator of the University in 1570/71. When the Queen visited Cambridge in 1564, Lewin was chosen to address her. Lewin's cousin Elizabeth had formerly been the Queen's nurse, and his cousin Thomas Lewin had also been in the Queen's service; however according to Houlbrooke, Lewin's advancement at Cambridge was 'most directly assisted' by William Cecil, 1st Baron Burghley, the university's Chancellor, to whose elder daughter, Anne Cecil, he is thought to have been tutor.

In 1576, Lewin was appointed a Judge of the Prerogative Court of Canterbury, a position he held until his death. He became Chancellor of the Diocese of Rochester in 1586 and was Prebendary of Chichester and of St Asaph, from 1587. He was also a Master in Chancery from 1593 to 1598. Lewin was a member of parliament for Rochester in Kent, in 1586, 1589 and 1593.

Lewin married Anne Goldsmith, the daughter of Francis Goldsmith of Crayford, Kent, a lady celebrated for her beauty and virtues in Gabriel Harvey's dedication of Ciceronianus to her husband, by whom he had at least ten children, including three sons, Thomas, Justinian (1586 – 28 June 1620), and John, and three daughters: Anne (d.1645), who married Sir Lawrence Washington (1579–1643) of Garsdon, Wiltshire, Registrar of the Court of Chancery, by whom she was the mother of Lawrence Washington (1622–62); Catherine, who married James Paget of Northamptonshire; and Judith (1590–1625), who married Sir John Isham of Lamport Hall, near Northampton.

Lewin's heir was his second son, Justinian (1586 – 28 June 1620), who was a lawyer and a Gentleman of the Privy Chamber to James I, and married, on 14 May 1607, Elizabeth Capel, the daughter of Arthur Capel of Little Hadham, Hertfordshire.

He died on 15 April 1598, and was buried in St Leonard's, Shoreditch. There is also a monumental inscription to him at Otterden, Kent.

== Notes ==
Academic offices
Preceded by Thomas Bynge	Cambridge University Orator; 1570–1571	Succeeded by John Becon
