= Frederick Beadon =

Frederick Beadon (6 December 1777 – 10 June 1879) was canon of Wells, Somerset, England. Beadon, third son of the Rev. Edward Beadon, rector of North Stoneham, was born in London on 6 December 1777.

== Early life and education ==
He was educated at Charterhouse and at Trinity College, Oxford. He took orders in 1801, and was shortly afterwards presented by his uncle, Richard Beadon, Bishop of Bath and Wells, to the living of Weston-super-Mare. He exchanged this benefice for the vicarage of Titley, and, in 1811, was presented to the rectory of North Stoneham in succession to his father. He held the prebend of Compton Bishop from 26 May 1809 until his death seventy years later.

In 1812 he was made a canon residentiary of Wells, and kept residence there each year, without interruption, until 1875. He was also chancellor of Wells Cathedral from 1825 until his death.

== Family & personal life ==
In 1803 he married Marianne, daughter of the Rev. Dr. Wilder, of Purley Hall, by whom he had one son and two daughters.

Canon Beadon came of a family distinguished for its longevity. He was of middle stature, of strongly built frame, and of great muscular power, which he retained even in extreme old age. There was nothing particular in his diet or habits, save that he ate pastry and fruit more freely than meat. He drank wine in moderation. His temper was equable and cheerful. Shooting, fishing, and gardening were his favourite pursuits. He took out a shooting-license as late as 1872, and when engaged in sport seemed almost incapable of fatigue. At the same time he was never unmindful of his calling, and fulfilled its duties diligently, taking some part in the public service of the church up to his 96th year.

== Work and politics ==
During his residences at Wells he was active in capitular business, especially in promoting the repair of the cathedral church and the efficiency of its services. He took no part in ecclesiastical conflicts, and adhered to the practices and opinions prevalent among the clergy in his early years.

He was the last of the non-resident freemen of Southampton whose privileges were reserved by the Reform Bill. In political as well as in ecclesiastical matters he was a strict Conservative. Once only, in 1828, does it seem that he travelled in Europe, and he was never thoroughly reconciled to the innovation of railways.

On his attaining his 100th year, Queen Victoria caused a message conveying congratulations and good wishes to be telegraphed to him, and shortly afterwards sent him her photograph with her autograph signature. To most of the letters which he received on this occasion Canon Beadon sent immediate replies, written in his own hand.

== Death ==
In the autumn of 1878 he had a severe attack of bronchitis, and from that time was confined to his room. He continued, however, to take a lively interest in the management of his farm, and in hearing of the success of younger sportsmen. During the early part of 1879 he gradually lost strength, and died very quietly on 10 June of that year, aged 101.
