= Cyril Bailey =

British author, fellow, tutor and librarian at Balliol College, Oxford (1871–1957)

Bailey in 1945.

Cyril Bailey, CBE, FBA (13 April 1871 – 5 December 1957) was an English classicist. He was a fellow and tutor at Balliol College, Oxford, from 1902 to 1939.

== Early life ==
He was born on 13 April 1871 to Alfred Bailey, a barrister and legal scholar, and his wife Fanny Margaret, née Coles, a merchant's daughter. His godfather (and cousin) was the banker and classical scholar Sir Walter Leaf. Cyril attended St Paul's School in London, before studying classics at Balliol College, Oxford (1890–94); he won the Craven and Hertford scholarships.

== Academic career and honours ==
After graduating with a first-class degree, Bailey was elected a fellow and tutor at Exeter College, Oxford, in 1894. He left there in 1902, when he returned to Balliol as a fellow. He remained there for thirty seven years before retiring in 1939. A popular classics tutor and highly regarded lecturer, Bailey was a prominent figure in the life of his college. He epitomised a type of scholar, "of first-rate ability and international reputation who preferred not to seek promotion, titles, or even relief from the duties of teaching, and who were content with the position of tutor at an Oxford college, lavishing much of their time and energy on their pupils."

Bailey also served as the Public Orator for the University of Oxford between 1932 and 1939, chairman of the council of Lady Margaret Hall, Oxford, from 1921 to 1939, and as a delegate of Oxford University Press from 1921 to 1946, in the latter role being involved in the production of the Oxford Latin Dictionary which was published in 1968. His own research focused on the classical philosophers Lucretius and Epicurus.

Alongside receiving five honorary doctorates, Bailey gave the Sather Lectures at the University of California in 1932 and was elected a fellow of the British Academy the next year. He was appointed a Commander of the Order of the British Empire in 1939 for his work as chairman of the Oxford Youth Advisory Committee. He died on 5 December 1957 and was survived by his wife, Gemma (daughter of the historian and bishop Mandell Creighton), who had attended the University of Oxford herself, and produced a history of Lady Margaret Hall in 1923. They had four children. Their eldest daughter was Mary Creighton Bailey. (Note: Mary Creighton Bailey (19 September 1913 – 16 August 2008). GRO index: Births Sep 1913 Bailey Mary. Mother Creighton. Headington 3a 2134. Her birth certificate says: Headington, County of Oxford. Birth nineteenth September 1913. 7 (or 1) Banbury Road, St Giles, Oxford. Mary, daughter of Cyril Bailey and Gemma Bailey formerly Creighton. Father: fellow of Balliol Cellege. Informant: Cyril Bailey, father, 7 (or 1) Banbury Road, Oxford.) Their third child, Rachel Moss (with her husband the Very Rev. Basil Moss), played an important role in liberalising Church of England views on sexuality; she edited God's Yes to Sexuality (1981).

== Selected works ==
- Lvcreti de Rervm Natvra Libri Sex, Oxford Classical Texts (Oxford: Clarendon Press, 1900; 2nd ed., 1922).
- The Religion of Ancient Rome (London: A. Constable & Co, 1907).
- Lucretius on the Nature of Things (Oxford: Clarendon Press, 1910).
- P. Ovidi Nasonis Fastorum Liber III (Oxford: Clarendon Press, 1921).
- The Clouds of Aristophanes, Clarendon Series of Latin and Greek Authors (Oxford: Clarendon Press, 1921).
- The Legacy of Rome (Oxford: Clarendon Press, 1923).
- Epicurus: The Extant Remains (Oxford: Clarendon Press, 1926).
- (editor) Mind of Rome (Oxford: Clarendon Press, 1926).
- The Greek Atomists and Epicurus (Oxford: Clarendon Press, 1928).
- Phases in the Religion of Ancient Rome (Oxford: Oxford University Press, 1932).
- Religion in Virgil (Oxford: Clarendon Press, 1935).
- Francis Fortescue Urquhart: A Memoir (London: Macmillan and Co., 1936).
- De Rerum Natura Libri Sex, 3 vols. (Oxford: Clarendon Press, 1947).
- Hugh Percy Allen (London: Oxford University Press, 1948).
- Lucretius (London: Geoffrey Cumberlege, 1949).
- A Short History of the Balliol Boys' Club, 1907–1950 (Oxford: Oxford University Press, 1950).
