= Louis Claude Purser =

Irish classical scholar (1854–1932)

- Born: September 28, 1854
- Died: March 20, 1932 (aged 77)
- Occupation: Translator

Academic background
- Education: Midleton College

Louis Claude Purser, FBA (28 September 1854 in Abbeyside – 20 March 1932 in Dublin) was an Irish classical scholar.

Purser was educated at Midleton College, County Cork, and Portora Royal School, Enniskillen, where a fellow pupil and student of classics was Oscar Wilde.

Purser was a tutor at Trinity College, Dublin, from 1881 to 1898. In 1897, he was appointed as Professor of Latin there. He collaborated with Dr. Robert Yelverton Tyrrell on the translation of the letters of Cicero.

Purser and Arthur Palmer completed the editorial work for the final volumes of James Henry’s Aeneidea, a detailed commentary on Virgil’s Aeneid, after the death of John Fletcher Davies, the editor originally appointed by Henry’s trustees.

He was the brother of the Irish artist Sarah Purser. His niece Olive Purser was the first woman scholar in TCD. He is buried at Mount Jerome Cemetery.
