= Eric Arthur Barber =

Barber in 1947.

Eric Arthur Barber, FBA (8 October 1888; 24 May 1965) was an Oxford college head.

Barber was educated at Shrewsbury School and New College, Oxford. During World War I he served as an officer with the King's Shropshire Light Infantry. A classicist, he was a Fellow of Merton College, Oxford, from 1910 to 1913. He was Fellow, Tutor and Lecturer in Classics at Exeter College, Oxford, from 1913 to 1943; and Rector of Exeter College, Oxford, from 1943 to 1956.

Academic offices
Preceded by Robert Ranulph Marett	Rector of Exeter College, Oxford; 1943–1956	Succeeded by Kenneth Wheare
