= Richard Beadon =

Bishop of Bath and Wells from 1802 to 1824

The Right Reverend Richard Beadon
- Bishop of Bath and Wells
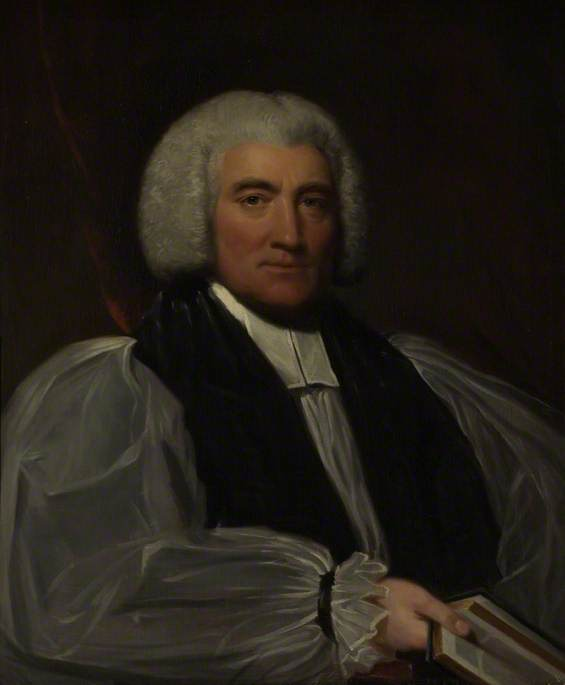
- Richard Beadon by Lemuel Francis Abbott
- Diocese: Diocese of Bath and Wells
- In office: 1802–1824
- Predecessor: Charles Moss
- Successor: George Henry Law
- Other post: Bishop of Gloucester (1789–1802)

Orders
- Ordination: 31 May 1761 by Samuel Squire
- Consecration: 7 June 1789 by John Moore

Personal details
- Born: 15 April 1737
- Died: 21 April 1824 (aged 87)
- Denomination: Anglican
- Parents: Robert Beadon and Mary Beadon née Squire
- Spouse: Rachel Beadon née Gooch
- Education: Blundell's School; St John's College, Cambridge

Richard Beadon (15 April 1737 – 21 April 1824) was Master of Jesus College, Cambridge 1781–1789 and later Vice-Chancellor of the University, Bishop of Gloucester and Bishop of Bath and Wells.

== Life ==
Beadon was born at Pinkworthy in Devon, son of the Rev. Robert Beadon, Rector of Oakford. He was educated at Blundell's School and admitted to St John's College, Cambridge in 1754. He was eighth Wrangler and Senior Chancellor's Medallist in 1758.

He married Rachel, granddaughter of Bishop Gooch, of Ely, and had one son, Richard. He was also the uncle of Frederick Beadon.

It is said he was admirable both as Master and Vice-Chancellor, and a very handsome man. His portrait survives in the College.

== Career ==
- Fellow and Tutor of St. John's
- Archdeacon of London, 1775–1789
- Master of Jesus College, 1781–1789
- Tutor to Prince Frederick William, afterwards Duke of Gloucester
- Bishop of Gloucester, 1789–1802
- Bishop of Bath and Wells, 1802–1824

== Works ==
- A sermon preached before the Lords spiritual and temporal, in the Abbey church of St. Peter, Westminster, on Friday, April 19, 1793,
- A Sermon Preached Before the Incorporated Society for the Propagation of the Gospel in Foreign Parts: At Their Anniversary Meeting in the Parish Church of St. Mary-Le-Bow on Friday, February 19, 1796.

Academic offices
Preceded by William Barford	Cambridge University Orator; 1768–1778	Succeeded by William Pearce
Preceded by Lynford Caryl	Master of Jesus College, Cambridge; 1781–1789	Succeeded by William Pearce
Church of England titles
Preceded by Samuel Hallifax	Bishop of Gloucester; 1789–1802	Succeeded by George Huntingford
Preceded by Charles Moss	Bishop of Bath and Wells; 1802–1824	Succeeded by George Henry Law
