= Francis Goldsmith (MP for Chippenham) =

English politician

Francis Goldsmith (by 1518 – 26 March 1586) of London and Crayford, Kent, was an English politician.

He was a servant of Henry VIII's sixth wife, Catherine Parr. He was a Member (MP) of the Parliament of England for Chippenham in 1547, for Mitchell in October 1553, and Helston in 1559. In 1551, he married Joan (d.1569), daughter of Clement Newce of Much Hadham in Hertfordshire. His daughter Anne married William Lewin.
