= Thomas Kingsmill (professor) =

English academic

Thomas Kingsmill (fl. 1565) was an English academic, Regius Professor of Hebrew at Oxford from 1570.

== Life ==
He was the seventh son of Sir John Kingsmill of Fribock, Hampshire. Entering Magdalen College, Oxford, as a demy, he graduated B.A. in 1559, M.A. in 1564, and supplicated for the B.D. degree in 1572. He was probationer fellow from 1559 to 1568, natural philosophy lecturer in 1563, Hebrew lecturer in 1565, and junior dean of arts in 1567. On 15 December 1565, he was appointed public orator and orated for the visit of Elizabeth I of England to Oxford in 1566, when he gave a very long historical speech. On 2 November 1570, he was appointed Regius Professor of Hebrew. He suffered from mental illness for a time, and was obliged to take on Richard Hooker as a deputy in 1579.

== Works ==
He wrote:

- A Complaint against Securitie in these Perilous Times, London, 1602.
- Classicum Poenitentiale (Tractatus de Scandalo, &c.), 2 pts. Oxford, 1605.
- The Drunkards Warning: a Sermon, London, 1631.
