= Arthur Palmer (scholar) =

Arthur Palmer (1841–1897) was a Canadian-Irish classical scholar.

== Life ==
Born at Guelph, Ontario, Canada, on 14 September 1841, he was the sixth child of Arthur Palmer, archdeacon of Toronto, by his first wife, Hester Madeline Crawford. He was educated, first by his father, then at Guelph grammar school, under the Rev. Edward Stewart. After about four years there he left, in 1856.

In 1857 Palmer went to Cheltenham College in England, where he remained less than a year; the headmaster at the time was Arthur Dobson. He entered Trinity College, Dublin, in 1859, and was elected to its Scholarship in 1861. In 1863, he obtained a B.A. as Senior Moderator and Gold Medallist in classics, as well as a Junior Moderator and Silver Medallist in experimental and natural science. In 1867 he was elected a fellow, and was admitted to M.A., and in 1880 succeeded Robert Yelverton Tyrrell in the chair of Latin. In 1888 he succeeded Thomas Ebenezer Webb as public orator. He was Litt.D. of his own university, and honorary LL.D. of Glasgow (1890) and D.C.L. of Oxford (1894).

From 1867 to 1880 Palmer was a college tutor, and for some years he captained a team of old university cricketers, the Stoics. During the last ten years of his life he suffered from bladder disease, dying of cancer on 14 December 1897.

== Works ==
Palmer's contributions to classical scholarship were mainly emendations of Latin and Greek texts. His published works were:

- Heroides of Ovid, 1874; new edit, (revised and enlarged, with the transl. of Planudes), 1898, Clarendon Press Series
- Elegies of Propertius, 1880.
- Satires of Horace, London, 1883; 5th edit. 1893.
- Amphitruo of Plautus, 1888.
- Records of the Tercentenary Festival of the Dublin University, 1892.
- Catullus in Macmillan's Parnassus Library of Greek and Latin Texts, 1896.

Palmer and Louis Claude Purser completed the editorial work for the final volumes of James Henry’s Aeneidea, a detailed commentary on Virgil’s Aeneid, after the death of John Fletcher Davies, the editor originally appointed by Henry’s trustees. Palmer also worked on Aristophanes, and contributed to the text of the editio princeps of Bacchylides (1897), and first edition of Herondas (1891). He also contributed articles to Hermathena, the Journal of Philology, Classical Review, and other periodicals.

== Family ==
On 4 October 1879 Palmer married Frances Greene of Clevedon. They had two sons: Arthur, born on 13 May 1881, and Uther, born on 20 April 1892.

== Notes ==
Attribution

This article incorporates text from a publication now in the public domain: Lee, Sidney, ed. (1901). "Palmer, Arthur (1841-1897)". Dictionary of National Biography (1st supplement). Vol. 3. London: Smith, Elder & Co.
