= Jebb =

Jebb is a surname. Notable people with this surname include:

- Ann Jebb (1735–1812), British activist and writer
- Caroline Jebb (1840–1930), American intellectual and socialite
- Cindy Jebb, former US Army officer
- Cynthia Jebb, Lady Gladwyn (1898–1990), English diarist and socialite
- David Jebb (c. 1738–1826), Irish engineer
- Eglantyne Louisa Jebb (1845–1925), Irish-born activist
- Eglantyne Jebb (1876–1928), founder of Save the Children
- George Robert Jebb (1838–1927), British civil engineer
- Geraldine Emma May Jebb (1886–1959), British academic and college principal
- Gladwyn Jebb, 1st Baron Gladwyn (1900–1996), British diplomat and politician
- Henry Jebb (died 1811), Irish surgeon
- Jack Jebb (born 1995), English professional footballer
- John Jebb (Dean of Cashel) (died 1787), Irish Anglican clergyman
- John Jebb (reformer) (1736–1786), son of the above, English clergyman and doctor
- John Jebb (bishop) (1775–1833), Irish Anglican bishop
- John Jebb (canon) (1805–1886), nephew of the above, Anglo-Irish clergyman and writer on church music
- Joshua Jebb (1793–1863), British soldier and government administrator
- Katerina Jebb (born 1962), British artist and film-maker
- Kathleen Jebb (1879–1957), British artist
- Keith Jebb, English poet and critic
- Matthew Jebb (born 1958), Irish botanist
- Mitch Jebb (born 2002), American baseball player
- Philip Jebb (1927–1995), British architect and politician
- Dom Philip Jebb (Anthony Jebb) (1934–2014), Benedictine monk
- Sir Richard Jebb, 1st Baronet (1729–1787), English physician
- Richard Jebb (barrister) (1766–1834), Irish judge
- Richard Claverhouse Jebb (1841–1905), British classical scholar and politician
- Richard Jebb (journalist) (1874–1953), English journalist and author
- Rob Jebb (born 1975), English fell-runner
- Samuel Jebb (c. 1694–1772), English physician and literary scholar
- Susan Jebb (born 1964), British nutrition scientist
