= John Jebb =

John Jebb may refer to:

- John Jebb (Dean of Cashel) (died 1787), Irish Anglican priest
- John Jebb (reformer) (1736–1786), son of the latter, English clergyman and doctor
- John Jebb (bishop) (1775–1833), bishop of Limerick
- John Jebb (canon) (1805–1886), nephew of the latter, canon chancellor of Hereford Cathedral
