= Richard Jebb =

Richard Jebb may refer to:

- Sir Richard Jebb, 1st Baronet (1729–1787), English physician
- Richard Jebb (barrister) (1766–1834), Irish judge
- Richard Jebb (journalist) (1874–1953), English journalist and author
- Richard Claverhouse Jebb (1841–1905), British classical scholar and politician
