= Samuel Jebb =

Physician and literary scholar (c. 1694–1772)

Samuel Jebb (c. 1694 – 9 March 1772) was an English physician, nonjuror and literary scholar.

== Life ==
He was born about 1694, probably at Mansfield, Nottinghamshire, the second son of Samuel Jebb, a maltster, and Elizabeth Gilliver. His eldest brother, Richard, settled in Ireland and was the grandfather of Richard Jebb, an eminent Irish judge, and John Jebb, Bishop of Limerick. Another brother, John, became Dean of Cashel, and was father of Dr. John Jebb, the Socinian. Through their maternal ancestors, the Gillivers, the Jebb family would later claim descent from the Dutch statesman Johan de Witt.

Samuel Jebb was educated at Mansfield grammar school, and became a sizar at Peterhouse, Cambridge, on 15 June 1709, aged 15. He graduated B.A. in January 1713. He was intended for the established church, but instead joined the non-jurors, being ordained a Deacon in 1716 and a priest in 1718. he later served as a private chaplain to the Cotton family. According to Nichols, he remained at Cambridge at least till 1718. On leaving Cambridge he became librarian to Jeremy Collier in London, and occupied himself with literary work. After the death of Collier, in 1726, on the advice of Richard Mead, he went into medicine, attending Mead's private practice, and also learning chemistry and pharmacy from Mr. Dillingham, a well-known apothecary of Red Lion Square. He took the degree of M.D. at Reims on 12 March 1728, and set up in practice as a physician at Stratford-le-Bow. Successful in following his profession, he continued his literary work. He did not become licentiate of the Royal College of Physicians till 25 June 1751.

A few years before his death he retired to Chesterfield, Derbyshire, where he died on 9 March 1772. About 1727 he married a relative of Mrs. Dillingham, the apothecary's wife, and left several children, one of whom was the physician, Sir Richard Jebb.

== Works ==
Jebb's literary productions were mainly editions and translations, and he published no original work on medicine. He is best known for his edition of Roger Bacon's Opus Majus undertaken at the suggestion of Richard Mead, to whom it is dedicated. It was the first edition of Bacon's work.

His major classical work was an edition of the works of Aristides, the Greek rhetorician. In 1720 he issued proposals for its publication (in 4 vols. ); it ultimately appeared in 2 vols. 4to, with introduction, collation of manuscripts, and notes.

Jebb published in 1725 a collection of 16 historical memoirs relating to Mary Queen of Scots in Latin, French, and Spanish. In the same year he issued, anonymously, The History of the Life and Reign of Mary Queen of Scots, London, 1725, a dry narrative. A similar work, The Life of Robert, Earl of Leicester, the favourite of Queen Elizabeth, London, 1727, is also attributed to him. He edited the posthumous work of Humphrey Hody, with a dissertation on Hody's life and writings, London, 1742.

In 1722 Jebb started a classical periodical, Bibliotheca Literaria, being a collection of Inscriptions, Medals, Dissertations, intended to appear every two months. Ten numbers were issued from 1722 to 1724. Jebb's own contributions were anonymous. His other publications were:

- A translation of the reply by Daniel Martin, pastor of the French church at Utrecht, to a tract by Thomas Emlyn on a theological point, Cambridge(?), 1718; London, 1719.
- Sancti Justini Martyris cum Tryphone dialogus, ed. S. J., 1719.
- Joannis Caii De Canibus Britannicis, … De Pronunciatione Græcæ et Latinæ linguæ, etc., ed. S. J., 1729.

== Bibliography ==
=== References ===
- Brother Roger Bacon (1219–1292) of the Order of Friars Minor (1733). Opus Majus. From the manuscript Codex Dublinensis of Dublin, collated with certain others, now published for the first time (in Latin). London: Published by Samuel Jebb, M.D. (c. 1694–1772). Printed by William Bowyer – via Internet Archive. See Opus Majus. OCLC 833937085 (all editions).

=== References (general) ===
- This article incorporates text from a publication now in the public domain: Payne, Joseph Frank (1892). "Jebb, Samuel". In Lee, Sidney (ed.). Dictionary of National Biography. Vol. 29. London: Smith, Elder & Co.
