= St. Ann's Church, Dawson Street =

Protestant church in Dublin, Ireland

St. Ann's Church
- St. Ann's Parish Church
- Eaglais Naomh Áine
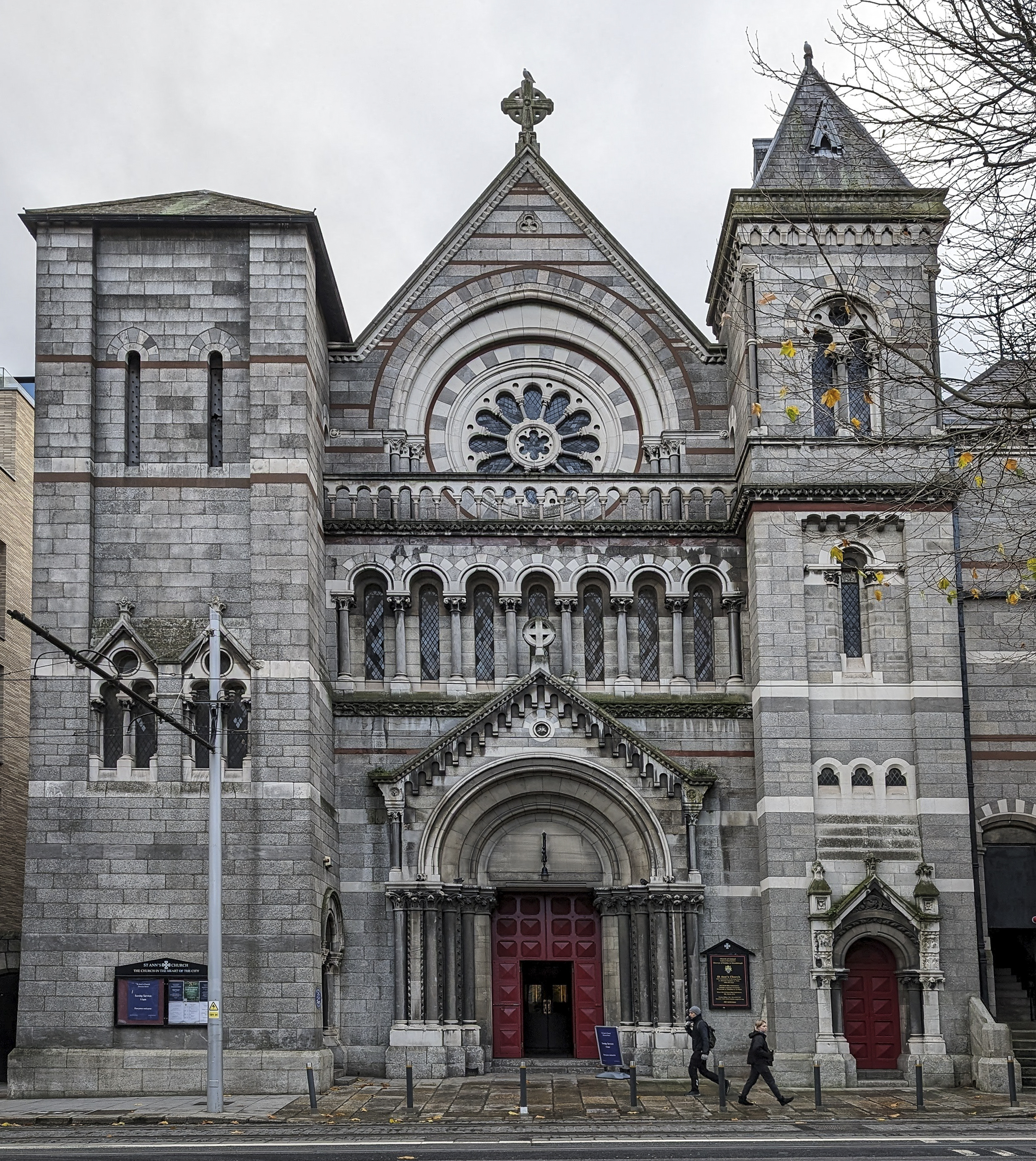
- West facade

- Location in central Dublin
- 53°20′27″N 6°15′28″W
- Location: Dawson Street, Dublin 2
- Country: Ireland
- Denomination: Church of Ireland
- Website: stannsandststephens.ie

History
- Status: In use
- Dedication: Saint Anne

Architecture
- Architect: Isaac Wills
- Architectural type: Church
- Style: Baroque; Neo-Romanesque
- Groundbreaking: 1720
- Completed: 1866

Administration
- Province: Dublin
- Diocese: Dublin and Glendalough
- Parish: Dublin St Anne

Clergy
- Vicar: Vacant

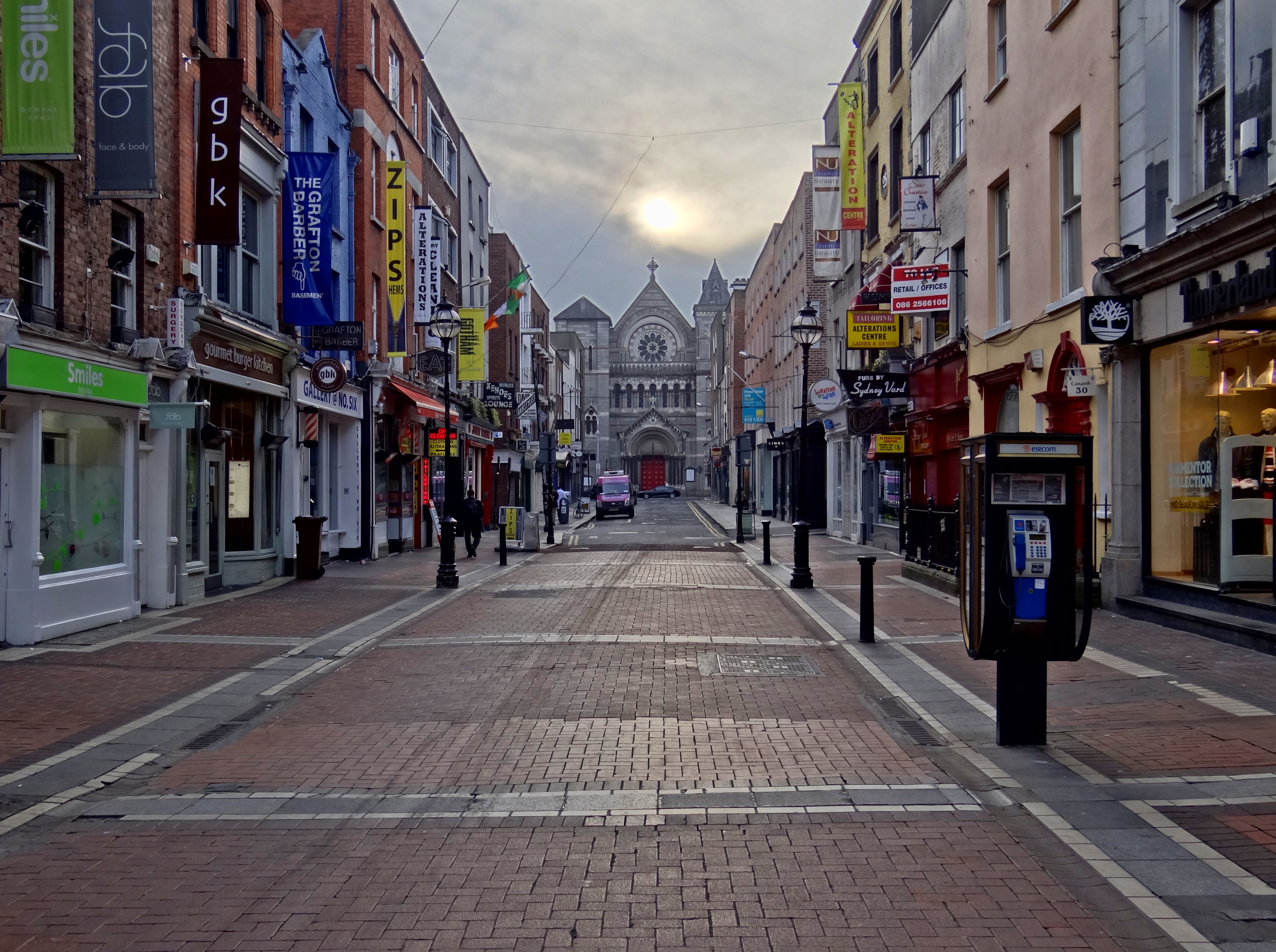
The church faces the eastern end of Anne Street, a shopping and dining street branching off Grafton Street.

St. Ann's Church on Dawson Street in Dublin, Ireland is a Church of Ireland church, constructed originally around 1720 following the establishment of the local Anglican parish in 1707.

In the early 21st century the church presents itself as ecumenical within the tradition of the Church of Ireland.

== History ==
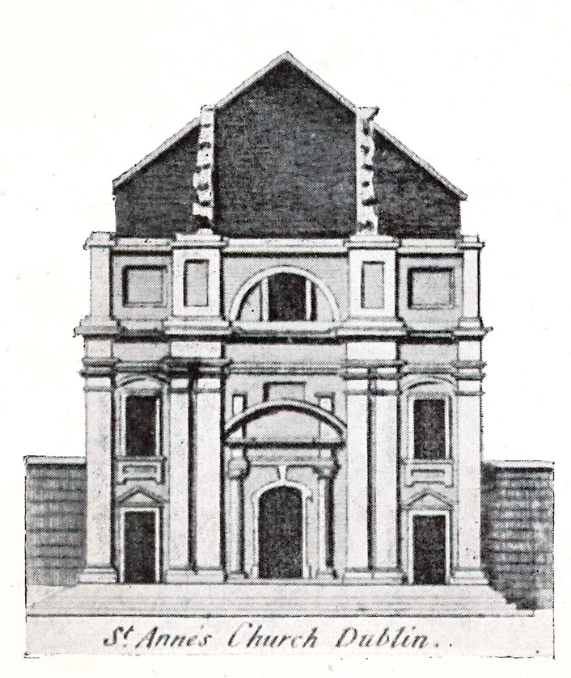
St Anns church, an illustration of how it would have originally looked from the gentleman's magazine.

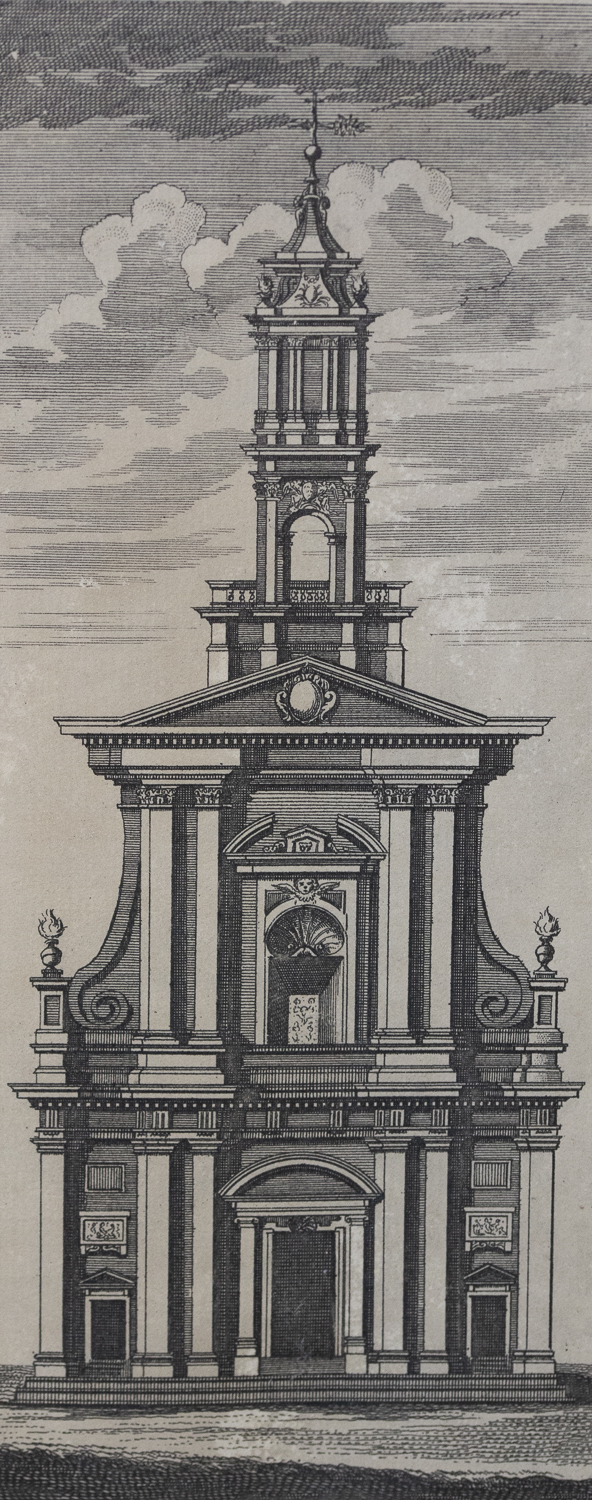
An illustration of the church taken from Charles Brooking's map of Dublin (1728).

Dawson Street was first laid out by Joshua Dawson around 1707-9 with South Anne Street following shortly after around 1718, connecting Dawson Street directly with Grafton Street.

=== 1720 church ===
In 1720, the most prominent and visible location bookending Anne Street was chosen as the site of the new parish church terminating the vista.

The building of the church in baroque style commenced around 1720, to a design by Isaac Wills or Thomas Burgh. It bears a resemblance to the baroque Church of the Gesù and the San Giacomo degli Incurabili in Rome for the base with the top resembling that of the Sant'Agnese in Agone. The original façade was never completed above the first floor.

It features in Charles Brooking's map of Dublin (1728) as well as in illustrations of the church in the Victoria and Albert Museum which was completed by James Thornhill prior to his death in 1734.

=== 1868 church ===
The current façade dates to 1868.

In 1868, a competition was held for a new façade, with the architectural firm of Lanyon, Lynn & Lanyon losing the commission to the Deanes, Thomas Newenham Deane and his father. The younger Deane, who had been involved with the creation of significant buildings at Oxford University, designed a neo-Romanesque front. Described by one travel guide as "amazingly ornate," the façade as it exists in the 21st century lacks some elements of Deane's original conception, most significantly the tallest tower; the design as Deane submitted it can be viewed online. From an architectural perspective, this omission has been criticised as disrupting the building's flow from the rectory to the spire.

== Interior ==
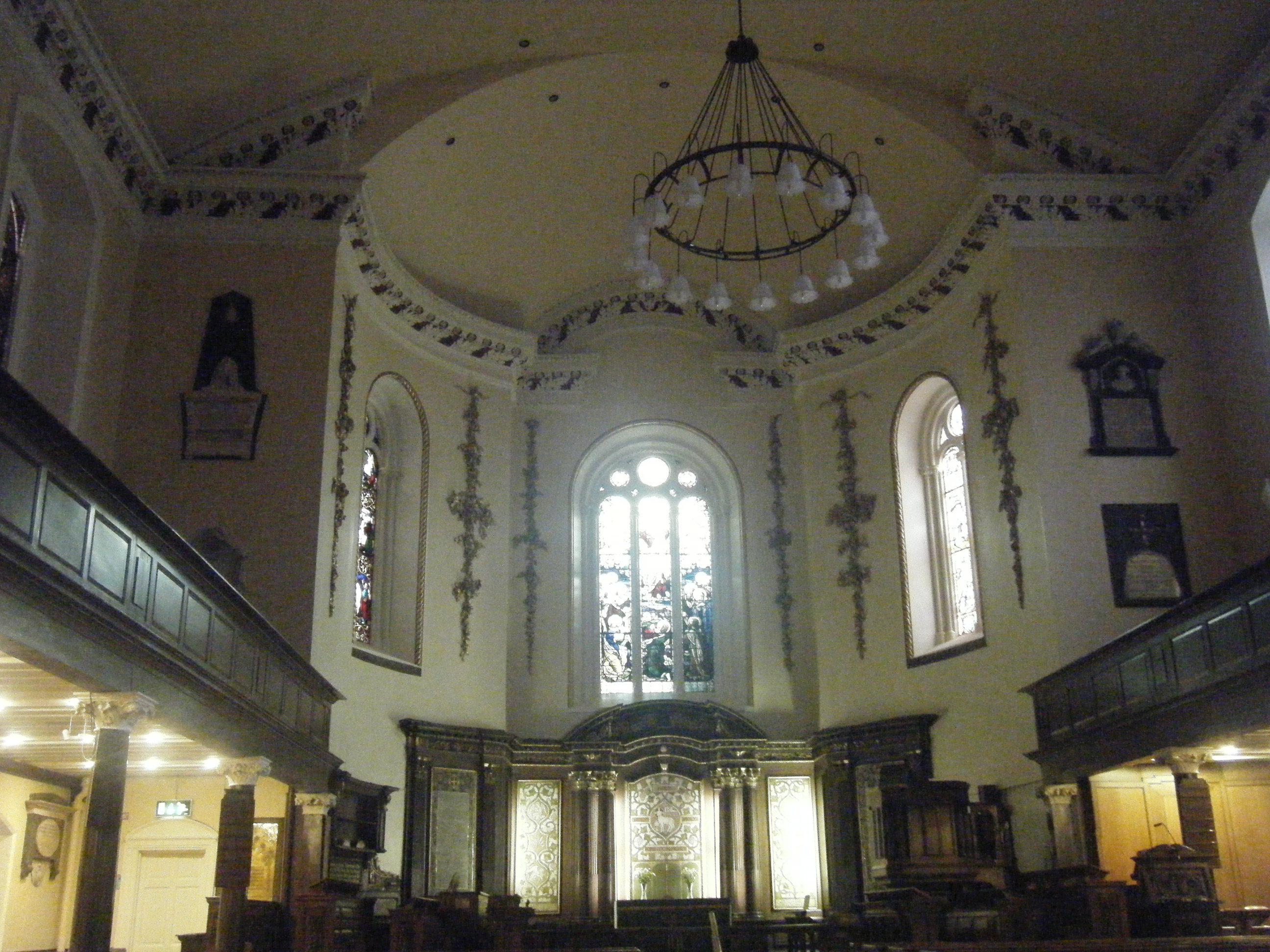
The apse, with two loaves of bread resting on the Bread Shelf to the left of the altar

The Georgian interior was designed by Isaac Wills, influenced by churches built by Christopher Wren but with variations characteristic of Irish architecture. The church underwent a major renovation in 2009.

St. Ann's is noted for its wood carving. The carved reredos, placed within a shallow rounded apse, shares an unusual decorative feature with the reredos of the former St. Mary's in Dublin: Corinthian pilaster capitals with twin acanthus scrolls. The acanthus frieze is carved with winged angels and bishop's mitre; the segmental pediment, with festoons of flowers. The craftsman's name is unrecorded.

=== The Bread Shelf ===
A distinctive woodworking and charitable feature of St. Ann's is the Bread Shelf. Since 1723, as a result of a bequest by Lord Newton of Newtown Butler, the church has made daily bread available to anyone who chooses to receive it. The bread is placed near the altar on a shelf between acanthus-carved volutes.

=== Stained glass windows ===
Victorian-era stained glass replaced the original 18th-century clear windows. Some windows commemorate people associated with the church. Three windows in the south aisle are notable for their artistic merit; these were designed by Wilhelmina Geddes of the An Túr Gloine (Tower of Glass) studio for stained-glass artists. One on the north aisle was created by Geddes with Ethel Rhind. St. Ann's is said to contain "more stained glass than any other church in Dublin".

=== The organ ===
Written sources from 1742 record a subscription drive for the purpose of purchasing an organ for the church. The case of the modern organ, located in the west gallery of the church, is presumed to remain from the original 18th-century instrument. William Telford built the organ in 1834. It has been renovated numerous times. In 1911, the water-powered blower was replaced with an electrical blower, and in 1925 the organ underwent a tubular pneumatic conversion with a new console.

== List of organists at St Ann's ==
- John McCalley (c1780-c1790)
- George William Torrance (1851–1854)
- William Houghton (?-1871)
- Dr. James C. Culwick (1871–1881)
- Arthur St. George Patton (1881–1892)
- Henry Gladney Gick (1892–1918)
- Sidney Lovett FRCO (1918–1919)
- Lennox Braid (1920–1934)
- William J. Watson FRCO (1935–1987)
- Mark Armstrong (1987–1989)
- David Smith (1990–1991)
- J. Paul Kermode (1991–1992)
- Graham Walsh (1992–1993)
- Hilary Dungan (1993–1995)
- Stanley Monkhouse (1995–2003)
- Peter O'Connor (2003–2004)
- Aiden Scanlon (2004–2011)
- Charles Marshall (2011 – )

== Associated people ==
Oscar Wilde was baptised within the current parish, at the former St. Mark's Church; St. Ann's now possesses the relevant records after the two parishes were merged. Dracula author Bram Stoker was married at St. Ann's (1878), as was Irish patriot Wolfe Tone (1785). Anthony St. Leger, founder of the St Leger Stakes horse race, was buried in the churchyard of St. Ann's. The philanthropist Thomas Barnardo as a boy attended St. Ann's Sunday school.

English poet Felicia Hemans, who lived on Dawson Street from 1831, is buried in the church's crypt. The church contains memorials to the Irish theologian Alexander Knox; Richard Whately, the "eccentric" Anglican Archbishop of Dublin appointed 1831; and art collector and benefactor Hugh Lane, who created major collections of modern art in Dublin. Sir Thomas Vesey is also buried here, as is William Downes, 1st Baron Downes, Lord Chief Justice of Ireland. The reredos commemorates thirty-two men killed in World War I, and five in World War II, who were from the parish.
