= Jubb (surname) =

Jubb is a surname, and may refer to:

- Daniel Jubb (born 1984), British rocket scientist
- David Jubb (born 1969), British theatre producer
- Eric Jubb (born 1931), Canadian swimmer at the 1948 Summer Olympics
- George Jubb (1717–1787), English Anglican priest
- Ken Jubb (1912–1993), English rugby league footballer
- Paul Jubb (born 1999), English tennis player
- Will Jubb (born 1996), English rugby league footballer

== See also ==
- Jebb
