= Thomas Paul (priest) =

Irish Anglican priest

- Church: Church of Ireland

Personal details
- Education: Trinity College Dublin

Thomas Paul was an Irish Anglican priest in the second half of the 18th century.

A graduate of Trinity College, Dublin, he was Dean of Cashel from 1758 until his resignation in 1769. His wife was the sister of Bishop James Hawkins.

Religious titles
Preceded by William Gore	Dean of Cashel; 1758–1769	Succeeded by John Jebb
