= Peterstow =

Village in Herefordshire, England

Coordinates: 51.9181°N 2.63505°W

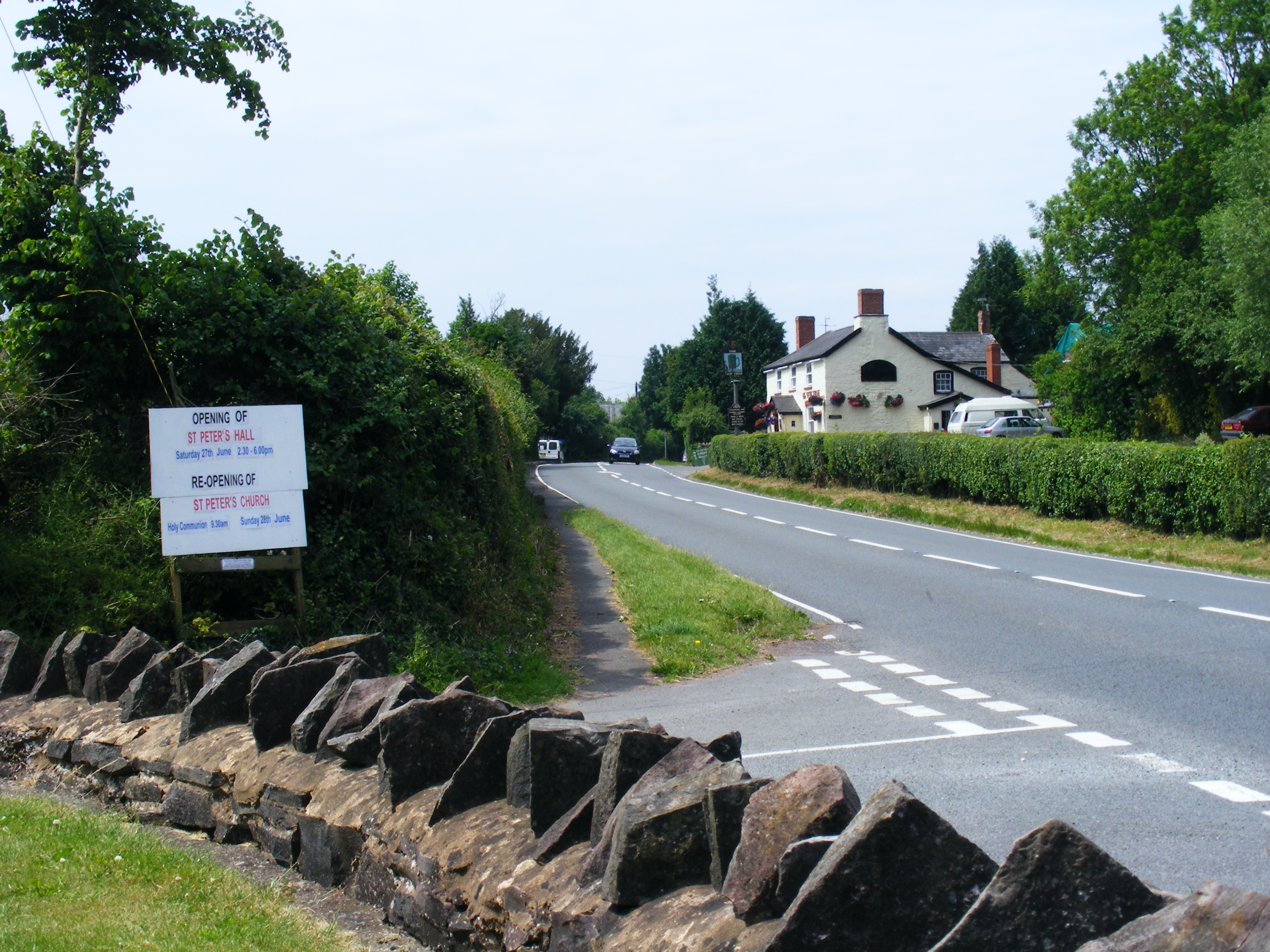
- Yew Tree Inn, Peterstow

- Location within Herefordshire
- Population: 444 (2011)
- OS grid reference: SO564245
- Shire county: Herefordshire
- Region: West Midlands
- Country: England
- Sovereign state: United Kingdom
- Post town: Ross-on-Wye
- Postcode district: HR9
- Dialling code: 01989
- Police: West Mercia
- Fire: Hereford and Worcester
- Ambulance: West Midlands
- UK Parliament: Hereford and South Herefordshire

Peterstow is a village and civil parish in Herefordshire, England, situated about 2 miles (3 km) west of Ross-on-Wye on the A49.

== General description ==
Among the general features of the village is the Church of England parish church, begun in the Norman period contained windows from 13th and 14th centuries; and so too the chancel. The door had a scissor braced roof. The tower and spire were 15th century. The pulpit was typically for Herefordshire a Jacobean example.

A former Wesleyan Methodist Chapel, and The Common, with a war memorial in the form of a stone cross bearing the village name. There is also a pub, the Yew Tree, and a village stores and Post office. The village school closed in 1969, and is now a private dwelling. The village bakery is a successful business which has a shop in Ross-on-Wye.

In 1874, a Thomas Blake gave land for the Wesleyan Methodists to build a chapel. In the simpler architectural style typical of the Primitive Methodists, this was used by the Wesleyans for 50 years. The chapel was bought by the Parish Church in 1924, and used as a church hall until a few years ago. It was sold because it is not possible to install modern facilities including water supply and drainage. It is now in private ownership.

== History ==
The name of the village has changed several times during the past 1,000 years. The first recorded name Llanpetyr (from 1045 to 1104) is Welsh. The name Petrestowe was found in 1278. Other variants from 1291 to 1724 are Ecclesiade-Petrestowe; Petrustoye; Petrestowe; and Pitstowe.

Possibly the earliest record of habitation in the area relates to iron ore smelting in Roman, and possibly medieval times. Artefacts relating to this are on display in the Heritage Centre at Ross.

In 1100, Henry I set up three royal manors in Herefordshire, including the manor of Wilton, which included Peterstow.

== St Peter's Church ==
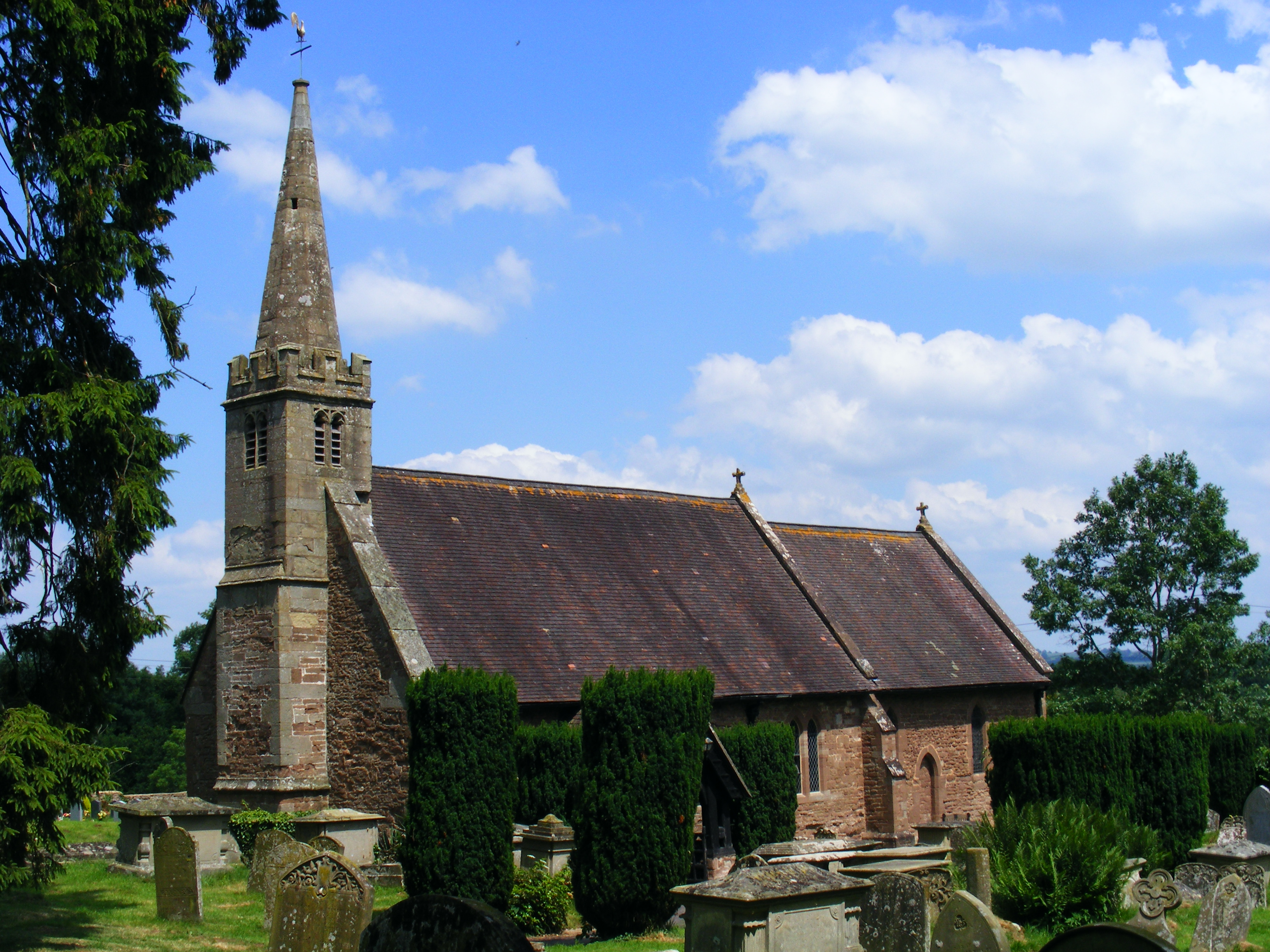
St Peter's Church, Peterstow

St Peter's Church is in the Ross and Archenfield Deanery of the Diocese of Hereford.

The earliest known building was Anglo-Saxon, built on the site of an existing burial ground. A reference in the Book of Llandaff says that Herwald, Bishop of Llandaff, consecrated a church at Llanbedr in 1066. A 12th century Norman building replaced this, using some of the enormous foundation stones. This was rebuilt in 1330. A font and bell tower were added in the 15th century, and a panelled pulpit in the 17th.

The present appearance of the building is due to the "great restoration" in the 1860s, under the rector, John Jebb with George Gilbert Scott as architect. The re-opening was on 2 July 1866.

In 2009 the nave was "re-ordered", the pews being removed and a modern wooden floor and chairs being installed. The west end was partitioned off to provide for a kitchen, and a toilet to disabled access standards. Other equipment includes a new amplification system with audio induction loop. The nave is available as a village hall when not required for Church services. The chancel has not been altered during this work (other than redecoration), and preserves the character of a place of Christian worship.

The former rectory, renamed Peterstow Manor, is a Grade II listed country house, mostly of 18th- and 19th-century construction, with parts dating back to 1541.

== Recreation ==
The Herefordshire Trail long-distance footpath passes through the village.

== Items of interest ==
Until mains water was provided in 1960, the village was supplied by wells and pumps. Of several ram pumps installed around the village, one manufactured by Green and Carter has been restored and is pumping water at the Flann (one of the original farms of Peterstow).

== Gallery ==
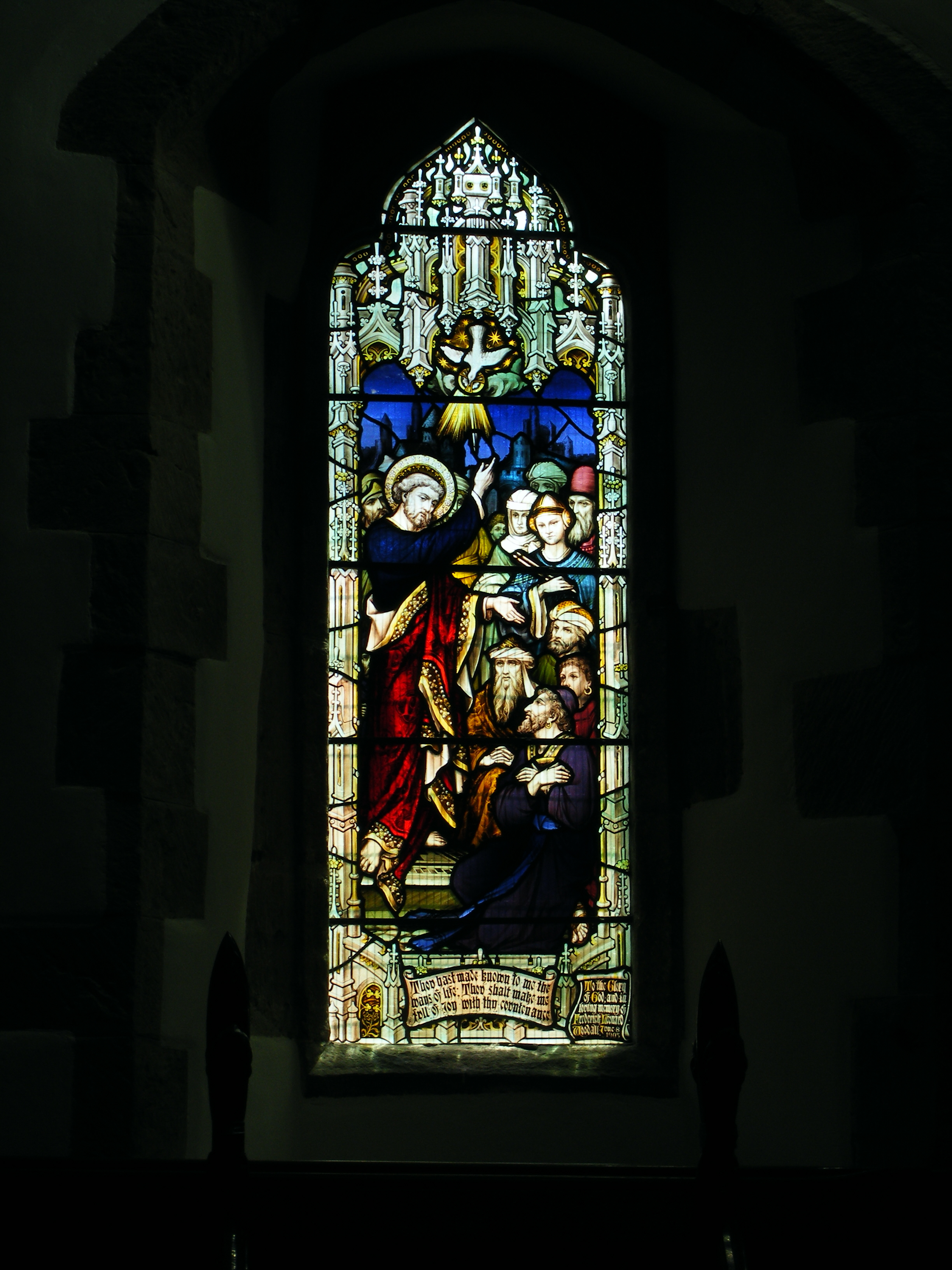
One of the windows in St Peter's Church

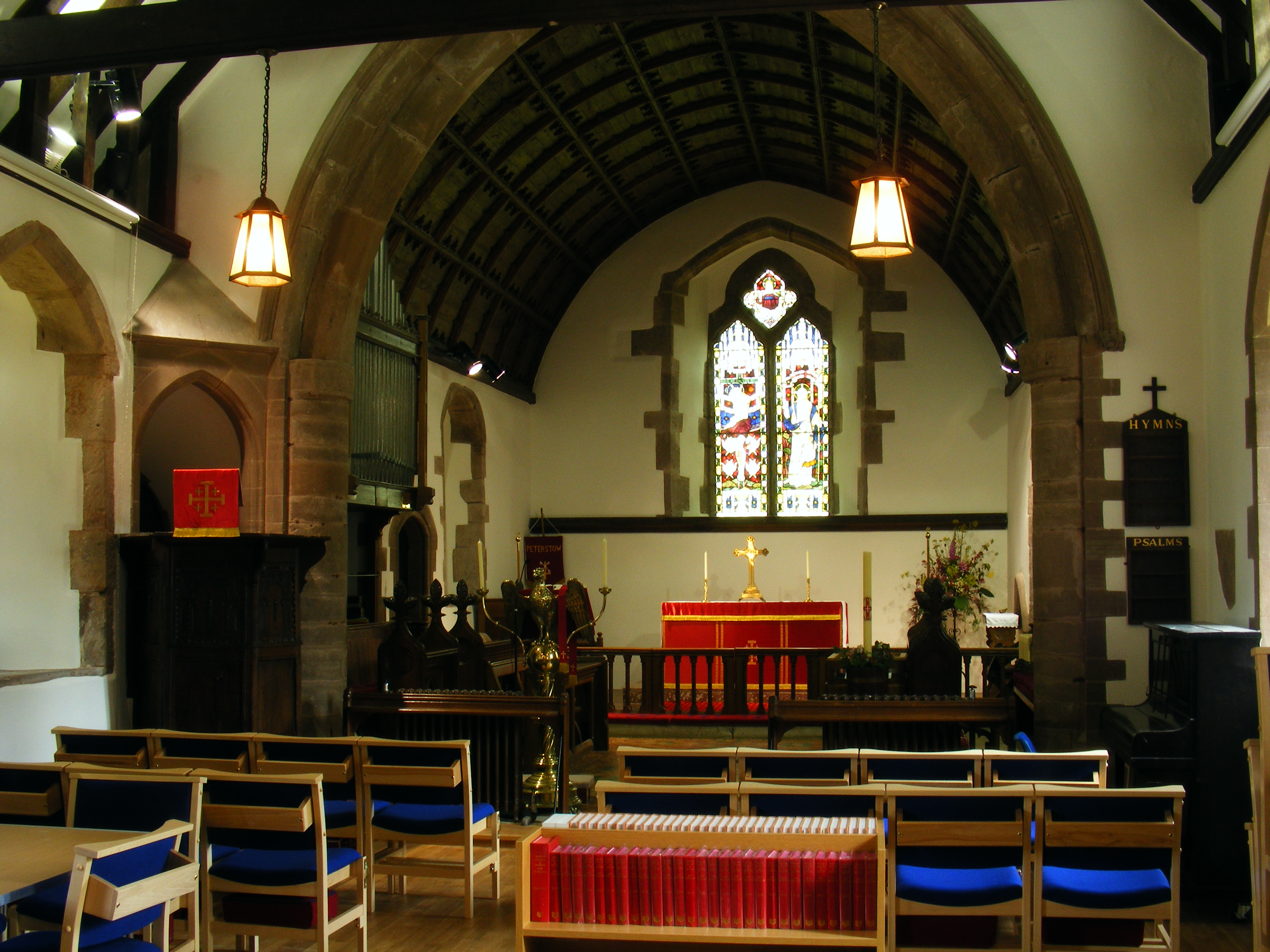
Interior of St Peter's Church after re-ordering of the nave

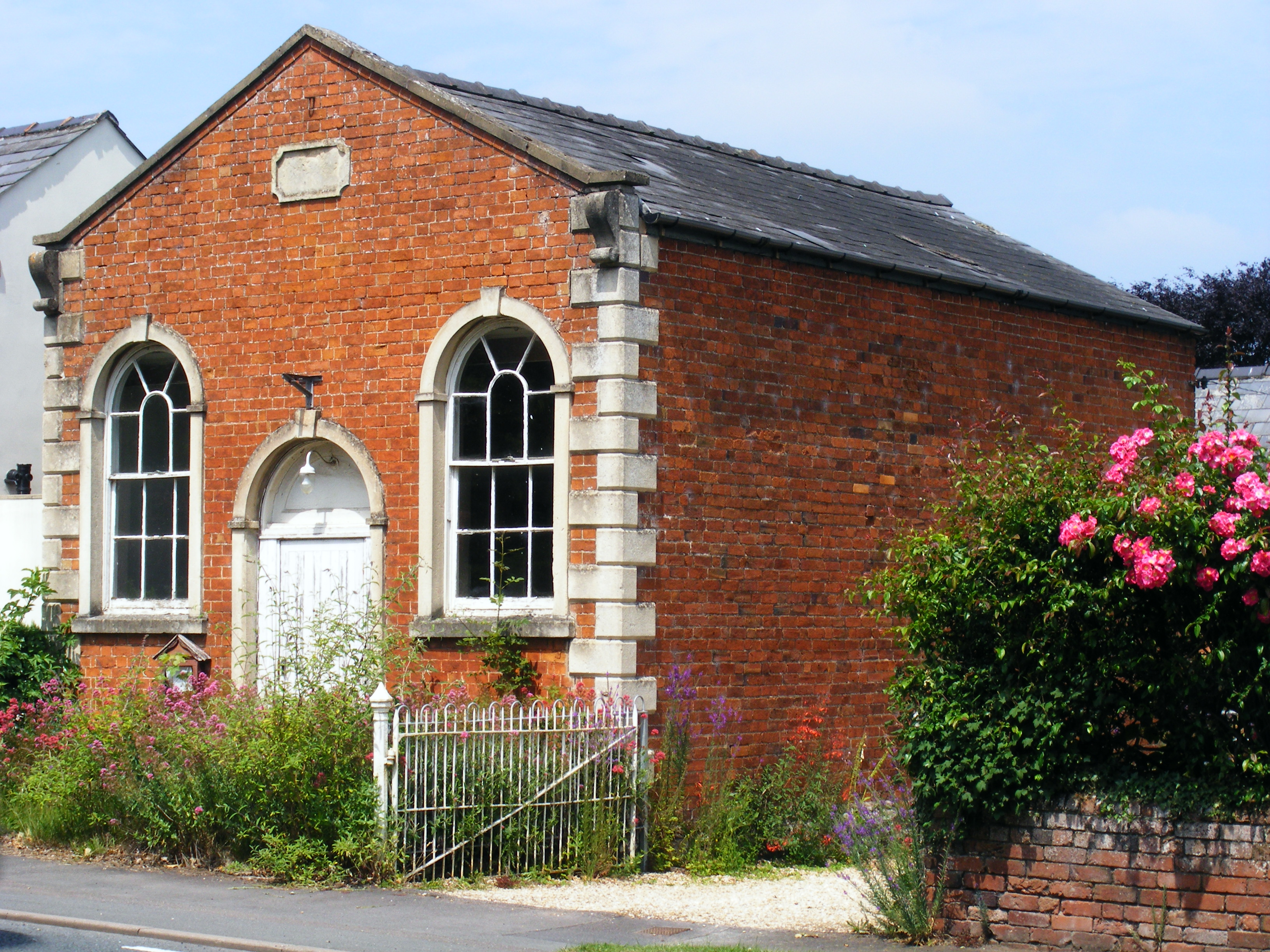
Former Wesleyan Methodist Chapel

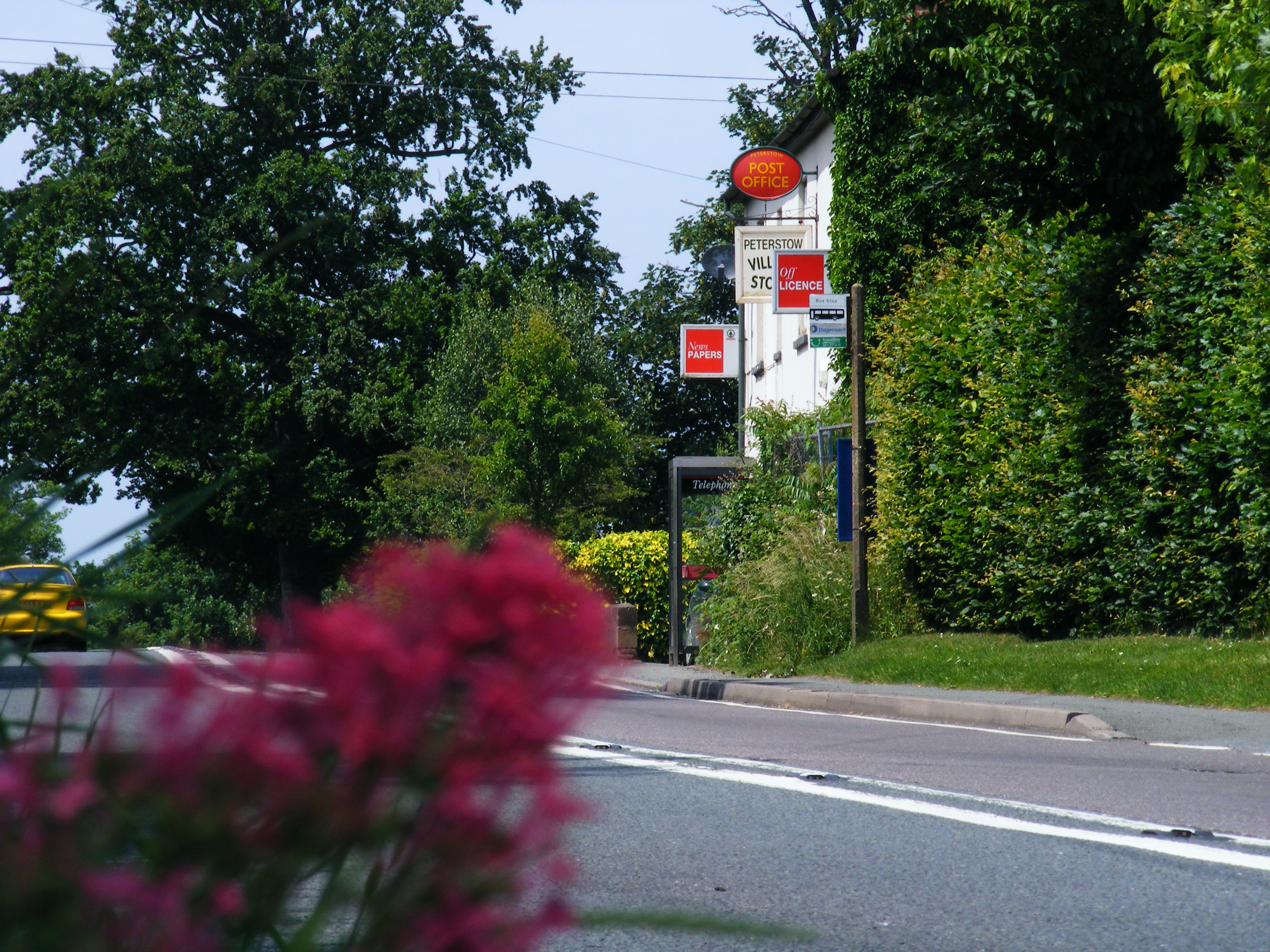
Village store and Post Office

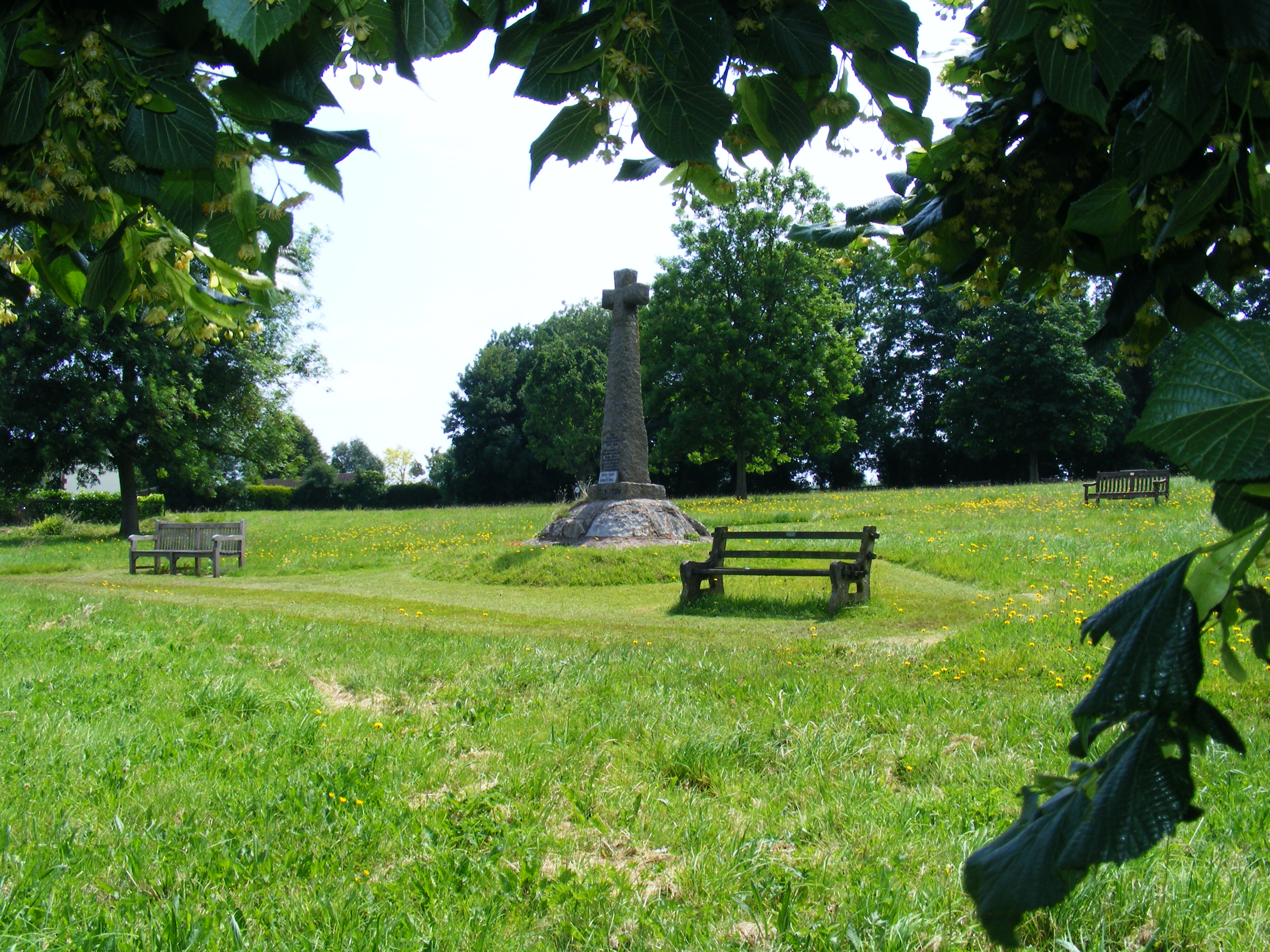
The Common

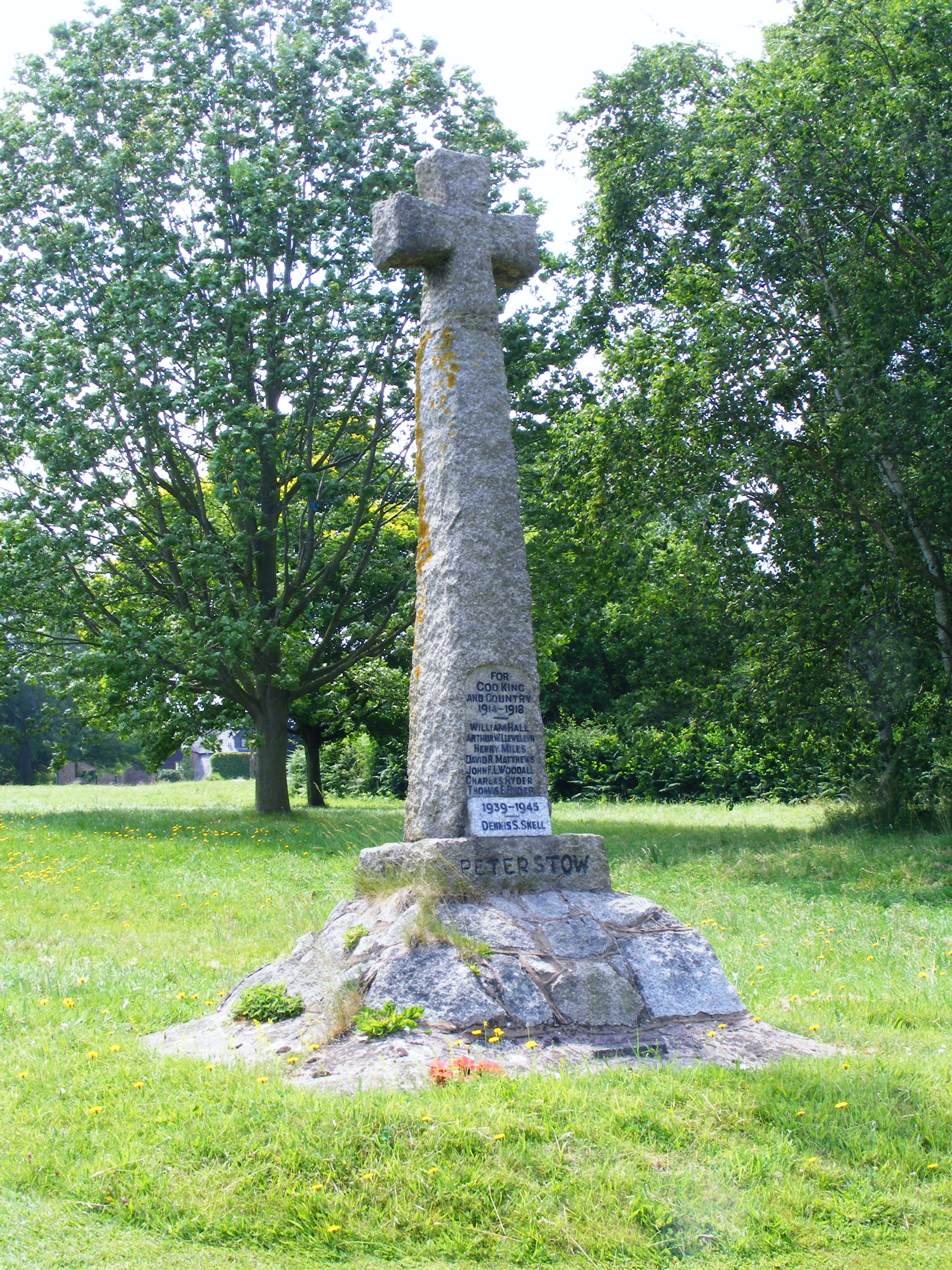
War memorial
