= John Radcliff (Irish judge) =

Anglo-Irish lawyer and judge

John Radcliff (1765 – 19 July 1843) was an Anglo-Irish lawyer and judge.

== Biography ==
Radcliff was the son of Richard Radcliffe, clergyman, and his wife Christian, daughter of Robert Mason. He was born in County Fermanagh, but from 1766 was raised in Drogheda. Here he was educated alongside his lifelong friend, Richard Jebb, before attending Trinity College Dublin. Radcliffe matriculated on 2 December 1782, aged 17, was created a scholar in 1785, and obtained his Bachelor of Arts in 1787. That year he moved to London to study at the Middle Temple, before returning to Ireland and being admitted to the Irish bar in 1789.

In 1790 he obtained his Bachelor of Laws from Trinity College Dublin and became a Legum Doctor in 1795. Radcliff thereafter became a successful lawyer and prosecuting counsel, being appointed judge of the Irish prerogative court in 1816. That year he established a house on Henrietta Street, Dublin for storing wills and court records, which remained the purpose of the building until the establishment of the Public Record Office of Ireland in 1867. Radcliff became a member of the Privy Council of Ireland in 1818.

He married Catherine Cox, daughter of Michael Cox, archbishop of Cashel, in 1787. At some point in the 1790s he was widowed and married Betanna Slacke, by whom he had two sons. He died in Dublin on 19 July 1843 and was buried at Donnybrook, Dublin.

=== Co-author of Belmont Castle ===
While in London in late 1787 and early 1788, Radcliff co-wrote the epistolary satirical novel Belmont Castle: or, Suffering Sensibility alongside Jebb and another friend from Trinity, Wolfe Tone. While primarily authored by Tone, Radcliffe contributed ten sections, which in Tone's opinion were "by far the best". Owing to his connection by marriage to several prominent Anglo-Irish aristocrats, Radcliffe also provided much of the social background to the book's satire. To exonerate the authors from potential libel action, Radcliffe wrote a prefix for the novel which emphasised its humorous intent. Despite their friendship as young men, Radcliff did not share Tone's radical political views and the two men did not continue their association with each other into the 1790s.
