= Opus Majus =

1267 treatise by Roger Bacon

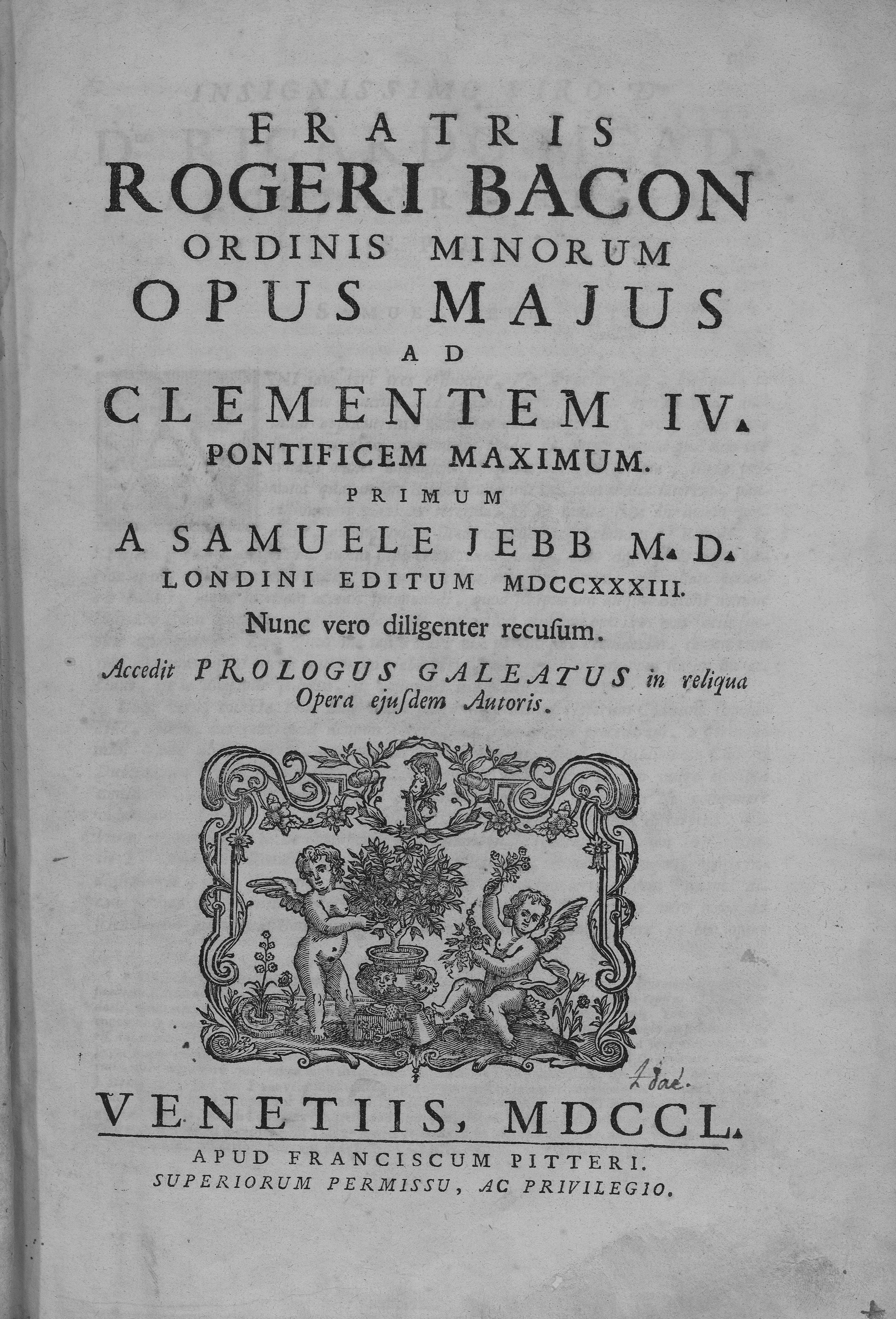
Opus maius, 1750 edition

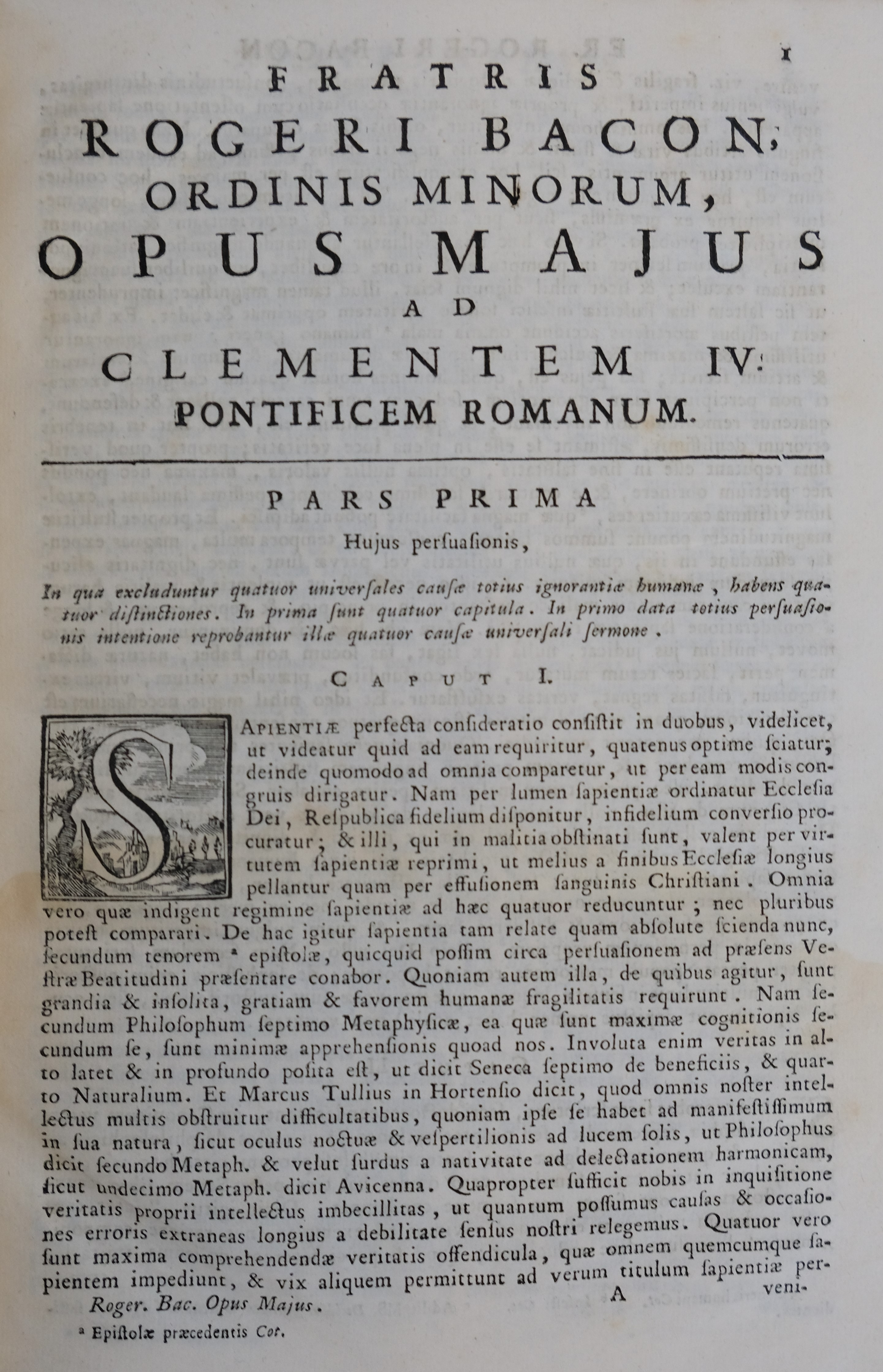
First page of a 1750 edition of Opus majus

The Opus Majus (Latin for "Greater Work") is the most important work of Roger Bacon. It was written in Medieval Latin, at the request of Pope Clement IV, to explain the work that Bacon had undertaken. The 878-page treatise ranges over all aspects of natural science, from grammar and logic to mathematics, physics, and philosophy. Bacon sent his work to the Pope in 1267. It was followed later the same year by a smaller second work, his Opus Minus, which was intended as an abstract or summary of the longer work, followed shortly by a third work, Opus Tertium, as a preliminary introduction to the other two.

== Contents ==
The Opus Majus is divided into seven parts:

1. Part one considers the obstacles to real wisdom and truth, classifying the causes of error (offendicula) into four categories: following a weak or unreliable authority, custom, the ignorance of others, and concealing one's own ignorance by pretended knowledge.
2. Part two considers the relationship between philosophy and theology, concluding that theology (and particularly Holy Scripture) is the foundation of all sciences.
3. Part three contains a study of Biblical languages: Latin, Greek, Hebrew, and Arabic, as a knowledge of language and grammar is necessary to understand revealed wisdom.
4. Part four contains a study of Mathematics: As part of the study, he vividly drew out the flaws in the Julian Calendar, proposing to drop a day every 125 years from 325 CE (Council of Nicaea). He also noted the shifting of the Equinoxes to the Solstices.
5. Part five contains a study of Optics: The study of optics in part five seems to draw on the works of the Arab writers Kindi and Alhazen, including a discussion of the physiology of eyesight, the anatomy of the eye and the brain, and considers light, distance, position, and size, direct vision, reflected vision, and refraction, mirrors and lenses.
6. Part six, De scientia experimentalis, a study of Experimental Science: It includes a review of alchemy, the creation of gunpowder and of the positions and sizes of the celestial bodies, and anticipates later inventions, such as microscopes, telescopes, spectacles, flying machines, hydraulics and steam ships. The occult overtones of this section reflect Bacon's interest in magic, which he also wrote about in De secretis operibus artis et naturae, et de nullitate magiae. It was a major influence on John Dee's theory of Archemastrie.
7. Part seven considers moral philosophy and ethics.

Historian Amanda Power emphasizes that this major work cannot be usefully read exclusively in the context of the history of science and philosophy while forgetting to consider Bacon's religious commitment to the Franciscan Order. "His Opus maius was a plea for reform addressed to the supreme spiritual head of the Christian faith, written against a background of apocalyptic expectation and informed by the driving concerns of the friars. It was designed to improve training for missionaries and to provide new skills to be employed in the defence of the Christian world against the enmity of non-Christians and of the Antichrist".

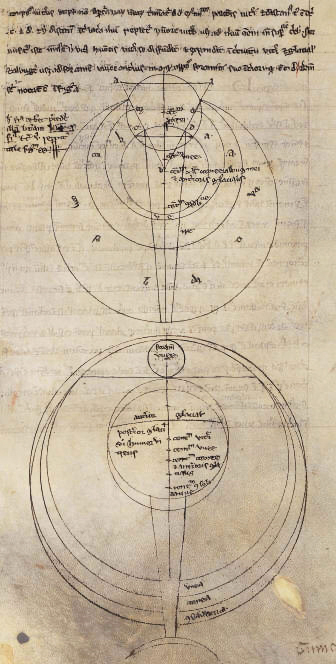
Bacon's optic studies, from Opus Majus

== Publication history ==
An incomplete version of Bacon's Opus Majus was published by William Bowyer in London in 1733. It was edited by Samuel Jebb from a manuscript at Trinity College, Cambridge which omitted the seventh part.

== Sources ==
- A History of Western Philosophy Vol. II by Ralph McInerny from the Jacques Maritain Center, University of Notre Dame
- Roger Bacon from the Catholic Encyclopedia
- Fr. Rogeri Bacon Opera quaedam hactenus Inedita, Vol. 1 at Google Books. Contains the Opus Tertium, Opus Minus, and Compendium Philosophiae.
