= Anne Street South =

Street in central Dublin, Ireland

- South Anne Street
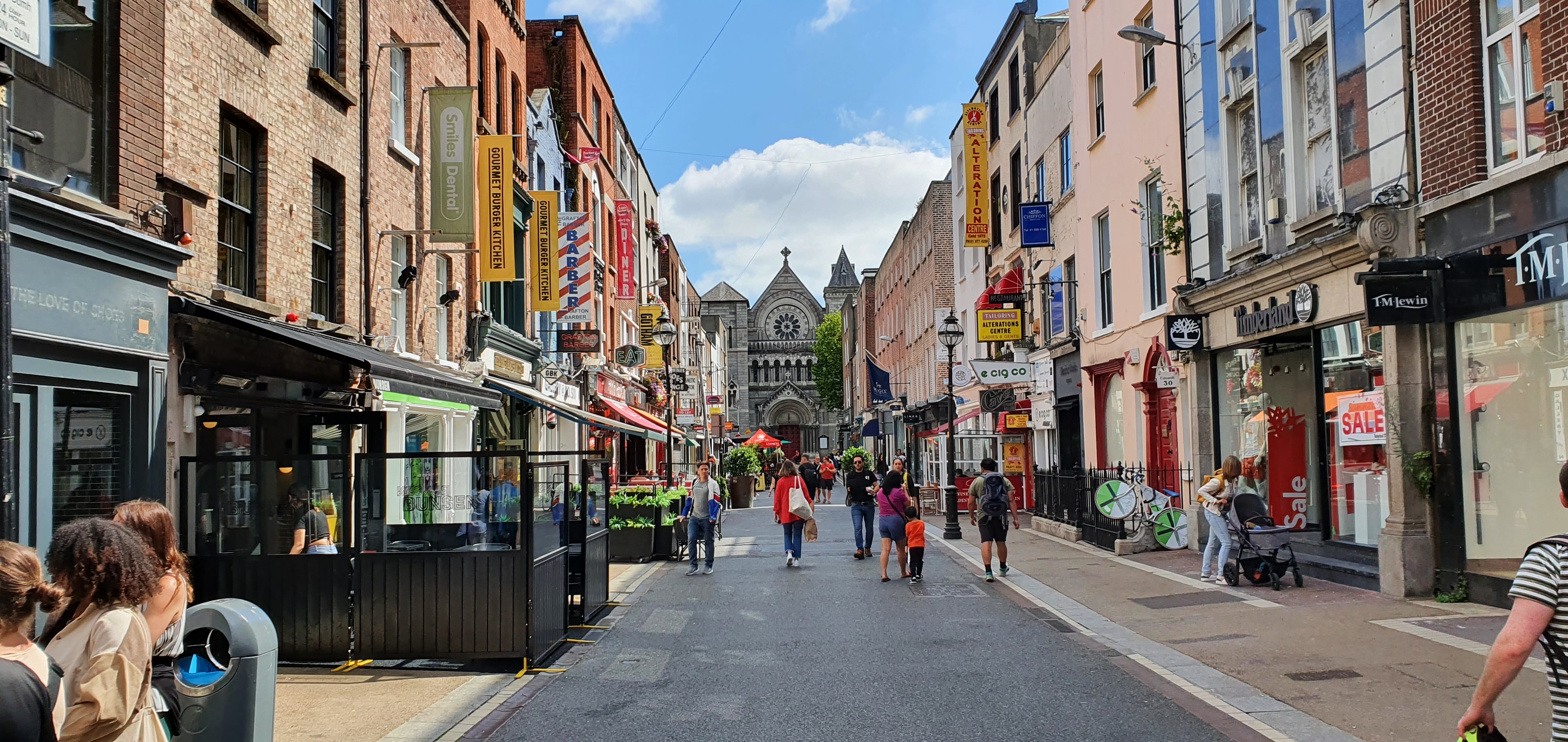
- Anne Street South

- Location within Central Dublin
- Native name: Sráid Anna Theas (Irish)
- Namesake: Queen Anne
- Location: Dublin, Ireland
- Postal code: D02
- Coordinates: 53°20′28.23″N 6°15′37.49″W
- West end: Grafton Street
- East end: Dawson Street

Anne Street South (Irish: Sráid Anna Theas) is a street on the southern side of central Dublin, Ireland, running from Grafton Street to Dawson Street.

== Location ==
The western half of Anne Street South is pedestrianised where it meets Grafton Street, one of Dublin's primary shopping streets. To the east, it is overlooked by St Ann's Church, a Church of Ireland church in baroque style designed in 1720, with its current facade dating to 1868. It is adjoined by Duke Lane Lower and Anne's Lane.

== History ==
The street was developed by Joshua Dawson, who in 1705 acquired land from Henry Temple and Hugh Price. It, along with Grafton Street, Dawson Street and Harry Street, to which it continues across Grafton Street, was developed on the land. It was completed in 1723.

It is named after Anne, the reigning queen of Great Britain and Ireland at the time of its construction.

== Buildings and businesses ==
Primarily commercial, Anne Street South contains a mixture of independent and chain retailers, restaurants and other businesses. It is home to Kehoe's, first licensed in 1803 and considered a notable example of a Victorian-style Dublin pub. Adjacent to Grafton Street, property on Anne Street became increasingly coveted by retailers in the 1990s.
