= Humphrey Hody =

English scholar and theologian

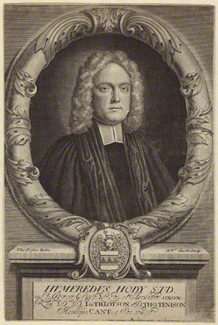
Humphrey Hody, line engraving by Michael Vandergucht

Humphrey Hody (1659 – 20 January 1707) was an English scholar and theologian.

== Life ==
He was born at Odcombe in Somerset in 1659. In 1676 he entered Wadham College, Oxford, of which he became a fellow in 1685. In 1692 he became chaplain to Edward Stillingfleet, bishop of Worcester, and for his support of the ruling party in a controversy with Henry Dodwell regarding the non-juring bishops he was appointed chaplain to Archbishop John Tillotson, an office which he continued to hold under Thomas Tenison.

In 1698 he was appointed Regius Professor of Greek at Oxford, and in 1704 was made archdeacon of Oxford.

== Works ==
In 1684 he published Contra historiam Aristeae de LXX. interpretibus dissertatio, in which he argued that the so-called "Letter of Aristeas", containing an account of the production of the Septuagint, was the late forgery of a Hellenic Jew originally circulated to lend authority to that version. The dissertation was generally regarded as conclusive, although Isaac Vossius published an angry and scurrilous reply to it in the appendix to his edition of Pomponius Mela.

In 1689 Hody wrote the Prolegomena to the Greek chronicle of John Malalas, published at Oxford in 1691. In 1701 he published A History of English Councils and Convocations, and in 1703 in four volumes De Bibliorum textis originalibus, in which he included a revision of his work on the Septuagint, and published a reply to Vossius.

A work, De Graecis Illustribus, which he left in manuscript, was published in 1742 by Samuel Jebb, who prefixed to it a Latin life of the author.
