= Alexander Knox (theologian) =

Irish lay theological writer (1757–1831)

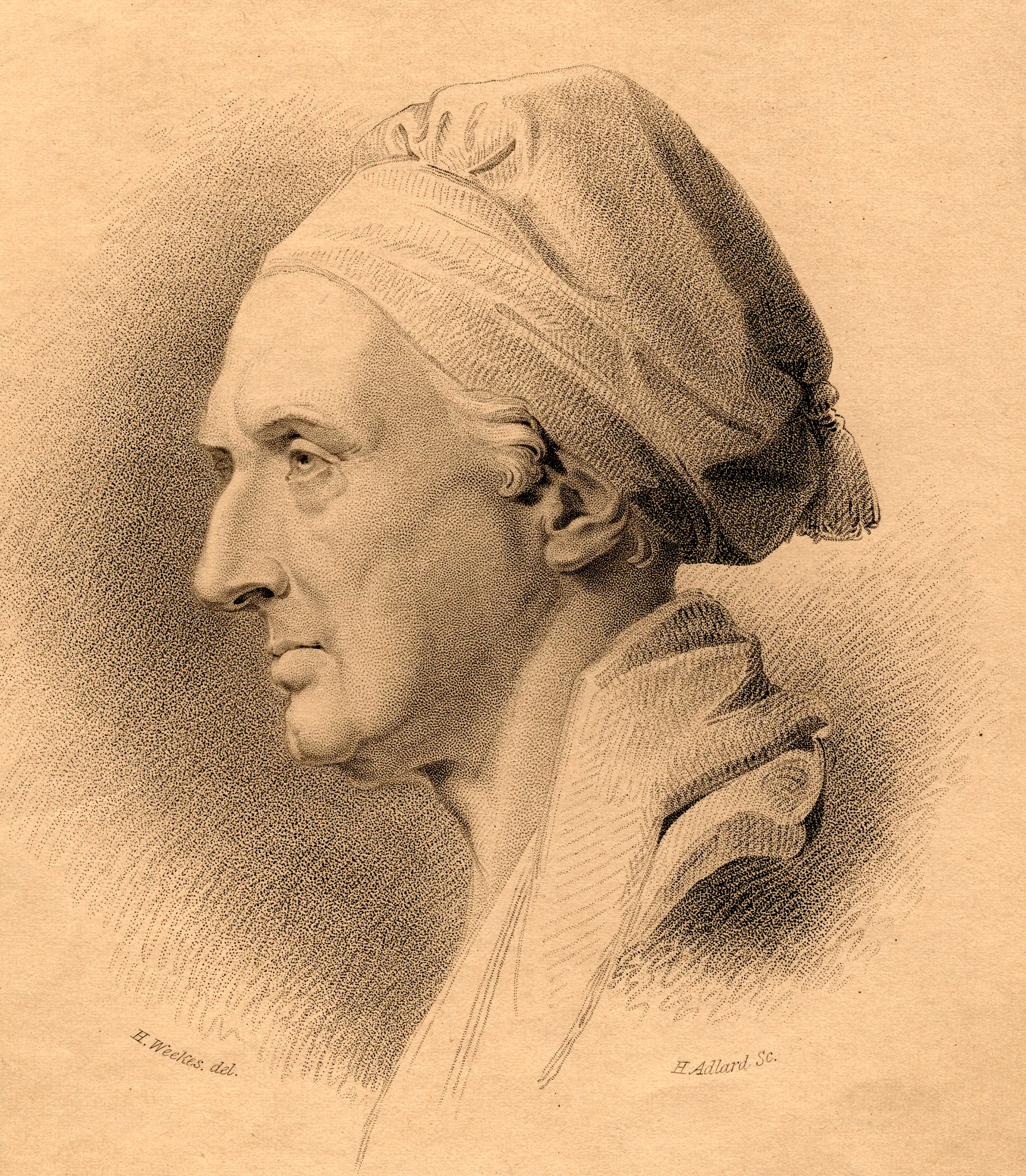
1834 engraving after a bust by Francis Leggatt Chantrey

Alexander Knox (March 17, 1757–January 17, 1831) was an Irish lay theological writer. He has been described as "an exemplar of the often-neglected High Church tradition within the Church of Ireland" and as "one of the most formative figures in the development of Anglicanism as a distinctive form of church life".

== Life ==
As a boy and young man, Alexander Knox befriended and corresponded with John Wesley. Although he asserted his theological independence from Methodism, later, he published defences of Wesley against John Walker and Robert Southey.

In the 1790s Knox entered political life, briefly (in 1798) becoming private secretary to Lord Castlereagh and publishing Essays on the political circumstances of Ireland (1799) before retiring from politics in 1799.

Knox lived in or near Dublin for the final three decades of his life, becoming known as the "sage of Bellevue". Together with his friend John Jebb, bishop of Limerick, Knox developed a distinctive style of high-churchmanship (evidenced in his theology of sacraments) which also respected strains in evangelicalism, Methodism and seventeenth-century latitudinarianism. Knox wrote in defence of Catholic emancipation.

== Works ==
- Essays on the political circumstances of Ireland during the administration of Lord Camden; with an appendix containing thoughts on the will of the people (1799)
- An Answer to the Rt Hon. P. Duigenan's Two Great Arguments Against the Full Enfranchisement of the Irish Roman Catholics (1810)
- On the Doctrine Respecting Baptism Held by the Church of England (1820)
- An Enquiry on Grounds of Scripture and Reason into the Use and Import of the Eucharistic Symbols (1824)
- Letters on the Re-Union of the Churches of England and Rome (1824)

A collection of Knox's papers were published posthumously in four volumes of collected writings from 1834 onwards titled Remains of Alexander Knox.
