= John Jebb (Dean of Cashel) =

Irish Anglican priest

John Jebb (died 1787) was an Irish Anglican priest in the second half of the 18th century.

He was born in Mansfield, Nottinghamshire, one of the four sons of Samuel Jebb, a prosperous brewer, and Elizabeth Gilliver. His brothers included the physician Samuel Jebb, father of the Royal Doctor Sir Richard Jebb, 1st Baronet, and Richard, who moved to Ireland and produced a number of distinguished descendants. Through their maternal ancestors, the Gillivers, the Jebb family would later claim descent from the Dutch statesman Johan de Witt.

A graduate of Peterhouse, Cambridge, he was Chaplain to William Cavendish, 4th Duke of Devonshire. He was Treasurer of Christ Church Cathedral, Dublin from 1740 and Dean of Cashel from 1769, holding both posts until his death in 1787.

He married Anne Gansel, daughter of David (or Daniel) Gansel of Donnyland House, Colchester, and had two sons: John Jebb, a political and social reformer and a clergyman noted for his Socinian views, and David. Anne's brother Lieutenant General William Gansel (died 1774) was celebrated in his lifetime as the protagonist in Gansel's case, arising from his shooting at Samuel Lee, who had attempted to evict him from his lodgings. Gansel argued that just as a householder is entitled to defend his dwelling house, so a lodger is entitled to defend his lodgings.

His grandnephew, grandson of his brother Richard, also called John Jebb was Bishop of Limerick, Ardfert and Aghadoe from 1823 until 1833.

Religious titles
Preceded by Thomas Paul	Dean of Cashel; 1769–1787	Succeeded by Joseph Palmer
