= Kathleen Jebb =

British artist

Kathleen Mary Jebb (1879–1957) was a British artist, known for her landscape paintings of Wales and the West Country.

== Biography ==
Jebb was born in Liverpool and raised at West Derby and then at Westbury-on-Trym in Bristol. She lived in Bristol for the rest of her life and taught part-time at the Bristol Municipal School of Art in the 1910s. Jebb painted watercolours, created prints and engravings, often back in white, with the landscapes of the West Country and the Welsh borders being her regular subjects. Throughout her career, Jebb exhibited at the Royal Academy in London, at the Royal West of England Academy in Bristol, the Walker Art Gallery in Liverpool and with the Royal Scottish Academy. She was elected an Associate of the Royal West of England Academy and the Bristol Museum & Art Gallery holds examples of her work.
