= John Jebb (canon) =

Anglo-Irish Anglican priest and writer

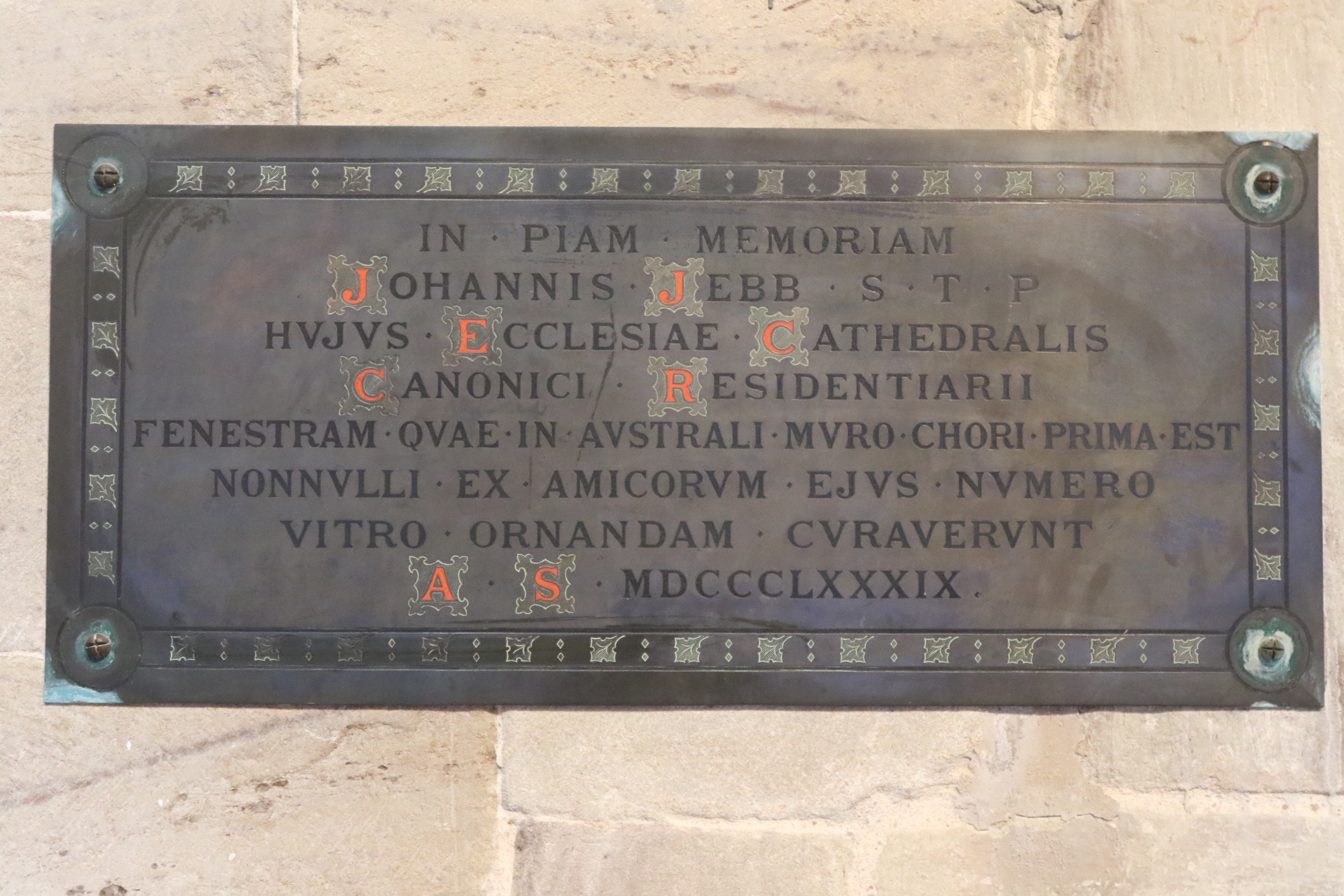
Memorial in Hereford Cathedral

John Jebb (21 September 1805 in Dublin – 8 January 1886 in Peterstow, Herefordshire) was an Anglo-Irish Anglican priest and writer on church music.

== Life ==
Jebb was the eldest son of Mr Justice Richard Jebb of the Irish Court of King's Bench and his wife Jane Louisa Finlay, and nephew of John Jebb, Bishop of Limerick. He was educated at Winchester College and Trinity College, Dublin. After graduating MA in 1829, Jebb briefly held the rectory of Dunerlin in Ireland before becoming a prebendary of Limerick Cathedral (1832), rector of Peterstow, Herefordshire (1843), a prebendary of Hereford Cathedral (1858) and a canon residentiary (1870).

Jebb married Frances, daughter of General Sir Richard Bourke, in September 1831 (she died in 1866).

Jebb was a leading authority on the Anglican choral tradition and a significant figure in the English choral revival. When Walter Hook, vicar of Leeds, proposed to reinstate choral services and a surpliced choir at Leeds Parish Church in 1841, it was to his friend Jebb that he looked for advice. With his cathedral background Jebb argued that in churches with a choir, the desired musical effect should not be marred by "the roar of the congregation". He persuaded Hook to adopt the cathedral form of service at Leeds rather than the alternative model demonstrated by the Revd Frederick Oakeley at Margaret Chapel, London, in 1839, where the choir’s role was to lead the congregation in response, hymn and psalm.

Jebb's policy was first made public in Three Lectures on the Cathedral Service (1841). A more scholarly and definitive treatment of the topic was published in his The Choral Service of the United Church of England and Ireland (1843) which was an enquiry into the low state of service and music provision in cathedrals and collegiate churches.

He funded the building costs of the new rectory at Peterstow. St Peter's Church at Peterstow was restored in the 1860s under Jebb with Sir George Gilbert Scott as architect. The reopening was on 2 July 1866.

== Writings ==
- Three Lectures on the Cathedral Service of the Church of England (Leeds, 1841)
- The Choral Service of the United Church of England and Ireland, being an Inquiry into the Liturgical System of the Cathedral and Collegiate Foundations of the Anglican Communion (London, 1843)
- The Choral Responses and Litanies of the United Church of England and Ireland (London, 1847)
