= Richard Jebb (barrister) =

Anglo-Irish judge (1766–1834)

Richard Jebb (1766–1834) was an Anglo-Irish judge of the nineteenth century. He was a member of a gifted family of English origin, which produced a celebrated doctor, three distinguished clerics, and a noted classical scholar.

== Background ==
He was born in Drogheda, eldest son of John Jebb and his second wife Alicia Forster. His father was an alderman of Drogheda, and also had an estate at Leixlip in County Kildare; his grandfather, the elder Richard Jebb, had emigrated to Ireland from Mansfield in Nottinghamshire. Richard's great-grandfather was a prosperous brewer.

Richard's younger brother was John Jebb, Bishop of Limerick. The two brothers were very close throughout their lives, and John, who never married, lived with Richard as a young man. Their father suffered serious financial losses, but Richard at the age of twenty-one inherited a substantial fortune from his father's cousin Sir Richard Jebb, 1st Baronet, a distinguished doctor who became physician to King George III. John Jebb, the clergyman and religious reformer, was another cousin who belonged to the Irish branch of the family; he was the son of yet another John Jebb, Dean of Cashel.

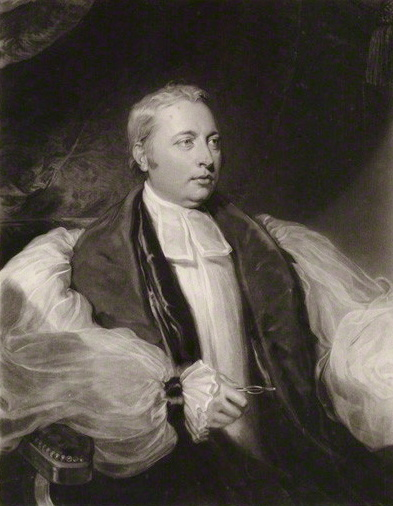
Richard's younger brother John Jebb, Bishop of Limerick.

== Career ==
Richard was educated at a local school in Drogheda, then at Trinity College Dublin, from which he graduated in 1786. He was a friend of Theobald Wolfe Tone, and contributed to Tone's epistolary novel "Belmont Castle" alongside his friend John Radcliff; but even as a young man he did not share Tone's radical political views, and became increasingly conservative as he grew older. Daniel O'Connell, a hostile witness, called him a fanatical Orangeman. He entered Lincoln's Inn and was called to the Irish Bar in 1789, becoming King's Counsel in 1806. He was a moderate opponent of the Act of Union 1800, although in his pamphlet "Arguments for and against the Act of Union", he endeavoured to be fair to both sides of the debate.

Like many former opponents of the Union, he was prepared to accept office under the new regime, although he refused to sit in the English House of Commons. He became Third Serjeant in 1816, Second Serjeant in 1818 and a justice of the Court of King's Bench (Ireland) in 1818. As a judge his most notable trial was that of John Scanlan in 1819 for the murder of his lover (possibly his wife) Ellen Scanlan, who later became celebrated as The Colleen Bawn.

He died suddenly at his home in Rostrevor, County Down in 1834, a victim of the first great cholera epidemic in nineteenth-century Europe.

== Family ==
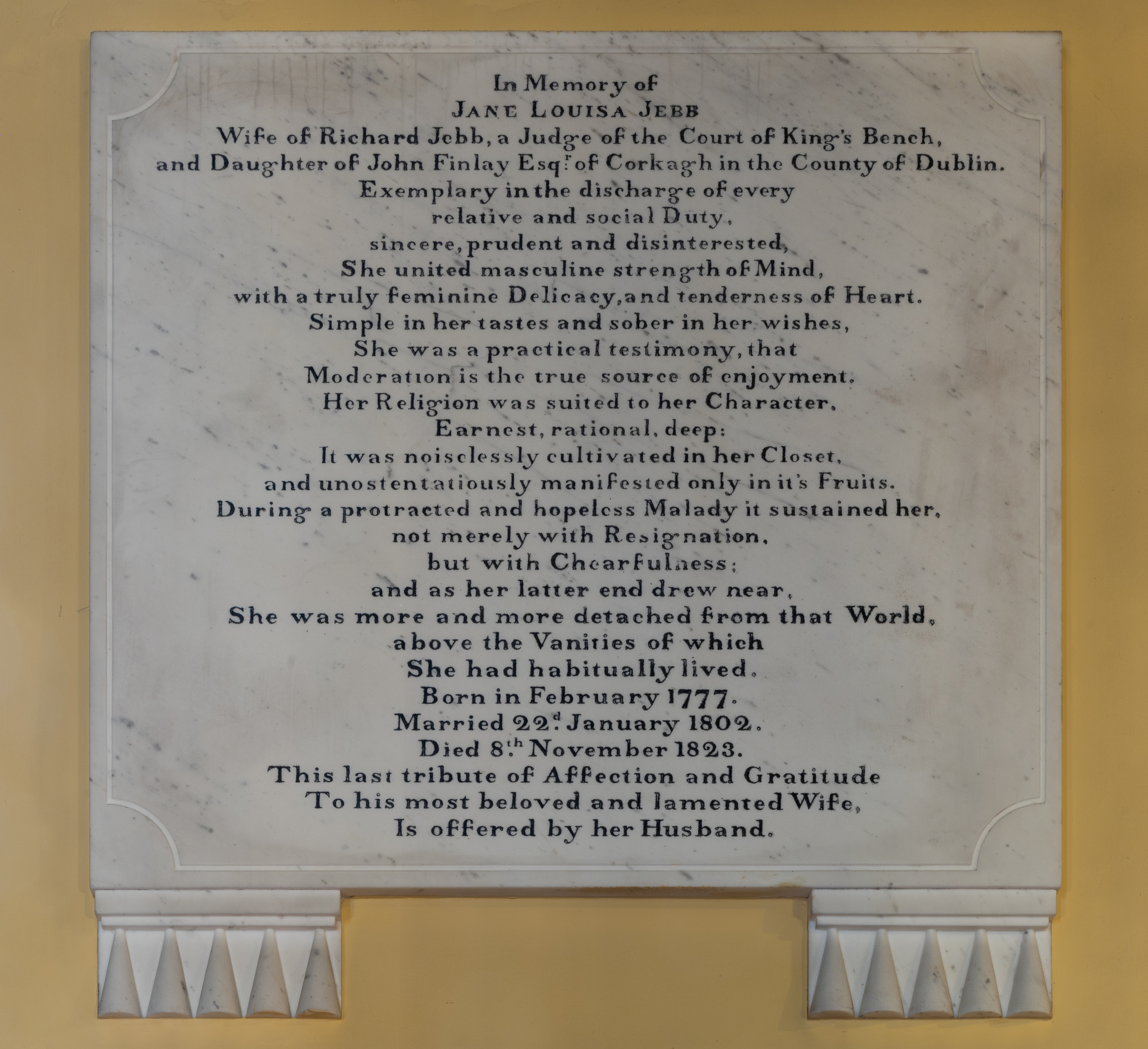
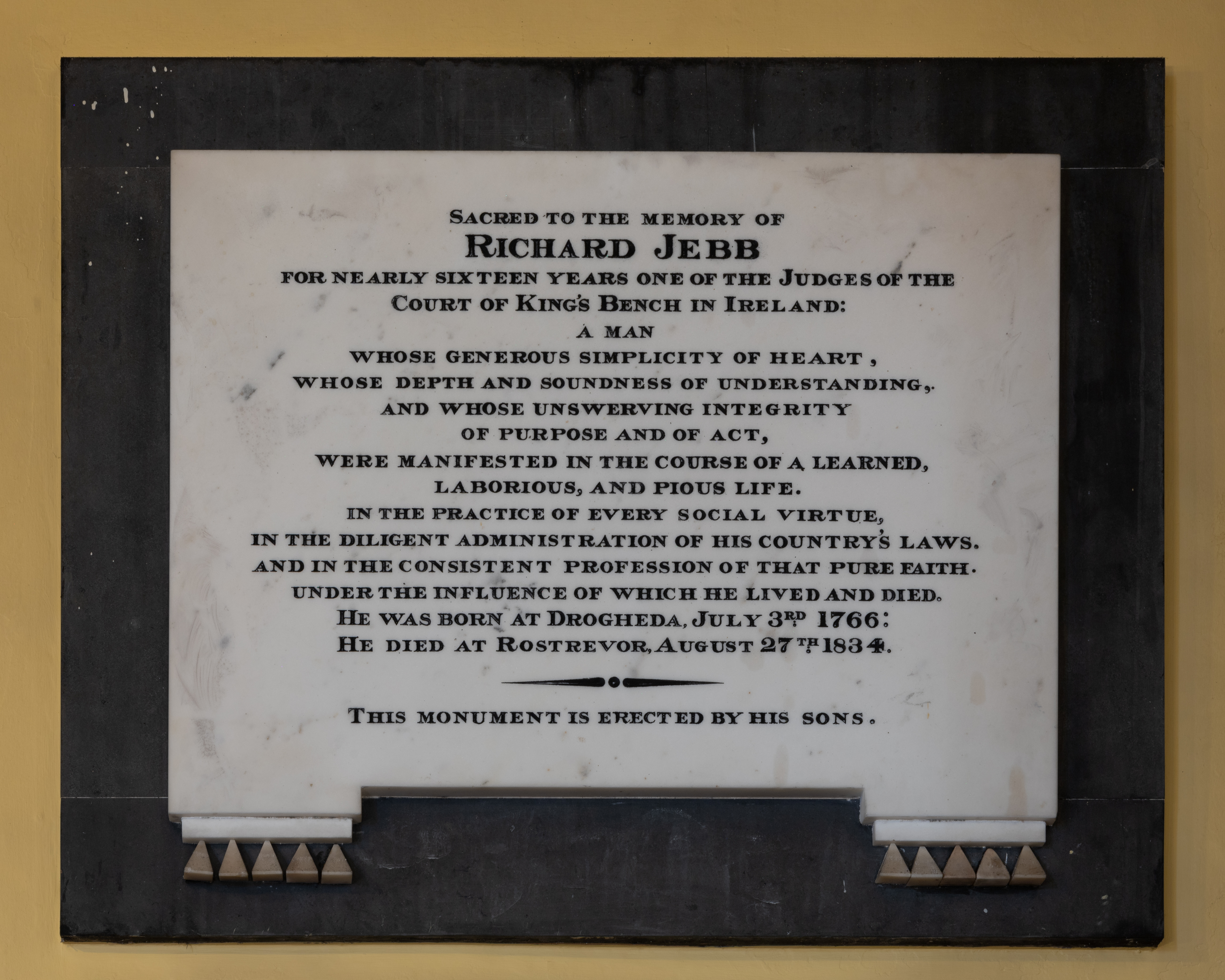
Monuments to Jane Louisa and Richard Jebb in St. Peter's, Drogheda

He married in 1802 Jane Louisa Finlay, eldest daughter of John Finlay of Corkagh, MP for County Dublin and his wife Elizabeth Stear of Bedfordshire, who is said to have been a considerable heiress. Louisa was described as a woman of exceptional strength of character; she died in 1823, after a long and painful illness. They had six children, five sons and a daughter, of whom the best known is John Jebb (1805-1886), Canon of Hereford Cathedral. Their second son Robert followed his father to the Bar, had a successful career, and by his wife Emily Harriet Horsley, a descendant of Bishop Samuel Horsley, he was the father of the politician and classical scholar Richard Claverhouse Jebb and the social reformer Eglantyne Louisa Jebb.

There are memorials to Richard and Jane Louisa Jebb in St. Peter's, Drogheda.

== Character ==
As a judge, he has been described as firm, but also humane and impartial. Elrington Ball calls him a gifted man who, like his brother Bishop Jebb, was often underestimated by those who knew him, due to his modest and unassuming manner. Both men had a keen sense of humour, although the Bishop usually reserved his jokes for the family circle. Daniel O'Connell detested him, calling him "an Orange Order partisan and a frightful judge"; but O'Connell had little good to say of any of the Irish judges of his time.

He served as the District Grand Master of District Grand Lodge of Madras (1814-1819).

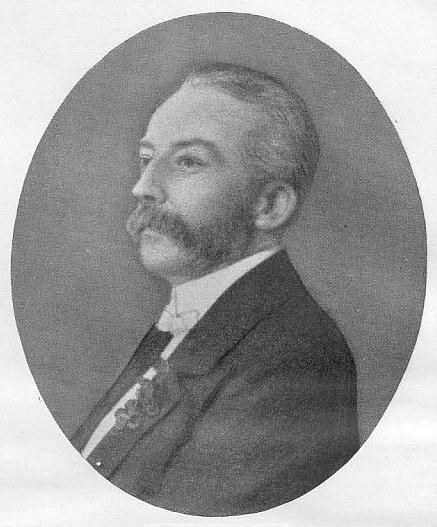
Richard's grandson, Richard Claverhouse Jebb
