= John Jebb (reformer) =

English divine, medical doctor, and reformer (1736–1786)

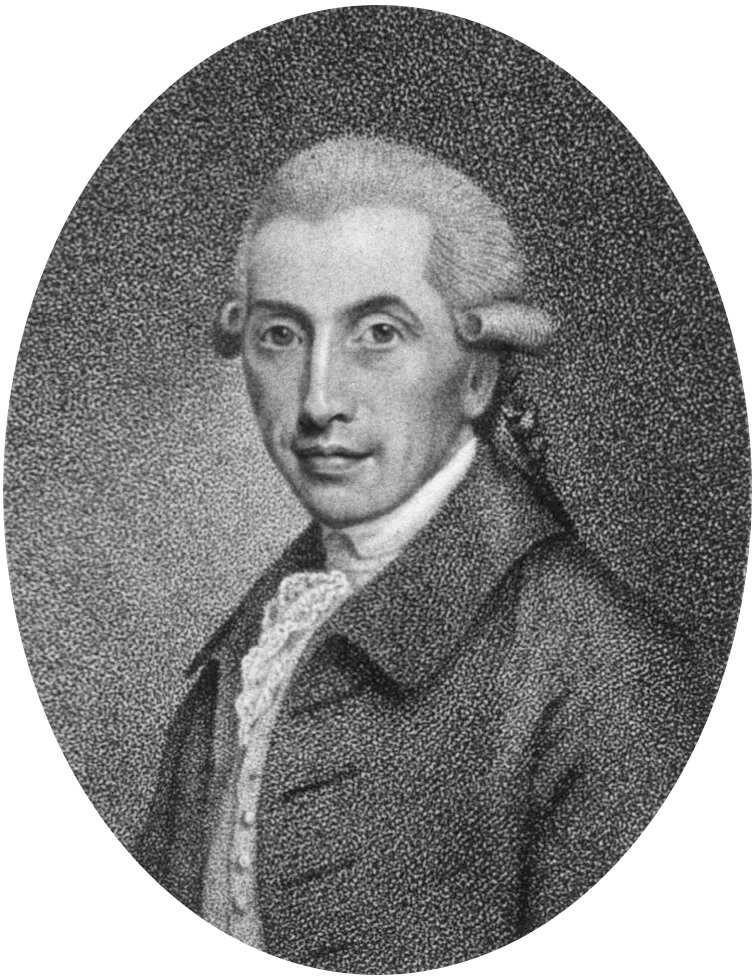
John Jebb

John Jebb (1736–1786) was an English divine, medical doctor, and religious and political reformer.

== Life ==
Jebb was the son of John Jebb, Dean of Cashel, a member of the Irish branch of a distinguished family which came originally from Mansfield in Nottinghamshire: among his Irish cousins was John Jebb, Bishop of Limerick and the bishop's brother Richard Jebb, judge of the Court of King's Bench (Ireland). His mother was Anne Gansel, daughter of David Gansel of Donnyland House, Colchester, and sister of Lieutenant General William Gansel, who was noted as the protagonist in Gansel's case (1774), on whether a lodger had a legal right to resist being evicted from his lodgings.

John Jebb was educated at Peterhouse, Cambridge, where he was elected fellow in 1761, having previously been Second Wrangler at Cambridge in 1757. He was a man of independent judgement, and he and his wife Ann warmly supported the movement of 1771 for abolishing university and clerical subscription to the Thirty-nine Articles. In his lectures on the Greek New Testament he is said to have expressed Socinian views. In 1775 he resigned his Suffolk church livings, and two years afterwards graduated M.D. at St Andrews. He practised medicine in London and was elected a fellow of the Royal Society in 1779. He and Ann continued to be involved in political reform.

== Views ==
Like Edmund Law and Francis Blackburne, he was an advocate of soul sleep.

Jebb was a keen supporter of the American Revolution. He co-founded the Society for Constitutional Information in London in 1780, and was a leading figure in the early 1780s Association movement which pioneered the campaign for parliamentary reform that was carried on by the nineteenth-century Chartists.
