= Sir Richard Jebb, 1st Baronet =

English physician

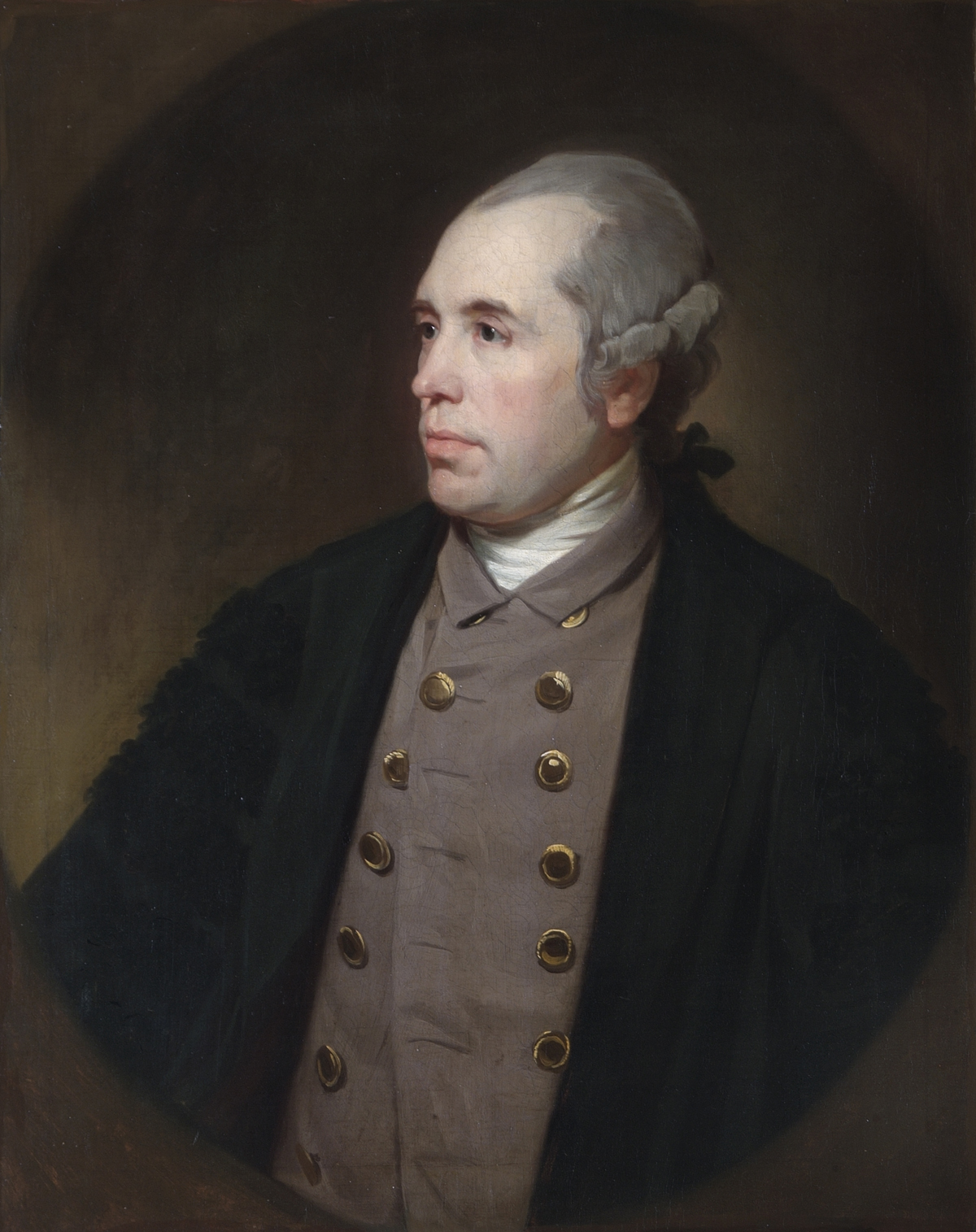
- Sir Richard Jebb, portrait by Johann Zoffany
- Baptised: 30 October 1729
- Died: 4 July 1787
- Education: St Mary Hall, Oxford; Marischal College
- Father: Samuel Jebb
- Relatives: Richard Jebb (cousin)

Sir Richard Jebb, 1st Baronet M.D. (1729–4 July 1787) was an English physician. He was noted for his success as a society doctor and royal physician.

== Life ==
The son of Samuel Jebb, he was born at Stratford, London, being baptised there on 30 October 1729. He entered at St Mary Hall, Oxford, in 1747, but as a nonjuror could not graduate, and went to Marischal College, Aberdeen, where he graduated M.D. on 23 September 1751.

Jebb took rooms in Parliament Street, London, and was admitted a licentiate of the Royal College of Physicians, on 24 March 1755. He was physician to Westminster Hospital from 1754 to 1762, when (7 May) he was elected physician to St. George's Hospital. He went to Italy to attend the Duke of Gloucester, and became a favourite of George III, who granted him a crown lease of Trent Park, 385 acres of Enfield Chase. He built a small house on it, enclosed it with a fence, and kept deer.

In 1771 Jebb was elected a fellow of the College of Physicians, and in 1774 he delivered the Harveian oration. He was censor for the College in 1772, 1776, and 1781. He was created a baronet on 4 September 1778, and was Fellow of the Royal Society and Society of Antiquaries of London.

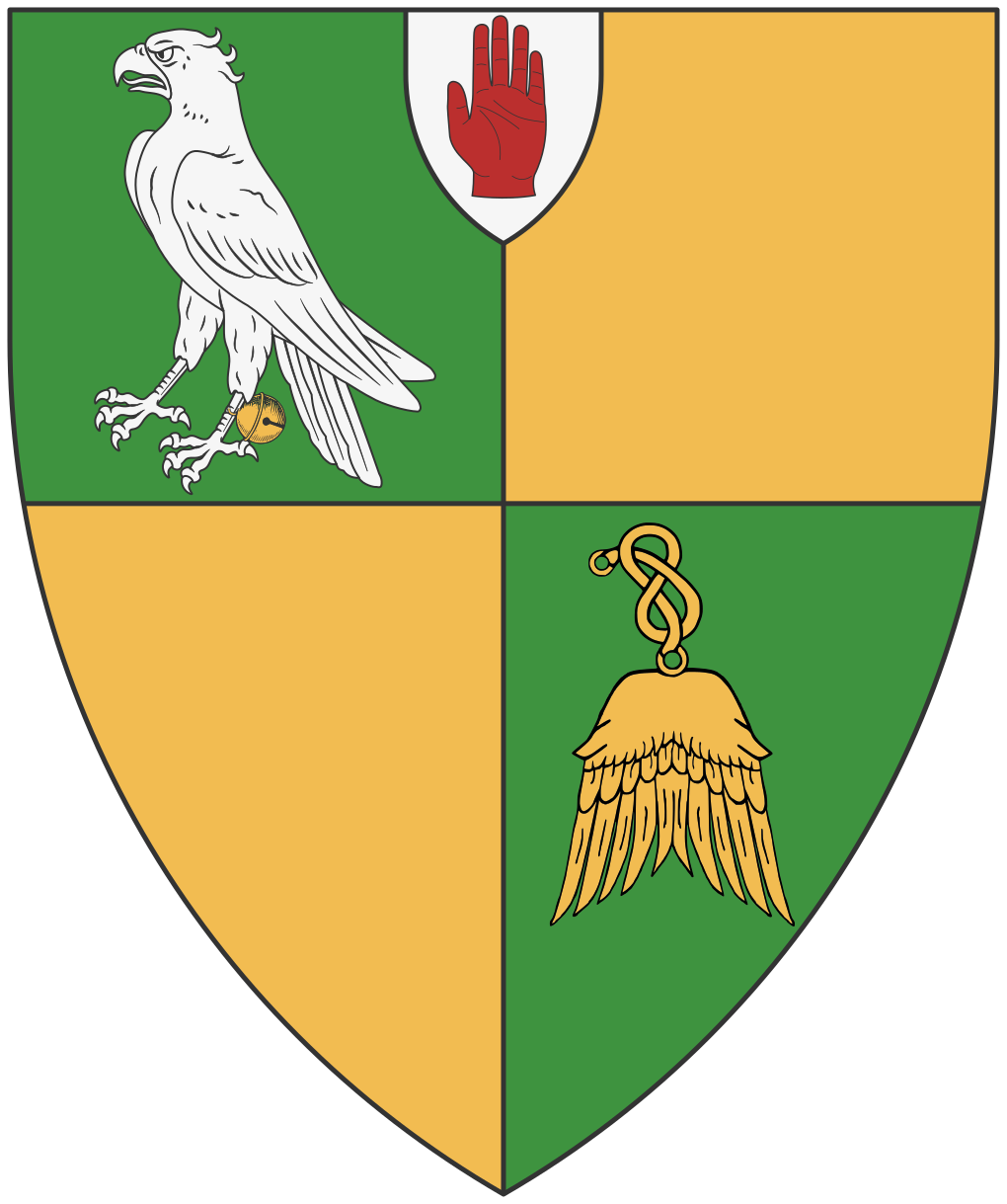
Escutcheon of the Jebb baronets of Trent Place

By 1768 Jebb had resigned his hospital appointment to concentrate on private practice, and in the three years, 1779–81, his fees amounted to twenty thousand guineas. In 1780 he was appointed physician to the Prince of Wales, and in 1786 to the king.

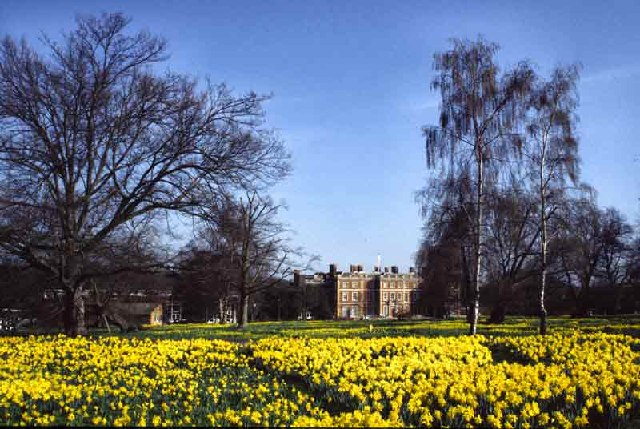
Trent Park House today

John Wilkes and Charles Churchill were among Jebb's friends, and he paid for the education of Churchill's son. John Coakley Lettsom was a critic, but his professional reputation was high.

== Death ==
In June 1787, while attending two of the princesses, Jebb was attacked by fever. He was attended by Richard Warren and Henry Revell Reynolds, but died at 2 a.m. on 4 July 1787 at his house in Great George Street, Westminster. He was buried in the west cloister of Westminster Abbey. He left much of his estate to his young Irish cousin and namesake Richard Jebb, who later became a distinguished High Court judge.

== Notes ==
Attribution

This article incorporates text from a publication now in the public domain: Lee, Sidney, ed. (1892). "Jebb, Richard". Dictionary of National Biography. Vol. 29. London: Smith, Elder & Co.

Baronetage of Great Britain
| New creation | Baronet (of Trent Place); 1778–1787 | Extinct |
| Preceded by Gunning baronets | Jebb baronets of Trent Place; 4 September 1778 | Succeeded by Lippincott baronets |
