= John Jebb (bishop) =

Irish churchman and writer

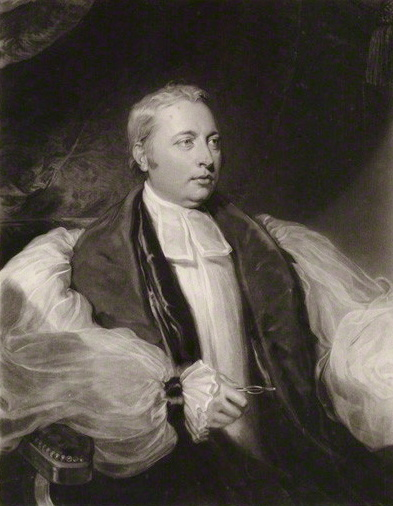
Bishop Jebb.

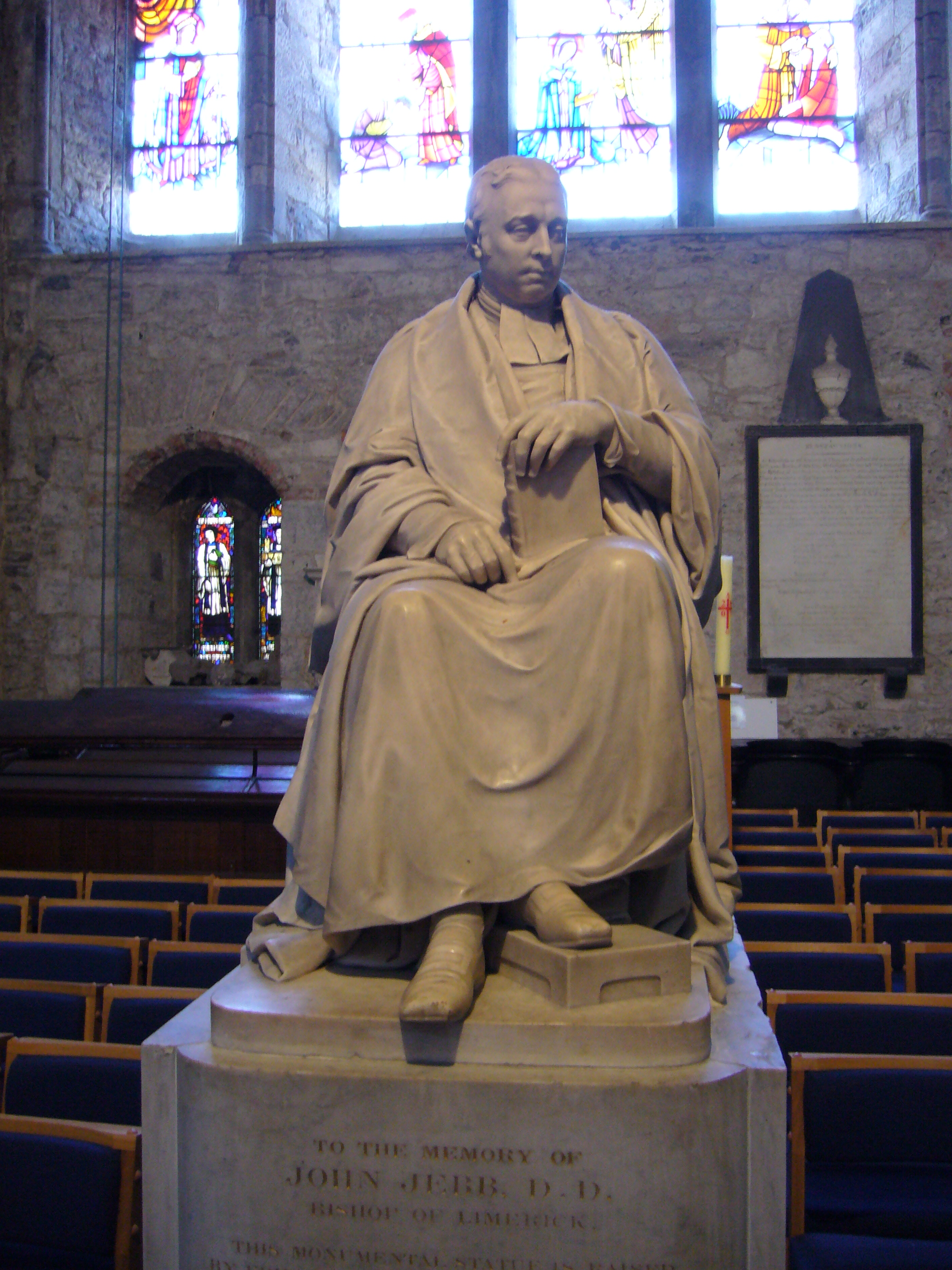
Statue of Bishop Jebb in St Mary's Cathedral, Limerick by Edward Hodges Baily

John Jebb (7 September 1775 – 9 December 1833) was an Irish churchman and writer.

== Biography ==
John Jebb was born in Drogheda, younger son of John Jebb senior, an alderman of the town of Drogheda, and his second wife Alicia Forster. His father had an estate at Leixlip in County Kildare: his grandfather Richard Jebb had come to Ireland from Nottinghamshire. His father was in reduced financial circumstances for a time, but later recovered his fortunes, and at his death in 1796 he left John £2000 He was educated at the local school in Celbridge, then at Free Grammar School, Derry where he formed a lifelong friendship with the theologian Alexander Knox, and at Trinity College Dublin.

Ordained in 1799, he became curate of Swanlinbar, County Cavan; and in 1801 of Mogorbane, County Tipperary. In 1805 he became private chaplain to Charles Brodrick, Archbishop of Cashel, and in 1809 he became rector of Abingdon, County Limerick, where his curate was Charles Forster, his lifelong friend and first biographer. He spent some time in England, where he became a friend of William Wilberforce and of Hannah More. In 1812 he was seriously injured in a carriage accident; the injuries were poorly treated by his medical advisers, and he probably never fully recovered his health.

In 1821 he became archdeacon of Emly. For his services in maintaining order in the district of Emly during the disturbances that followed the outbreak of famine in the west of Ireland in 1822, he was made Bishop of Limerick, Ardfert and Aghadoe in that year. As bishop, he is credited with raising the academic standard for candidates for holy orders: he often quoted an old saying that candidates might deceive him about their Godliness, but not about their scholarship.

In 1827 he had a stroke, which left him largely incapacitated physically, and afterwards, he spent his time in various places in England, devoting himself to writing, in particular the celebrated correspondence with his friend Alexander Knox, for which he is chiefly remembered. He favoured the High Church approach to ritual and is regarded as a forerunner of the Oxford Movement. He died unmarried in East Hill, near Wandsworth, Surrey. He was remembered as a man of great learning, and a churchman of strong convictions and broad sympathies. His close friend Charles Forster, the grandfather of novelist E. M. Forster, published his Life of John Jebb in 1836.

Richard Jebb, justice of the Court of King's Bench (Ireland) (1766-1834) was his elder brother, and a deep affection existed between the two. Richard was the father of John Jebb (1805-1886), canon in residence of Hereford Cathedral.

In character Bishop Jebb was described as a man of great generosity, candour and integrity, modest and unassuming, naturally shy and reserved in manner, but with a keen sense of humour.

== Works ==
- Sermons (London, 1815)
- Sacred Literature (1820)
- Practical Theology (2 vols., 1830)
- Biographical Memoir of William Phelan (1832)
- His correspondence with Alexander Knox was edited by C. Forster (2 vols., 1834).
- Piety without asceticism, or, The Protestant Kempis (1846)

== Bibliography ==
- Cross, F. L. (ed.) (1957) The Oxford Dictionary of the Christian Church. Oxford: U. P.; pp. 716–17
- Mozley, Anne (ed.) Letters of J. H. Newman, i. 440, 470, ib. 1890
- DNB, xxix, 259–261
