= Anglican Arminianism =

Theological position within the Church of England

Arminianism is a theological position within the Church of England that became especially prominent in the second quarter of the 17th century (during the reign of Charles I). A key element was the rejection of predestination. The Puritans fought against Arminianism, and King James I opposed it before, during, and after the Synod of Dort, 1618–1619, where the English delegates participated in formulating the Calvinist Canons of Dort; but his son Charles I favoured it, leading to deep political battles. The movement was also associated with the Caroline Divines, such as Lancelot Andrewes and William Laud, who emphasised episcopal authority and liturgical reverence. The Methodists, who espoused a variant of the school of thought called Wesleyan–Arminian theology, branched off the Church of England in the 18th century.

== Characteristics ==
The term "Arminianism" in Protestant theology refers to Jacobus Arminius, a Dutch theologian, and his Remonstrant followers, and covers his proposed revisions to Reformed theology (known as Calvinism). "Arminianism" in the English sense, however, had a broader application: to questions of church hierarchy, discipline and uniformity; to details of liturgy and ritual; and in the hands of the Puritan opponents of Laudianism, to a wider range of perceived or actual ecclesiastical policies, especially those implying any extension of central government powers over clerics. (Note: "Of the various terms which can be used to describe the thrust of religions change at the time Arminian is the least misleading. It does not mean that the Dutch theologian Jacobus Arminius was normally the source of the ideas so labelled. Rather Arminian denotes a coherent body of anti-Calvinist religious thought, which was gaining ground in various regions of early seventeenth-century Europe." Tyacke 1990, p. 245.)

While the term "Arminian" was widely used in debates of that time, and was subsequently co-opted as convenient to match later High Church views of Anglicanism, scholarly debate has not settled the exact content or historical role of English Arminianism. The Synod of Dort of 1619 in effect destroyed the political base of Dutch Arminianism. Arminian views held in England after that time are variously seen as advanced, and even disruptive of Calvinism that was quite orthodox in the Church of England by the end of the reign of Elizabeth I (a position argued by Nicholas Tyacke); or on the other hand a return to the spirit of the Elizabethan Settlement. The status of the canons of Dort in relation to the Church, and the interpretation of the Thirty-Nine Articles in the light of these and other pronouncements on Reformed theology, remained unclarified until the 1640s.

Factional struggles within the Church around bishop William Laud, supported by King Charles I, involved both ecclesiastical matters and political control of the Church. That control issue was central for the lay Parliamentary Puritans, who campaigned strongly under an anti-Arminian banner.

== Elizabethan anti-Calvinists ==
The Church of England's embrace of the Elizabethan Settlement allowed for a large-scale acceptance of Calvinist views. Such intense debates as occurred on theological points were localised, in contrast to the widespread tension over church polity.

=== Predestination ===
Peter Baro was a Huguenot Calvinist, but also close to Niels Hemmingsen, who was in the Lutheran tradition of Philipp Melanchthon that was brought to Denmark by John Macalpine (Maccabeus); Baro preached conditional predestination. A theological controversy on his teaching at Cambridge was brought to a head by William Barret. The intervention by John Whitgift led to the delineation of the Church of England's reception of Calvinist purely theological teaching in the 1595 Lambeth Articles. The Articles followed recommendations of William Whitaker, and did not advance views on ritual or discipline.

A dissident voice was Richard Thomson. But anti-Calvinism was closed down as far as discussion in print was concerned. Thomson was refused permission to print his Diatriba de amissione et intercisione gratiae, et justificationis later in the 1590s.

=== Descensus controversy ===
The third of the Thirty-Nine Articles affirmed the Harrowing of Hell. Thomas Bilson preached in favour of a literal reading of this article before the queen and at Paul's Cross in 1597; ostensibly he was aiming at the Protestant Separatist objections to this view of the descensus or descent to hell of Christ as mentioned in the Apostles Creed. After a hostile reception at Paul's Cross, Bilson was set to work by the queen on his lengthy Survey of Christs Sufferings to argue the point. In so doing he was emphasising a theological point at odds with the Genevan Catechism and Heidelberg Catechism, and so with some of the Reformed Churches, who followed Calvin's opinion that the descent was not literally meant but descriptive of Christ's sufferings on the cross. Adam Hill had brought the point to prominence in The Defence of the Article (1592), against the Scottish presbyterian Alexander Hume. The difference between literal or allegorical readings of the article remained divisive, with some figures of a moderate and conforming Puritan attitude such as Whitaker and Andrew Willet disagreeing with Bilson.

== Jacobean approaches ==
John Rainolds at the Hampton Court Conference in 1604 wished to make the Lambeth Articles interpretative of the Thirty-Nine Articles; but was headed off, and the point remained unresolved. Under James I, opposition to Arminianism became official policy, and anti-Calvinist views remained subject to effective censorship. Richard Bancroft as the first Archbishop of Canterbury chosen by James acted as an enforcer against Puritan nonconformity; George Abbot, however, who took over after Bancroft's death in 1610, was an evangelical Calvinist, and agreed with James on a solid opposition to Arminianism in the Netherlands, typified by the hounding of Conrad Vorstius and the loading of authority on the Synod of Dort as an international council of Reformed churches.

During the period from 1603 to 1625 Arminianism took shape as a Dutch religious party, became involved by successive appeals to secular authority in high politics, and was crushed. In the same period English Arminianism existed (if at all) almost unavowed on paper, and since anti-Calvinist literature was censored, had no clear form until 1624 and a definite controversy.

=== Footholds for Arminian views ===
Certain churchmen are now labelled by historians as "proto-Arminian". These include prominent bishops of the period around 1600: Lancelot Andrewes, Thomas Dove, and John Overall. Theodore K. Rabb describes Edwin Sandys, a lay politician, as proto-Arminian.

George Abbot suspected William Laud at an early stage of his career of anti-Calvinism; and attempted to block Laud's election as President of St John's College, Oxford. Laud, however, had supporters in the "moderate" group who would later emerge as the recognisable "Durham House" faction, around Richard Neile. The election of Laud was eventually allowed to stand by the king, after much intrigue. Some other heads of houses showed close acquaintance with the Dutch Arminian literature: Jerome Beale, Samuel Brooke, Matthew Wren.

=== The international Arminian conflict and the Synod of Dort ===
Opponents of Conrad Vorstius, successor to Arminius, led by Sibrandus Lubbertus, communicated with George Abbot. King James issued a pamphlet against Vorstius in 1612; he also recruited Richard Sheldon and William Warmington to write against him. Abbot had anti-Arminian works written by his brother Robert Abbot and Sebastian Benefield (In Ricardi Thomsoni Angli-Belgici diatribam, against Thomson); his reception in 1613 of Hugo Grotius, the leading Dutch Arminian intellectual, was chilly (unlike the king's). James chose to back the Huguenot Pierre Du Moulin as a theologian to unify the French Protestants, an opponent of the Arminian Daniel Tilenus, and was successful by the synod at Alès in 1620 in his aims.

The Elizabethan debate was at this time revisited, in the context of the overt religious conflicts and battle lines in the Netherlands. In 1613 Antonius Thysius published Scripta Anglicana, a collection of documents from the Cambridge disputes of the 1590s around Peter Baro. This publication was directed against Remonstrant claims that they had backing from the Church of England's doctrinal formularies; it included works by Baro, Matthew Hutton, Laurence Chaderton, Robert Some, Andrew Willet, George Estye, Whittaker, and Johann Piscator. Johannes Arnoldi Corvinus then disputed the interpretation, and pointed out that King James I had refused to put the resulting Lambeth Articles on the same footing as the Thirty-Nine Articles. Thomson's Diatriba, which had anticipated some arguments of Petrus Bertius in De sanctorum apostasia problemata duo (1610), was also finally published (Leiden, 1616), through the good offices of John Overall.

In pursuit of wider aims of Protestant reconciliation (within Calvinism, and between Calvinists and Lutherans), James I both promoted the importance of the Synod of Dort (1618) by sending a learned delegation, and approved of its conclusions. He was prepared at that point to allow the Remonstrant (Arminian) teaching to be written off as a return of Pelagianism. On the other hand, James wished the Synod's conclusions to close down the debate on the specific theological points involved: particularly on predestination. As far as his own kingdom of England was concerned, he issued instructions via George Abbot in 1622 suggesting restrictions on preaching, on the topics involved, and a moderate approach.

=== The Gagg controversy ===
In 1624, a thitherto obscure Cambridge scholar, Richard Montagu, obtained royal permission to publish A New Gagg for an Old Goose. The book was framed as a rebuttal of a Catholic critique of the Church of England. In response, Montagu argued that the Calvinist positions objected to were held only by a small, Puritan minority in the Church of England, and that the majority of clergy in the Church of England rejected high Calvinism.

== Caroline Divines and Arminianism ==
The first accusation of an Englishman of Arminianism has been dated to 1624. In a few years, the accusation of Arminianism was much used polemically against the group of theologians now known as Caroline divines. A term with a more accurate focus is Durham House group.

=== Arminianism and Laudianism ===
Laudianism, the programme of William Laud as Archbishop of Canterbury from 1633 to shape the Church of England in terms of liturgy, discipline, and polity, has only with difficulty been equated by historians with the operation of an actual Arminian faction in the Church of England. In the factional church disputes under Charles I, however, this was certainly a common accusation.

=== Liberal Arminianism ===
What has been called a "liberal" Arminianism, distinct from Laudianism, emerged in the 1630s in the circle around Lucius Cary, 2nd Viscount Falkland. Given the involvement in this group of clerics who would hold important bishoprics after 1660, most obviously Gilbert Sheldon, this strand of Arminianism has been seen as significant for the tradition of the Church of England in the longer term.

=== Hooker's Ecclesiastical Polity ===
A writer of a previous generation, Richard Hooker, was used by Laudians to supply a basis for their arguments in debate, in particular with the king. His Ecclesiastical Polity supplied arguments on justification, less individualistic than the Calvinistic norm; and these were adopted by John Cosin in his Collection of Private Devotions. On the other hand, modern scholars generally regard Hooker as a theologian within the internationalist Reformed mainstream.

=== Arminianism and absolutist views ===
David Owen from Anglesey was one "proto-Arminian" who both advocated the divine right of kings, and regarded Hooker's works as supporting it. His works were brought back into print two decades after his death in 1623. Of the two most notorious clerical supporters of royal prerogative of the reign of Charles I, Robert Sibthorpe at least had Arminian associations (with Owen and others in the diocese of Peterborough); while Roger Maynwaring did not.

== Debate on Tyacke's view ==
Tyacke's view on English Arminianism as innovative and disruptive in the early Stuart period had a significant effect on historiography: Kevin Sharpe wrote that

[...] Nicholas Tyacke's thesis on the rise of English Arminianism became the mainstay of Conrad Russell's account of the origins of the English civil war.

— Sharpe 2000, p. 347

But it also has been much contested, notably by Julian Davies who sees "Carolinism", that is Charles I and his insistence on sacramental kingship as opposed to the rule of the King-in-Parliament, as the major factor.

== Sources ==
- Armstrong, Brian G.; Larminie, Vivienne (4 October 2008). "Du Moulin, Pierre". Oxford Dictionary of National Biography (online ed.). Oxford University Press. doi:10.1093/ref:odnb/19430. (Subscription, Wikipedia Library access or UK public library membership required.)
- Bremer, Francis J.; Webster, Tom (2006). Puritans and Puritanism in Europe and America: A Comprehensive Encyclopedia. ABC-CLIO. ISBN 978-1-57607-678-1.
- Brydon, Michael (2006). The Evolving Reputation of Richard Hooker: An Examination of Responses, 1600-1714. Oxford: OUP. ISBN 978-0-19-920481-6.
- Carlyle, Edward Irving (1897). "Sheldon, Richard" . In Lee, Sidney (ed.). Dictionary of National Biography. Vol. 52. London: Smith, Elder & Co.
- Cranfield, Nicholas W. S. (28 September 2006). "Owen, David". Oxford Dictionary of National Biography (online ed.). Oxford University Press. doi:10.1093/ref:odnb/20989. (Subscription, Wikipedia Library access or UK public library membership required.)
- Davies, Julian (1992). The Caroline Captivity of the Church: Charles I and the Remoulding of Anglicanism, 1625-1641. Oxford: Clarendon Press. ISBN 978-0-19-820311-7.
- Fincham, Kenneth (3 January 2008). "Dove, Thomas". Oxford Dictionary of National Biography (online ed.). Oxford University Press. doi:10.1093/ref:odnb/7952. (Subscription, Wikipedia Library access or UK public library membership required.)
- Fincham, Kenneth (6 January 2011). "Abbot, William". Oxford Dictionary of National Biography (online ed.). Oxford University Press. doi:10.1093/ref:odnb/4. (Subscription, Wikipedia Library access or UK public library membership required.)
- Foster, Andrew (23 September 2004). "Lindsell, Augustine". Oxford Dictionary of National Biography (online ed.). Oxford University Press. doi:10.1093/ref:odnb/16721. (Subscription, Wikipedia Library access or UK public library membership required.)
- Foster, Andrew (26 May 2005). "Durham House group". Oxford Dictionary of National Biography (online ed.). Oxford University Press. doi:10.1093/ref:odnb/72182. (Subscription, Wikipedia Library access or UK public library membership required.)
- Gordon, Bruce; Marshall, Peter (2000). The Place of the Dead: Death and Remembrance in Late Medieval and Early Modern Europe. Cambridge: University Press. ISBN 978-0-521-64518-8.
- Larminie, Vivienne (3 January 2008). "Maynwaring [Manwaring], Roger (1589/90?–1653), bishop of St David's". Oxford Dictionary of National Biography (online ed.). Oxford University Press. doi:10.1093/ref:odnb/18011. (Subscription, Wikipedia Library access or UK public library membership required.)
- Lee, Sydney (1900). "Whitgift, John" . In Lee, Sidney (ed.). Dictionary of National Biography. Vol. 61. London: Smith, Elder & Co.
- MacCulloch, Diarmaid (2009). A History of Christianity: The First Three Thousand Years. Allen Lane. ISBN 978-0-7139-9869-6.
- Milton, Anthony (2002). Catholic and Reformed: The Roman and Protestant Churches in English Protestant Thought, 1600-1640. Cambridge University Press. ISBN 978-0-521-89329-9.
- Nijenhuis, Willem (1980). Adrianus Saravia (ca. 1532-1613): Dutch Calvinist, First Reformend Defender of the English Episcopal Church Order on the Basis of the Ius Divinum. BRILL. ISBN 90-04-06194-0.
- Patterson, W. B. (2000). King James VI and I and the Reunion of Christendom. Cambridge: University Press. ISBN 978-0-521-79385-8.
- Rabb, Theodore K. (2017). Jacobean Gentleman: Sir Edwin Sandys, 1561-1629. Princeton University Press. ISBN 978-1-4008-8752-1.
- Richardson, William (23 September 2004). "Bilson, Thomas". Oxford Dictionary of National Biography (online ed.). Oxford University Press. doi:10.1093/ref:odnb/2401. (Subscription, Wikipedia Library access or UK public library membership required.)
- Schwartz, Hillel (May 1973). "Arminianism and the English Parliament, 1624–1629". The Journal of British Studies. 12 (2): 41–68. doi:10.1086/385641. ISSN 0021-9371. S2CID 145503815.
- Sharpe, Kevin (2000). Remapping Early Modern England: The Culture of Seventeenth-Century Politics. Cambridge: University Press. ISBN 978-0-521-66409-7.
- Sommerville, J. P. (1986). Politics and ideology in England, 1603-1640. Longman. ISBN 9780582494329.
- Summerson, Henry (23 September 2004). "Hill, Adam". Oxford Dictionary of National Biography (online ed.). Oxford University Press. doi:10.1093/ref:odnb/13266. (Subscription, Wikipedia Library access or UK public library membership required.)
- Moore, Jonathan D. (3 January 2008). "Thomson, Richard". Oxford Dictionary of National Biography (online ed.). Oxford University Press. doi:10.1093/ref:odnb/27320. (Subscription, Wikipedia Library access or UK public library membership required.)
- Tyacke, Nicholas (1990). Anti-Calvinists: the rise of English Arminianism, c. 1590-1640. Oxford: Clarendon. ISBN 978-0-19-820184-7.
- Tyacke, Nicholas (2001). Aspects of English Protestantism C. 1530-1700. Manchester: University Press. ISBN 978-0-7190-5392-4.
- White, Peter (2002). Predestination, Policy and Polemic: Conflict and Consensus in the English Church from the Reformation to the Civil War. Cambridge: University Press. ISBN 978-0-521-89250-6.
