= Antonius Thysius the Elder =

Dutch Reformed theologian and professor

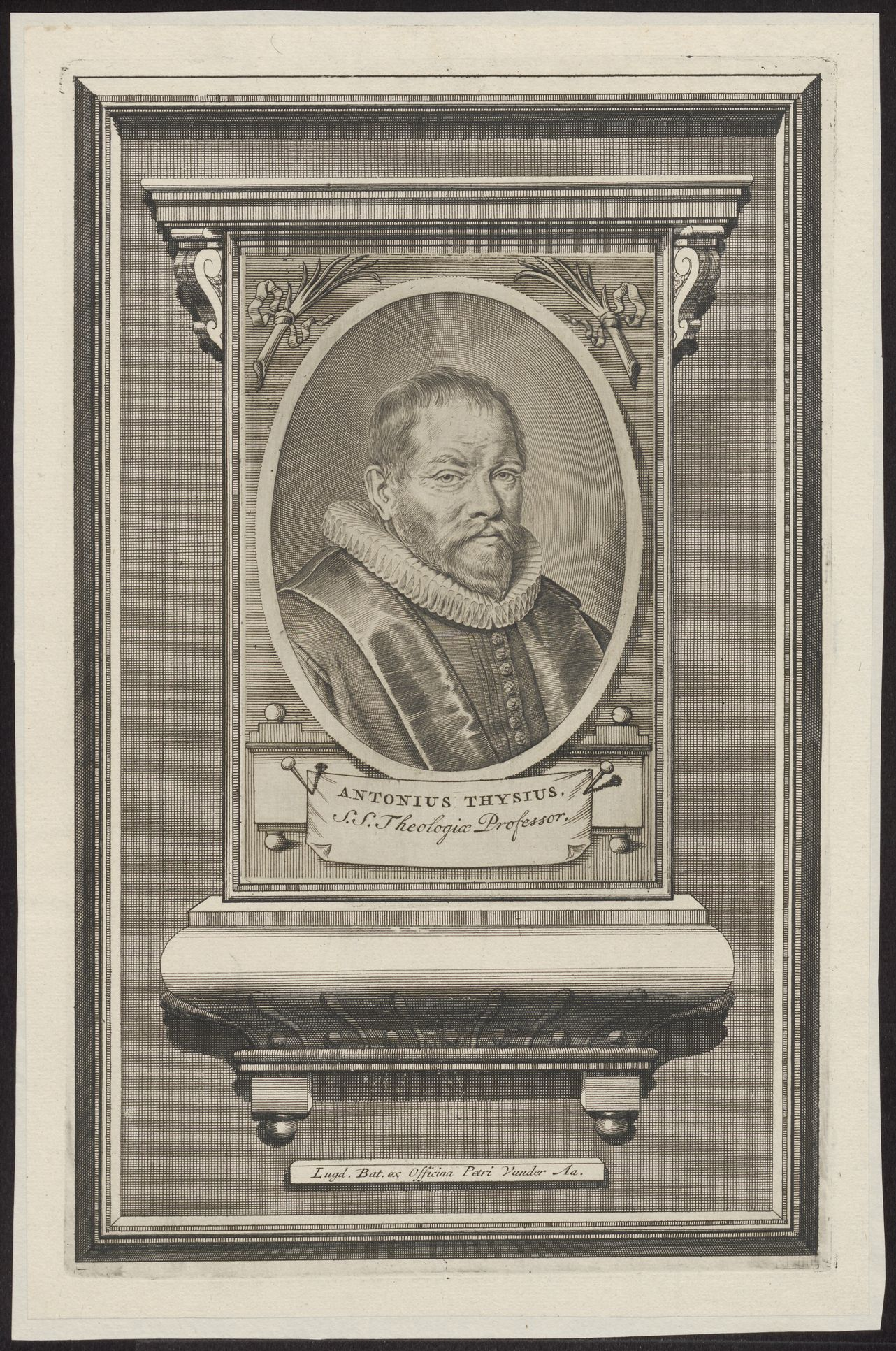
Antonius Thysius, 1720 engraving

Antonius Thysius (Dutch: Thys, Thijs; 1565–1640) was a Dutch Reformed theologian, professor at the University of Harderwijk and University of Leiden.

== Life ==
He was born on 9 August 1565 in Antwerp, and received a classical education under Bonaventura Vulcanius. In 1581 he followed his teacher to Leiden, where he studied theology under Lambertus Danaeus; Danaeus left for Ghent after a year, and Thysius spent some years travelling, to Frankenthal, Geneva where he was taught by Theodore Beza, then other Swiss cities, and Strasbourg. He was for four years in Heidelberg, and in 1589 went on to England, where he heard in Oxford and Cambridge William Whitaker and John Rainolds. On 12 August 1590 he returned to Leiden and briefly lectured in Haarlem. There his father's death called him to Frankfurt.

Then for a time Thysius travelled through northern Germany visiting scholars: Danzig, Rostock, Stade, Emden and to Groningen. In 1594 coming to Amsterdam, he worked as assistant preacher, but then again set off, this time to France. After several years away, particularly in Montpellier and Toulouse, he returned in 1600 to Leiden. There he renewed earlier friendships with Franciscus Gomarus, Lucas Trelcatius, Franciscus Junius the Elder, Scaliger and Franciscus Raphelengius.

With a recommendation from Gomarus, Thysius in 1601 was recruited for the theological faculty at the University of Harderwijk, where he remained for 18 years as a moderate Calvinist teacher; though opposed to Jacobus Arminius, he did not follow the hardline Gomarists. At the 1618 Synod of Dort he was among the theological delegates, and appointed an examiner of the Bible translation and of Old Testament. Shortly after the Synod he received from the Curators of Leiden University a call as a professor for theology and began this post on 10 December 1619 with his Oratio de theologia ejusque studios capessendo.

He died on 7 November 1640 in Leiden.

== Works ==
In 1613 Thysius edited Scripta Anglicana, a collection of documents from the Cambridge disputes of the 1590s, around Peter Baro. This publication was directed against Remonstrant claims that they had backing from the Church of England's doctrinal formularies; it included works by Baro, Matthew Hutton, Laurence Chaderton, Robert Some, Andrew Willet, George Estye, William Whitaker, and Johann Piscator. Johannes Arnoldi Corvinus then disputed the interpretation, and pointed out that James I had refused to put the resulting Lambeth Articles on the same footing as the Thirty-Nine Articles. Other works by Thysius from this tense period were Duyt as Wael Gereformeerden Kercken in een ligchaem vervat (1615) and Responsio in Remonstrantium remonstrantiam (1617).

With Johannes Polyander, André Rivet and Antonius Walaeus, he published in 1625 a Synopsis purioris theologiae, long in use in the university. He wrote also De natura Dei et divinis attributis (1625).

== Family ==
In Harderwijk in 1602 Thysius married Johanna de Raadt. Their son Anthony Thysius the Younger (1603?–1665) was from 1637 professor of poetry at the university, and later state historiographer in place of Daniel Heinsius.

Constantine L'Empereur married Catherine Thys, niece of Thysius; and his brother married one Thysius's daughters.
