= Reformed theology in the Church of England =

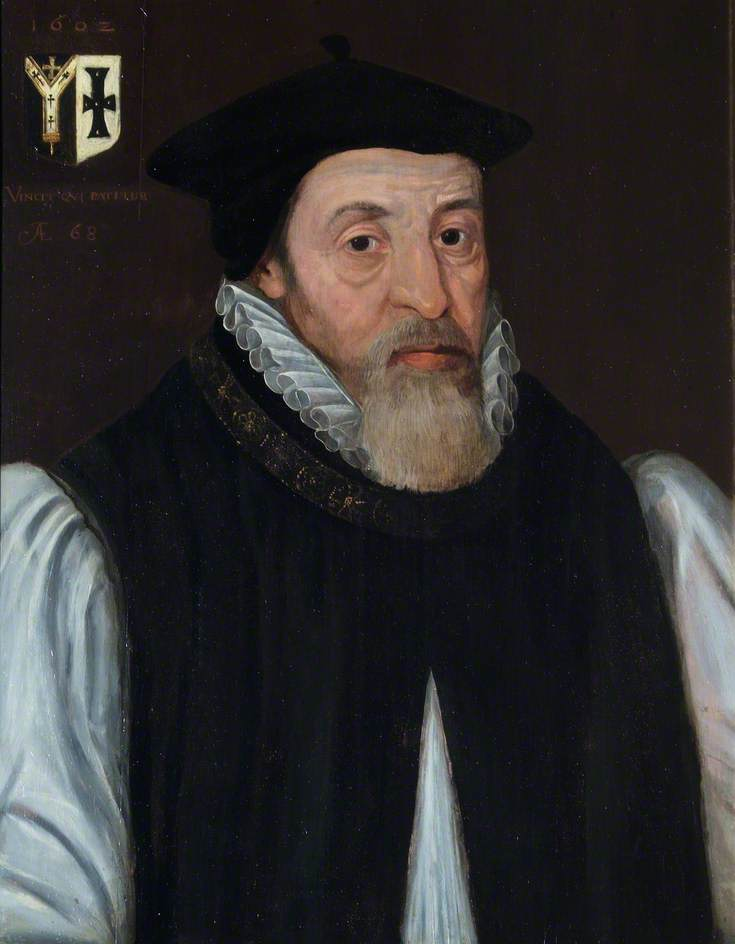
Archbishop John Whitgift of Canterbury, a prominent Calvinist

Calvinism in the Church of England refers to the predominant influence of Reformed theology within the Church of England in the late sixteenth and most of the seventeenth century, with roots in the English Reformation and continuing influence beyond the seventeenth century. During the reign of Elizabeth I, many leading bishops and theologians embraced Calvinist doctrines, particularly on predestination, creating what historians have called a "Calvinist consensus". This consensus was expressed in the Thirty-nine Articles, especially Article 17, and in the Lambeth Articles of 1595, though the latter were never officially authorised by the crown.

In the early seventeenth century, Calvinism shaped the outlook of much of the English clergy and Puritan movement, but it was increasingly challenged by Arminian and Laudian currents within Anglicanism. The resulting conflicts contributed to the English Civil War, during which the Westminster Assembly produced the Westminster Confession of Faith as a systematic Calvinist confession more clearly Calvinist than the Thirty-nine Articles. After the Stuart Restoration and the 1662 Act of Uniformity, Calvinist ministers who could not conform to the Book of Common Prayer and bishops were expelled in the Great Ejection, marking the emergence of English Nonconformism.

Although Calvinism ceased to dominate the Church of England after 1662, elements of Reformed theology continued to influence Anglican thought, especially among Evangelicals in the eighteenth century.

== Elizabethan Settlement ==
During the reign of Edward VI, Henry VIII's son, the Forty-two Articles were written in 1552 under the direction of the Archbishop Thomas Cranmer, who was moderately Calvinist (although that term was not widespread in Cranmer's lifetime.) These articles were never put into action, owing to Edward VI's death and the reversion of the English Church to Catholicism under Henry VIII's elder daughter, Mary I.

The Elizabethan Settlement of 1559 established the doctrinal and liturgical framework of the reformed Church of England and proved decisive for the place of Calvinism within Anglicanism. While the Act of Uniformity 1559 restored the Book of Common Prayer and retained traditional structures such as bishops, the Thirty-nine Articles of 1563 reflected a Calvinist consensus among leading clergy. The Elizabethan Thirty-Nine Articles affirmed a number of Calvinist views, , especially Article 17 on predestination, although also borrowing some Lutheran language. The Settlement thus produced a church that was doctrinally aligned with continental Protestantism while liturgically more conservative, described by contemporaries as “but halfly reformed.”

The Lambeth Articles of were nine doctrinal statements on predestination drawn up in 1595 at Lambeth Palace under the direction of Archbishop of Canterbury John Whitgift and primarily authored by William Whitaker. The Articles affirmed a strongly Calvinist position, including doctrines of election, reprobation, and the perseverance of the saints, and were endorsed by leading bishops; however, Queen Elizabeth I refused to authorise them, fearing increased division within the church. As a result, the Articles never gained official status in England, although they were later adopted by the Church of Ireland in 1615 and influenced the development of Reformed confessions such as the Canons of Dort.

=== Rise of the Puritans ===
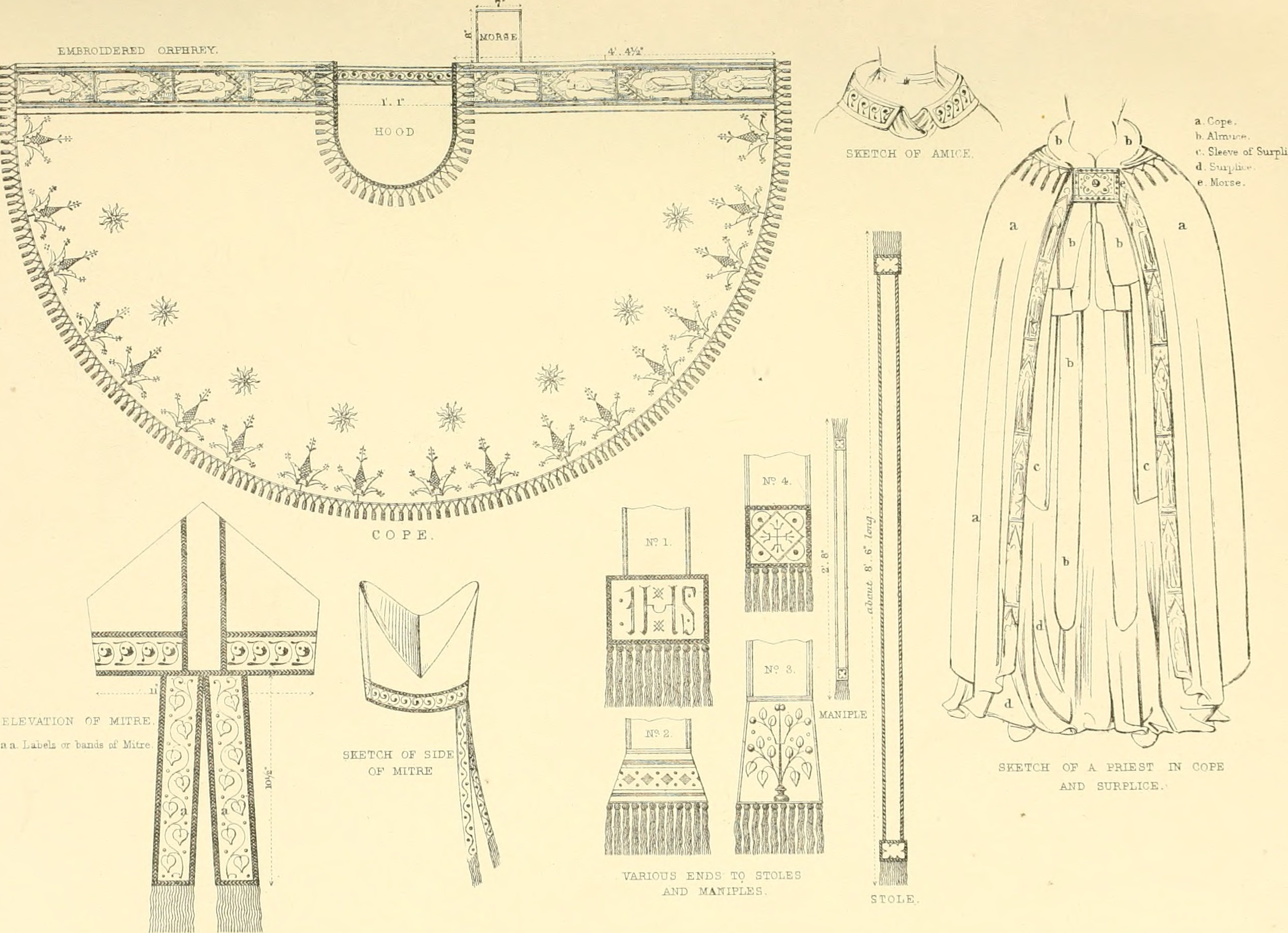
Church of England vestments depicted in the late 19th century

There was a Puritan reaction within Anglicanism that although in the reign of Elizabeth I aimed mostly at perceived retained Catholic practices in worship (many of which were in Cathedrals). As with Lutheranism, the Church of England retained more elements of Catholicism such as bishops and vestments, than any other part of the Reformed world. It was thus sometimes being called "but halfly Reformed" or a middle way between Lutheranism and Reformed Christianity, being closer liturgically to the former and theologically aligned with the latter. Beginning in the 17th century, Anglicanism broadened to the extent that Reformed theology is no longer the sole dominant theology of Anglicanism.

== The Stuarts ==
=== Early Stuarts ===
When James I, who was already king of Presbyterian Scotland and raised a Calvinist, arrived in London to take become King of England, the Puritan clergy presented him with the Millenary Petition, allegedly signed by a thousand English clergy, to abolish items such as wedding rings as "outward badges of Popish errours". James, however, equated English Puritans with Scottish Presbyterians and, after banning religious petitions, told the Hampton Court Conference of 1604 that he preferred the status quo with the monarch ruling the church through the bishops saying that if bishops were put out of power, "I know what would become of my supremacy, No bishop, no King. When I mean to live under a presbytery I will go to Scotland again.

During the reign of Charles I (1625–1649), Calvinist influence within the Church of England became closely associated with the Puritans, who opposed the rise of Laudianism and what they regarded as a drift toward Arminianism and Catholic practices, with both petitions and riots. Many Calvinist clergy and laypeople supported the Parliamentarians during the English Civil War, and under Puritan dominance the Westminster Assembly (1643–1653) produced the Westminster Confession of Faith, which is still treated as a systematic statement of Reformed Christianity by Calvinist churches, intended to replace the Thirty-nine Articles.

=== Restoration ===
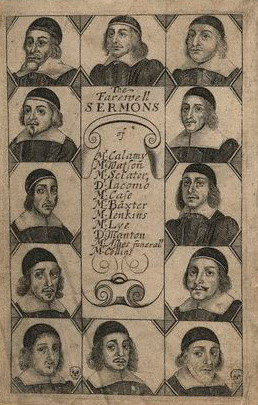
Title page of a collection of Farewell Sermons preached by ministers ejected from their parishes in the Great Ejection of 1662

Following the Stuart Restoration of 1660, the Act of Uniformity 1662 forced conformity to episcopal structures and the Book of Common Prayer, leading to the Great Ejection from the national church of around 2,500 Calvinist-leaning ministers who could not subscribe to the restored order. Many of these clergy and their congregations became Dissenters, forming the basis of the nonconformist traditions of Presbyterians, Congregationalists, and Baptists, all of which retained strong Calvinist theological commitments.

Within the Church of England itself, Calvinism did not entirely disappear after 1662. Some theologians and clergy remained committed to Reformed doctrines, even as Arminian and Laudian currents gained prominence. The "Reformed Anglicans" of the Restoration period articulated opposition to Arminianism and defended Calvinist understandings of predestination and grace into the late Stuart period. Some Calvinist theological positions remained embedded within Anglican confessional identity through the continued authority of the Thirty-nine Articles.

The rise of Evangelical Anglicanism in the eighteenth century revived aspects of Calvinist teaching, most notably in the preaching of George Whitefield, whose Calvinist theology distinguished him from the Wesleyan Methodists associated with John Wesley.

== Sources ==
- Croft, Pauline (2004). King James. Basingstoke and New York: Palgrave Macmillan. ISBN 0-333-61395-3.
- Elwell, Walter A. (May 2001). Evangelical Dictionary of Theology. Baker Academic. ISBN 978-0-8010-2075-9.
- Hampton, Stephen (29 May 2008). Anti-Arminians: The Anglican Reformed Tradition from Charles II to George I. Oxford University Press. p. 4. ISBN 978-0-19-155985-3.
- Haigh, Christopher (2006). "The English Reformations and the Making of the Anglican Church" (PDF). Archived from the original (PDF) on 6 April 2024.
- MacCulloch, Diarmaid (2009). A History of Christianity: The First Three Thousand Years. Allen Lane. ISBN 978-0-7139-9869-6.
- Milton, Anthony (9 May 2002). Catholic and Reformed: The Roman and Protestant Churches in English Protestant Thought, 1600-1640. Cambridge University Press. ISBN 978-0-521-89329-9.
- Noll, Mark A. (2010). The Rise of Evangelicalism: The Age of Edwards, Whitefield and the Wesleys. History of Evangelicalism. Vol. 1. Leicester: Inter-Varsity Press. ISBN 978-0830838912.
- Wedgwood, C. V. (1966). The King's Peace: 1637–1641. London: C. Nicholls.
- Wedgwood, C. V. (1970). The King's War: 1641–1647. London: Fontana.
- White, Peter (1992). Predestination, Policy and Polemic: Conflict and Consensus in the English Church from the Reformation to the Civil War. Cambridge: Cambridge University Press. doi:10.1017/CBO9780511520266. ISBN 9780521892506.
- Willson, David Harris (1967) [1956]. King James VI & I. London: Jonathan Cape Ltd. ISBN 0-224-60572-0.
