= Peter Baro =

Peter Baro (1534–1599) was a French Huguenot minister who served in England. He was ordained by John Calvin, but later became a critic of some Calvinist theological positions. His views in relation to the Lambeth Articles cost him his position as Lady Margaret's Professor of Divinity at the University of Cambridge. He was a forerunner of views, to be called Arminian or Laudian, which became more common a generation later in England.

== Life ==
He was born December 1534 at Étampes, near Paris. He was son of Stephen Baro and his wife Philippa Petit.

He entered the University of Bourges, where he took his degree as bachelor in the faculty of civil law on 9 April 1556. In the following year he was admitted and sworn an advocate in the court of the Parliament of Paris.

In December 1560 he moved to Geneva, and was admitted to the ministry by Calvin. Returning to France he married, at Gien. Guillemette, the daughter of Stephen Bourgoin, and Lopsa Dozival, his wife. He emigrated to England, where he was befriended by Lord Burghley, who as chancellor of the university of Cambridge, exercised his influence on Baro's behalf. He was admitted a member of Trinity College where John Whitgift was then master. The Provost of King's College, Roger Goad, engaged him to read lectures in divinity and Hebrew. In 1574, through the influence mainly of Burghley and Andrew Perne, he was chosen Lady Margaret professor of divinity. In 1576 he was created D.D., and was incorporated in the same degree at Oxford on 11 July.

A series of complaints against him in 1581 show that he was already inclining to anti-Calvinism, and was prepared to advocate tolerance even of Catholicism. Between Laurence Chaderton there arose a controversy; and by Chaderton's biographer William Dillingham, Baro is accused of having imported new doctrines into England. Whitgift warned Baro not to attack the Lambeth Articles (possibly too late); but Baro did that on 12 January 1596 in Great St. Mary's. Baro was cited before the vice-chancellor and heads, required to produce the manuscript of his sermon, and forbidden further discussion of the doctrine involved in the Lambeth Articles. Burghley supported Baro, as did John Overall, Lancelot Andrewes, and Samuel Harsnett; but Baro was not renewed in his chair in November. He went to London, and John Jegon failed to have him return to teach Hebrew; Baro made it clear in writing to Niels Hemmingsen in April 1596 that he felt he had little leeway in expressing his own theological views. He died in April 1599, and Richard Bancroft, bishop of London, gave him an imposing funeral.

== Works ==
Baro's principal published writings were:

- 'Praelectiones' on the Prophet Jonas, edited by Osmund Lake, of King's College, London, 1579; this volume also contains 'Conciones ad Clerum' and 'Theses' maintained in the public schools.
- 'De Fide ejusque Ortu et Natura plana ac dilucida Explicatio,' also edited by Osmund Lake, and by him dedicated to Sir Francis Walsingham, London, 1580.
- 'De Praestantia et Dignitate Divinae Legis libri duo,' London, n. d.
- 'A specially Treatise of God's Prouidence,' &c., together with certain sermons ad clerum and 'Quaestiones' disputed in the schools; Englished by I. L. (John Ludham), vicar of Wethersfielde, London, n. d. and 1590.
- 'Summa Trium de Praedestinatione Sententiarum,' with notes, &c., by John Piscator, Francis Junius, and William Whitaker, Hardrov, 1613 (reprinted in 'Praestantium ac Eruditorum Virorum Epistolae Ecclesiasticae et Theologicae,' 1704).

His 'Orthodox Explanation' of the Lambeth Articles (a translation of the Latin original in Trin. Coll. Lib. Camb., B. 14, 9) is printed in Strype's 'Whitgift,' App. 201.
