= Estye =

Estye is a surname. Notable people with the surname include:

- George Estye (1566–1601), English divine
- Mary Estye, victim of the Salem witch trials
