= Andrew Willet =

English clergyman and controversialist

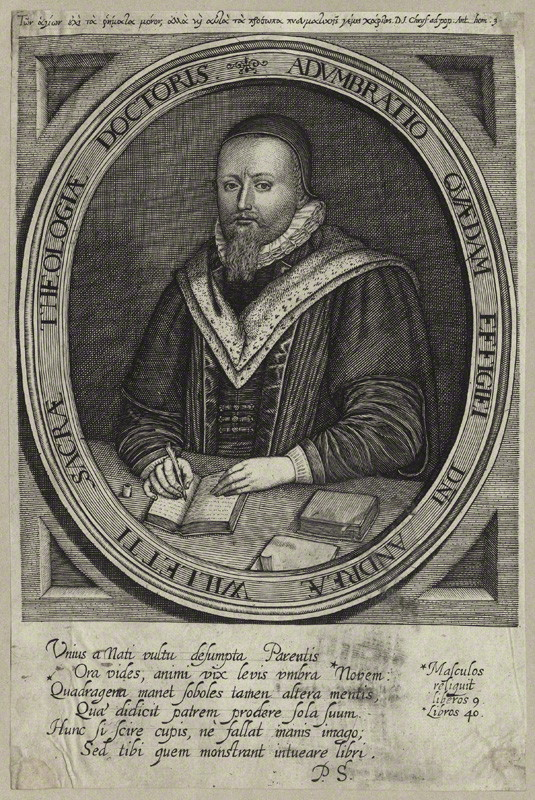

Andrew Willet (14 May 1562 – 4 December 1621) was an English clergyman and controversialist. A prolific writer, he is known for his anti-papal works. His views were conforming and non-separatist, and he appeared as a witness against Edward Dering before the Star-chamber. Joseph Hall (who knew him well) eulogised Willet in Noah's Dove, and Thomas Fuller modelled 'the Controversial Divine' of his Holy State on him.

== Life ==
He was born at Ely in 1562, son of Thomas Willet (1511?–1598), who began his career as a public notary, and later in life he took holy orders, becoming rector of Barley, Hertfordshire, fourteen miles from Cambridge and admitted to a prebendal of Ely by his patron, Bishop Richard Coxe, with whom he had been associated as sub-almoner to Edward VI.

Andrew had one brother and four sisters. After attending the collegiate school at Ely, he entered Cambridge University, matriculating at the age of fifteen (20 June 1577); he first went to Peterhouse, the master of which was Andrew Perne, his godfather, but in the same year moved to Christ's College, Cambridge. He was quickly elected a scholar, graduated B.A. in 1581, was elected to a fellowship at Christmas 1583 (aged twenty-one), proceeded M.A. in 1584, and in the same year was incorporated a member of the university of Oxford. He was B.D. in 1591, and D.D. 1601. Among the fellows of Christ's, he was on good terms with George Downham, and when Willet spent his vacations at his father's rectory of Barley, he was often accompanied by Downham. He took holy orders in 1585, and was admitted on 22 July 1587, on the presentation of the queen, to the prebendal stall at Ely, which his father had resigned in his favour.

In 1588 Willet left the university, and at Michaelmas, on his marriage with Jacobine, a daughter of his father's friend Roger Goad, provost of King's, gave up his fellowship. He earned a reputation as a preacher of power, especially against the Catholics. He was selected to read the lecture for three years in Ely Cathedral, and for one year in St. Paul's Cathedral, London. In the same year he was presented to the rectory of Childerly in Cambridgeshire. This living he held till 1594. He was admitted in 1597 to the rectory of Gransden Parva in Huntingdonshire, but almost immediately moved, by exchange to Barley, his father having died in April 1598 in his eighty-eighth year. He was instituted on 29 January 1599. He spent most of his ministerial life at Barley, being rector for twenty-three years. Willet's village preaching is preserved in his Thesaurus Ecclesiae (an exposition of St. John xvii.), which contains the substance of afternoon lectures addressed to his parishioners. Willet persuaded Andrew Perne to leave by will an annual sum to the poor scholars of the free school founded in the village of Barley by Archbishop William Warham when rector; he also influenced his friend Thomas Sutton, founder of Charterhouse School.

He was chaplain-in-ordinary and tutor to Henry Frederick, Prince of Wales, as well as a frequent preacher before the court. Willet got into trouble over the Spanish match, to which he was strongly opposed. Under care of Sir John Higham of Bury St. Edmunds he sent letters and arguments to the justices of Norfolk and Suffolk, urging them to protest against the marriage. Willet himself presented a copy of his arguments to the king, and, thereby incurring his high displeasure, was committed to prison under the custody of Dr. White. He appears to have been released after a month.

Towards the close of his life he was admitted (19 Jan 1613) to the rectory of Reed, Hertfordshire, a parish adjoining that of Barley; but he only held it something over two years, resigning in favour of his eldest son, Andrew, who was admitted on 10 November 1615. The year before his death he was presented to the rectory of the small parish of Chishill Parva, across the border in Essex.

Willet's death was the result of an accident. On his return home from London his horse threw him near Hoddesdon. His leg was broken and was set badly. Ten days later he died at the inn to which he had been taken (4 December 1621), in his fifty-ninth year. On 8 December he was buried in the chancel of Barley parish church. An effigy and brass were placed by his parishioners and friends over the place of burial. The effigy showed a priest, full-length, dressed in his doctor's robes, with square cap, ruff, and scarf, and wearing a beard.

== Works ==
Willet published his major work, the Synopsis Papismi, in 1594, adding the Tetrastylon two years later. It was designed as a reply to Bellarmine, whom he seeks to confute the latter by an appeal to "scriptures, fathers, councils, imperial constitutions, pontifical decrees, their own writers and our martyrs, and the consent of all Christian churches in the world". He affirms that the church of England approves the first four ecumenical councils, and possibly the fifth; and he maintains the position of John Jewel on episcopacy. He argues strenuously against the mass, and inveighs against the mediaeval practice of regarding the mass as a vicarious and solitary sacrifice, at each celebration, of the one atoning death, but always holds "that Christ is present with all His benefits in the sacrament, that the elements of bread and wine are not bare and naked signs of the body and blood of Christ".

One of his earlier works was a century of Sacred Emblems (printed about 1591) in Latin, with English rendering. A rare book now, it was popular and may have influenced John Bunyan in the imagery to be found in Pilgrim's Progress. Other productions of Willet were mainly passing contributions to contemporary questions of the hour. Several of his works were translated into Dutch.

In Latin:

- De animae natura et viribus questiones quaedam; partim ex Aristotelis scriptis decerptae, partim ex vera philosophia id est rationis thesauris depromptae in usum Cantabrigiensium, Cambridge, 1585.

In Latin and English:

- De universali et novissima Judaeorum vocatione Cambridge, 1590.
- Sacrorum emblematum centuria una, Cambridge, circa 1591.
- De Conciliis.
- De universali gratia.
- De gratia generi humano in primo parento collata, de lapsu Adami, peccato originali, 1609.
- Epithalamium.
- Funebres concionies.
- Apologias Serenissimi Regis defensio.
- Roberti Bellarmini de lapsu Adami, peccato originali, praedestinatione, gratia, et libero arbitrio libri, refutati ab Andrea Willeto, Leyden, 1618.

In English:

- Synopsis Papismi, or a General View of Papistrie, 1594; 2nd edit, 1600; 3rd edit. 1614; 4th edit. 1630; 6th edit. 1634 (a thick folio of over 1300 pages); new edition, in 10 vols., edited by John Cumming, London, 1852.
- Hexapla upon Genesis, London, 1595, 2nd edit. 1608.
- Tetrastylon Papismi, or Four Principal Pillars of Papistrie; supplement to Synopsis, 1596; afterwards bound up with folio editions of the Synopsis.
- A Catholicon: Exposition of St. Jude, 1602; Cambridge, 1614.
- A Relection, or Discourse of a False Relection (defence of Synopsis' and 'Tetrastylon), London, 1603.
- An Antilogie or Counterplea to an Apologicall (he should have said) Apologeticall Epistle, London, 1603.
- Harmonie upon 1 Samuel, Cambridge, 1607.
- Hexapla upon Exodus, London, 1608.
- Hexapla upon Daniel, 1610.
- Hexapla upon Romans, Cambridge, 1611.
- Ecclesia Triumphans (on Coronation of James I) : Exposition of 122 Psalm, 2nd edit. Cambridge, 1614.
- Harmonie upon 1 and 2 Samuel, Cambridge, 1614.
- Thesaurus Ecclesiae: Exposition of St. John xvii., Cambridge, 1614.
- Hexapla upon Leviticus, London, 1631.
- King James his Judgment by way of Counsell, &c.; extracted from his speeches, 1642.

The following are undated:

- Limbomastix: an Answer to Richard Parkes of Brazen-nose College. In the Descensus controversy, against Richard Parkes.
- Epithalamium in English, by the author of Limbomastix.
- Laedoromastix. Against Parkes.
- Funeral Sermons in English.
- An English Catechisme.
- Catalogue of Charitable Works done within space of 60 years (reigns of Edward, Elizabeth, and James); bound up with fifth edition of Synopsis.

== Family ==
Of his eighteen children, nine sons and four daughters survived him. His widow was buried in 1637 by his side. His son, Henry Willet (died 1670), who lost a fortune by his loyalty to the king, was apparently ancestor of Ralph Willett. A special licence was granted to another son, Paul, in 1630, for a reprint of the Synopsis Papismi. The fourth son, Thomas Willet, was the first mayor of New York.
