= Lambeth Articles =

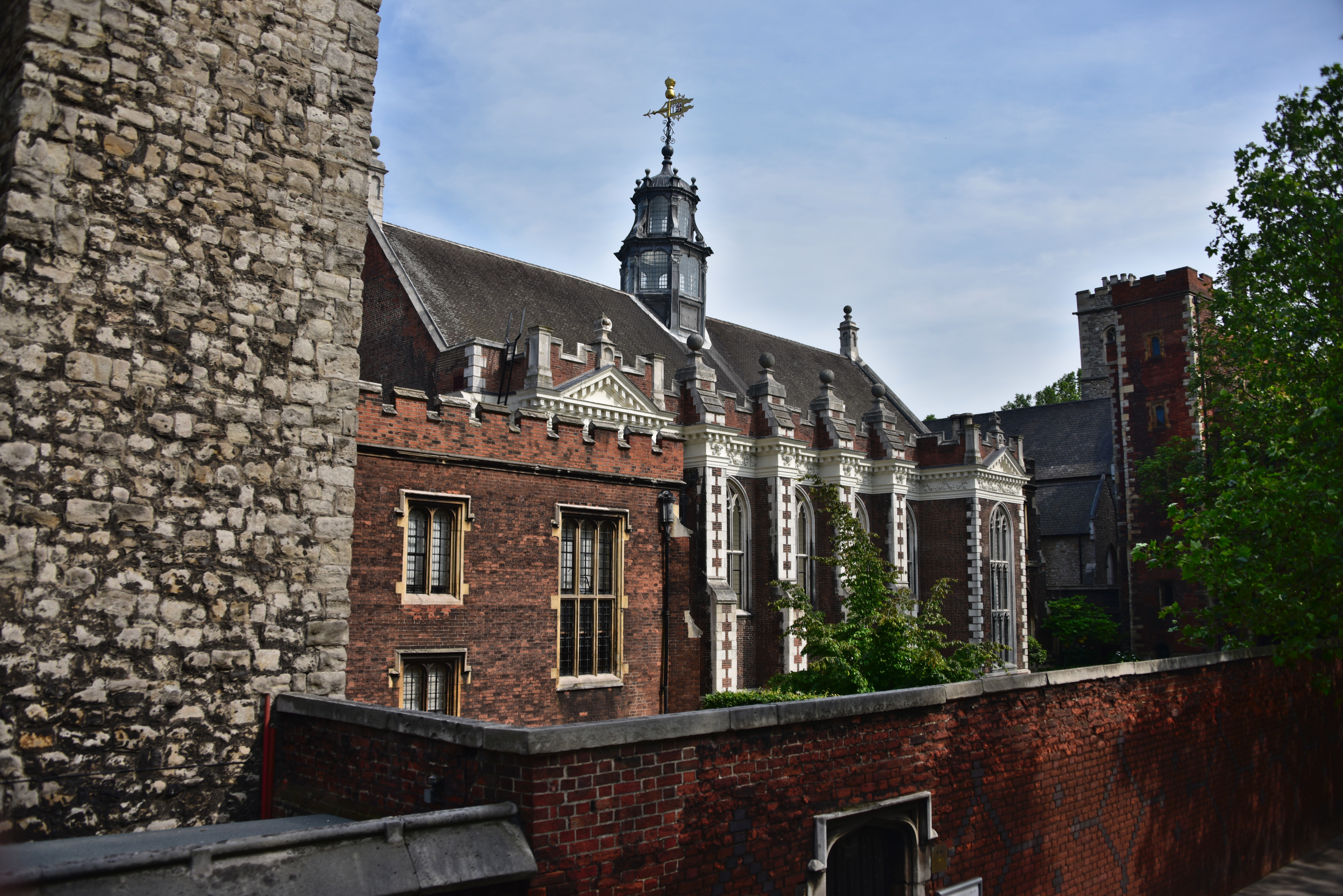
Lambeth Palace, the location of the signing of the Lambeth Articles

The Lambeth Articles of 1595 were nine doctrinal statements on the topic of predestination proposed by the bishops of the Church of England. At the time, there was controversy between Calvinists and non-Calvinists over predestination, and the Lambeth Articles were written to clarify the church's official teaching. William Whitaker, an eminent Reformed theologian, served as the primary author.

The Church of England's bishops endorsed the Lambeth Articles, but Queen Elizabeth I refused to authorise them. As a result, they never went into effect in England. However, the articles were adopted by the Church of Ireland in 1615.

== Predestination controversy ==
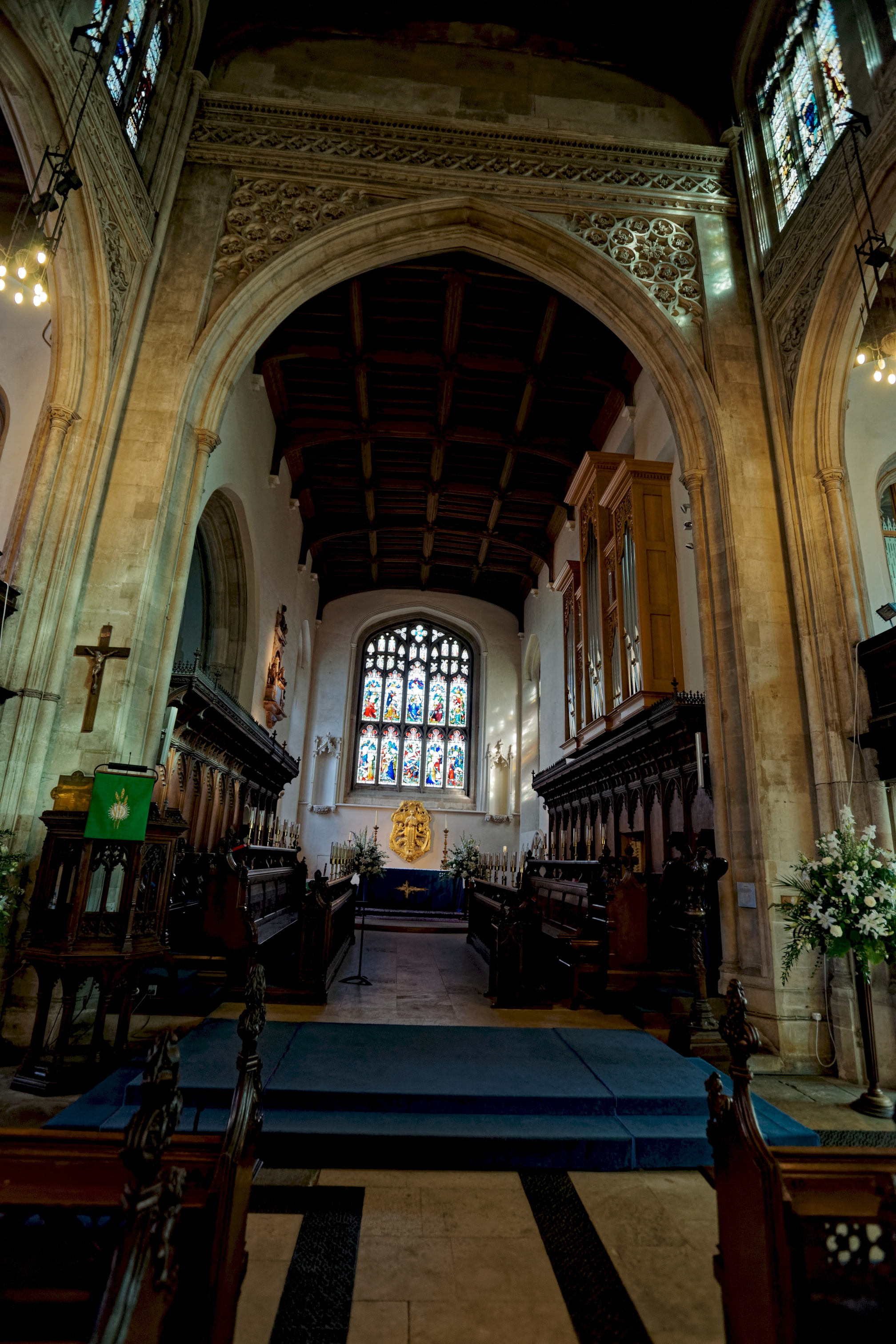
Great St Mary's, Cambridge, location of William Barret's controversial sermon

During the reign of Elizabeth I (1558–1603), a Calvinist consensus developed among the leading clergy within the Church of England, specifically in regards to the doctrine of predestination. The church's doctrinal statement, the Thirty-nine Articles, addressed predestination in Article 17 ("Of Predestination and Election"). While Calvinists believed in double predestination (that God predestined some people for salvation but others for reprobation), Article 17 only endorsed election to salvation.

The University of Cambridge was a Calvinist stronghold and notable Calvinist professors included Thomas Cartwright, William Perkins, and William Whitaker. There was an Arminian minority (notably William Barret, Peter Baro, John Overall and Antonio del Corro), influenced by the teachings of Dutch theologian Jacobus Arminius, which challenged the prevailing Calvinism.

Sermons preached by Barret and Baro against the Calvinist doctrine of predestination ignited controversy. On 29 April 1595, Barret's sermon addressed three points:

1. salvation depended on human effort
2. God condemns the wicked for their evil deeds rather than on an arbitrary basis
3. it was impossible to receive certainty of salvation

Following the sermon, a group led by Whitaker, Humphrey Tyndall, and Robert Some campaigned for Barret's expulsion from his Caius College fellowship.

== Development ==
To settle the controversy, the heads of Cambridge University sent Whitaker and Tyndall to meet with John Whitgift, the archbishop of Canterbury, and other clergy at Lambeth Palace in London. Besides Whitgift, the most senior clergy involved in the discussions were Richard Fletcher, the bishop of London, and Richard Vaughan, the bishop-elect of Bangor. According to historian Nicholas Tyacke, the clergy were acting in their capacity as the Court of High Commission.

The Articles were drafted by Whitaker and somewhat modified by the bishops to make them less objectionable to anti-Calvinists. The Articles were adopted at Lambeth on 20 November 1595. The Articles were sent to Matthew Hutton, the archbishop of York, who endorsed them.

Whitgift did not inform the Queen about the Articles, and he tried to keep them a secret. Elizabeth learned of them around December 5 and promptly ordered Whitgift to suspend the Articles. The Queen was furious they had been formulated without her knowledge or consent. She also disliked the theology endorsed by the document. Without royal authorisation, the Articles never gained official status within the Church of England.

== Content ==
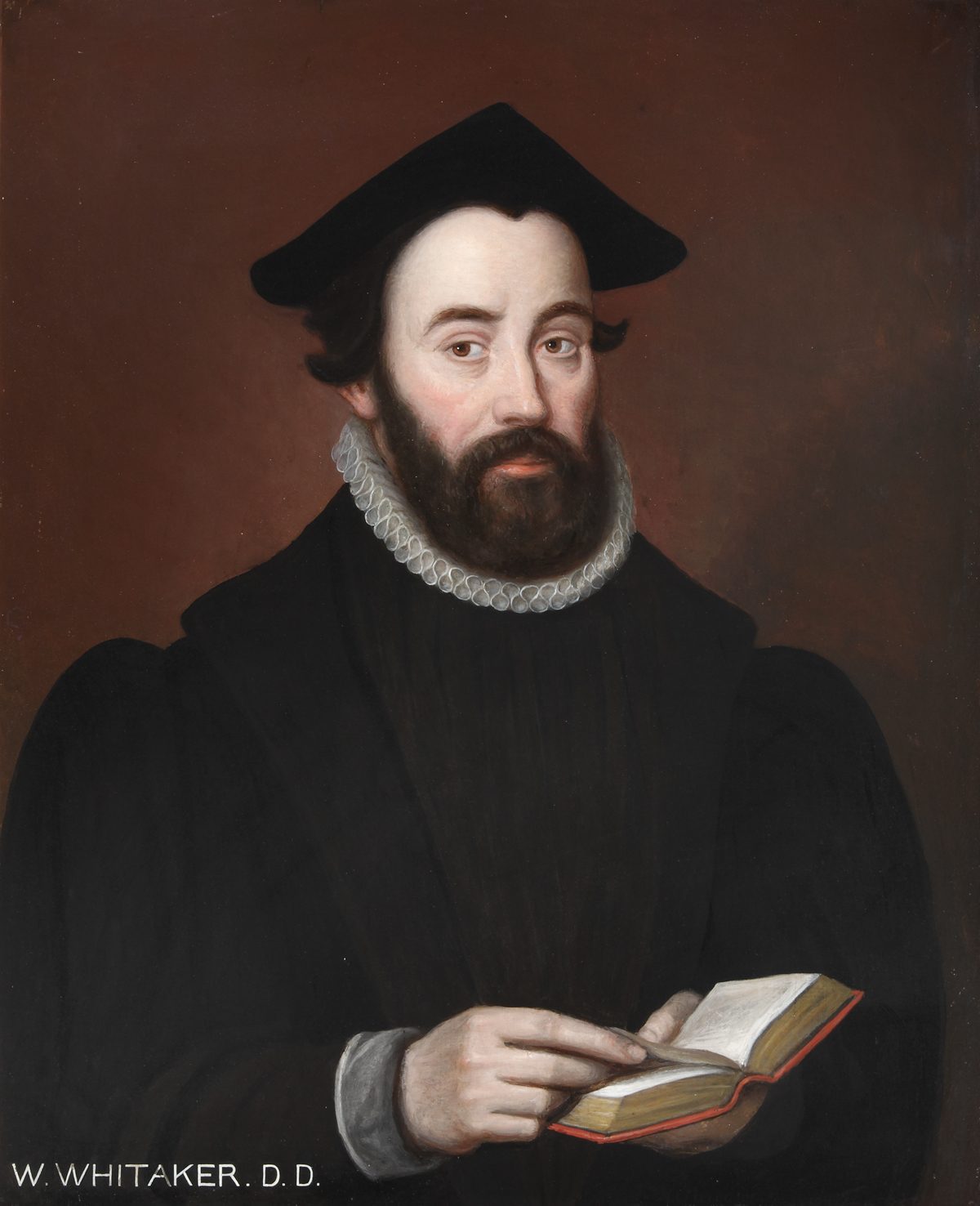
William Whitaker, primary author of the Lambeth Articles

The Lambeth Articles were not intended to replace the Thirty-nine Articles but were designed to officially align Article 17 ("Of Predestination and Election") to Calvinist theology, specifically sublapsarian Calvinism. The nine articles adopted at Lambeth can be summarised as follows:

1. The eternal election of some to life, and the reprobation of others to death.
2. The moving cause of predestination to life is not the foreknowledge of faith and good works, but only the good pleasure of God.
3. The number of the elect is unalterably fixed.
4. Those who are not predestinated to life shall necessarily be damned for their sins.
5. The true faith of the elect never fails finally nor totally.
6. A true believer, or one furnished with justifying faith, has a full assurance and certainty of remission and everlasting salvation in Christ.
7. Saving grace is not communicated to all men.
8. No man can come to the Son unless the Father shall draw him, but all men are not drawn by the Father.
9. It is not in every one's will and power to be saved.

== Church of Ireland ==
The Lambeth Articles were accepted at the 1615 Convocation of Dublin and consequently engrafted in the Irish Articles (written by James Ussher). One can find the basis of the Five Points of Calvinism contained in the Canons of Dort (1618–19) in the Lambeth Articles.

== Historiography ==
In his 1958 work Reformation and Reaction in Tudor Cambridge, historian Harry Porter argued that the Lambeth Articles were a failed attempt by a Calvinist minority to force their views on the rest of the church. Porter argued Archbishop Whitgift only endorsed the Articles to keep the peace within the church, but he modified Whitaker's original draft to make the Articles acceptable to non-Calvinists as a compromise. Porter's thesis was endorsed by Peter White and Debora Shuger.

According to Peter Lake, the Lambeth Articles represent a compromise between the Cambridge theologians and Whitgift, both of whom shared common Calvinist assumptions. The Cambridge theologians were more rigid and scholastic in their theology, and Whitgift considered them to be intolerant. The Lambeth Articles illustrated Whitgift's belief that "the opinions of every English divine of significance could be accommodated, without undue strain, within a framework of thought that was recognizably Calvinist".

=== Bibliography ===
- Gilliam, Elizabeth; Tighe, W. J. (1992). "To "Run with the Time" Archbishop Whitgift, the Lambeth Articles, and the Politics of Theological Ambiguity in Late Elizabethan England". The Sixteenth Century Journal. 23 (2).
- Lake, Peter (1982). Moderate Puritans and the Elizabethan Church. Cambridge University Press.
- Marshall, Peter (2017). "Settlement Patterns: The Church of England, 1553–1603". In Milton, Anthony (ed.). The Oxford History of Anglicanism. Vol. 1: Reformation and Identity, c. 1520–1662. Oxford University Press. pp. 45–62. ISBN 9780199639731.
- Schaff, Philip (1877). The Creeds of Christendom: With a History and Critical Notes. Vol. 1. New York: Harper.
- Schaff, Philip (1878). The Creeds of Christendom: The Evangelical Protestant Creeds, with Translations. Vol. 3. New York: Harper.
- Tyacke, Nicholas (2022). "The Lambeth Articles (1595) and the Doctrinal Stance of the Church of England". The English Historical Review. 137 (587). doi:10.1093/ehr/ceac128. ISSN 0013-8266.
