= Richard Parkes (clergyman) =

Richard Parkes (born 1559) was an English clergyman, known as a controversialist.

== Life ==
He was a native of Lancashire, elected king's scholar of Brasenose College, Oxford, in 1574, and matriculated there on 20 December 1577. He graduated B.A. in 1578–79, and M.A. in 1585. He took holy orders when B.A., and, according to Anthony Wood, ‘became a goodly divine’ and a noted preacher.

== The Descensus controversy ==
In 1604 he wrote against Andrew Willet. His purpose was to support the Augustinian view of the article of faith respecting Christ's descent into hell, against the Calvinistic view of the Puritans, who stood out against the growing popularity of Jacobus Arminius. At the suggestion of friends, Parkes wrote anonymously his Brief Answer to certain Objections against Christ's Descension into Hell, sent in writing by a Minister unto a Gentleman in the Country. This was answered by Willet in his Limbomastix, also published anonymously, in which his unknown opponent is styled a ‘Limbist,’ and is accused of sympathy with Cardinal Bellarmine.

In 1607 Parkes published under his own name An Apology of three Testimonies of Holy Scripture concerning the Article of our Creed, He descended into Hell. This consists of two books, of which the first is the Brief Answer revised and enlarged, while the second is A Rejoinder to a Reply made against the former book, lately published in a printed pamphlet, entitled Limbo-mastix. In the same year Willet produced his Loidoromastix, in which Parkes is roughly handled.
