= Irish Articles of Religion =

1615 volume of theological articles

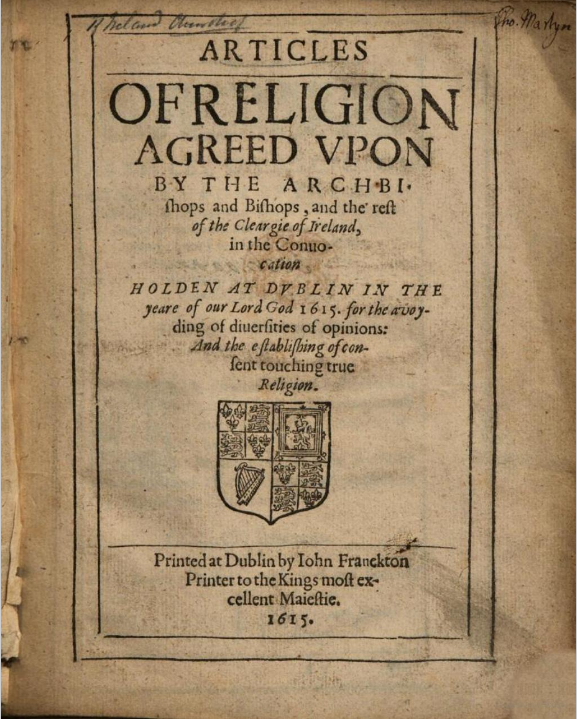
Title page of a 1615 printing of the Irish Articles of Religion

The Irish Articles of Religion of 1615 are a series of 104 theological articles which were intended to serve as a standard of doctrine for the post-Reformation Church of Ireland. Adopted by the Convocation of Irish Protestant clergy that met in Dublin in 1615, and probably written by the future Archbishop of Armagh, James Ussher, the Irish Articles defined the Church of Ireland in a largely Reformed theological direction, even exceeding the Thirty-nine Articles of the Church of England in this regard.

After the accession of Charles I, the appointment of William Laud as Archbishop of Canterbury, and the Restoration in 1660, the Irish Articles of Religion were eventually superseded by the Thirty-nine Articles as the doctrinal standard for the Church of Ireland and largely fell out of prominence in Anglicanism. However, the Irish Articles would later influence the Westminster Confession drawn up in 1646, which was later adopted by the Church of Scotland and Presbyterian churches throughout the world.

== Background ==
After King Henry VIII broke with the papacy, he was proclaimed the Supreme Head on earth of the Church of England by the English Parliament in 1534. In 1537, the Irish Parliament followed suit and proclaimed Henry VIII Supreme Head on earth of the Church of Ireland. Although the post-Reformation Church of Ireland retained most of the diocesan buildings and lands, most native Irish remained Roman Catholic, and by the early 17th century, a mostly Presbyterian settler population emerged in the province of Ulster.

Largely confined to an English-speaking minority in the Pale, the Church of Ireland adopted the use of the Book of Common Prayer in 1560 during the reign of Queen Elizabeth I, and followed the lead of the Church of England in setting the standards for doctrine and worship for much of its early post-Reformation history. The Church of England after the English Reformation and the Elizabethan Religious Settlement had been moving towards forming a Reformed consensus amongst its leadership, and certain bishops in the Church of England crafted the Lambeth Articles in 1595. Although never approved by Queen Elizabeth I, the Lambeth Articles were intended to supplement the Thirty-nine Articles of Religion finalised and adopted by the Church of England in 1571, supplementing Article 17 with clarified teaching on the doctrine of predestination. At the Hampton Court Conference of 1604, a proposal to formally insert the Lambeth propositions into the Thirty-nine Articles failed. However, the Lambeth propositions were accepted in the Church of Ireland in which Puritanism was ascendent.

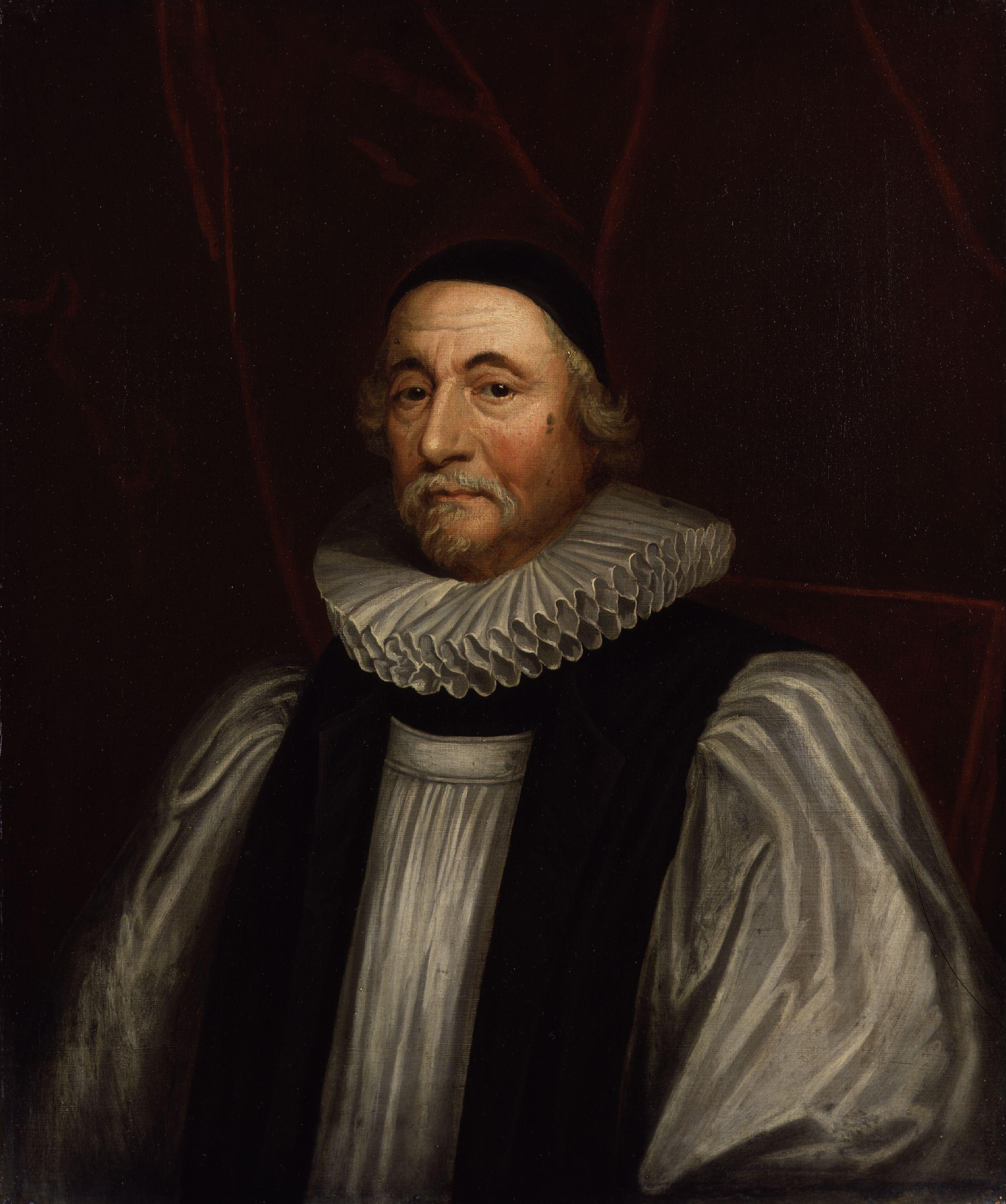
James Ussher, Vice-Chancellor of Trinity College Dublin and later Archbishop of Armagh, considered the principal author of the Irish Articles of Religion (1615)

== Development ==
The Church of Ireland would hold its first convocation of archbishops, bishops, and other clergy beginning in 1613, held in conjunction with a session of the Irish Parliament in Dublin. The Reformed consensus was even stronger in Ireland than in England, and the convocation of clergy decided to develop its own confession of faith along the lines of Reformed theology. The new articles of religion, modeled on the Thirty-nine Articles of Religion and (in all likelihood) principally written by James Ussher, then Vice-Chancellor of Trinity College Dublin, were adopted by the 1615 Convocation of Irish clergy in Dublin, then approved by the Viceroy of Ireland in 1615. In addition to incorporating much of the material in the Thirty-nine Articles, the Irish Articles also incorporated the content of the nine Lambeth Articles developed in 1595 and the phraseology of Archbishop Thomas Cranmer.

== Content ==
While the Thirty-nine Articles of Religion of the Church of England were never intended to be a complete confession of the Christian faith, the Irish Articles of Religion, by contrast, aimed to be much more comprehensive and systematic, defining the Church of Ireland in a decidedly Reformed direction theologically. The Irish doctrinal articles number 104 in all, and while reproducing the content of 37 of the Thirty-nine Articles, the Irish articles also incorporate other material, including from the two Books of Homilies, commended in Article 35 of the Thirty-nine Articles. The Irish articles differ markedly in their order from the original Thirty-nine Articles, often following the lead of Reformed confessions produced earlier in continental Europe (such as the Second Helvetic Confession) in the structure. The Irish Articles also fail to incorporate Article 36 (which dealt with the consecration of bishops and ministers) of the earlier Thirty-nine Articles. This omission perhaps catered to Puritans who existed within both the Church of Ireland and the Church of England at the time (some of whom advocated other forms of church government besides episcopalianism).

The Irish Articles of Religion can be divided into nineteen sections based on their content:

Articles 1-7 (Of the Holy Scripture and the Three Creeds): The first articles deal with the authority of Scripture and the three ancient creeds. The Irish Articles go further than the Thirty-nine articles in listing the canonical books of both the Old and New Testaments and affirming their inspiration (1-2), in disclaiming the divine inspiration of the Apocrypha (3), of advocating for the translating of the Scriptures into all languages (4), and in affirming the perspicuity and sufficiency of Scripture for salvation (5-6). Article 7 affirms the Apostles', Nicene, and Athanasian creeds as being consistent with holy Scripture.

Articles 8-10 (Of Faith in the Holy Trinity): These articles largely replicate the doctrines of the Thirty-nine articles on the Trinity, including an outline of the doctrine (8), language on the eternal generation of the Son (9), and the procession of the Holy Spirit from the Father and the Son (10).

Articles 11-17 (Of God's Eternal Decree and Predestination): Article 11 affirms absolute divine sovereignty (eternal decree) as well as the existence of secondary causes. Articles 12-17 explain the doctrine of predestination: that from all eternity God elected (predestined) some to everlasting life and left (reprobated) others to death (12). This election to everlasting life is not based on foreseen faith or of anything within the person, but on the 'good pleasure of God himself' (14). The Irish Articles places a prelapsarian emphasis on predestination, adopting and incorporating the language of the nine Lambeth Articles authored in 1595.

Articles 18-21 (Of the Creation and Government of All Things): These articles explain the doctrines of creation (18) and providence, touching on the creation of all things, including both angels and man (19-20). After explaining the creation of man, the articles then go on to explain how the 'covenant of the law' was engrafted on the heart of man, with the promise of everlasting life upon condition of man's perfect obedience (21, cf. the Covenant of Works explained in the Westminster Confession).

Articles 22-28 (Of the Fall of Man, Original Sin, and the State of Man before Justification): These articles explain how Fall of man (22) corrupted mankind's nature with original sin (23-24), rendering man unable by his own natural strength to respond to God (25), thus his works which do not proceed from the inspiration of the Spirit cannot merit grace (26), and make him liable to God's judgment (27). Although God permits evil for the ultimate good of his elect and the manifestation of his glory, he is not the author of sin (28).

Articles 29-30 (Of Christ, the Mediator of the Second Covenant): These articles describe Jesus Christ and the hypostatic union of divine and human natures in the person of the Son (29). He is said to be the mediator of the second covenant (cf. the Covenant of Grace explained in the Westminster Confession), who through his life, death, burial, resurrection, ascension, and future return to judge the world reconciled man to God and took away the sins of the world (30). In these articles, and in Articles 18-21, the reader can trace the influence of covenant theology that was circulating within the Reformed churches at this time.

Articles 31-33 (Of the Communicating of the Grace of Christ): These articles make clear that salvation is to found in Christ alone, and not in any thing in man, either by his belonging to any sect or living by any law of nature (31). Also, the articles make clear that no one can come to Christ unless the Father draw him (32), but that the elect are effectually called to Christ and regenerated by his Holy Spirit, and thus are made partakers of Christ and all his benefits (33).

Articles 34-38 (Of Justification and Faith): These articles articulate the Reformation doctrine that believers are accounted righteous before God 'only for the merit of our Lord and Saviour Jesus Christ, applied by faith, and not for our own works or merits' (34). This justification by faith alone, comes as the free gift of God in his Son Jesus Christ, who by his ransom paid and his fulfillment of the law credited to believers, satisfies the justice and mercy of God (35). This justifying faith also comes with true repentance, hope, charity, and the fear of God (36). Justifying faith does not mean simply the belief in general in Christianity, but 'a particular application of the gracious promises of the gospel to the comfort of our own souls' (37). This justifying faith is never extinguished in the regenerate (38).

Articles 39-45 (Of Sanctification and Good Works): The articles go on to say that sanctification follows justification (39), whereby believers in Christ are granted true repentance (which is a 'godly sorrow' for former sins with a 'constant resolution [...] to cleave unto God and to lead a new life' (40). Good works that spring from true faith, though they cannot in themselves make satisfaction for sins, are nevertheless pleasing to God (41). These good works are such as God has approved in his holy Scripture, and thus the articles deny the doctrine of works of supererogation (42, 45). The regenerate after baptism, and for the rest of this life, will always struggle with sin and cannot perfectly fulfil the law of God, and so must always repent (43-44).

Articles 46-56 (Of the Service of God): From the articles on sanctification, the articles then proceed on outlining the service to God alone (54) that believers owe, summarizing it as to 'believe in him, to fear him, and to love him with all our heart, with all our mind, and with all our soul, and with all our strength; to worship him, and to give him thanks; to put our whole trust in him, to call upon him, to honor his holy name and his Word, and to serve him truly all the days of our life' (46). These articles go into particular ways that believers serve God even in times of affliction (49), including prayer (47-48), fasting (50-51), true worship (52) that does not involve images of the Father, the Son, or the Holy Spirit (53), hallowing of God's name, permitting the taking of oaths when appropriate (55), and the observance of the Lord's Day (56). These articles thus cover the Great Commandment and the first four of the Ten Commandments (according to the numbering used by Reformed Churches).

Articles 57-62 (Of the Civil Magistrate): These articles affirm the power of the king (since the monarch at the time was James I) to govern in all affairs civil as well as ecclesiastical, and that no foreign power ought to have superiority over him (57). This power does not involve administering the Word and Sacraments, or the power of the Keys, but the power that all godly princes have to 'contain all estates and degrees committed to his charge by God [... and to] restrain the stubborn and evil-doers with the power of the civil sword' (58). The articles further deny the authority of the Pope to interfere with the power of the king, particularly through excommunication, deposition, or commanding subjects to disobey or to take up arms against the king (59-60), and that the laws may punish Christians for offenses (61), and that Christians may when called upon, bear arms and serve in just wars at the command of the civil magistrate (62).

Articles 63-67 (Of Our Duty Towards Our Neighbors): These articles outline the duty believers owe to their neighbors, covering the last six of the Ten Commandments, summarized in the commandment to love our neighbors as ourselves. Believers are to 'honour superiors, preserve the safety of men's persons, as also their chastity, goods, and good names; to bear no malice nor hatred in [their] hearts, to keep our bodies in temperance, soberness, and chastity; to be true and just in all our doings; not to covet other men’s goods, but labor truly to get our own living, and to do our duty in that estate of life unto which it pleaseth God to call us' (63). Marriage is to be allowed for all who stand in need of it, including ministers in the Church, thus condemning clerical celibacy (64). While denying that believers' property is to held in common (as the Anabaptists would affirm), the articles do require the giving of alms to the poor (65). Faith is to be kept even with heretics and unbelievers. The Roman Catholic doctrine of mental reservation is declared ungodly and tending to subversion of society (66).

Articles 68-74 (Of the Church and the Outward Ministry of the Gospel): These articles explain the difference between the invisible Church, which is composed of all elect believers in all times and in all places, also known as the 'catholic' or universal church (68), and the particular or visible churches (composed of all who profess faith in Christ and live under the outward means of salvation), where the Word of God is taught, the Sacraments administered, and the authority of the Keys is used, that is, the exercise of church discipline (69). The Church militant is on earth, and the Church triumphant is in heaven (68). In the visible church, the evil is sometimes mixed with the good, even in the ministry, but the wickedness of some ministers, however, does not invalidate the preaching of the Word or the administration of the Sacraments, which are effectual because of Christ's institution (70). Those ministers suspected of being wicked are to be tried by the church, and if found guilty, deposed from office (70). No man is to undertake the office of ministry without being lawfully called and sent (71). The worship of the church is be undertaken in the language of the people, rather than a language that they would not understand, such as Latin which was prevalent in the liturgy of the medieval Church (72). The powers of ministers to pronounce the absolution and forgiveness of sins, as well as the power to excommunicate those who publicly denounce the church, are also discussed in these articles (73-74).

Articles 75-80 (Of the Authority of the Church, General Councils, and Bishop of Rome): These articles explain that the church is not to ordain anything contrary to Scripture (75). General councils are only to be called on the authority of princes (that is, the civil magistrate), and general councils may err, and have erred. Thus, councils of the church only carry authority insofar as what they teach can be supported by Scripture (76). Traditions and ceremonies in the church may vary by time and place; particular churches can alter or abolish traditions created by human authority (77). Various churches, including the Church of Rome, have erred, not only regarding practices and ceremonies, but also in matters of faith (78). The articles go further than the Thirty-nine Articles in denying the authority of the Bishop of Rome to be the supreme head of the Church, declaring him to be that man of sin, foretold in the holy Scriptures, whom the Lord shall consume with the spirit of his mouth, and abolish with the brightness of his coming.' The Irish Articles thus identify the Pope as Antichrist (79-80).

Articles 81-84 (Of the State of the Old and New Testament): These articles outline the differences between the Old and the New Covenants. In the old covenant, the commandents of the law were more expounded, and the promises of Christ 'darkly propounded, shadowed with a multitude of types and figures' (81). In the new covenant, the joyful tidings of the Christ who has come are now clearly expounded, and shared with all people in all nations, whether Jews or Gentiles (83). In both covenants, everlasting salvation is offered to mankind through Christ, the only mediator between God and man (82). After the coming of Christ, the ceremonial and civil commandments contained in the law of Moses are no longer binding on Christians, but the moral commandments still are (84).

Articles 85-88 (Of the Sacraments of the New Testament): These articles explain the Church of Ireland's sacramental theology and mirror in many ways Articles 25-31 of the Thirty-nine Articles. According to the articles, sacraments are signs of divine grace which God works invisibly but effectively in people's lives, and not merely outward signs of a person's faith; a view characteristic of radical Protestants. Through sacraments, God creates and strengthens the faith of believers (85). While the Roman Catholic Church claimed seven sacraments, the articles recognise only two: baptism and the Lord's Supper (86). The five rites called 'sacraments' by Roman Catholics are identified in the articles as either corrupted imitations of the Apostles (confirmation, penance, and extreme unction) or as 'states of life allowed in the Scriptures' (holy orders and marriage) (87). Adoration of sacraments is condemned, as well as the unworthy reception of them (88).

Articles 89-91 (Of Baptism): These articles explain that in the sacrament of baptism, regeneration (or the gift of new life), membership in the church, justification, forgiveness of sins, adoption as children of God, and sanctification are all sealed to believers (89). The articles state that infant baptism is 'agreeable to the Word of God' and should continue to be practised in the church, in contrast to the Anabaptist position (90). The addition of elements to baptism that were added over the centuries by the ancient and medieval church (such as the use of oil, salt, saliva, exorcisms, and the hallowing of the water) are to be rejected (91).

Articles 92-100 (Of the Lord's Supper): These articles expound that in the Lord's Supper, participants become partakers of the body and blood of Christ and receive the spiritual benefits of Christ's death on the cross (92). According to the articles, this partaking should not be understood in terms of the Catholic doctrine of transubstantiation, which is condemned as 'repugnant to plain testimonies of the Scripture.' Instead, the articles declare that there is no change in the substance of the bread and wine (93). Rather, participants are fed the body of Christ after a heavenly and spiritual manner and through faith (94-95), thus an unbeliever, who consumes the elements of the Supper, does not receive Christ (96). Both the bread and wine are to be received by communicants (97). The keeping of the Sacrament in a tabernacle, Eucharistic procession and adoration are said to have not been ordained by Christ (98). The articles declare that the 'all-sufficient sacrifice of our Saviour Christ, offered once forever upon the cross' is 'the only propitiation and satisfaction for all our sins, thus the sacrifice of the Mass is neither agreeable to Christ's ordinance nor grounded in apostolic doctrine (99). This was meant as a repudiation of the idea that the Mass was a sacrifice in which Christ was offered for the forgiveness of sins for the living and the dead in purgatory. Private reception of Communion by the priest alone with communicants is contrary to the institution of Christ (100).

Articles 101-104 (Of the State of the Souls of Men after they be Departed out of this Life, together with the General Resurrection and the Last Judgment): The last four articles deal with eschatology, namely, outlining the state of the souls of believers and unbelievers after death, namely heaven and hell respectively (101), the resurrection of the dead and the Last Judgment (103). These articles also condemn the doctrines of Roman Catholicism concerning limbo, purgatory, prayer for the dead, adoration of images and relics, and invocation of the saints as contrary to Scripture (102). The final article states, 'When the last judgment is finished, Christ shall deliver up the kingdom to his Father, and God shall be all in all.'

The Decree of the Synod

If any minister, of what degree or quality soever he be, shall publicly teach any doctrine contrary to these Articles agreed upon, if, after due admonition, he do not conform himself, and cease to disturb the peace of the Church, let him be silenced, and deprived of all spiritual promotions he doth enjoy.

== Later history and aftermath ==
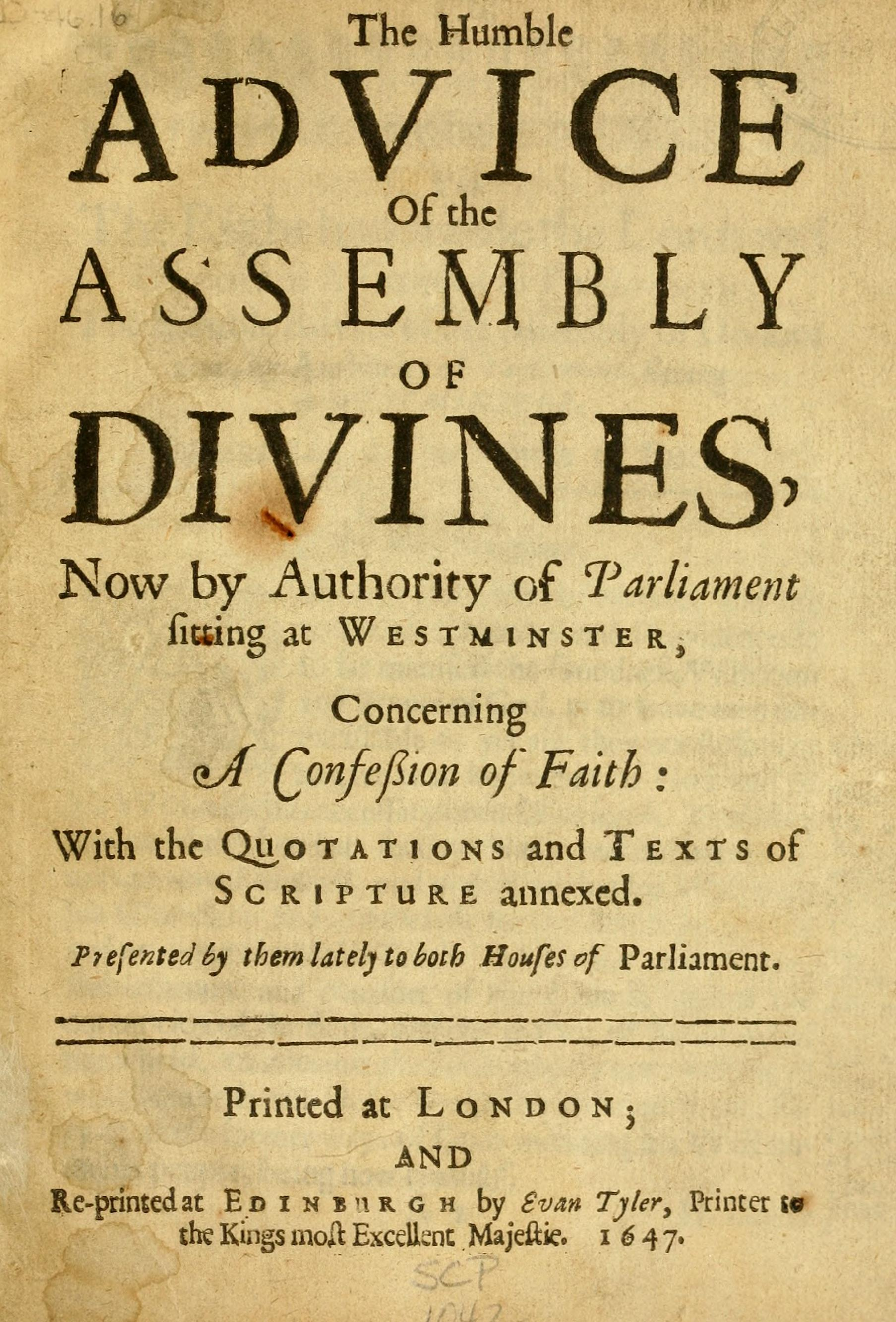
Title page of a 1647 printing of the Westminster Confession, which was influenced by the Irish Articles of Religion

The Irish Articles of Religion were designed to be a public confession and rule of doctrine, authorised by the Church of Ireland's synod and the Viceroy of Ireland, replacing the Eleven Articles of Archbishop Matthew Parker as the standard of doctrine. The Synod of the Church of Ireland decreed that any clergyman who taught contrary to the Articles, after being admonished and who nevertheless persisted in teaching contrary to the articles, should be 'silenced, and deprived of all spiritual promotions he doth enjoy.' However, the Church of Ireland never required strict subscription to the Irish Articles, thus accommodating clergy and laity who may have had reservations in affirming the articles in their entirety. The Reformed doctrines contained in the Irish Articles (including on predestination) were produced a few years before the Synod of Dort, which produced its Canons in 1618–1619, and it has been said that the adoption of the Irish Articles influenced some of the Reformed ministers of Scotland to settle in Ireland.

After Charles I became king of England, Scotland, and Ireland in 1625, and after William Laud became Archbishop of Canterbury in 1633, a reaction against Reformed theology began in the Church of England which was soon to have its effect in Ireland. The original Thirty-nine Articles were adopted by the Church of Ireland at another convocation held in 1635, convened by the Lord Deputy of Ireland, Thomas Wentworth, 1st Earl of Strafford, and his Laudian chaplain, John Bramhall. While James Ussher (by now Archbishop of Armagh and Primate of All Ireland) had always intended the adoption of the Thirty-nine Articles to be in addition to, and not instead of, the 1615 Irish Articles, nevertheless, the adoption of the Thirty-nine Articles had the impact of sidelining and superseding the Irish Articles. After the Irish Rebellion of 1641, the Wars of the Three Kingdoms, and the Restoration in 1660, the Irish Articles of Religion were largely ignored by the Church of Ireland. Nevertheless, in the midst of the civil wars in England, Scotland, and Ireland, the Westminster Assembly chose to use the Irish Articles as the chief basis for the formulation of the Westminster Confession produced in 1646, as can be seen in the structure, chapters and subdivisions, and the language used by both confessions in explaining the core doctrines. The Irish Articles of Religion, although largely forgotten by Anglicanism today, thus serves as a valuable link connecting the Thirty-nine Articles, the Lambeth Articles, and the Westminster Confession of Faith adopted by the Church of Scotland and Presbyterian churches throughout the world.
