= Robert Some =

Robert Some (Soame) (1542–1609) was an English churchman and academic. Master of Peterhouse, Cambridge from 1589, Some played a prominent part in the ecclesiastical controversies of his time, taking a middle course, hostile alike to extreme Puritans and Anglicans.

== Life ==
He was born at Lynn Regis in 1542, one of the sons of Thomas Soame, of Betely alias Beetley, Norfolk (Launditch Hundred), and his first wife Anne, sister and heir of Francis Knighton of Little Bradley, Suffolk, and widow of Richard le Hunt of Little Bradley. He matriculated as a pensioner from St John's College, Cambridge, in May 1559, became a scholar on 27 July 1559, graduated B.A. in 1561–2, and proceeded M.A. in 1565, B.D. in 1572, and D.D. in 1580. He was elected fellow of Queens' College, Cambridge, in 1562, and vice-president in 1572. When Elizabeth I visited Cambridge in 1564 he was one of the two B.A.s selected to compose Latin verses in her honour; he also welcomed her with a Latin speech at Queens'.

In 1570 he preached in St. Mary's Church against pluralities and non-residence, and on 18 April 1573 became rector of Girton, near Cambridge. In 1583 he describes himself as chaplain to the Earl of Leicester. On 11 May 1589 he was made master of Peterhouse on the recommendation of John Whitgift.

In the early days of his mastership he joined the party opposed to Peter Baro and his friends, and offended Whitgift by interfering while the proceedings against William Barret were in progress. After Whitgift had reproved him, he preached a sermon which many thought to have been directed against Whitgift and the court of high commission. For this he was convened before the heads of colleges in July 1595, but in the end the difficulty was smoothed over.

In July 1599 he look part in a disputation as to Christ's descent into hell, and opposed John Overall, the regius professor of divinity, on this and other matters. He also interposed in the Marprelate controversy. He was answered by John Penry; and Some rejoined.

He was Vice-chancellor of the University of Cambridge in 1590, 1591, 1599, and 1608. He died while in office, on 14 January 1609, and was buried at Little St. Mary's Church.

== Notes ==
Attribution

- This article incorporates text from a publication now in the public domain: Archbold, William Arthur Jobson (1898). "Some, Robert". Dictionary of National Biography. Vol. 53. pp. 217–218.

Academic offices
Preceded by Andrew Perne	Master of Peterhouse, Cambridge; 1589-1609	Succeeded by John Richardson
Preceded by Thomas Preston	Vice-Chancellor of the University of Cambridge; 1590	Succeeded by Thomas Legge
Preceded by John Jegon	Vice-Chancellor of the University of Cambridge; 1599	Succeeded by John Jegon
