= Andrew Perne =

British academic (c. 1519–1589)

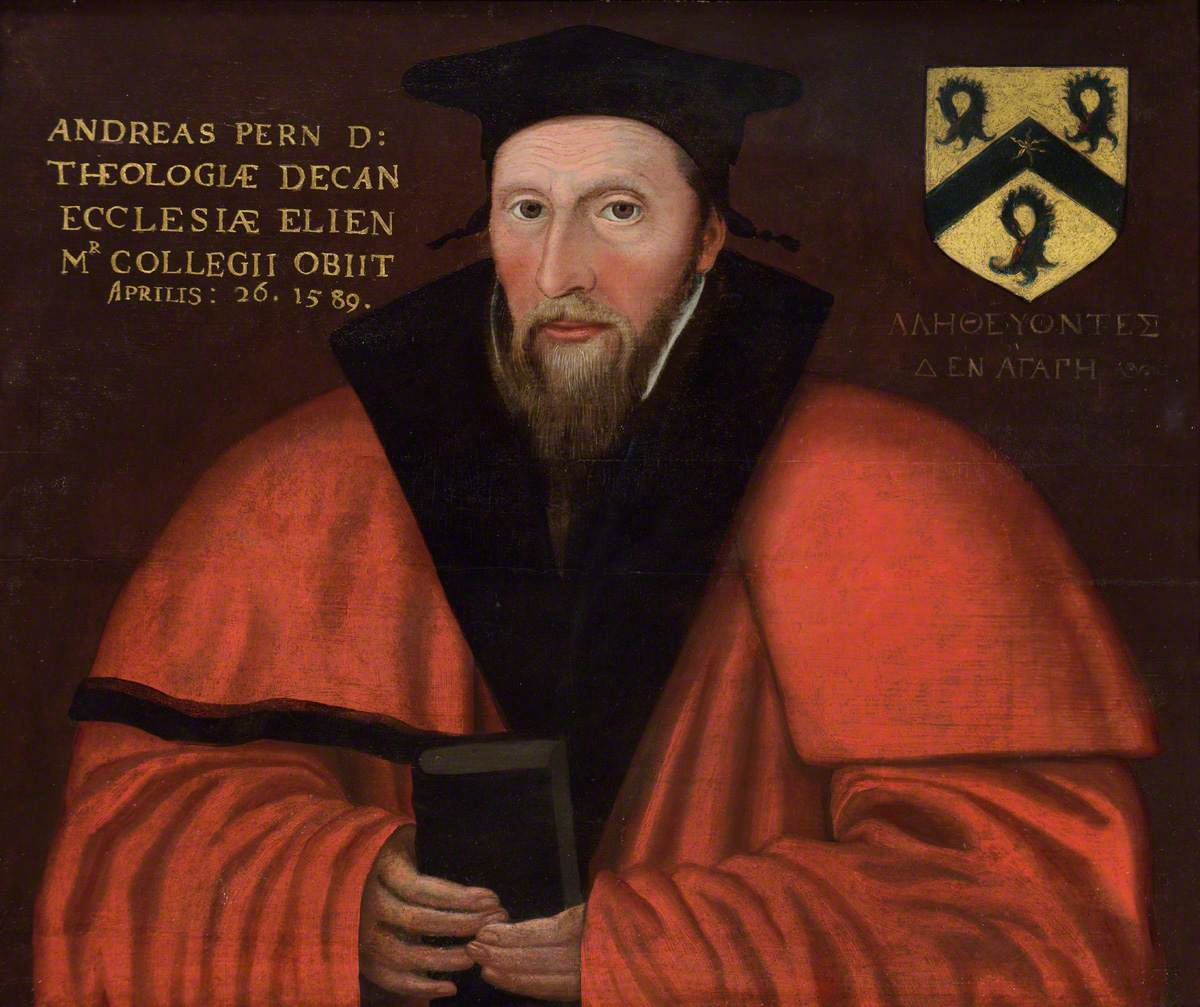
Andrew Perne

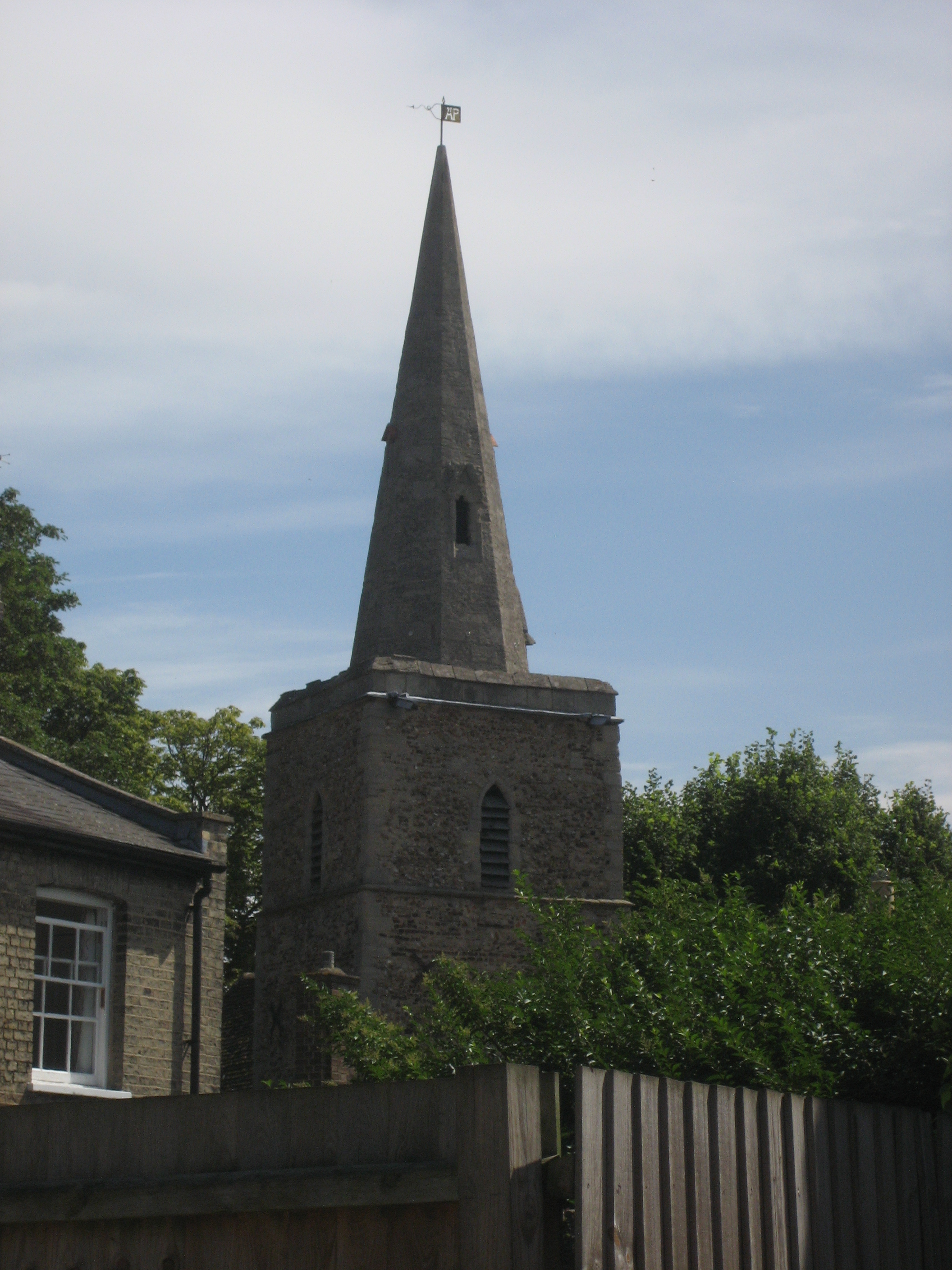
Weather vane with the letters AP, referring to Andrew Perne's "remarkable versatility", on St Peter's Church, Cambridge

Andrew Perne (c. 1519 – 26 April 1589), Vice-Chancellor of Cambridge University and Dean of Ely, was the son of John Perne of East Bilney, Norfolk.

== Biography ==
Perne was educated at St John's College, Cambridge, graduating BA in 1539, BD in 1547 and DD in 1552. He was elected fellow of St John's in 1540, but moved to Queens' later that year. He was successively bursar and dean of Queens', while culminated in becoming vice-president in 1551, and was five times vice-chancellor of the university. Scurrilous Puritans said he had once been the homosexual lover of John Whitgift, later Archbishop of Canterbury, with whom he went to live in old age at Lambeth Palace. However, he owes his notoriety to his remarkable versatility, and, like the Vicar of Bray, he was always faithful to the national religion, whatever it might be. A weathervane he donated with his initials of AP was said to have swung between 'A Papist', 'A Protestant' and 'A Puritan', depending on which way the wind blew.

In April 1547 he advocated Catholic doctrines but recanted two months later, and his Protestant faith was strengthened during Edward VI's reign; he was appointed a royal chaplain and canon of Windsor. Soon after Mary I's accession, however, he perceived the error of his ways and was made Master of Peterhouse in 1553 and Dean of Ely in 1557.

He preached the sermon in 1557 when the bodies of Martin Bucer and Paul Fagius were disinterred in Cambridge and burnt for heresy and also, remarkably, in 1560 when the proceedings were reversed and the dead heretics were rehabilitated. In Elizabeth I's reign, he subscribed the Thirty-nine Articles, denounced the pope and tried to convert Abbot Feckenham to Protestantism, and in 1584, Whitgift in vain recommended him for a bishopric.

He was selected as the type of Anglican prelate by the authors of the Martin Marprelate tracts and other Puritans, who nicknamed him "Old Andrew Turncoat", "Andrew Ambo", "Old Father Palinode". Cambridge wits, it was said, translated "perno" by "I turn, I rat, I change often", and a coat that had often been turned was said to have been "perned".

The historian Alice Hogge recounts an episode in which a close friend asked Perne "to tell her honestly and simply which was the holy religion that see her safe to heaven". Perne replied that if she wished, she could live in the religion which the Queen and the kingdom professed – Anglicanism – "but don't die in it. Die in faith and communion with the Catholic Church, that is, if you want to save your soul". As Hogge notes wryly, he never had the chance to follow his own advice since he died suddenly on the way back to his room after dining and "in the headquarters of that faith [Anglicanism], Lambeth Palace itself".

On his death, he bequeathed the greater part of his library to Peterhouse, where he had been Master, together with the funds to house it in what is now the Perne Library there.

== Notes ==
Religious titles
| Preceded by Robert Steward | Dean of Ely; 1557–1589 | Succeeded by John Bell |
Academic offices
| Preceded by Ralph Aynsworth | Master of Peterhouse, Cambridge; 1554–1589 | Succeeded by Robert Some |
| Preceded by John Madew | Vice-Chancellor of the University of Cambridge; 1551 | Succeeded by Edward Hawford |
| Preceded by Cuthbert Scott | Vice-Chancellor of the University of Cambridge; 1556 | Succeeded by John Pory |
| Preceded by Edmund Cosyn | Vice-Chancellor of the University of Cambridge; 1559 | Succeeded by Henry Harvey |
| Preceded by John Whitgift | Vice-Chancellor of the University of Cambridge; 1574 | Succeeded by John Still |
| Preceded by John Hatcher | Vice-Chancellor of the University of Cambridge; 1580 | Succeeded by William Fulke |
