= John Pory (priest) =

English churchman and academic

John Pory (1502/03–1570) was an English churchman and academic, Master of Corpus Christi College, Cambridge.

== Life ==
Born at Thrapstone, Northamptonshire, Pory was admitted to Corpus Christi College, Cambridge in 1520. He graduated B.A. in 1524, M.A. in 1527, B.D. in 1535, and D.D. in 1557. He was elected about 1534 fellow of Corpus and also of the college of St. John the Baptist at Stoke-by-Clare, Suffolk, where Matthew Parker, to whose friendship Pory owed preferments, was dean.

In 1557 Pory was elected Master of Corpus, and on 13 December of the year following he became vice-chancellor of Cambridge University. From 1555 to 1564 he was rector of Bunwell, Norfolk; from 1555 or 1556 till 1561 vicar of St Stephen's Church, Norwich; from 1558 to 1569 rector of Landbeach, Cambridgeshire; from 21 December 1559 prebendary of Ely Cathedral; from 19 August 1560 rector of Pulham St. Mary, Norfolk; and from 1 May 1564 prebendary of Canterbury Cathedral, resigning this prebend in 1567 for the seventh stall at Westminster Abbey.

On the visit of Queen Elizabeth I to Cambridge in August 1564, Pory was one of the four senior doctors who held the canopy over her as she entered King's College Chapel. He also took part in the divinity act held before the queen, on the thesis major est scripturæ quam ecclesiæ auctoritas. He afterwards attended Elizabeth when she visited Oxford in 1566, and was incorporated there. During his mastership a new library was fitted up in his college, the north side of which was reserved for the manuscripts which Parker was intending to present. Pory also persuaded him to increase the endowment.

Pory declined to resign his mastership when disabled by failing health from performing his duties; and Parker instigated complaints against him before the ecclesiastical commissioners. Pressure was applied before Pory withdrew, and Thomas Aldrich was appointed master of Corpus on 3 February 1570. Pory gave up all his preferments about the same time. He died at Thompson, Norfolk, and was buried there on 25 June 1570.

== Notes ==
Attribution

This article incorporates text from a publication now in the public domain: Lee, Sidney, ed. (1896). "Pory, John (died c. 1573)". Dictionary of National Biography. Vol. 46. London: Smith, Elder & Co.

.
