= George Estye =

George Estye (1566–1601) was an English clergyman.

== Life ==
Estye was educated at Caius College, Cambridge, proceeding B.A. in 1580–1. He was afterwards elected a fellow of his college, graduated M.A. in 1584, and proceeded B.D. in 1591. In 1598 he was chosen preacher of St. Mary's, Bury St Edmunds.

He died at Bury on 2 August 1601, and was buried in his church, where a monument, with a Latin inscription composed by Dr. Joseph Hall, bishop of Norwich, was erected to his memory.

His widow, Triphosa, became the second wife of Matthew Clerke, M.A. of Christ's College, Cambridge, twice mayor of King's Lynn, and M.P. for that borough.

== Works ==
He wrote:

- 'An Exposition on Psalm 51.'
- 'An Exposition on the Ten Commandments.'
- 'An Exposition on the Lord's Supper.'
- 'The Doctrine of Faith; or an Exposition on the Creed.'
- 'Exposition on the first part of the 119th Psalm.'
- 'The History of the Gospel.'
- 'Exposition on 1 Peter i. 13.'

All these works were printed in one volume, London, 1603.

- 'De Certitudine Salvtis, et perseverantia Sanctorum non-intercisa, Oratio eximia Cantabrigiæ habita a D. Esteio Theologo summo: qua, non-securitatem perversam, sed maximum pietatis zelum, certitudinis hujus genuinum fructum demonstrat.' In 'De Arminii Sententia qua electionem omnem particularem, fidei prævisæ docet inniti, Disceptatio Scholastica inter Nicolavm Grevinchovium Roterodamum, et Gulielmum Amesium Anglum,’ Amsterdam, 1613, pp. 59–70; and in Matthew Hutton's 'Brevis et dilucida explicatio veræ, certæ, et consolationis plenæ doctrinæ de electione, prædestinatione, ac reprobatione,’ Harderwick, 1613, p. 45. It seems that this or another treatise by Estye on the same subject is printed in Robert Some's 'De mortis Christi merito et efficacia, remissionis peccatorum per fidem certitudine, et justificantis fidei perseverantia, tres quæstiones,’ Harderwick, 1613.
