= John Overall (bishop) =

Bishop of Norwich

- Bishop of Norwich
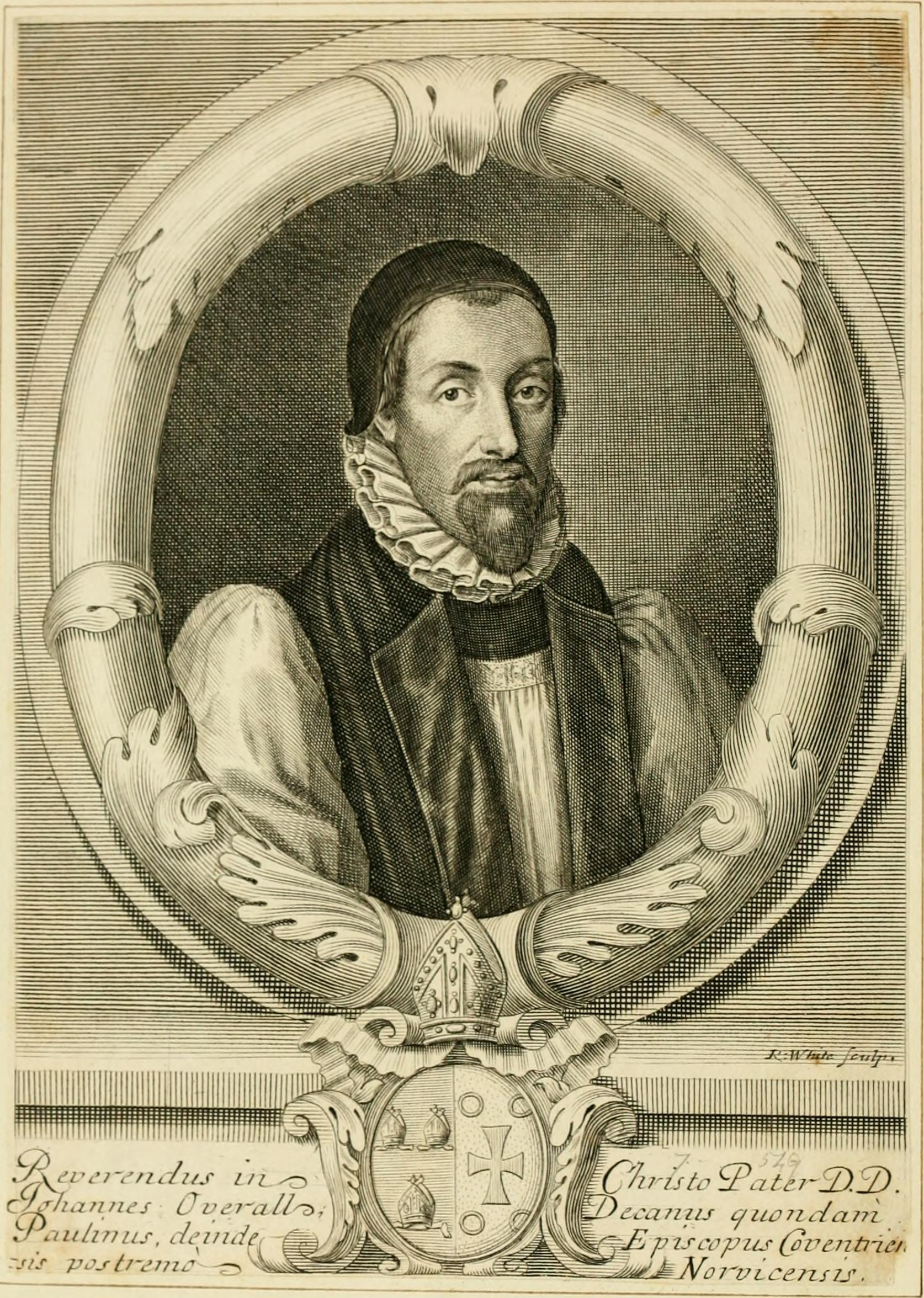
- Church: Church of England
- Diocese: Diocese of Norwich
- Installed: 1618
- Term ended: 1619 (death)
- Predecessor: John Jegon
- Successor: Samuel Harsnett
- Other posts: Dean of St Paul's (1601–1614); Bishop of Coventry and Lichfield (1614–1618)

Orders
- Ordination: 1591
- Consecration: 1614

Personal details
- Born: 1559 Hadleigh, Suffolk, England
- Died: 1619 (aged 59–60) Norwich, Norfolk, England
- Buried: Norwich Cathedral, Norfolk
- Denomination: Anglican
- Parents: George Overall
- Profession: Theologian
- Education: St John's College, Cambridge, Trinity College, Cambridge

John Overall (1559–1619) was the 38th bishop of the see of Norwich from 1618 until his death one year later. He had previously served as Bishop of Coventry and Lichfield (from 1614), as Dean of St Paul's Cathedral from 1601, as Master of Catharine Hall (under protest) from 1598, and as Regius Professor of Divinity at Cambridge University from 1596. He also served on the Court of High Commission and as a Translator (in the First Westminster Company) of the King James Version of the Bible.

Overall was born in Hadleigh, Suffolk and studied at St John's College and Trinity College, Cambridge. He is buried within Norwich Cathedral.

== Early years ==
John Overall was born in 1559, in Hadleigh, Suffolk. In Overall's time, Hadleigh was a centre for radical Protestantism. He was baptised there on 2 March 1561, the younger son of George Overall, who died that July. The future bishop studied at Hadleigh Grammar School, where he was a fellow student with Bible translator John Bois. John Still, then Lady Margaret's Professor of Divinity at the University of Cambridge, and a parish priest from 1571, took an interest in their education. Owing to his patronage and direction both applied to St John's College, Cambridge, when in 1575, Still became Master of the college. When Still moved to become Master of Trinity, Overall followed him and on 18 April 1578 was admitted as a scholar.

He graduated BA in 1579 and became a minor fellow on 2 October 1581. He proceeded MA (Cantab) the following year and on 30 March became a major fellow. Overall received other college preferments while Still was the master and at the start of the academic year in 1586, he was made praelector Graecus, by October 1588 he was praelector mathematicus. He became seneschal on 17 December 1589 and junior dean on 14 October 1591. That year he was also ordained a priest at Lincoln.

== Church of England ==
He was briefly, in 1591–1592, vicar of Trumpington, a college living just outside Cambridge. In 1592, Sir Thomas Heneage, on behalf of Elizabeth I, created him vicar of Epping, Essex. In October 1595 he was appointed to the Crown living of Henton by Elizabeth, and in December 1595 Overall was appointed Regius Professor of Divinity at Cambridge. His election may have been a snub for Archbishop John Whitgift, who had adopted the Calvinistic Lambeth Articles. Overall, with Lancelot Andrewes, Samuel Harsnett, and others, had rejected these articles in support of Peter Baro, the Lady Margaret's Professor of Divinity, when on 12 January 1596 he attacked them from the pulpit. This opposition cost Baro his chair, as he failed to be re-elected in 1596. John Overall was also a friend to the erratic mystic William Alabaster (1568–1640), even throughout his years of imprisonment, and was the tutor to Robert Devereux, 2nd Earl of Essex at Trinity College. Perhaps Overall brought these two acquaintances together. Essex became Alabaster’s patron. In Alabaster’s Conversion we read:

The only thinge that I desired most was to have some disputation abowt my religion, whereof I was well in hope when I sawe certaine learned men of the university to come and visite me, as namely the cheef divinitie reader, Doctor Overall, that was of Trinity College also, and had byn my tutor in former tymes and loved me well...

In 1599, Overall clashed with the authorities when he maintained that the perseverance of a truly justified man was conditional upon repentance. There followed a year-long campaign against Overall which ultimately had little effect. Through it all, he retained his chair until he resigned it in 1607.

As one of the chaplains-in-ordinary to the queen, Overall was appointed by Whitgift in 1598 to preach before her on the third Wednesday of Lent, 15 March, in place of Bishop Godfrey Goldsborough of Gloucester. Shortly afterwards, at Easter, his theological position was further endorsed in Cambridge when he was appointed Master of St Catharine's College, with the support of Whitgift. Thereafter he was occasionally chosen to give Lenten sermons before the queen, but he was not happy in the pulpit. He apparently found it "troublesome to speak English as a continued oration" after years of lecturing in Latin. John Manningham, a Magdalene graduate who would have heard Professor Overall in Cambridge, later complained that he "discoursed verry scholastically" when he preached a Whitehall sermon at the dead queen's court on 6 April 1603

In 1602, Overall was made rector of Algarkirk, Lincoln; he held the living for three years. With the support of Sir Fulke Greville he was nominated Dean of St Paul's Cathedral in London. On 6 June, Lawrence Barker, vicar of St Botolph Aldersgate, and a former colleague at Trinity spoke at Paul's Cross of the "gravity & learning and life" of the new dean. The Deanery itself became a haven for scholars like Scultetus who shared the house with him. Overall himself, according to the radical preacher Thomas Scott, emerged as something of an Anglo-Catholic. Overall was also granted the Prebendary of Tottenhall.

== King James I of England ==
In 1603 Overall received the rectory of Clothall, Hertfordshire (which he held till 1615), and in 1604 the rectory of Therfield, Hertfordshire (which he held till 1614); both were served by curates. At the Hampton Court Conference he spoke (16 January 1604) on the controversy concerning predestination, referring to the disputes in which he had been engaged at Cambridge, and won the approval of King James. Following the conference, Overall penned the new final portion of the Catechism within the 1604 Book of Common Prayer.

Overall, as Dean of St. Paul's, was present on 3 May 1606 in St Paul's Churchyard in London, for the hanging of Father Henry Garnet, Provincial of the Jesuits, from whom he tried unsuccessfully to extract a gallows recantation of Roman Catholicism. Garnet was charged with having a hand in the Gunpowder Plot. During the Convocation of 1610, John Overall's famous Convocation Book was sanctioned, although it was not published until much later. This treatise was "on the subject of Government, the divine institution of which was very positively asserted." In addition, the nature of the sacraments was described by Overall. The composition of the latter part of the Catechism, containing an explanation of the Sacraments, is generally attributed to John Overall. It was added in 1604 by royal authority, "by way of explanation," in compliance with a wish which the Puritans had expressed at the Conference at Hampton Court.

== Authorized Version of the Bible ==
Some time, perhaps on the final or third day of the Hampton Court Conference, a decision was made to make a new English translation of the Bible. Both the Crown and the puritans found fault with the bibles then in use. The work was carried on by 54 middle-aged, learned men. John Overall served as a translator (in the First Westminster Company) of the Authorized King James Version of the Bible. His name appears in the 1611 and 1613 printings, and he is associated with the translation of the chapters from Genesis to 2 Kings. During work on the Authorized Bible, Overall became a friend of Bishop Lancelot Andrewes (1555–1626), and the two were firm allies from then on, forming the Arminian wing of the Anglican church. Both Overall and Andrewes are considered early fathers of the Anglican Church, along with Thomas Cranmer, Matthew Parker, Richard Hooker, John Jewel, John Cosin, and William Laud. They discriminated and vindicated the Anglican position as opposed to both Papalism and Puritanism.

During the translating of the Bible, John Overall's beautiful young wife, Anne Overall (née Orwell), ran off with a Yorkshire courtier, Sir John Selby. Although John had her brought back to London, the scandal was well known. A popular verse of the day went like this, according to the great gossip John Aubrey:

The Dean of St Paul's did search for his wife
And where d'ye think he found her?
Even upon Sir John Selby's bed,
As flat as any flounder.

Anne Overall seems not to be mentioned after this incident. She was the subject of this suggestive rhyme, cited as evidence that she was too hot for intellectual John Overall to handle:

Face she had of filbert hue
And bosom’d like a swan.
Back she had of bended ewe
And waisted by a span.
Hair she had as black as crow
From her head unto her toe,
Down, down all over her,
Hey nonny, nonny no.

== Final years ==
John Overall also served on the Court of High Commission. The Court of High Commission was the supreme ecclesiastical court in England. It was instituted by the Crown during the English Reformation and finally dissolved by parliament in 1641. The Court was convened at will by the sovereign, and it had near unlimited power over civil as well as church matters. In the same way, Parliament could impeach bishops. In 1614, John Overall was appointed Bishop of Coventry and Lichfield, and was installed on 4 May.

On 16 November 1616, Marco Antonio de Dominis, Archbishop of Spalato in Dalmatia, being in a feud with his Roman Catholic superiors, came to England. At the King’s command, he was entertained in the household of the Archbishop of Canterbury. Bishop Overall, who was highly favoured by the king, was sent to meet the Roman Catholic Archbishop. The result of this intervention by Bishop Overall was that Marco Antonio de Dominis was created Dean of Windsor. On 14 December 1617 the Roman Catholic Archbishop of Spalato — who had been consecrated at Venice using the Tridentine Pontifical in October 1600 — assisted Archbishop George Abbot at the consecration of Nicholas Felton, and George Montaigne, elected, respectively, Bishops of Ely and of London, with the Bishop of Rochester, Bishop Overall, and Archbishop Spalato laying on hands. The participation of Spalato was a form of giving additional weight to the consecrations.

Two years later, Overall was translated to the See of Norwich as bishop. In the diary of senior Herald of the College of Arms, William Camden (1551–1623), the relevant entry stated:

13 March 1618. John Jegon, Bishop of Norwich, dies after occupying the See for fifteen years. He is succeeded by Overhall [sic], Bishop of Lechfield [sic], whose place is taken by Fenton, Bishop of Bristol.

John Overall died in 1619. The event failed to generate much notice from the royal court. William Camden’s diary entry only stated:

7 May 1619. Overall, Bishop of Norwich, by far the most learned, died. George Carleton and the Bishop of Chichester and others vie for his vacant See. Chichester prevails, and Carleton is transferred to Chichester.

While the cause of death of Overall was not recorded, it is known he died in his cathedral. There is also no record of the burial site of Overall's wife, Anne.

== Legacy ==
Overall is buried in the south choir aisle of Norwich Cathedral, and there is a monument to him in the presbytery of the cathedral in the second bay on the south side of the high altar. The memorial to Bishop Overall, with a coloured bust looking out from a niche above, bears the inscription "Vir undequaque doctissimus, et omni encomio major." The monument was placed there by his friend and former secretary, John Cosin, after his own elevation as bishop to the See of Durham. Cosin's later teaching of the Church of England on the Eucharist used the language of John Overall: "Corpus Christi sumitur a nobis sacramentaliter, spiritualiter, et realiter, sed non corporaliter." Cosin remembered his mentor as his "dear Lord and Master."

The monument in Norwich Cathedral ("with a little painted portrait and vulture-like dove of peace")was erected by Cosin many years after Overall's death. The portrait bust is copied directly from or comes from the same source as the portraits in the National Portrait Gallery that were done by Wenceslaus Hollar in 1657 from an unknown original. Several English cathedral libraries contain copies of various editions of Bishop John Overall's Convocation Book (1606 and 1610) and unpublished works by him are also housed in these collections, such as the undated Latin manuscript in the Cambridge library De statu questionum quinq' inter Remonstrantes et Contra-Remonstrantes Controversarum.

== Works ==
John Rainolds pleaded at the Hampton Court Conference for an enlargement of the church catechism of 1549. This was carried out in the same year by the addition of the section dealing with the sacraments. This section was Overall's work; with a slight revision in 1662, it remained as he left it.

Overall was elected prolocutor of the lower house in the Convocation of Canterbury on the elevation in March 1605 of Thomas Ravis to the see of Gloucester. In 1606 Convocation drew up canons and constitutions relating to civil government, with statements of the principles on which they were grounded. The suggestion of these canons proceeded from James I, who wanted moral support for his efforts in favour of the Dutch republic; and therefore asked of the clergy their "judgments how far a Christian and protestant king may concur to assist his neighbours to shake off their obedience to their own sovereign upon the account of oppression" (James's letter to Archbishop Abbot). In drawing up the canons, Convocation had in view the Gunpowder Plot and Catholic resistance theory. Thirty-six canons, forming the first book, were passed unanimously by both houses of convocation in both provinces. Two other books were passed unanimously by the lower house of the convocation of Canterbury, as is attested by Overall as prolocutor. King James then refused to sanction the first book, on the grounds of the doctrine laid down in canon xxviii. While absolutely denying to subjects the right of resistance, this canon nevertheless affirms that "new forms of government" originating in successful rebellion have divine authority. James thought this canon struck at his own title, as merely de facto and not de jure; and, further, that it gave the stamp of divine authority to proceedings in themselves evil. The canons accordingly passed out of sight for more than eighty years. A copy of the three books in Overall's hand came, at his death, into the possession of his secretary, John Cosin, who bequeathed it to the Cosin Library at Durham. The original manuscript of the first book passed at the death of Richard Bancroft, into Lambeth Palace Library, where it was noted by Laud. William Sancroft, was aware of the existence of Overall's manuscript; and in 1690, a few days before his suspension (1 August 1690), Sancroft published Overall's manuscript, collated with the Lambeth manuscript, under the title Bishop Overall's Convocation Book, MDCVI, concerning the Government of God's Catholick Church and the Kingdoms of the whole World, &c., 1690, with portraits of Overall and Sancroft, engraved by Robert White (reprinted in Library of Anglo-Catholic Theology, Oxford, 1844, with portrait of Overall). Against the history of the canons, Sancroft relied on their statement of the doctrine of non-resistance as justifying the attitude of the nonjurors.

Overall's Articles to be enquired of in the Diocese of Norwich in the Ordinarie Visitation, &c., Cambridge and London, 1619, exemplify his attempts to impose conformity in his diocese. The following further works by Overall were published posthumously:

- Articuli Lambethani ... annexa est ... Sententia ... de Prædestinatione, &c., 1631; 1651; the Sententia ... de Prædestinatione was reprinted 1694; 1696; 1700; 1720; translated in A Defence of the Thirty-nine Articles, 1700, originally by John Ellis. A manuscript from the time of the Synod of Dort, and dealing with the issue of predestination, was attributed to John Davenant by Thomas Bedford (1650); which was denied by George Kendall on the authority of James Ussher. It was published, attributed to Overall, in the 1651 edition of this work (editor F.G.).
- Another Latin manuscript by Overall, on the "five points" at dispute at the Synod of Dort, appeared in translation by John Plaifere (1651 in his Appello Evangelium) and in 1850 (in William Goode, The Doctrine of the Church of England as to the effects of Baptism in the case of Infants). It was cited in Joseph Hall's Via Media and Davenant's Animadversions upon a Treatise lately published by S. Hoard, and entitled "God's Love to mankind, manifested in disproving his absolute decree for their damnation" (1641).
- Quæstio utrum animæ Patrum ante Christum defunctorum fuerant in Cœlo, &c., in the Apparatus ad Origines Ecclesiasticas, &c., Oxford, 1635, by Richard Montagu; reprinted, with another treatise, as Prælectiones ... de Patrum, & Christi, Anima, et de Antichristo, &c., in The Doctrines of a Middle State, &c., 1721, by Archibald Campbell.

Overall was a correspondent of Gerard Voss and Hugo Grotius; some of his letters are in Præstantium ... Virorum Epistolæ, &c. According to Montagu, Voss derived from Overall materials for his Historiæ de Controversiis quas Pelagius ejusque reliquiæ moverunt libri septem, &c., Leyden, 1618.

== See also ==
- List of the Bishops of the Diocese of Norwich, England and its precursor offices

Academic offices
Preceded by William Whitaker	Regius Professor of Divinity at Cambridge; 1596–1606	Succeeded by John Richardson
Church of England titles
Preceded by Richard Neile	Bishop of Lichfield; 1614–1618	Succeeded by Thomas Morton
Preceded by John Jegon	Bishop of Norwich; 1618–1619	Succeeded by Samuel Harsnett
