= William Whitaker (theologian) =

English theologian (1548–1595)

The Reverend Canon William Whitaker DD
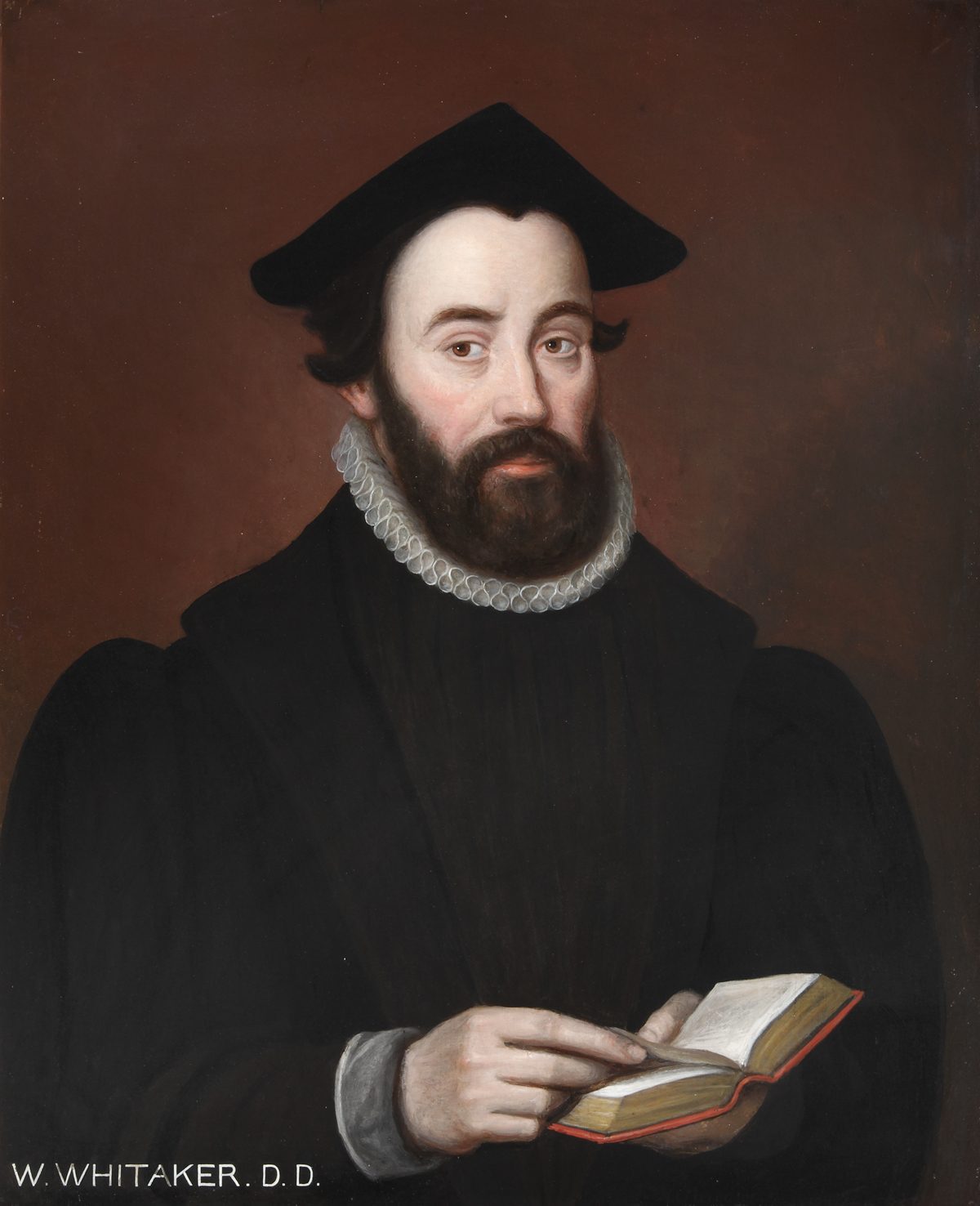
- William Whitaker
- Born: 1548; Holme, Lancashire
- Died: December 4, 1595; Cambridge, Cambridgeshire
- Education: Trinity College, Cambridge: (BA; MA); University of Oxford: (BD; DD)
- Occupations: Clergyman; Theologian
- Spouses: (1) Culverwell; (2) Joan Fenner
- Children: Alexander Whitaker Jabez Whitaker
- Parents: Thomas Whitaker; Elizabeth Nowell
- Relatives: Alexander Nowell (uncle)

Ecclesiastical career
- Religion: Christianity (Anglican)
- Church: Church of England
- Offices held: Canon of Norwich Cathedral (1577–8); Chancellor of St Paul's Cathedral (1580–7); Canon of Canterbury Cathedral (1595)

William Whitaker (1548 – 4 December 1595) was a prominent Protestant Reformed Anglican churchman, academic, and theologian who was Master of St. John's College, Cambridge, and a leading divine in the university in the latter half of the sixteenth century. His uncle was Alexander Nowell, the Dean of St Paul's Cathedral and catechist.

== Early life and education ==
Whitaker was born at Holme, near Burnley, Lancashire, in 1548, being the third son of Thomas Whitaker of Holme, by Elizabeth his wife, daughter of John Nowell, esq., of Read Hall, Read, Lancashire, and sister of Alexander Nowell, dean of St Paul's. After receiving the rudiments of learning at his native parish school, he was sent by his uncle, Alexander Nowell, to St Paul's School in London. (Alexander Nowell, a Marian exile, a fugitive from the "burning times" of Anglo-Italian policies, 1553–1558, was also a Protestant, Reformed and Anglican Churchman.) Whitaker thence proceeded to Cambridge, where he matriculated as a pensioner of Trinity College on 4 October 1564. He was subsequently elected a scholar on the same foundation, proceeded B.A. in March 1568, and on 6 September 1569 was elected to a minor fellowship, and on 25 March 1571 to a major fellowship, at his college. In 1571 he commenced M.A. Throughout his earlier career at the university he was assisted by his uncle, who granted him leases, "freely and without fine," towards defraying his expenses. Whitaker evinced his gratitude by dedicating to Nowell a translation of the Book of Common Prayer into Greek, and a like version of Nowell's own larger catechism from the Latin into Greek.

== Academic career ==
The marked ability with which he acquitted himself when presiding as "father of the philosophy act" at an academic commencement appears to have first brought him prominently into notice. He also became known as an indefatigable student of the scriptures, the commentators, and the schoolmen, and was very early in his career singled out by John Whitgift, at that time master of Trinity, for marks of special favour. On 3 February 1578 he was installed canon of Norwich Cathedral, and in the same year was admitted to the degree of B.D., and incorporated on 14 July at Oxford. In 1580 he was appointed by the crown to the Regius Professorship of Divinity at the University of Cambridge, to which Elizabeth shortly after added the chancellorship of St. Paul's Cathedral, London, and from this time his position as the champion of the teaching of the Protestant and Reformed Church of England appears to have been definitely taken up. In 1582, on taking part in a disputation at commencement, he took for his thesis, Pontifex Romanus est ille Antichristus, quern futurum Scriptura prædixit, or, The Roman Pope is that Antichrist which the Scriptures Foretold. His lectures, as professor, afterwards published from shorthand notes taken by John Allenson, a fellow of St. John's, were mainly directed towards refuting Roman Catholic theologians, especially Robert Bellarmine and Thomas Stapleton. He also severely criticised the just-published Rheims version of the New Testament, thereby becoming involved in a controversy with William Rainolds.

His work, Disputatio de Sacra Scriptura contra hujus temporis papistas, inprimis Robertum Bellarminum, or Disputations on Holy Scripture, remains one of the premier volumes on the doctrine of Scripture, often under-appreciated, little read, but standing like a titan amongst the volumes of the English Reformed Churchman. One of the premier issues that divided and still divides informed Protestants from Roman Catholics is the question of the place of Scripture. Reformed Churchmen like Whitaker, then like now, declared that the Scriptures alone are the rule of faith and practice whereas Roman Catholics assert co-equal veneration and co-authoritative roles between Scripture, traditions held by the Church and other unwritten issues. This debate is not new. William Whitaker forcefully and brilliantly championed the Protestant, Reformed and Anglican position in 1588. He deals with the number of canonical books, the authority of Scripture, the perspicuity (clarity) of Scripture, the proper interpretation of Scripture, and the perfection of Scripture against unwritten traditions.

On 28 February 1586, Whitaker, on the recommendation of Whitgift and Burghley, was appointed by the crown to the mastership of St. John's College, Cambridge. The appointment was, however, opposed by a majority of the fellows on the ground of his supposed leanings towards puritanism. His rule as an administrator justified in almost equal measure the appointment and its objectors. The college increased greatly in numbers and reputation, but the puritan party gained ground considerably in the society. Whitaker was a no less resolute opponent of Lutheranism than of Roman doctrine and ritual.

In the discharge of his ordinary duties as master his assiduity and strict impartiality in distributing the rewards at his disposal conciliated even those who demurred to his theological teaching, and Baker declares that the members of the college were "all at last united in their affection to their master," and that eventually "he had no enemies to overcome."

In 1587 he was created D.D.; and in 1593, on the mastership of Trinity College falling vacant by the preferment of Dr. John Still to the bishopric of Bath and Wells, he was an unsuccessful candidate for the post. In the following year he published his De Authoritate Scripturæ, written in reply to Stapleton, prefixing to it a dedication to Whitgift (18 April 1594), the latter affording a noteworthy illustration of his personal relations with the primate, and also of the Roman controversialist learning of that time. In May 1595 he was installed canon of Canterbury; but his professorship, mastership, and canonry appear to have left him still poor, and in a letter to Burghley, written about a fortnight before his death, he complains pathetically at being so frequently passed over amid "the great preferments of soe many." He may possibly have been suffering from dejection at this time, owing to the disagreement with Whitgift in which, in common with others of the Cambridge heads, he found himself involved in connection with the prosecution of William Barret. In November 1595 he was deputed, along with Humphrey Gower, president of Queens' College, Cambridge, to confer with the primate on the drawing up of the Lambeth Articles. On this occasion he appears to have pressed his Calvinistic views warmly, but without success, and he returned to Cambridge fatigued and disappointed. He fell ill and died on 4 December 1595.

== Legacy ==
No English divine of the sixteenth century surpassed Whitaker in the estimation of his contemporaries. Ralph Churton justly styles him "the pride and ornament of Cambridge." Bellarmine so much admired his genius and attainments that he had his portrait suspended in his study. Joseph Scaliger, Joseph Hall, and Isaac Casaubon alike speak of him in terms of almost unbounded admiration.

== Portraits ==
In 1900, there were two portraits of Whitaker in the master's lodge at St. John's College (one in the drawing-room, the other in the hall), both bearing the words, "Dr. Whitaker, Mr. 1587," and one at the Chetham Hospital and Library, Manchester. His portrait was engraved by William Marshall in Thomas Fuller's Holy State, 1642, and by John Payne. His epitaph, in Latin hexameters on a marble tablet, has been placed on the north wall of the interior of the transept of the college chapel.

== Family ==
His hopes of preferment were disappointed, probably because he was twice married, and thus forfeited in some measure the favour of Elizabeth. The maiden name of his first wife, who was sister-in-law to Laurence Chaderton, was Culverwell; his second wife, who survived him, was the widow of Dudley Fenner. He had eight children: one of the sons, Alexander Whitaker, who was educated at Trinity College, afterwards became known as the "Apostle of Virginia." Alexander baptised Pocahontas. Another son who set his eyes on America was Jabez. He was one of the first planters in Jamestown and helped build a guest house to greet new families to Virginia.

== Works ==
The following is a list of Whitaker's published works:

- Liber Precum Publicarum Ecclesiae Anglicanæ . . . Latine Græceque æditus, London, 1569.
- Greek verses appended to Carr's 'Demosthenes,' 1571.
- Κατηχισμός, ... τἢτε 'Ελλήνων καὶ τἢ 'Ρωμαίων διαλέκτῳ ὲκδοθεἷσα, London, 1573, 1574, 1578, 1673 (the Greek version is by Whitaker, the Latin by Alexander Nowell).
- Ioannis Iuelli Sarisbur ... adversus Thomam Hardingum volumen alterum ex Anglico sermone conversum in Latinum a Gulielmo Whitakero, London, 1578.
- Ad decem rationes Edmundi Campiani ... Christiana responsio, London, 1581; a translation of this by Richard Stock was printed in London in 1606. (Note: included in the edition of his theological treatises reprinted by Samuel Crispin at Geneva in two volumes, folio, in 1610)
- Thesis proposita ... in Academia Cantabrigiensi die Comitiorum anno Domini 1582; cujus summa hæc, Pontifex Romanus est ille Antichristus, London, 1582.
- Responsionis ... defensio contra confutationem Ioannis Duraei Scoti, presbyteri Iesuitse, London, 1583.
- Nicolai Sanderi quadraginta demonstrationes, Quod Papa non-est Antichristus ille insignis ... et earundem demonstrationum solida refutatio, London, 1583.
- Fragmenta veterum haereseon ad constituendam Ecclesiæ Pontificiae ἀποστασίαν collecta, London, 1583.
- An aunswere to a certaine Booke, written by M. William Rainoldes ... entituled A Refutation, London, 1585; Cambridge, 1590.
- Disputatio de Sacra Scriptura contra hujus temporis papistas, inprimis Robertum Bellarminum ... et Thomam Stapletonum ... sex quæstionibus proposita et tractata, Cambridge, 1588.
- Adversus Tho. Stapletoni Anglopapistæ ... defensionem ecclesiasticæ authoritatis ... duplicatio pro authoritate atque αύτοπιστίᾳ S. Scripturæ, Cambridge, 1594.
- Praelectiones in quibus tractatur controversia de ecclesia contra pontificios, inprimis Robertum Bellarminum Iesuitam, in septem qusestiones distributa, Cambridge, 1599. Edited by John Allenson.
- Cygnea cantio ... hoc est, ultima illius concio ad clerum, habita Cantabrigiæ anno 1595, ix Oct. Cambridge, 1599.
- Controversia de Conciliis, contra pontificios, inprimis Robertum Bellarminum Iesuitam, in sex quaestiones distributa, Cambridge, 1600.
- Tractatus de peccato originali ... contra Stapletonum, Cambridge, 1600.
- Prælectiones in controversiam de Romano Pontifice ... adversus pontificios, inprimis Robertum Bellarminum, Hanau, 1608.
- Praelectiones aliquot contra Bellarminum habitæ (in Conr. Decker De Proprietatibus Iesuitarum, Oppenheim, 1611).
- Adversus universalis gratiæ assertores prælectio in 1 Tim. ii. 4 (in Pet. Baro's Summa Triurn de Prædestinatione Sententiarum, Harderwyk, 1613).
- Prælectiones de Sacramentis in Genere et in Specie de. SS. Baptismo et Eucharistia, Frankfort, 1624.
- Articuli de prædestinatione ... Lambethæ propositi, et L. Andrews de iisdem Iudicium, London, 1651.

Other works by Whitaker are extant in manuscript; the Bodleian Library has Commentarii in Cantica, and Prælectiones in priorem Epistolam ad Corinthios by him; Gonville and Caius College Cambridge has Theses: de fide Davidis; de Prædestinatione; and St. John's College, Cambridge, a treatise on ecclesiastical polity, which Baker thinks was probably from his pen, although it leans somewhat to Erastianism.

Notes

Academic offices
Preceded by William Chaderton	Regius Professor of Divinity at Cambridge; 1580–1595	Succeeded by John Overall
Preceded by Richard Howland	Master of St John's College, Cambridge; 1587–1595	Succeeded by Richard Clayton
