= Laurence Chaderton =

English Puritan divine (died 1640)

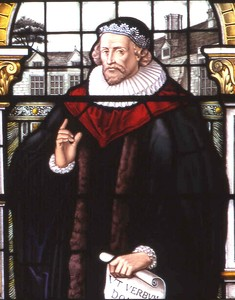
- Laurence Chaderton
- Born: c. 1536; Lees or Chadderton, Oldham
- Died: 13 November 1640
- Occupation: English bible translator

Laurence Chaderton (c. September 1536 – 13 November 1640) was an English Puritan divine, the first Master of Emmanuel College, Cambridge and one of the translators of the King James Version of the Bible.

== Life ==
Chaderton was born in Lees, or else Chadderton, both near Oldham, Lancashire, England, probably during September 1536, a son of Thomas Chaderton, a Catholic. His birth preceded the institution of parish baptism registers in England in 1538.

Under the tuition of Laurence Vaux, a Roman Catholic priest, he became an able scholar. In 1564, he entered Christ's College, Cambridge, where, after a short time, he formally adopted the Reformed doctrines and was in consequence disinherited by his father. In 1567, he was elected a fellow of his college; subsequently, he was chosen lecturer of St Clement's Church, Cambridge, where he preached to admiring audiences for many years. He married Cecily Culverwell, which entailed giving up his fellowship.

He was a man of moderate, puritan views, though numbering among his friends some of the greatest Puritan preachers and divines like Thomas Cartwright, Richard Greenham, Richard Rogers, and William Perkins. So great was his reputation that when Sir Walter Mildmay, Chancellor of the Exchequer to Elizabeth I, founded Emmanuel College, Cambridge in 1584, he chose Chaderton for the first master, and on his expressing some reluctance, declared that if he would not accept the office the foundation should not go on.

In 1604, Chaderton was appointed one of the four divines for managing the cause of the Puritans at the Hampton Court Conference. He was also among the translators of the King James Version of the Bible. In 1578, he had taken the degree of B.D., and in 1613, he was created D.D. At this period he made provision for twelve fellows and above forty scholars in Emmanuel College. Fearing that he might have a successor who held Arminian doctrines, he resigned the mastership in favour of John Preston in 1622, but survived him, and lived also to see the college presided over successively by William Sancroft and Richard Holdsworth. He died at the age of about 104, preserving his bodily and mental faculties to the end.

== Works ==
Chaderton published a sermon preached at St Paul's Cross about 1580, and a treatise of his On Justification was printed by Anthony Thysius, professor of divinity at Leiden. Some other works by him on theological subjects remained in manuscript, at least as of 1911.

Academic offices
Preceded by New title	Master of Emmanuel College, Cambridge; 1584–1622	Succeeded by John Preston
