= William Barret =

English divine

William Barret (fl. 1595) was an English divine.

== Life ==
=== Education ===
He matriculated as a pensioner of Trinity College, Cambridge, on 1 February 1579–80. He proceeded to his M.A. degree in 1588, and was soon afterwards elected fellow of Caius College.

=== Preaching controversy ===
On 29 April 1595, he preached a Concio ad Clerum, for the degree of B.D. at Church of St Mary the Great, Cambridge; during this sermon he violently attacked the Calvinist tenets, then popular at Cambridge. While rejecting the doctrine of assurance and of the indefectibility of grace, he spoke of Calvin, Peter Martyr, and other believers in unconditioned reprobation. He also spoke against William Perkins’ writings, Armilla Aurea (1590) and Exposition of the Apostles’ Creed (1595).

This public attack was not allowed to pass unnoticed. The vice-chancellor, Dr. Dupont, conferred privately with Barret, who, however, remained contumacious, and was next summoned before the heads of colleges. After several conferences, in which Barret acknowledged the justice of the inferences drawn from his sermon, he was ordered to recant. He accordingly read a prescribed form of withdrawal at St. Mary's, on 10 May 1595, but in an "unreverend manner", significant of his unchanged views. On the 20th, almost sixty dons petitioned the vice-chancellor in favour of Barret's punishment.

Once more he was summoned before the heads of colleges, and threatened with expulsion. However, taking advantage of a libellous account of his sermon circulated by the authorities of St. John's, he appealed to Archbishop Whitgift, a course also adopted by his accusers. The primate, in reply, censured the hasty proceedings of the heads of colleges, who upon this appealed to Lord Burghley, their chancellor, asking permission to punish Barret. The chancellor at first gave his assent, which he withdrew at the request of Whitgift.

The heads now saw that they had gone too far, and in the month of September wrote to the primate, begging that he would settle the matter by inquiry into Barret's opinions. The accused was therefore summoned to Lambeth Palace, and required to answer certain questions sent down from Cambridge. At a second meeting, he was confronted with a deputation headed by Whitaker, and at last consented to make another recantation. This seems to have been done after many delays. In March 1597, the archbishop warned the authorities that Barret was contemplating flight; but he had set out before the letter reached them.

=== Later life ===
Whilst on the continent Barret embraced the Roman Catholic faith. He eventually returned to England, where he lived as a layman till his death.

== Legacy ==
The fruit of this controversy is seen in the so-called Lambeth Articles. Barret is by some identified with the publisher, who prefixed a letter to his own edition of Robert Southwell's works, entitled St. Peter's Complainte, Mary Magdal Teares, with other works of the author, R. S., London, 1620 and 1630.
