= List of vice-chancellors of the University of Cambridge =

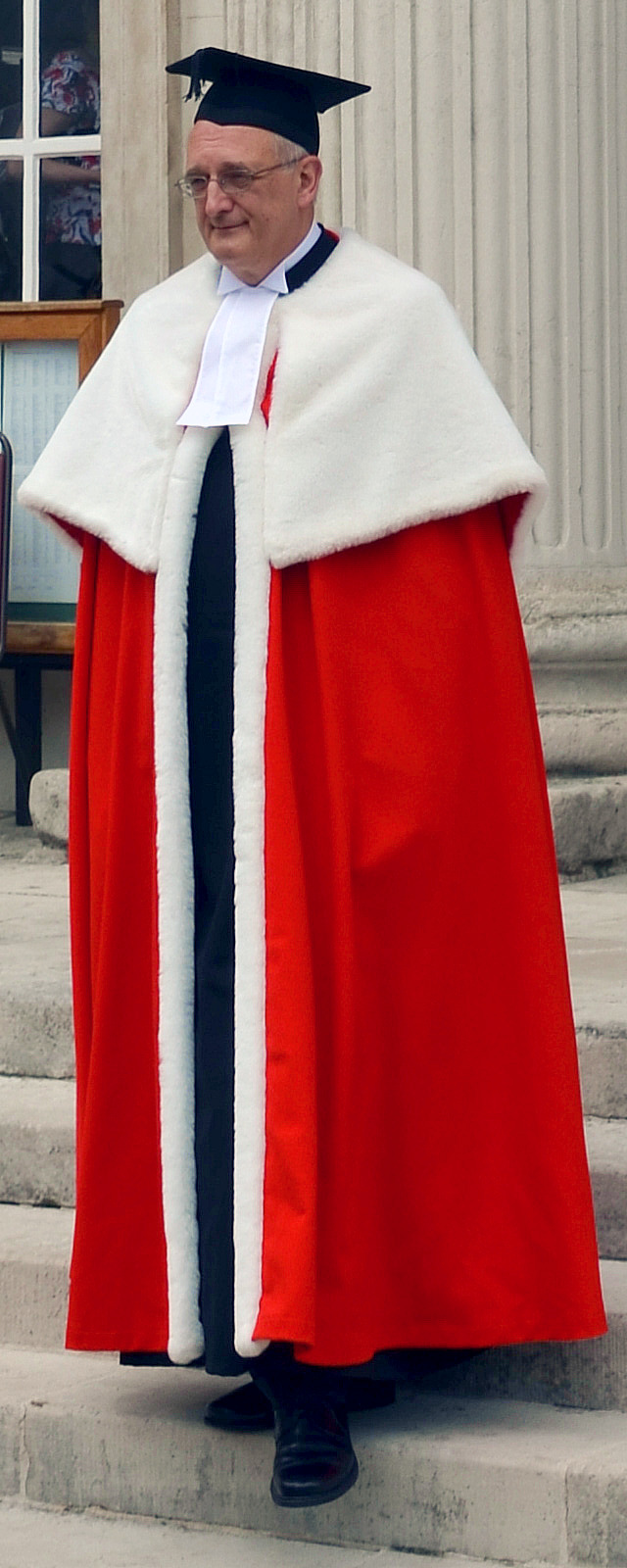
The 345th vice-chancellor, Sir Leszek Borysiewicz, in academic dress, after conferring degrees at the Senate House in July 2014

The vice-chancellor of the University of Cambridge (formally known as The Right Worshipful the Vice-Chancellor) is the main administrative and academic officer of the university, and is elected by the Regent House for a term of up to seven years. Since July 2023, the vice-chancellor has been Deborah Prentice.

Prior to 1992, the position was part-time, the post-holder having other college and faculty duties. In fact, between 1587 and 1992 all holders were concurrently Masters of one of the university's colleges. Until the late nineteenth century, the term was generally one year, though this was extended to two years until the post became full-time in 1992.

Since 2003, the vice-chancellor has been assisted by five pro-vice-chancellors. For the year 2007–2008, Alison Richard was paid "£227,000 in salary and perks." In 2017–2018, Vice-Chancellor Stephen Toope earned a basic salary of £431,000, a significant increase from his predecessor's salary of £343,000. Times Higher Education reported in January 2025 that the current vice-chancellor (Deborah Prentice) had a basic salary for £409,000 with an additional £51,741 of accommodation and personal allowances.

== Vice-chancellors ==
=== 15th century ===
- 1412 Thomas Ashwell
- 1417 Henry Stockton
- 1418 Nicholas de Swaffham
- 1454 Nicholas Gay
- 1457 William Millington
- 1463 John Roclyffe
- 1465 Thomas Stoyle
- 1467 William Uttyng
- 1468 William Smyth
- 1470 Edmund Conisborough
- 1472 Thomas Stoyle
- 1475 William Towne
- 1485 Thomas Tuppin
- 1487 John Riplingham
- 1489 John Camberton
- 1493 William Rawson
- 1494 William Stockdale
- 1495 John Dolman (or Dowman)
- 1496 Henry Rudd
- 1497 John Smith
- 1499 John Smith
- 1500 Henry Babington

=== 16th century ===
- 1501 John Fisher
- 1502 Humphrey Fitzwilliam
- 1503 Geoffrey Knight
- 1504 John Smith
- 1505 Richard Burton
- 1506 John Eccleston
- 1507 William Robson
- 1508 William Buckenham
- 1510 Thomas Thompson
- 1512 John Fawne
- 1514 John Eccleston
- 1516 Robert Dowsing (or Dussing)
- 1517 Edmund Natares (or Natures)
- 1518 John Watson
- 1520 Edmund Natares (or Natures)
- 1521 Thomas Stackhouse
- 1522 John Edmunds
- 1523 Thomas Green
- 1524 Henry Bullock
- 1525 Edmund Natares (or Natures)
- 1527 John Edmunds
- 1529 William Buckmaster
- 1530 John Watson
- 1532 Simon Heynes
- 1534 John Crayford
- 1536 Francis Mallet
- 1537 George Day
- 1538 William Buckmaster
- 1540 John Edmunds
- 1540 Francis Mallet
- 1541 Richard Standish
- 1542 John Edmunds
- 1542 Richard Standish
- 1543 John Edmunds
- 1543 Sir Thomas Smith
- 1545 John Madew
- 1545 Matthew Parker
- 1546 John Madew
- 1548 William Bill
- 1548 Matthew Parker
- 1549 Walter Haddon
- 1550 John Madew
- 1551 Andrew Perne
- 1552 Edward Hawford
- 1552 Edwin Sandys (ejected)
- 1553 John Young
- 1554 William Glyn
- 1554 Cuthbert Scott
- 1556 Andrew Perne
- 1556 John Pory
- 1557 Robert Brassey
- 1558 Edmund Cosyn
- 1559 Andrew Perne
- 1560 Henry Harvey
- 1561 Philip Baker
- 1562 Francis Newton
- 1563 Edward Hawford
- 1564 Robert Beaumont
- 1565 John Stokes
- 1566 Robert Beaumont
- 1567 Roger Kelke
- 1567 Richard Longworth
- 1568 John Young
- 1569 John May
- 1570 John Whitgift
- 1571 Roger Kelke
- 1572 Thomas Bynge
- 1573 John Whitgift
- 1574 Andrew Perne
- 1575 John Still
- 1576 Roger Goad
- 1577 Richard Howland
- 1578 Thomas Bynge
- 1579 John Hatcher
- 1580 Andrew Perne
- 1581 William Fulke
- 1582 John Bell
- 1583 Richard Howland
- 1584 Robert Norgate
- 1585 Humphrey Tindall
- 1586 John Copcot
- 1587 Thomas Legge
- 1588 Thomas Nevile
- 1589 Thomas Preston
- 1590 Robert Some
- 1592 Thomas Legge
- 1592 John Still
- 1593 John Duport
- 1595 Roger Goad
- 1596 John Jegon
- 1599 Robert Some
- 1600 John Jegon

=== 17th century ===
- 1601 John Duport
- 1602 William Smith
- 1603 John Cowell
- 1605 Richard Clayton
- 1606 Samuel Harsnett
- 1607 Roger Goad
- 1608 Thomas Jegon
- 1609 John Duport
- 1610 Fogge Newton
- 1611 Barnabas Gooch (or Goche)
- 1612 Valentine Cary
- 1613 Clement Corbet
- 1614 Samuel Harsnett
- 1615 Owen Gwyn
- 1616 John Hills
- 1617 John Richardson
- 1618 William Branthwaite
- 1618 John Gostlin
- 1619 Robert Scott
- 1620 Samuel Ward
- 1621 Leonard Mawe
- 1622 Jerome Beale
- 1623 Thomas Paske
- 1624 John Mansell
- 1625 John Gostlin
- 1625 Henry Smyth
- 1627 Thomas Bainbridge
- 1628 Matthew Wren
- 1629 Henry Butts
- 1631 Thomas Comber
- 1632 Benjamin Lany
- 1633 Richard Love
- 1634 William Beale
- 1635 Henry Smyth
- 1636 Thomas Comber
- 1637 Ralph Brownrigg
- 1639 John Cosin
- 1640 Richard Holdsworth
- 1643 Ralph Brownrigg
- 1645 Thomas Hill
- 1647 John Arrowsmith
- 1648 Anthony Tuckney
- 1649 Thomas Horton
- 1650 Benjamin Whichcote
- 1651 Samuel Bolton
- 1652 Richard Minshall
- 1653 Lazarus Seaman
- 1654 John Lightfoot
- 1655 Theophilus Dillingham
- 1657 John Worthington
- 1658 John Bond
- 1659 William Dillingham
- 1660 Henry Ferne
- 1661 Henry Ferne
- 1662 Edward Rainbowe
- 1662 William Dillingham
- 1663 James Fleetwood
- 1664 Anthony Sparrow
- 1665 Francis Wilford
- 1666 John Howorth (or Haworth)
- 1667 James Fleetwood
- 1668 Edmund Boldero
- 1669 James Duport
- 1670 John Breton
- 1671 Robert Mapletoft
- 1672 William Wells
- 1673 John Spencer
- 1674 Edmund Boldero
- 1675 Isaac Barrow
- 1676 Sir Thomas Page
- 1677 Thomas Holbech
- 1678 Francis Turner
- 1679 John Eachard
- 1680 Humphrey Gower
- 1681 Nathaniel Coga
- 1682 John Coplestone
- 1683 Henry James
- 1684 Samuel Blyth
- 1685 William Saywell
- 1686 John Peachell
- 1687 John Balderston
- 1687 Hon. John Mountague
- 1688 John Covel
- 1689 James Johnson
- 1690 Charles Roderick
- 1691 Gabriel Quadring
- 1692 George Oxenden
- 1693 William Stanley
- 1694 Thomas Browne
- 1695 John Eachard
- 1696 Henry James
- 1698 Sir William Dawes
- 1699 Thomas Green
- 1700 Richard Bentley

=== 18th century ===
- 1701 Thomas Richardson
- 1702 Charles Ashton
- 1703 George Bramston
- 1704 Sir John Ellys
- 1705 Bardsey Fisher
- 1706 John Balderston
- 1707 Edward Lany
- 1708 John Covel
- 1709 Charles Roderick
- 1710 Sir Nathaniel Lloyd
- 1711 Gabriel Quadring
- 1712 John Adams
- 1713 Thomas Green
- 1714 Thomas Sherlock
- 1715 Daniel Waterland
- 1716 William Grigg
- 1717 Sir Thomas Gooch
- 1720 Thomas Crosse
- 1722 Andrew Snape
- 1724 William Savage
- 1725 John Davies
- 1726 Joseph Craven
- 1727 Robert Lambert
- 1728 John Frankland
- 1729 Robert Lambert
- 1730 Matthias Mawson
- 1732 Charles Morgan
- 1733 Roger Long
- 1734 William Towers
- 1735 John Adams
- 1736 John Wilcox
- 1737 William Richardson
- 1738 John Whalley
- 1739 Edward Hubbard
- 1740 Sir Edward Simpson
- 1741 William Sedgwick
- 1742 Robert Smith
- 1743 William George
- 1744 Kenrick Prescot
- 1745 George Henry Rooke
- 1746 Edmund Castle
- 1747 Francis Sawyer Parris
- 1748 Thomas Chapman
- 1749 Edmund Keene
- 1751 John Wilcox
- 1752 Philip Yonge
- 1754 Hugh Thomas
- 1755 Edmund Law
- 1756 John Sumner
- 1757 John Green
- 1758 Lynford Caryl
- 1759 Sir James Burrough
- 1760 George Sandby
- 1761 Robert Plumptre
- 1762 Peter Godard
- 1763 William Elliston
- 1764 John Barnardiston
- 1765 William Samuel Powell
- 1766 John Smith
- 1767 Sir James Marriott
- 1768 John Hinchliffe
- 1769 William Richardson
- 1770 John Sumner
- 1771 James Brown
- 1772 William Cooke
- 1773 Lynford Caryl
- 1774 Hon. Barton Wallop
- 1775 Richard Farmer
- 1776 John Chevalier
- 1777 Hugh Thomas
- 1777 Robert Plumptre
- 1778 William Colman
- 1779 Lowther Yates
- 1780 John Barker
- 1781 Richard Beadon
- 1783 John Torkington
- 1784 Peter Peckard
- 1785 Joseph Turner
- 1786 Sir James Marriott
- 1786 William Elliston
- 1787 Richard Farmer
- 1788 Francis Barnes
- 1789 William Pearce
- 1790 William Craven
- 1791 Thomas Postlethwaite
- 1792 Isaac Milner
- 1793 William Colman
- 1794 Lowther Yates
- 1795 Philip Douglas
- 1796 Richard Belward
- 1797 Robert Cory
- 1798 Humphrey Sumner
- 1799 William Lort Mansel
- 1800 William Gretton

=== 19th century ===
- 1801 Joseph Proctor (or Procter)
- 1802 Humphrey Sumner
- 1803 Martin Davy
- 1804 John Torkington
- 1805 Joseph Turner
- 1806 William Pearce
- 1807 Francis Barnes
- 1808 Edward Pearson
- 1809 Isaac Milner
- 1810 Philip Douglas
- 1811 Thomas Browne
- 1812 John Davie
- 1813 Robert Cory
- 1813 William Chafy
- 1814 George Thackeray
- 1815 John Kaye
- 1816 James Wood
- 1817 William Webb
- 1818 Hon. George Neville
- 1819 William Frere
- 1820 Christopher Wordsworth
- 1821 William French
- 1822 Henry Godfrey
- 1823 John Lamb
- 1824 Thomas Le Blanc
- 1825 Joseph Proctor (or Procter)
- 1826 Christopher Wordsworth
- 1827 Martin Davy
- 1828 Gilbert Ainslie
- 1829 William Chafy
- 1830 George Thackeray
- 1831 John Graham
- 1832 William Webb
- 1833 Joshua King
- 1834 William French
- 1835 George Archdall
- 1836 Gilbert Ainslie
- 1837 Thomas Worsley
- 1838 William Hodgson
- 1839 Ralph Tatham
- 1840 John Graham
- 1841 George Archdall
- 1842 William Whewell
- 1843 William Hodgson
- 1844 Robert Phelps
- 1845 Ralph Tatham
- 1846 Henry Philpott
- 1847 Robert Phelps
- 1848 Henry Wilkinson Cookson
- 1849 James Cartmell
- 1850 George Elwes Corrie
- 1851 Richard Okes
- 1852 James Pulling
- 1853 Thomas Charles Geldart
- 1854 Edwin Guest
- 1855 William Whewell
- 1856 Henry Philpott
- 1858 William Henry Bateson
- 1859 Latimer Neville, 6th Baron Braybrooke
- 1861 George Phillips
- 1862 Edward Atkinson
- 1863 Henry Wilkinson Cookson
- 1865 James Cartmell
- 1867 William Hepworth Thompson
- 1868 Edward Atkinson
- 1870 John Power
- 1872 Henry Wilkinson Cookson
- 1874 Samuel Phear
- 1876 Edward Atkinson
- 1878 John Power
- 1879 Edward Perowne
- 1881 James Porter
- 1884 Norman McLeod Ferrers
- 1885 Charles Anthony Swainson
- 1886 Charles Taylor
- 1888 Charles Edward Searle
- 1889 Henry Montagu Butler
- 1891 John Peile
- 1893 Augustus Austen Leigh
- 1895 Charles Smith
- 1897 Alexander Hill
- 1899 William Chawner

=== 20th century ===
- 1901 Sir Adolphus Ward, Master of Peterhouse
- 1902 Frederick Henry Chase, President of Queens'
- 1904 Edward Anthony Beck, Master of Trinity Hall
- 1906 Ernest Stewart Roberts, Master of Caius
- 1908 Arthur James Mason, Master of Pembroke
- 1910 Robert Forsyth Scott, Master of St John's
- 1912 Stuart Alexander Donaldson, Master of Magdalene (resigned)
- 1913 Montague Rhodes James, Provost of King's
- 1915 Thomas Fitzpatrick, President of Queens'
- 1917 Sir Arthur Everett Shipley, Master of Christ's
- 1919 Peter Giles, Master of Emmanuel
- 1921 Edmund Courtenay Pearce, Master of Corpus
- 1924 Sir Albert Seward, Master of Downing
- 1926 George Weekes, Master of St John's
- 1928 Thomas Fitzpatrick, President of Queens'
- 1929 Allen Beville Ramsay, Master of Magdalene
- 1931 William Spens, Master of Corpus
- 1933 J. F. Cameron, Master of Caius
- 1935 Godfrey Wilson, Master of Clare
- 1937 Henry Roy Dean, Master of Trinity Hall
- 1939 Ernest Alfred Benians, Master of St John's
- 1941 John Archibald Venn, President of Queens'
- 1943 Thomas Shirley Hele, Master of Emmanuel
- 1945 Henry Thirkill, Master of Clare
- 1947 Charles Earle Raven, Master of Christ's
- 1949 Sydney Castle Roberts, Master of Pembroke
- 1951 Sir Lionel Whitby, Master of Downing
- 1953 Henry Willink, Master of Magdalene
- 1955 Brian Downs, Master of Christ's
- 1957 Edgar Adrian, Master of Trinity
- 1959 Sir Herbert Butterfield, Master of Peterhouse
- 1961 Sir Ivor Jennings, Master of Trinity Hall
- 1963 John Boys Smith, Master of St John's
- 1965 Arthur Armitage, President of Queens'
- 1967 Sir Eric Ashby, Master of Clare
- 1969 Rev'd Owen Chadwick, Master of Selwyn
- 1971 William Alexander Deer, Master of Trinity Hall
- 1973 Jack Linnett, Master of Sidney
- 1975 Dame Rosemary Murray, President of New Hall
- 1977 Sir Alan Cottrell, Master of Jesus
- 1979 Sir Peter Swinnerton-Dyer, Master of St Catharine's
- 1981 Sir Harry Hinsley, Master of St John's
- 1983 Sir John Butterfield, Master of Downing
- 1985 Richard Adrian, 2nd Baron Adrian, Master of Pembroke
- 1987 Michael McCrum, Master of Corpus
- 1989 Sir David Williams, President of Wolfson

=== Full-time vice-chancellors ===
- 1992 Sir David Williams
- 1996 Sir Alec Broers
- 2003 Dame Alison Richard
- 2010 Sir Leszek Borysiewicz
- 2017 Stephen Toope
- 2022 Anthony Freeling (acting)
- 2023 Deborah Prentice

== See also ==
- List of chancellors of the University of Cambridge
- List of vice-chancellors of the University of Oxford
