= List of masters of St John's College, Cambridge =

A list of masters of St John's College, Cambridge.

№	Name	Portrait	Term of office	
1	Robert Shorton		9 April 1511	July 1516
2	Alan Percy		July 1516	November 1518
3	Nicholas Metcalfe		December 1518	4 July 1537
4	George Day		27 July 1537	6 June 1538
5	John Taylor		4 July 1538	1546
6	William Bill		10 March 1546	10 December 1551
7	Thomas Lever		10 December 1551	1553
8	Thomas Watson		28 September 1553	1554
9	George Bullock		12 May 1554	20 July 1559
10	James Pilkington		20 July 1559	1561
11	Leonard Pilkington		19 October 1561	1564
12	Richard Longworth		11 May 1564	1569
13	Nicholas Shepherd		17 December 1569	1574
14	John Still		21 July 1574	1577
15	Richard Howland		21 July 1577	1587
16	William Whitaker		25 February 1587	4 December 1595†
17	Richard Clayton		22 December 1595	2 May 1612†
18	Owen Gwyn		16 May 1612	June 1633† (buried 5 June 1633)
19	William Beale		20 February 1634	1644
20	John Arrowsmith		11 April 1644	May 1653
21	Anthony Tuckney		3 June 1653	1661
22	Peter Gunning		5 June 1661	6 March 1670
23	Francis Turner		11 April 1670	1679
24	Humphrey Gower		3 December 1679	27 March 1711†
25	Robert Jenkin		13 April 1711	7 April 1727†
26	Robert Lambert		21 April 1727	24 January 1735†
27	John Newcome		6 February 1735	10 January 1765†
28	William Samuel Powell		25 January 1765	19 January 1775†
29	John Chevallier		1 February 1775	14 March 1789†
30	William Craven		29 March 1789	28 January 1815†
31	James Wood		11 February 1815	23 April 1839†
32	Ralph Tatham		7 May 1839	19 January 1857†
33	William Henry Bateson		2 February 1857	27 March 1881†
34	Charles Taylor		12 April 1881	12 August 1908†
35	Sir Robert Forsyth Scott		21 August 1908	18 November 1933†
36	Ernest Alfred Benians		7 December 1933	13 February 1952†
37	James Mann Wordie		13 December 1952	1959
38	John Boys Smith		1959	1969
39	Nicholas Mansergh		1 October 1969	12 July 1979
40	Sir Harry Hinsley		1979	31 July 1989
41	Robert Hinde		1989	1994
42	Peter Goddard		1994	5 January 2004
43	Richard Perham		5 January 2004	30 September 2007
44	Chris Dobson		October 2007	8 September 2019
45	Heather Hancock		1 October 2020	-

Dates for masters up to 13 Dec 1952 are taken from

Many of the later dates are taken from the college magazine, The Eagle
