= List of masters of Jesus College, Cambridge =

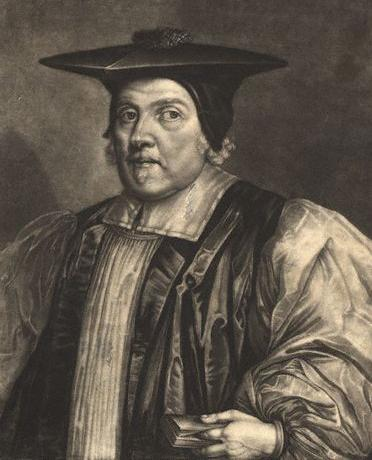
Richard Sterne, Archbishop of York and Master from 1634 to 1644.

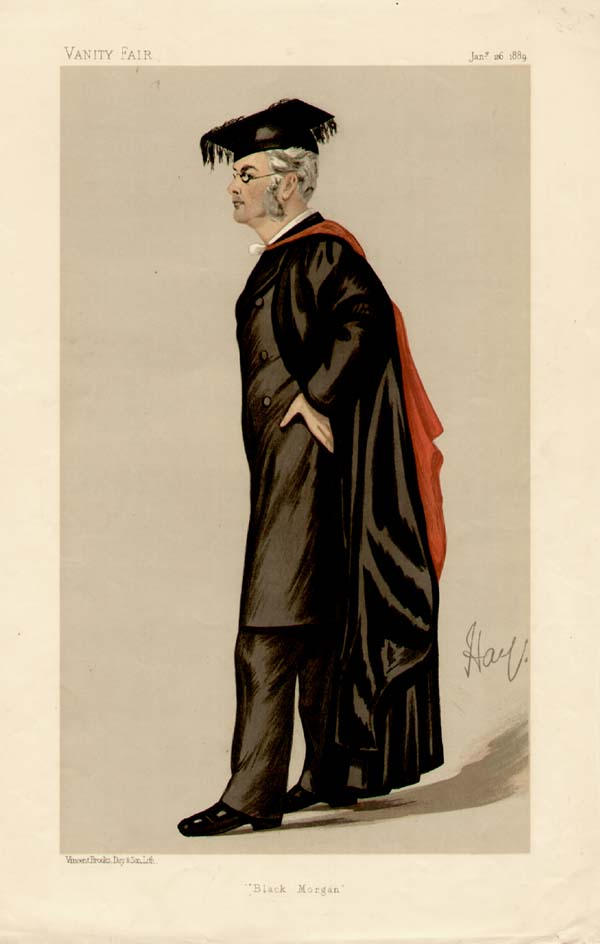
Henry Arthur Morgan was Master of the college from 1885 to 1912.

The following is a list of masters of Jesus College, Cambridge:

| Name | Portrait | Term of office | |
|---|---|---|---|
| William Chubbes | | 1497 | 1505 |
| John Eccleston | | 1505 | 1516 |
| Thomas Alcock | | 1516 | |
| William Capon | | 1516 | 1546 |
| John Reston | | 1546 | 1551 |
| Edmund Pierpoint | | 1551 | 1557 |
| John Fuller | | 1557 | 1558 |
| Thomas Redman | | 1559 | 1560 |
| Edward Gascoyne | | 1560 | 1562 |
| John Lakin | | 1562 | 1563 |
| Thomas Ithell | | 1563 | 1579 |
| John Bell | | 1579 | 1589 |
| John Duport | | 1590 | 1617 |
| Roger Andrewes | | 1618 | 1632 |
| William Beale | | 1632 | 1634 |
| Richard Sterne | | 1634 | 1644 |
| Thomas Young | | 1644 | 1650 |
| John Worthington | | 1650 | 1660 |
| Richard Sterne | | 1660 | |
| John Pearson | | 1660 | 1662 |
| Joseph Beaumont | | 1662 | 1663 |
| Edmund Boldero | | 1663 | 1679 |
| Humphrey Gower | | 1679 | |
| William Saywell | | 1679 | 1701 |
| Charles Ashton | | 1701 | 1752 |
| Philip Yonge | | 1752 | 1758 |
| Lynford Caryl | | 1758 | 1781 |
| Richard Beadon | | 1781 | 1789 |
| William Pearce | | 1789 | 1820 |
| William French | | 1820 | 1849 |
| George Elwes Corrie | | 1849 | 1885 |
| Henry Arthur Morgan | | 1885 | 1912 |
| Arthur Gray | | 1912 | 1940 |
| Wynfrid Duckworth | | 1940 | 1945 |
| Eustace Mandeville Wetenhall Tillyard | | 1945 | 1959 |
| Denys Page | | 1959 | 1973 |
| Alan Cottrell | | 1973 | 1986 |
| Colin Renfrew | | 1986 | 1996 |
| David Crighton | | 1997 | 2000 |
| Robert Mair | | 2001 | 2011 |
| Ian H. White | | 2011 | 2019 |
| Sonita Alleyne | | 2019 | Incumbent |
