= William Craven (priest) =

English priest and academic (1730–1815)

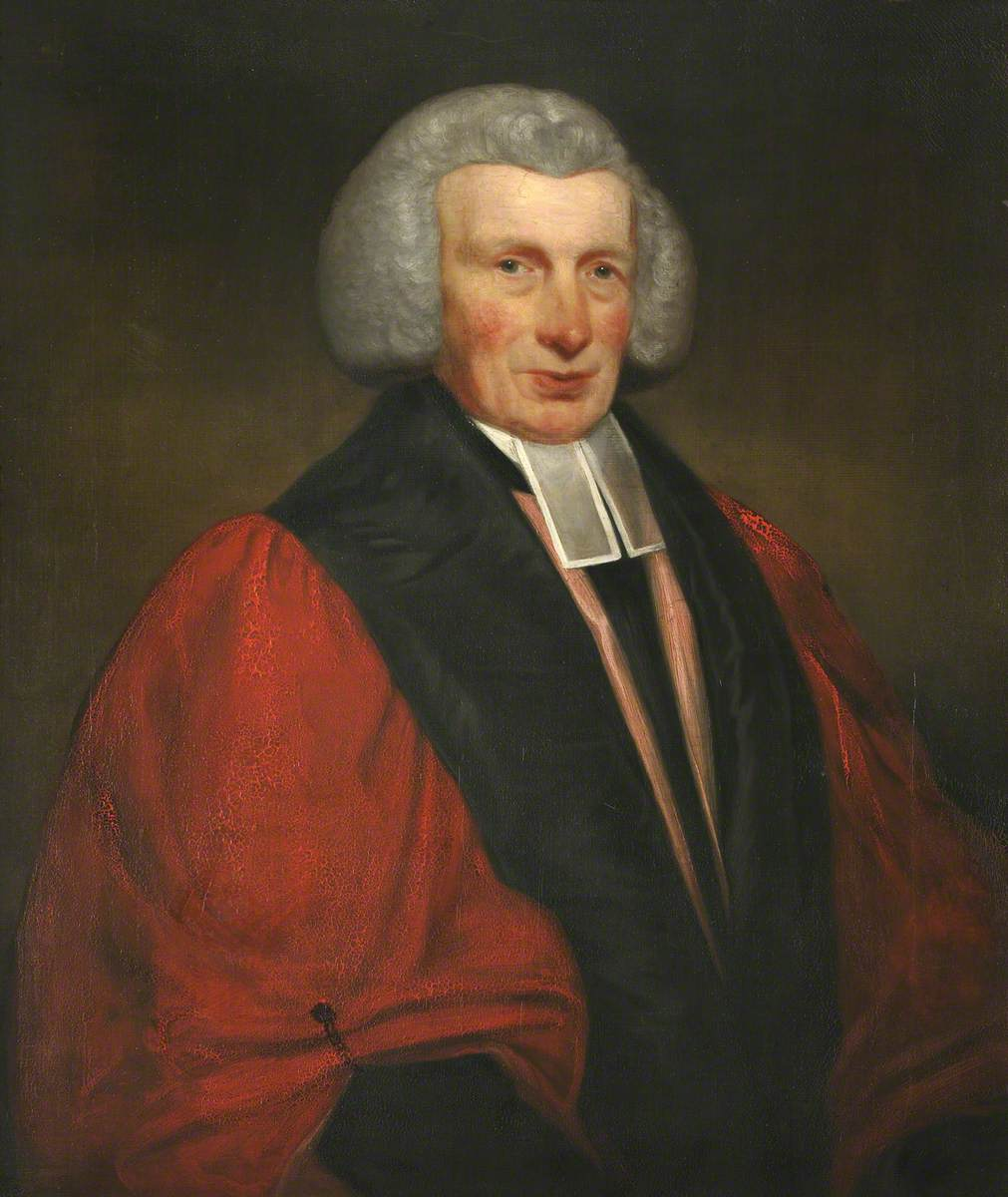
William Craven

William Craven, D.D. (3 July 1730 – 28 January 1815) was a priest and academic in the second half of the 18th and the first decades of the 19th centuries.

Craven was born at Gouthwaite Hall and educated at Sedbergh School. He graduated B.A. from St John's College, Cambridge in 1753, and M.A. in 1756. He was ordained in 1759; and was a Fellow of St John's from 1759 to 1789; and its Master from then until his death. He was also Vice-Chancellor of the University of Cambridge from 1790 until 1791.

Academic offices
Preceded by John Chevallier	Master of Magdalene College, Cambridge; 1789–1815	Succeeded by James Wood
Preceded by William Pearce	Vice-Chancellor of the University of Cambridge; 1790–1791	Succeeded by Thomas Postlethwaite
