= John Green (bishop) =

English clergyman (1706–1779)

John Green (1706 – 25 April 1779) was an English clergyman and academic. He became the chaplain of Charles Seymour, 6th Duke of Somerset, and Vice-Chancellor of the University of Cambridge.

== Life ==
Green was born at Beverley in Yorkshire in 1706. Having been schooled in his home town, he was admitted to St John's College, Cambridge in 1724. Green graduated B.A. in 1728 and was awarded a fellowship in 1730. He was ordained in 1731 and became vicar of Hinxton, Cambridgeshire. He was eventually made domestic chaplain to the Duke of Somerset, who was chancellor of the University of Cambridge. In 1748, the Duke died and was succeeded by the Duke of Newcastle who quickly saw to it that Green was appointed Regius Professor of Divinity, the most senior chair in the university.

In 1750, Green was appointed as master of Corpus Christi College, Cambridge despite the fact he had no links with the college. In 1756 he became Dean of Lincoln, at which point he resigned the professorship. He was vice-chancellor of the University of Cambridge between 1756 and 1757.

Through Newcastle, Green was appointed Bishop of Lincoln in 1761 and he resigned his other ecclesiastical appointments and then in 1764 the Mastership of Corpus.

Green campaigned against the Methodists, writing two pamphlets called "The Principles and Practices of Methodists Considered", but was dissuaded from writing a third by the Archbishop of Canterbury, Thomas Secker.

He began to lose the approval of the court when he voted in favour of a bill in the House of Lords for the relief of Protestant dissenters. The King, George III is reported to have said “Green, Green, he shall never be translated”.

He was never promoted again and died unmarried in Bath on 25 April 1779.

Academic offices
Preceded by John Whalley	Regius Professor of Divinity at Cambridge; 1749—1756	Succeeded by Thomas Rutherforth
Preceded by Edmund Castle	Master of Corpus Christi College, Cambridge; 1750-1764	Succeeded by John Barnardiston
Preceded by John Sumner	Vice-Chancellor of the University of Cambridge; 1757-1758	Succeeded by Lynford Caryl
Church of England titles
Preceded by John Thomas	Bishop of Lincoln; 1761–1779	Succeeded by Thomas Thurlow
