= William Elliston =

William Elliston may refer to:

- William Elliston (academic), priest and vice-chancellor of the University of Cambridge
- William R. Elliston, American planter, slaveholder and politician
- William Rowley Elliston, British judge and politician
