= Francis Mallet =

English churchman and academic

Francis Mallet (or Mallett) (died 16 December 1570) was an English churchman and academic, and chaplain to Mary Tudor.

The son of William Mallet of Normanton, West Yorkshire, Francis Mallet graduated from the University of Cambridge, B.A. in 1522, M.A. (1525) and D.D. (1535), and became the last Master of Michaelhouse, Cambridge, in 1533, before it was merged with King's Hall to form Trinity College. He had in this the support of Thomas Cromwell; Mallet became chaplain to Thomas Cranmer in the mid-1530s, and was chaplain to Cromwell in 1538. Mallet was Vice-Chancellor of the University of Cambridge, in 1536 and in 1540. The college was dissolved by Henry VIII in 1546.

He was appointed to the seventh stall in St George's Chapel, Windsor Castle in 1543 and held this until 1570.

He became chaplain to the Princess Mary in 1544 leaving the employment of the current Queen Consort Katherine Parr. Under Edward VI, he ran into trouble, for celebrating mass for Mary, in May 1551. He was confined to the Tower of London for a period. He was later made Dean of Lincoln (1554), by Mary as Queen. Around the time of her death, he was nominated (14 October 1558) as Bishop of Salisbury, but was unable to take up the post, remaining Dean.

Francis Mallet died at Normanton on 16 December 1570. Henry Mallet, brother of Francis, attended Cambridge as well, was a fellow of Clare College, Cambridge, entered the ministry, and later served as prebendary of Lincoln, vicar of St Giles-without-Cripplegate, London, and rector of St Martin Orgar, London.

== Notes ==
Academic offices
Preceded by ?	Master of Michaelhouse, Cambridge; 1533–1546	Succeeded by None
Preceded by John Crayford	Vice-Chancellor of Cambridge University; 1536–1537	Succeeded by George Day
Preceded by John Edmunds	Vice-Chancellor of Cambridge University; 1540–1541	Succeeded by Richard Standish
Church of England titles
Preceded by William Petow	Bishop of Salisbury; 1558	Succeeded by John Jewel
