= William Powell (Archdeacon of Colchester) =

English Anglican priest

- Archdeacon of Colchester
- Church: Church of England

William Samuel Powell, D.D. (1717–1775) was an eighteenth century academic and priest, most notably Vice Chancellor of the University of Cambridge from 1765 until 1766; and Archdeacon of Colchester from 1766 until his death. He was elected as a Fellow of the Royal Society in 1764.

== Life ==
He was born on 27 September 1717 in Colchester, the elder son of the Rev. Francis Powell and his wife Susan Reynolds, daughter of Samuel Reynolds (died 1694), Member of Parliament for Colchester. He was educated at Colchester Royal Grammar School, under Palmer Smythies. He was admitted in 1734, and matriculated 1738, at St John's College, Cambridge, where he graduated B.A. in 1739, M.A. in 1742, B.D. in 1749, and D.D in 1749.

== Academic career ==
Powell was successively Fellow, tutor, taxor and Master of St John's.

In 1741 Powell became private tutor to Charles Townshend, second son of Charles Townshend, 3rd Viscount Townshend. At the end of that year he was ordained deacon and priest, and was presented on 13 January 1742 by Lord Townshend to the rectory of Colkirk in Norfolk, with Stibbard. In 1742 he returned to college life, and, after reading lectures for two years as assistant tutor, was promoted in 1744 to be principal tutor, and acted in 1745 as senior taxor of the university. In Cambridge his main friends were Thomas Balguy and Richard Hurd. William Mason, who was then an undergraduate at St John's tutored by Powell, referred in a contemporary poem to "gentle Powell's placid mien."

On 3 November 1760 Powell became a senior Fellow of his college, and in 1761, when he had inherited the property of his cousin, he left Cambridge and took a house in London. He resigned his fellowship in 1763.

On 25 January 1765 Powell was unanimously elected Master of St John's College, Cambridge, where he spent the rest of his life; there were numerous competitors for the post, but he was backed by the influence of Thomas Pelham-Holles, 1st Duke of Newcastle. The following November, he succeeded to the vice-chancellorship of the university, and in December 1766 he was appointed by the crown to the archdeaconry of Colchester.

In 1768 Powell claimed the college rectory of Freshwater, Isle of Wight, worth £500 per annum, which was in the option of the master, and resigned the benefices of Colkirk and Stibbard; the Fellows disliked this act. He gave money to the college when it was intended to rebuild the first court and to lay out the gardens under the care of Capability Brown. He guarded the college revenues. In his first year he established college examinations, drawing up the papers himself, and attending the examinations; but he opposed John Jebb's proposal for annual examinations of the whole university. He helped several undergraduates financially and gave prizes at his own expense; he did not allow any student to pass without examination in one of the Gospels or the Acts of the Apostles. He himself attended chapel without a break through the whole year, at six o'clock in the morning. His manners, however, were "rigid and unbending."

About 1770 Powell suffered a stroke of apoplexy, and he died in his chair, from a fit of the palsy, on 19 January 1775. He was buried in the college chapel on 25 January. Over his vault was placed a flat blue stone, with an epitaph by Balguy. He was unmarried.

== Works ==
While at Cambridge, Powell twice provoked serious controversy.

1. There was printed in 1757, and reprinted in 1758, 1759, and 1772, a sermon, entitled A Defence of the Subscriptions required in the Church of England, which he had preached before the university on Commencement Sunday. He contended that the 39 Articles were general and indeterminate, and "left room for improvements in theology". These views were widely criticised, with Powell's major public opponent being Francis Blackburne, who published his severe Remarks on the sermon in 1758.
2. The Lucasian professorship was vacant in 1760, and among the candidates were Edward Waring of Magdalene College and William Ludlam of St John's College. Waring distributed a portion of his Miscellanea Analytica, and to support Ludlam of his own college, Powell attacked it anonymously in Observations on the First Chapter of a Book called "Miscellanea Analytica", 1760. To a reply by Waring, Powell retorted in an anonymous Defence of the Observations, which Waring answered in a Letter.

Powell also wrote:

- The Heads of a Course of Lectures on Experimental Philosophy (anon.), 1746 and 1753.
- (Attributed) An anonymous pamphlet, An Observation on the Design of establishing Annual Examinations at Cambridge, 1774, answered by Ann Jebb in A Letter to the Author.
- Discourses on Various Subjects, 1776; edited by Thomas Balguy, who supplied an outline of his life. They were said by Richard Watson to have been "written with great acuteness and knowledge." Thomas Smart Hughes reprinted them in 1832, with the discourses of James Fawcett and an account of Powell's career.

== Family ==
Powell's fortune came to him through the death of a childless cousin.

Powell's mother's eldest brother was Samuel Reynolds the younger, who married Frances, daughter of Charles Pelham of Brocklesby, Lincolnshire, and sister of Charles Pelham MP, of the family of the Duke of Newcastle. Their son, Charles Reynolds of Peldon Hall, admitted to the Inner Temple in 1719, inherited the family estates in Essex. He married Charlotte, second daughter of Francis Anderson of Manby (1675–1747); Anderson having married Mary, eldest daughter of Charles Pelham of Brocklesby, this was a first-cousin marriage. (While the wording in both the Dictionary of National Biography and the Oxford Dictionary of National Biography implies the Brocklesby estate passed to Powell, it went to Charles Anderson-Pelham, 1st Baron Yarborough, a grandson of Francis Anderson. The History of Parliament confirms he succeeded Charles Pelham MP.)

Those Essex estates, with other property in Little Bentley and Wix, in the same county, came to Powell when Charles Reynolds died in 1760, his two children having predeceased him. He left his property to Miss Jolland, granddaughter of Susan Reynolds his mother through a marriage to George Jolland that preceded her marriage to the Rev. Francis Powell.

== Notes ==
Attribution

This article incorporates text from a publication now in the public domain: Lee, Sidney, ed. (1896). "Powell, William Samuel". Dictionary of National Biography. Vol. 46. London: Smith, Elder & Co.

Academic offices
Preceded by John Newcome	Master of St John's College, Cambridge; 1765–1775	Succeeded by John Chevallier
Preceded by John Barnardiston	Vice-Chancellor of Cambridge University; 1765–1766	Succeeded by John Smith
Church of England titles
Preceded by Charles Moss	Archdeacon of Colchester; 1766–11775	Succeeded by Anthony Hamilton
