= Thomas Browne (Master of Pembroke College, Cambridge) =

Thomas Browne, D.D. (b Norwich 1648 – d London 1706) was Master of Pembroke College, Cambridge from 1694 until his death.

Browne entered Pembroke College, Cambridge in 1664. He graduated B.A. in 1668 and M.A. in 1671. He became a Fellow of Pembroke in 1671; was ordained in 1674; and appointed Junior Proctor in 1685. He held the living at Orton Waterville from 1687 until his death. He was also Vice-Chancellor of the University of Cambridge from 1694 to 1695.

Academic offices
Preceded by Nathaniel Coga	Master of Pembroke College, Cambridge; 1694-1706	Succeeded by Edward Lany
Preceded by William Stanley	Vice-Chancellor of the University of Cambridge; 1694-1695	Succeeded by John Eachard
