= Gabriel Quadring =

Gabriel Quadring, D.D. (1640-1713) was a priest and academic.

Evans was educated at Magdalene College, Cambridge. He was ordained in 1668; and held the living at Dry Drayton. He was Fellow and Taxor at Magdalene before becoming its Master in 1690. He was Vice-Chancellor of the University of Cambridge from 1691 until 1692; and again from 1711 until 1712.
