= Philip Yonge =

18th-century Anglican bishop

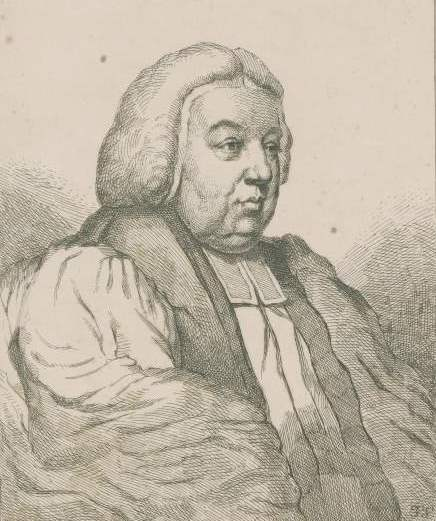
Bishop Yonge by Frederick Sandys

Philip Yonge DD (1709 – 23 April 1783) was a British clergyman. He was appointed Bishop of Bristol in 1758 and translated to become Bishop of Norwich in 1761; he died in that office in 1783.

Yonge was the son of Francis and Elizabeth Yonge. Francis Yonge was Commissary of the Ordnance during the War of the Spanish Succession, and later the London agent for South Carolina. Yonge was born in Lisbon in 1709. He was educated at Westminster School and Trinity College, Cambridge, and ordained in 1735. He was master of Jesus College, Cambridge (1752–58) and also a canon of Westminster Abbey (1750–1754) and a prebendary of St. Paul's Cathedral (1754–1761).

The diarist Sylas Neville, who was a dissenter, attended a service at Norwich Cathedral on Friday 21 August 1772, and recorded in his diary:

Heard an inanimate sermon at the Cathedral by Dr. Philip Yonge, Bishop of this Diocese for the benefit of the Norfolk Hospital. This fat blown-up fellow is said to be one of the best preachers in the Establishment. But it is low in preachers, if that is the case. He seems quite dropsical. He took his text from that passage of Proverbs – 'The rich & poor meet together'. While Prayers were reading, he often lifted up his hand, as if joining in the petitions, in the most formal manner. This put me in mind of what Junius calls 'the supercilious hypocrisy of a Bishop'.

In 1761 Yonge married Anne, daughter of Calverley Bewicke of Clapham. He died in his house in Upper Grosvenor Street, Mayfair on 23 April 1783 and was buried in the Grosvenor Chapel in Mayfair.

Yonge's contemporaries in Norwich regarded him as extraordinarily idle.

Academic offices
| Preceded by Charles Ashton | Master of Jesus College, Cambridge; 1753–1758 | Succeeded by Lynford Caryl |
Church of England titles
| Preceded by John Hume | Bishop of Bristol; 1758–1761 | Succeeded by Thomas Newton |
| Preceded by Thomas Hayter | Bishop of Norwich; 1761–1783 | Succeeded by Lewis Bagot |
