= Henry Philpott (bishop) =

Anglican bishop (1807–1892)

The Right Reverend Henry Philpott
- Bishop of Worcester
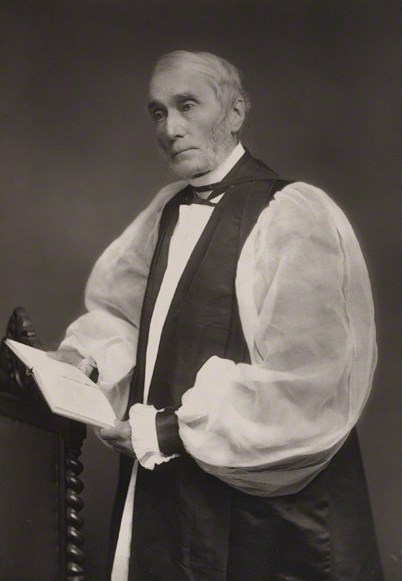
- Church: Church of England
- Diocese: Worcester
- In office: 1861–1890
- Predecessor: Henry Pepys
- Successor: John Perowne
- Other posts: Vice Chancellor of the University of Cambridge (1846; 1856–1857)

Personal details
- Born: 17 November 1807
- Died: 10 January 1892 (aged 84)
- Denomination: Anglican
- Education: St Catharine's College, Cambridge

Henry Philpott (17 November 1807 – 10 January 1892) was an Anglican bishop and academic.

He matriculated at St Catharine's College, Cambridge, in 1825 and graduated as Senior Wrangler and 2nd Smith's prizeman in 1829. He was elected a Fellow of St Catharine's College on 6 April 1829 and was subsequently elected Master of St Catharine's College in 1845, a post he held until 1861. During the same period, he was Vice-Chancellor of the University of Cambridge on three occasions (1846, 1856, 1857).

Philpott was awarded the degree of Doctor of Divinity by royal letters patent in 1847 and was Bishop of Worcester from 1861 to 1890. His election to the see was confirmed on 13 March and he was consecrated a bishop on 25 March 1861. He was Clerk of the Closet from 1865 to 1891 and Chairman of the Cambridge University Commission in 1878.

Academic offices
Preceded by Joseph Procter	Master of St Catharine's College, Cambridge; 1845–1861	Succeeded by Charles Robinson
Preceded by Ralph Tatham	Vice-Chancellor of the University of Cambridge; 1846	Succeeded by Robert Phelps
Preceded by William Whewell	Vice-Chancellor of the University of Cambridge; 1856–1857	Succeeded by William Henry Bateson
Church of England titles
Preceded by Henry Pepys	Bishop of Worcester; 1860–1890	Succeeded by John Perowne
