= William Buckmaster =

English cleric and academic

William Buckmaster (died 1545) was an English cleric and academic, three times vice-chancellor of the University of Cambridge.

== Life ==
Buckmaster graduated at Peterhouse, Cambridge, B.A. in 1513–14, M.A. in 1517, B.D. in 1525, and D.D. in 1528. In 1517 he was elected fellow of his college. He served as vice-chancellor (terms starting in 1529, 1538, and 1539).

As vice-chancellor in 1529–30, Buckmaster took a prominent part in preparing replies to the questions referred by Henry VIII to the university about his divorce (the King's "great matter"). After discussion, Convocation resolved that marriage with a brother's wife was contrary to divine law, but the university declined to express an opinion on whether the Pope had power to permit such a marriage. This answer was not what the king desired, but Buckmaster was selected to carry it to Windsor and announce to Henry VIII the university's judgement.

Buckmaster was twice elected Lady Margaret's Professor of Divinity (1532 and 1534). He became rector of Barcheston, Warwickshire (23 April 1530), and fellow of King's Hall (1532). He signed the Ten Articles of religion of 1536 as proctor in convocation of the London clergy; and about 1537 he was consulted by Thomas Cromwell, with many others, on the form which certain theological dogmas should take in the Anglican articles. He became prebendary of Hereford Cathedral (1539), and of St Paul's Cathedral, London (1541). He died shortly before 14 September 1545. Roger Ascham refers to Buckmaster as one of his Cambridge patrons.

== Works ==
Buckmaster wrote an account of his reception at court in a letter to John Edmunds, Master of Peterhouse, preserved in manuscript at Corpus Christi College, Cambridge. He asserts that his performance of the duty lost him an important benefice that was about to be conferred on him.

== See also ==
- Catholic Church in England

== Notes ==
Attribution

This article incorporates text from a publication now in the public domain: Stephen, Leslie, ed. (1886). "Buckmaster, William". Dictionary of National Biography. Vol. 7. London: Smith, Elder & Co.
