= Joseph Beaumont =

English academic and poet (1616–1699)

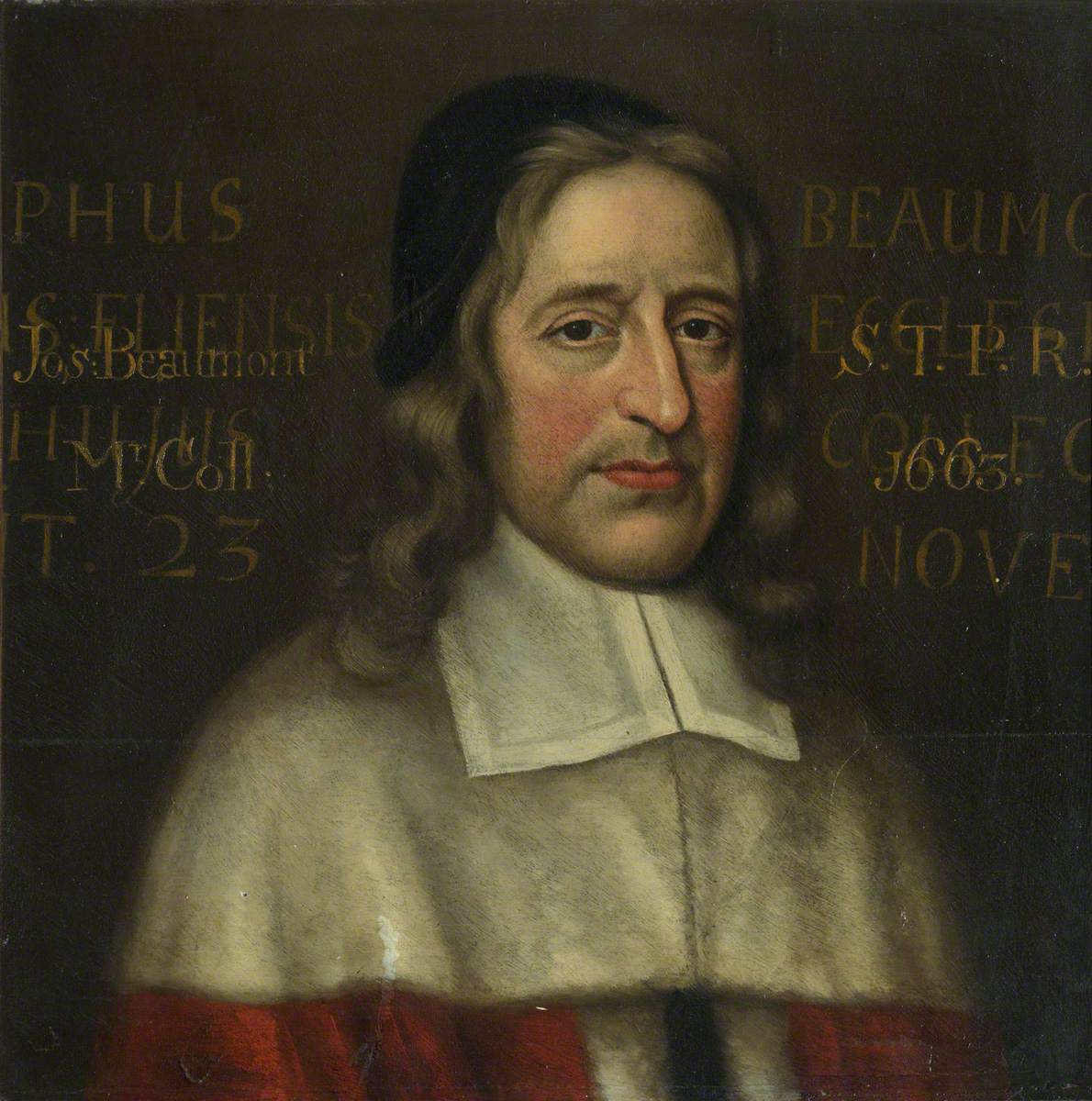
Joseph Beaumont

Joseph Beaumont (13 March 1616 – 23 November 1699) was an English clergyman, academic and poet.

== Life ==
Beaumont was the son of John Beaumont and Sarah Clarke. He was born in Hadleigh, Suffolk, on 13 March 1616. Educated at Hadleigh grammar school, he proceeded to Cambridge in 1631, where he was admitted as a pensioner to Peterhouse, Cambridge. He took his degree of B.A. in 1634, and became a fellow of his college in 1636, the master then being John Cosin. Richard Crashaw, the poet, had now passed from Pembroke College to Peterhouse, and in 1638 he and Beaumont received their degree of M.A. together.

In 1644, Beaumont was one of the royalist fellows ejected from Cambridge, and he retired to Hadleigh, where he sat down to write his epic poem of Psyche. Beaumont fared particularly well during the Commonwealth. From 1643 he held the rectory of Kelshall in Hertfordshire, as non-resident, and in 1646 he added to this, or exchanged it for, the living of Elm-cum-Emneth in Cambridgeshire. He was appointed in the same year to a canonry of Ely.

In 1650, Beaumont became domestic chaplain to Matthew Wren, bishop of Ely, and held various other sinecures. He married Elizabeth Browning, the daughter of Robert Browning, on 7 May 1650. Beaumont and his wife resided for the next ten years at Tatingston Place, in Suffolk, where he did religious research, wrote commentaries on the Bible, and wrote poetry.

At the Restoration of 1660, Beaumont was made Doctor of Divinity and one of the king's chaplains. Early in 1661, he went to Ely to reside, at the bishop's request, but his wife caught the fen fever, and died on 31 May 1662. She was buried in Ely Cathedral. During his wife's fatal illness, Beaumont was appointed master of Jesus College, Cambridge, in succession to John Pearson; and he moved to Cambridge with his six young children, only one of whom lived to manhood. He restored Jesus Chapel at his own expense; on 24 April 1663, he was admitted master of Peterhouse.

Beaumont's long controversy with Henry More, the Cambridge Platonist, dates from 1665. In 1674, he was appointed Regius Professor of Divinity and delivered a course of lectures on Romans and Colossians, which he forbade his executors to publish. A collective evaluation of the soteriological lectures that he gave and the theological lectures that he moderated reveal his promotion of English-Arminianism at Cambridge, which was already established by his predecessor Peter Gunning.

In 1689, Beaumont was appointed to meet the leaders of nonconformity as one of the commissioners of comprehension. He preached before the university on 5 November 1699, died on 23 November, and was buried in the college chapel of Peterhouse.

== Works ==
Psyche was published early in 1648. The allegorical poem represents the soul led by divine grace and her guardian angel through the various temptations and assaults of life into her eternal felicity; it is written in a six-line heroic stanza, and contains, in its abridged form, 30,000 lines. In 1702, Charles Beaumont, the only surviving son, brought out a new edition, entirely revised and enlarged by the addition of four fresh cantos.

A life of Beaumont was written by John Gee of Peterhouse, who affixed it to the collection of Beaumont's poems, which he first edited at Cambridge in 1749; further information was published by Hugh Pigot in his History of Hadleigh in 1860. The complete poems of Beaumont, in English and Latin, were first edited, in two quarto volumes., privately printed, by A. B. Grosart in 1880, with a memoir in which some additions are made to the information preserved by Gee.

Beaumont prefixed a copy of Latin verses to the Muse Juridicae of William Hawkins in 1634, and published in 1665, at Cambridge, Some Observations upon the Apologie of Dr. Henry More. An artist of some pretension, he adorned the altar of Peterhouse Chapel with scripture scenes which have now disappeared.

Academic offices
| Preceded by John Pearson | Master of Jesus College, Cambridge; 1662–1663 | Succeeded by Edmund Boldero |
| Preceded by Bernard Hale | Master of Peterhouse, Cambridge; 1663–1699 | Succeeded by Thomas Richardson |
| Preceded by Peter Gunning | Regius Professor of Divinity at Cambridge; 1674—1699 | Succeeded by Henry James |
