= Nathaniel Coga =

English academic

Nathaniel Coga, D.D. (b Veryan 1637 – d Cambridge 1693) was a 17th-century English academic:Master of Pembroke College, Cambridge from 1677 until his death.

Coga entered Pembroke College, Cambridge in 1653. He graduated B.A. in 1657 and M.A. in 1660. He became a Fellow of Pembroke in 1671; and was appointed Junior Proctor later that year. Coga held livings at Barton, Swaffham, Feltwell and Framlingham He was also Chaplain to Matthew Wren. He became Vice-Chancellor of the University of Cambridge in 1680, holding the office (as was customary at that time) for a year.

Academic offices
Preceded by Robert Mapletoft	Master of Pembroke College, Cambridge; 1677-1693	Succeeded by Thomas Browne
Preceded by Humphrey Gower	Vice-Chancellor of the University of Cambridge; 1681-1682	Succeeded by John Coplestone
