= Charles Edward Searle =

English clergyman and academic

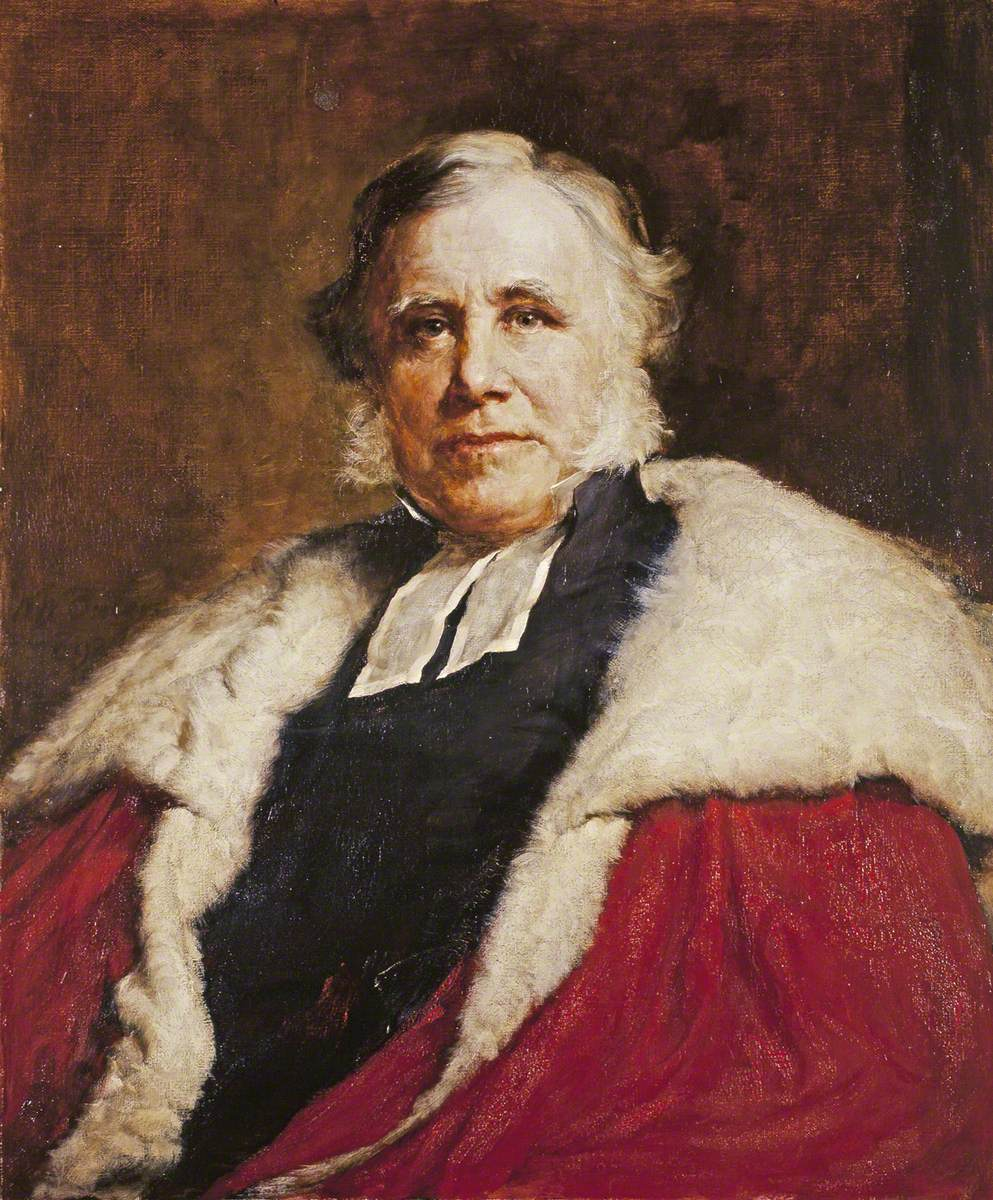
Charles Edward Searle by Walter William Ouless

Charles Edward Searle (18 June 1828 in Hackney – 29 July 1902 in Cambridge) was an English clergyman and academic, Master of Pembroke College, Cambridge from 1880 until his death in 1902.

== Biography ==
Charles Edward Searle was the seventh son of Samuel Browne Searle and Charlotte née Smales, of Hackney. His father died when he was young, leaving his mother with 12 children, and thus two of the brothers were educated at Christ's Hospital, supported by the governor of the hospital. Searle specialized in mathematics, and was elected to a scholarship at Pembroke College, Cambridge in 1848, graduating BA (10th wrangler) in 1851. Elected a fellow, he was ordained deacon in 1854, and priest in 1855. He was curate in Broughton in 1855, of Odell, Bedfordshire, 1856–64, and of Earl Stonham 1864–70. In that year he returned to Pembroke as a tutor, served as lecturer and Dean, and eventually (from his election in 1880) Master of Pembroke. "To him, more than to any other single man, the growth of the College, both in numbers and distinction, during the later part of the nineteenth century, was due." He was Vice-Chancellor of Cambridge University in 1888–89. He was the friend and chief mentor of Inagaki Manjiro.

In 1881 he married Miss Fowler, niece of John Power, his predecessor as Master.

Searle died on 29 July 1902.

Academic offices
Preceded by John Power	Master of Pembroke College, Cambridge; 1880–1902	Succeeded by Sir George Stokes
Preceded by Charles Taylor	Vice-Chancellor of the University of Cambridge; 1888–1889	Succeeded by Henry Montagu Butler
