= Henry James (Regius Professor) =

English clergyman and academic

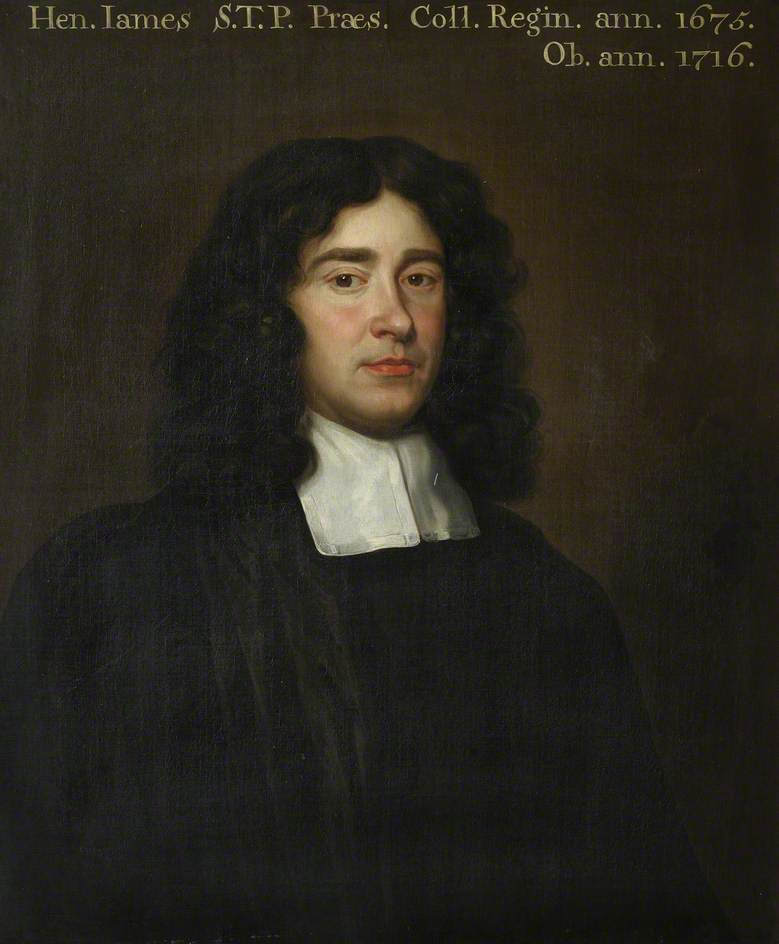
Henry James

Henry James (died 12 March 1717) was an English clergyman and academic at the University of Cambridge, who served as President of Queens' College, Cambridge 1675–1717 and Regius Professor of Divinity 1699–1717.

Henry James was the son of Henry James, a Somerset vicar and chaplain to the Bishop of Bristol. He was schooled at Eton College, and was admitted to Magdalene College, Cambridge in 1660, but transferred to Queens' College, Cambridge in August 1661, graduating B.A. 1664, M.A. 1667, B.D. 1675, D.D. 1679 (per lit. reg.).

He was appointed a Fellow of Queens' College in 1664, Taxor in 1673–4, and was elected President of Queens' College on 29 July 1675 (by royal mandate). He served as Vice-Chancellor of the University of Cambridge 1683–4 and 1696–9, was appointed Regius Professor of Divinity in 1699. As Regius Professor, he presided over the doctoral disputation in 1710 of Samuel Clarke as examiner. He paid light-hearted tribute to a virtuosic performance by Clarke, turning the traditional Latin saying for termination against himself as name me probe exercuisti (you have exercised me enough); and suggested he might as well retire from the chair. But Clarke had not in fact convinced him that his Trinitarian views were orthodox.

In the church, James was ordained deacon in 1667 and priest in 1668, and appointed Rector of St Botolph's Church, Cambridge in 1671. He was also Rector of Somersham, Chaplain to King Charles II, and was appointed to prebends at York Minster in 1687 and Canterbury Cathedral in 1705.
