= William Towers (priest) =

English priest and academic (1681–1745)

William Towers , D.D. (20 January 1681– 1 March 1745) was a priest and academic in the eighteenth century.

Towers was born in Gaywood, Norfolk. He was educated at Christ's College, Cambridge, graduating B.A. in 1701 and MA in 1704. He became Fellow of Christ's in 1702; and was Master from 1723 until his death. He was Vice-Chancellor of the University of Cambridge from 1734 to 1735. He held livings at Caldecote and Snailwell. He was Chaplain to King George II from 1727 until 1732.
