= George Archdall-Gratwicke =

British academic (1787–1871)

George John Archdall-Gratwicke (baptised 14 May 1787, in Spondon – 16 September 1871, in Cambridge), called George John Archdall until 1863, was an academic in the 19th century.

Archdall was educated at Derby School and Emmanuel College, Cambridge, matriculating in 1811, gaining a scholarship, graduating B.A. 1815, M.A. 1818, B.D. 1825, D.D. 1835.

He became a Fellow of Emmanuel in 1817, was ordained in 1822, became Bursar of Emmanuel, then Master in 1835, remaining Master until his death. He was Vice-Chancellor of the University of Cambridge in 1835 and 1841. He was a Canon of Norwich Cathedral from 1842 until 1867.

In 1863 he acquired by Royal License the additional surname of Gratwicke.
