= Joseph Proctor (academic) =

English academic (d. 1845)

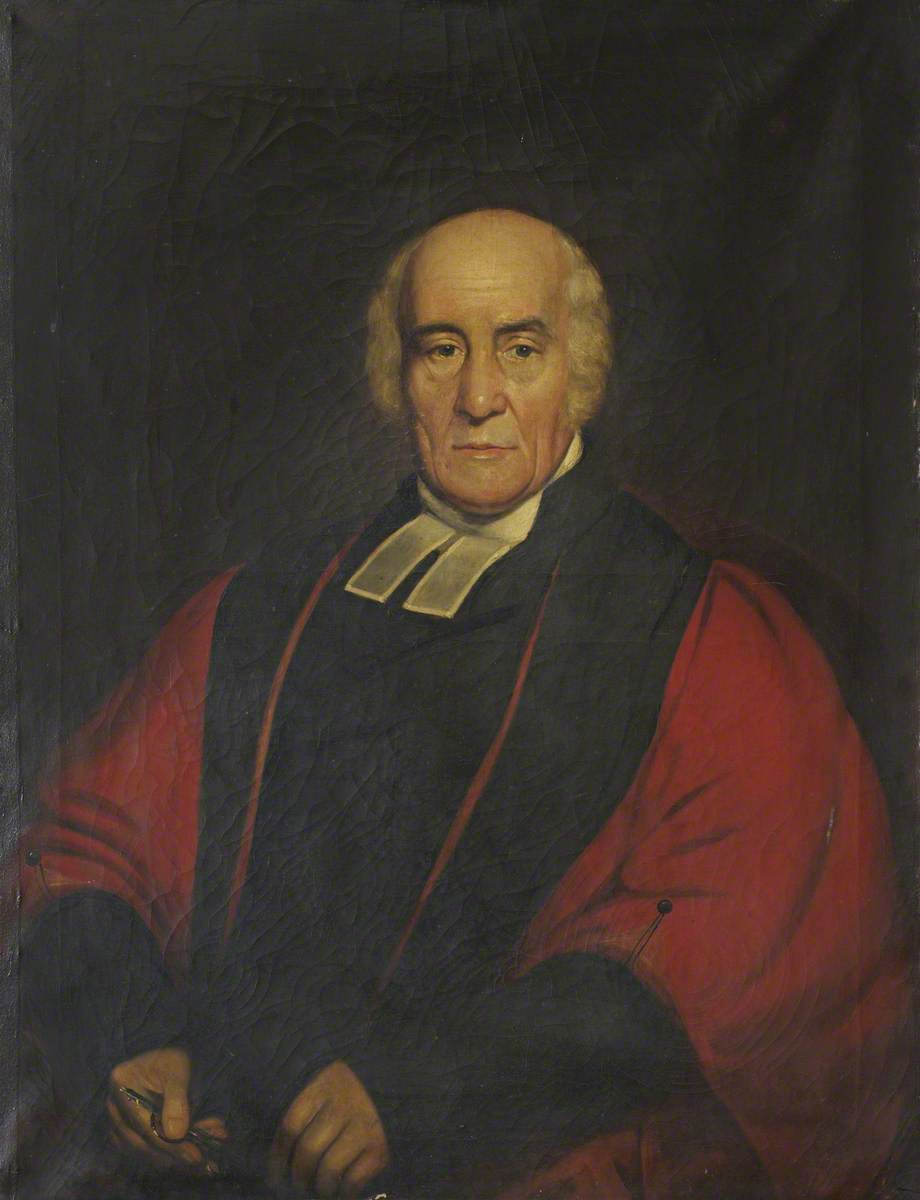
Joseph Proctor

Joseph Proctor (also Procter, died 1845) was an academic of the University of Cambridge in the 18th and 19th centuries.

Proctor was born in Stow, Lincolnshire, and educated at Leeds Grammar School. He was admitted St Catharine's Hall, Cambridge on 18 January 1779, graduating B.A. (3rd wrangler and 2nd Smith's Prize) 1783, M.A. 1786, B.D. 1799, and D.D. (per lit. reg.) 1801.

Proctor served as a fellow of St Catharine's 1783–1799, and as master 1799–1845. He was Rector of Steeple Gidding 1807–34, Walgrave 1810–17 and Conington 1824–34, and a prebendary of Norwich Cathedral. He served as Vice-Chancellor of the University of Cambridge in 1801, and was elected vice-chancellor again in 1826.

He died on 10 November 1845, at the age of 84.
