= Gilbert Ainslie =

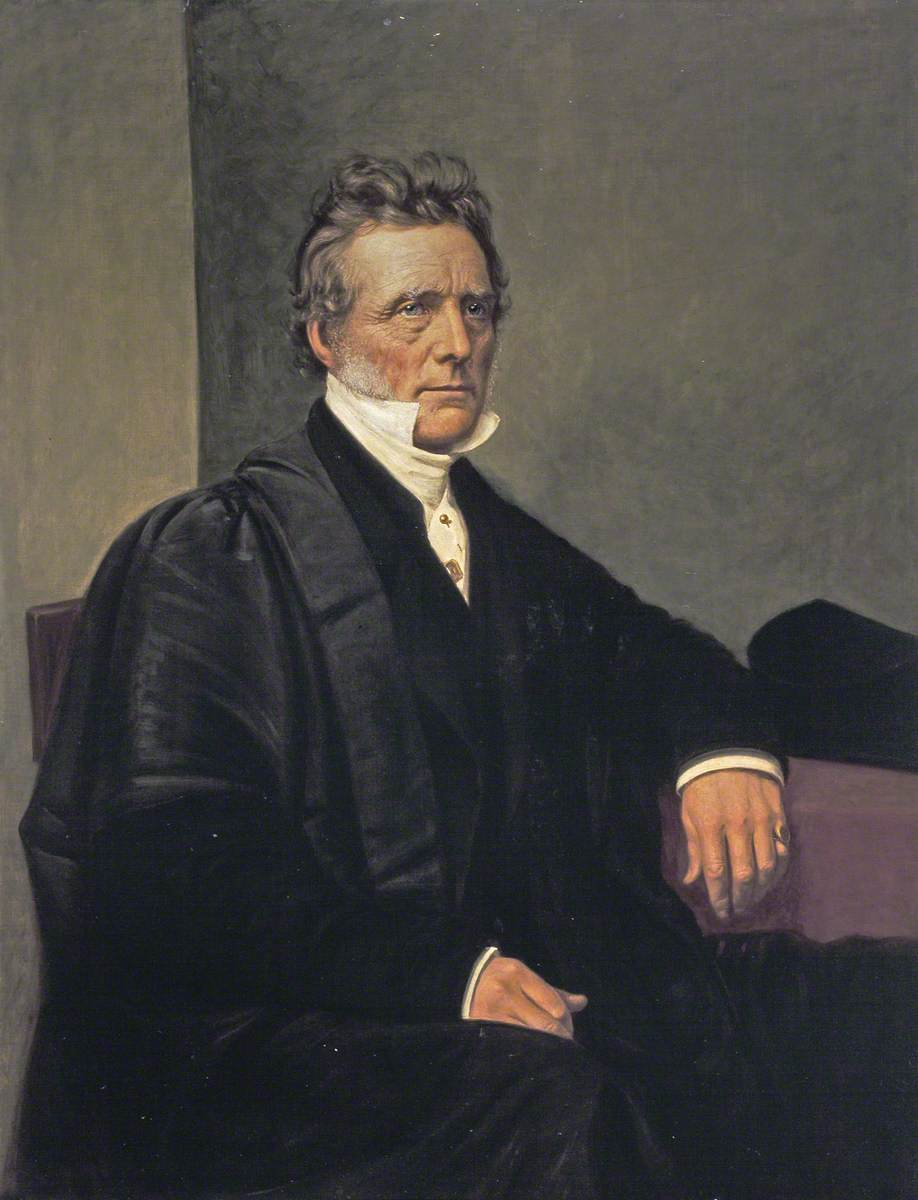
Gilbert Ainslie by Frederick Bacon Barwell

Gilbert Ainslie (2 June 1793 – 9 January 1870) was an English academic and clergyman.

== Life ==
The fourth son of Henry Ainslie MD FRCP (1760–1834), Ainslie was born at Kendal and educated at Charterhouse. His name was entered at Trinity College, Cambridge, on 3 July 1810, but on 10 January 1811 he migrated to Pembroke, from where he matriculated in the Michaelmas term of 1811, gaining a scholarship. He graduated BA in 1815, when he was Eighth Wrangler, and the same year was elected a Fellow of his college. The next year he was ordained a deacon of the Church of England, and in 1818 a priest. Also in 1818 he proceeded to the degree of MA and in 1828 was appointed Master of Pembroke College, later the same year becoming Vice-Chancellor of the University of Cambridge for the year. In 1829 the university made him a Doctor of Divinity. He was again vice-chancellor in 1836 and remained Master of Pembroke until his death in 1870.

In 1837 Ainslie laid the foundation stone of the Fitzwilliam Museum.

In 1829 he married Emily, a daughter of William Coxhead Marsh, of Park Hall, Theydon Garnon, Essex. Their third son Aymer Ainslie (1841–1901), a mining engineer, was named after Aymer Valence, husband of Mary Valence, Countess of Pembroke, who in the 14th century had founded Marie Valence's Hall, which grew into Pembroke College. Ainslie wrote a life of the foundress.

In succession, Ainslie and his predecessor Joseph Turner held the Mastership of Pembroke College for a total of eighty-six years, becoming the two longest-serving Masters.

Ainslie died at the Master's Lodge, Pembroke College, on 9 January 1870, leaving an estate valued at some £12,000. Probate was granted to his son Gilbert Ainslie, banker, of Cambridge.

== Works ==
- Life of Mary Valence (Pembroke College manuscript)

Academic offices
Preceded by Joseph Turner	Master of Pembroke College, Cambridge; 1828–1870	Succeeded by John Power
