= William Dillingham (academic) =

17th-century English academic

William Dillingham, D.D. (c. 1617–1689) was an English academic in the 17th century, known as a Neo-Latin poet.

Dillingham was born in Barnwell, Northamptonshire and educated at Oundle School. He entered Emmanuel College, Cambridge in 1636 and graduated B.A in 1640 and M.A. in 1643. He was Fellow from 1642 until 1653, and Master from1653 to 1662. He was Vice-Chancellor of the University of Cambridge from 1659 to 1660. He was Rector of Odell, Bedfordshire from 1662 until his death in 1689.
