= William Webb (Master of Clare College, Cambridge) =

English academic and priest (1775–1856)

William Webb, D.D. (b Sutton Coldfield 1775 - d Litlington, Cambridgeshire 1856) was Master of Clare College from 1815 until his death.

Webbwas educated at Clare College, Cambridge. He became Fellow in 1799. He was ordained a priest in the Church of England in 1801. He held incumbencies at Litlington, Cambridgeshire and Fornham All Saints. Webb was Vice-Chancellor of the University of Cambridge between 1817 and 1818; and between 1832 and 1833.

He died on 4 January 1856.
