= James Fleetwood =

English clergyman

James Fleetwood (bapt. 25 April 1603, Chalfont St Giles – died 17 July 1683, Hartlebury Castle) was an English clergyman and Bishop of Worcester.

== Life ==
He was descended from the old Lancashire family of Fleetwood and was the seventh son of Sir George Fleetwood of The Vache, Chalfont St Giles, Buckinghamshire.

He was educated at Eton and King's College, Cambridge. Upon his ordination he was appointed chaplain to Dr Wright Bishop of Lichfield. He became vicar of Prees, Shropshire and a Prebendary of Eccleshall.

Fleetwood was a committed Royalist and served as chaplain in the King's Army during the Civil War. In 1642, he was awarded a Doctorate of Divinity by King Charles in recognition of his services at the Battle of Edge Hill, and in the same year was appointed Rector of Sutton Coldfield and chaplain to Charles, Prince of Wales.

At the end of the Civil War he was ejected from the living of Sutton Coldfield but on the Restoration he was appointed as chaplain to Charles II and Provost of King's College, Cambridge. He was later Rector of Anstey, Hertfordshire and of Denham, Buckinghamshire and in 1675 was appointed Bishop of Worcester.

He died in 1683 and was buried in Worcester Cathedral.

Academic offices
Preceded by Benjamin Whichcote	Provost of King's College, Cambridge; 1660-1676	Succeeded by Thomas Page
Church of England titles
Preceded by Walter Blandford	Bishop of Worcester; 1675–1683	Succeeded by William Thomas
