= John Torkington =

English academic and priest (1742–1815)

John Torkington, D.D. (b & d Little Stukeley 26 March 1742 - 11 July 1815) was Master of Clare College from 1781 until his death.

Torkington was educated at Clare College, Cambridge. He became Fellow in 1768. He was ordained a priest in the Church of England in 1771. He held incumbencies at Little Stukeley, Patrington, Stapleford and Teigh. Torkington was Vice-Chancellor of the University of Cambridge between 1783 and 1784.
