= William Cooke (Provost of King's College) =

English cleric and academic

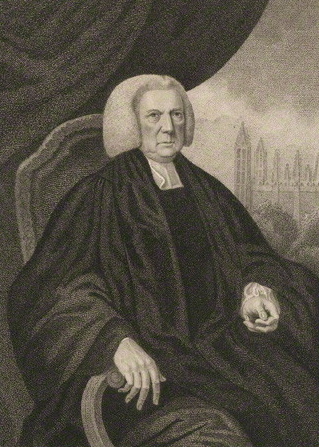
- William Cooke, 1798 engraving by Sylvester Harding
- Church: Church of England
- Diocese: Dean of Ely
- Installed: 1780
- Term ended: 1797
- Predecessor: Hugh Thomas
- Successor: William Pearce
- Other post: Provost of King's College, Cambridge

Personal details
- Born: 15 October 1711 St. James's, Westminster
- Died: 20 October 1797 (aged 86) Bath
- Spouse: Catherine Sleech
- Education: Harrow School; Eton College

William Cooke (1711–1797) was an English cleric and academic, Provost of King's College, Cambridge from 1772 and Dean of Ely from 1780.

== Life ==
He was born in St. James's, Westminster, 15 October 1711. He was sent to Harrow School in 1718, and then Eton College in 1721. In 1731 he became a scholar, and in 1734 a Fellow, of King's College, Cambridge. He graduated B.A. in 1735.

Soon after graduating Cooke became an assistant-master at Eton. In May 1743 he was unanimously elected head-master, but found his health too weak for the place, and in 1745 took the college living of Sturminster-Marshall, Dorset. In 1748 he was elected fellow of Eton College, and resigned Sturminster on being presented to the rectory of Denham, Buckinghamshire; he was also bursar of Eton. In 1765 he proceeded D.D., and was appointed chaplain to George Montagu-Dunk, 2nd Earl of Halifax. In 1768 he accepted the rectory of Stoke Newington.

On 25 March 1772, Cooke was unanimously elected Provost of King's College, Cambridge. He was vice-chancellor of the university in 1773. In April 1780, he received a prebend in Ely Cathedral, and on 9 August was appointed to the deanery.

Cooke died at Bath 20 October 1797.

== Works ==
Cooke published some sermons, and in 1732 a small (anonymous) collection of poems called Musæ Juveniles, including a Greek tragedy on King Solomon, called Sophia Theēlatos. In one of the sermons (1750), on the meaning of the expression in the second Epistle of St. Peter, "a more sure word of prophecy", he contributed to the Middletonian Controversy, defending Thomas Sherlock against Conyers Middleton.

Cooke composed an epitaph for himself in a south vestry of King's College Chapel, attributing whatever he had done to the munificence of Henry VI.

== Family ==
Cooke married Catherine, daughter of Richard Sleech, canon of Windsor, in January 1746, and had by her twelve children. The eldest daughter Elizabeth Anne married Benjamin Way; the second daughter, Catherine, married Samuel Hallifax, whose epitaph was written by Cooke. One of his sons, Edward Cooke, became secretary at war in Ireland. Another son, William Cooke, was fellow of King's College, Cambridge, professor of Greek at Cambridge from 1780 to 1792, and rector of Hempstead-with-Lessingham, Norfolk, from 1785 until his death, 3 May 1824.

Academic offices
Preceded by William George	Head Master of Eton College; 1743–1745	Succeeded by John Sumner
Preceded by John Sumner	Provost of King's College; 1772–1797	Succeeded by Humphrey Sumner
Church of England titles
Preceded by Hugh Thomas	Dean of Ely; 1780–1797	Succeeded by William Pearce
