= John Davie (academic) =

English academic (1777–1813)

John Davie, D.D. (13 September 1777, in Debenham – 10 October 1813, in Bungay) was an academic in the late eighteenth and early nineteenth centuries.

Davie was educated at Ipswich School and Sidney Sussex College, Cambridge. He was a Fellow of Sidney Sussex from 1801, the year he was ordained a priest in the Church of England. He was Master of Sidney Sussex from 1811, and Vice-Chancellor of the University of Cambridge from 1812, holding both positions until his death.
