= Lowther Yates =

English priest and academic

Lowther Yates, D.D. was a priest and academic in the second half of the 18th century.

Yates was born in Whitehaven, and educated at St Catharine's College, Cambridge, graduating BA in 1751, M.A in 1754 and B.D in 1774. He was Fellow of St Catharine's from 1757 to 1779 and its Master from 1779 to 1798. He was Vice-Chancellor of the University of Cambridge from 1779 to 1780, and from 1794 to 1795. Yates was ordained on 22 December 1755. His first post was as curate to his father at Gargrave. He became Rector of Carrigaline in 1779.
