= John Watson (Master of Christ's College, Cambridge) =

John Watson, D.D. was a priest and academic in the late fifteenth and early sixteenth centuries.

Watson was educated at Christ's College, Cambridge, graduating B.A. in 1498; MA in 1501; and B.D. in 1513. He held livings at Elsworth, White Notley and St Mary Woolnoth in the City of London. He was Fellow of Christ's from 1501 to 1516; and Master of Christ's from 1517 to 1531. He was twice Vice Chancellor of the University of Cambridge: from 1518 to 1520, and from 1530 to 1532.

He died in March 1537.
