= Samuel Blythe =

English scholar and priest (died 1713)

Samuel Blythe was master of Clare College from 1678 until his death.

Blythe was born in Doncaster and educated at Clare College, Cambridge. He became fellow in 1658. He was ordained a deacon in the Church of England in 1667. He held livings at Everton, Bedfordshire and Newton-in-the-Isle. Blythe was vice-chancellor of the University of Cambridge between 1684 and 1685.

He died on 19 April 1713.
