= Edward Atkinson (academic) =

English academic and priest (1819–1915)

Edward Atkinson (6 August 1819, Leeds – 1 March 1915, Cambridge) was Master of Clare College from 1856 to his death.

Atkinson was educated at Leeds Grammar School and Clare College, Cambridge, matriculating in 1838, gaining a scholarship, graduating B.A. (3rd classic) 1842, M.A. 1845, B.D. 1853, D.D. 1859.

He became Fellow of Clare in 1842; and was ordained a priest of the Church of England in 1844; He was Vice-Chancellor of the University of Cambridge 1862–1863, 1868–1870, and 1876–1878.
