= John Madew =

English churchman and academic

John Madew (died 1555) was an English churchman and academic, Regius Professor of Divinity at Cambridge and Master of Clare Hall.

== Life ==
From Lancashire, Madew became Fellow of St John's College, Cambridge in 1530. He graduated M.A, in 1533, then B.D. in 1543 and D. D. in 1546. His appointment as Regius Professor was around 1545. He was vice-chancellor on four occasions.

Madew became Master of Clare Hall after Roland Swynbourne, a committed Catholic, was ejected. He himself was removed from the post, after Queen Mary came to the throne in 1553.

In 1548 as Vice-chancellor Madew stopped a proposed disputation by Roger Ascham on the Eucharist. The next year, on 20 June, there was an official disputation on a similar topic. In the audience, in the philosophy schools, were William Parr, 1st Marquess of Northampton, and all the college Visitors. Madew was required to defend the Protestant side, against Alban Langdale, William Glyn and others. On that occasion Nicholas Ridley, there as a moderator of the discussion, frequently took up the argument rather than letting Madew speak.

At the end of his life Madew was reconciled to the Catholic church.

== Notes ==
Academic offices
Preceded by Edward Wigan	Regius Professor of Divinity at Cambridge c. 1545	Succeeded by Martin Bucer
