= John Sumner (priest) =

English cleric and academic

John Sumner DD (d. 26 February 1772) was an English cleric and academic, Provost of King's College, Cambridge from 1756.

== Career ==
He the son of William Sumner, born in Windsor. He was educated at Eton College and matriculated in 1724 at King's College, Cambridge, graduating BA in 1729, MA in 1732, and DD in 1744.

Sumner was appointed a Fellow of King's College in 1727. He was ordained deacon in 1730. He was an assistant master and undermaster at Eton College, 1734–1745, and then its Headmaster, 1745–1754.

As a cleric, Sumner was Rector of Barwick-in-Elmet, Yorkshire, 1750–1772, and Rector of Castleford, 1753–1772. He served as Canon of Windsor from 1751 to 1772. At the end of his life, he was perpetual curate of St Benet Fink in the City of London, during 1772.

Sumner became Provost of King's College, Cambridge in 1756. He served as Vice-Chancellor of the University of Cambridge 1756–1757, and 1770–1771. Sumner's library was sold some time after his death, on 16 May (and three following days) 1814 by R. H. Evans in London. A copy of the sale catalogue is held at Cambridge University Library (shelfmark Munby.c.163(3)).

== Family ==
Sumner was married, and had sons including:

- Robert Sumner, a cleric, father of John Bird Sumner and Charles Richard Sumner
- Richard
- Humphrey Sumner

== Notes ==
Academic offices
Preceded by William Cooke	Head Master of Eton College; 1745–1754	Succeeded by Edward Barnard
Academic offices
Preceded by William George	Provost of King's College, Cambridge; 1756–1772	Succeeded by William Cooke
Academic offices
Preceded by Edmund Law	Vice-Chancellor of the University of Cambridge; 1756–1757	Succeeded by John Green
Preceded by William Richardson	Vice-Chancellor of the University of Cambridge; 1770–1771	Succeeded by James Brown (academic)
