= William Colman =

English priest & academic (1728-1794)

William Colman, D.D. (6 January 1728 – 26 December 1794) was a priest and academic in the second half of the eighteenth century.

Colman was born in Northamptonshire. He was educated at Corpus Christi College, Cambridge, graduating B.A. in 1750; MA in 1750; and B.D. in 1761. He was appointed Fellow in 1759; and Master in 1778. He was Vice-Chancellor of the University of Cambridge from 1779 to 1780; and again from 1793 to 1794. He was ordained in 1756 and was the incumbent at St Bene't's Church from 1759 to 1773; and then of St Mary, Stalbridge from then until his death.
