= Inagaki Manjirō =

Japanese diplomat

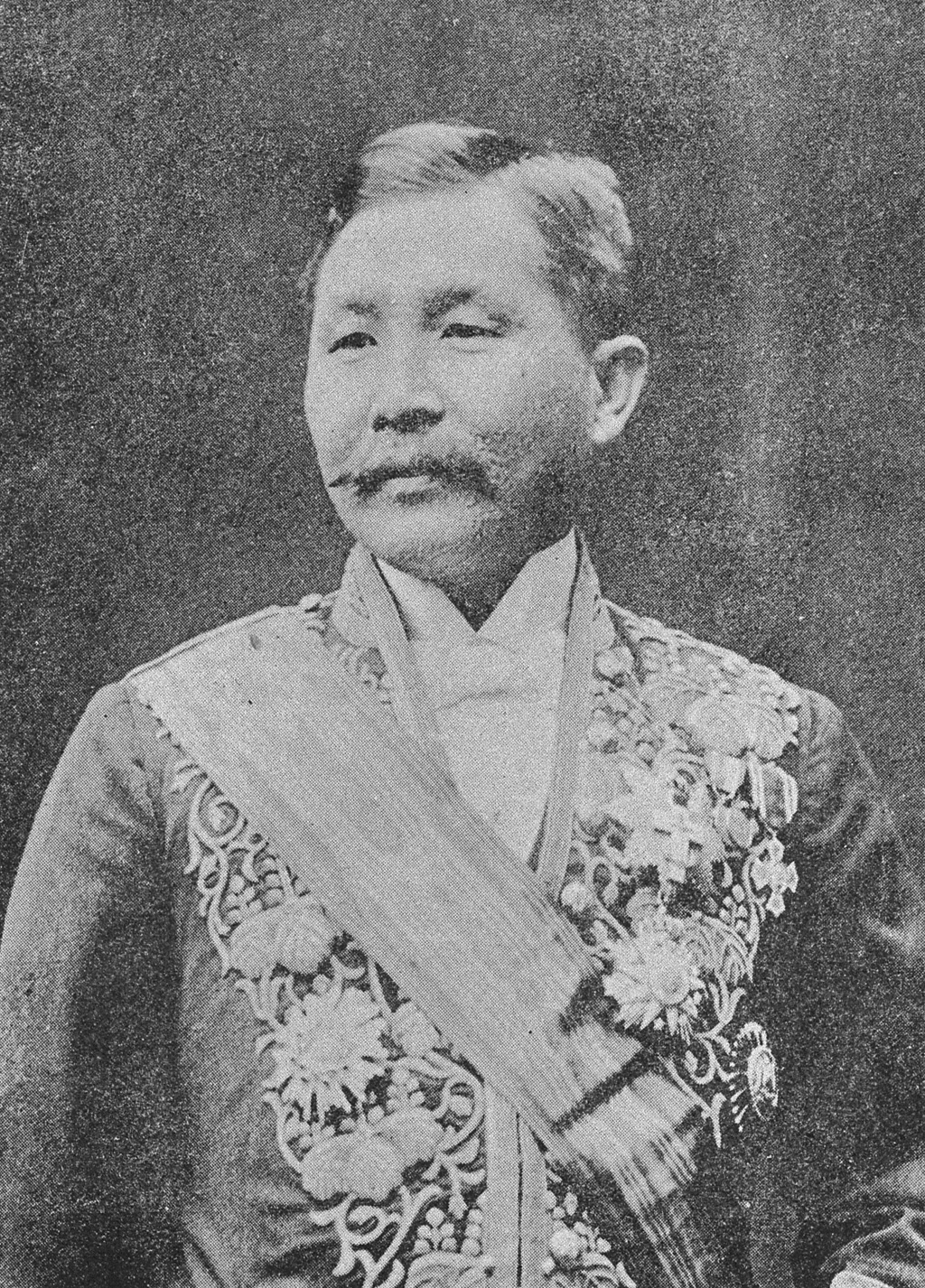
- Inagaki Manjirō from Nagasaki Ken Jinbutsu Den (Biographies of Nagasaki prefecture)
- Born: September 26, 1861; Nagasaki, Japan
- Died: September 26, 1908 (aged 47); Madrid, Spain
- Occupation: Diplomat

Inagaki Manjirō (稲垣 満次郎; September 26, 1861 – November 25, 1908) was a Japanese diplomat and political theorist who was active during the Meiji period of Japan.

== Early life ==
Inagaki was born in Nagasaki, as the son of a samurai of the Hirado Domain. As a young man he was a warder of the Satsuma men imprisoned in Nagasaki after the unsuccessful Satsuma Rebellion and gained their respect and affection.

After studying at the clan-established Ishinkan and Kagoshima Shigakko (private school), he entered the Department of Literature of the Tokyo Imperial University in 1882. Sent down from Tokyo University with many others after the Incident of 1883, when the student body rebelled and boycotted the graduation ceremonies because the time of the ceremony was changed, he never returned, unlike most of the others. Instead, Inagaki went to Britain from January 1888 to December 1890 and studied at Gonville and Caius College, Cambridge. He also founded the Japanese Club at Cambridge University to study the ways of English gentlemen. He also studied classical literature and is the first Japanese known to have learned Greek. He became a very popular figure at the University, especially with the Master of Pembroke College and the Vice-Chancellor, the Reverend Dr. Charles Edward Searle.

== Later life ==
After graduating Inagaki returned to Japan, and became a temporary professor at Gakushuin Higher Commercial School. He entered the Foreign Ministry and became Japan's first deputy Minister Resident to the Kingdom of Siam on March 31, 1897. He was appointed Minister Plenipotentiary on 19 November 1899 and envoy extraordinary and Minister Plenipotentiary in 1903. He continued in that role until July 1907, when he was transferred to Madrid, Spain, where he died of illness in 1908.

Inagaki wrote a number of scholarly books in English and Japanese on international affairs but died relatively young with his potential unfulfilled. His writings urging Japanese expansionism into the South Pacific were part of the theoretical basis of the Southern Expansion Doctrine of the Imperial Japanese Navy and certain factions in the government in the early 20th century.

== Writings ==
=== English ===
- Japan and the Pacific and the Japanese View of the Eastern Question, 1890 (London: T. Fisher Unwin) - dedicated to John Robert Seeley who taught Inagaki at Gonville and Caius College.

=== Japanese ===
- Tohosaku (Policy for the East) (1891).
- Shiberia tetsudoron (On the Siberian railways) (1891).
- Kizokuron (On the nobility) (1891, 1893, 1894)
- Kyoiku no Omoto (Great Fount of Education) (1894)
- Nanyo Chosei dan (Expedition to the South seas) (1893)
- Gaiko to Gaisei (Diplomacy and Foreign Campaigns) (1896)

== See also ==
- Kikuchi Dairoku
- Suematsu Kencho
- Donald MacAlister
- Anglo-Japanese relations
- Japanese students in Britain
