= Peter Godard =

English priest and academic (1705–1781)

Peter Stephen Godard, D.D. (b & d. Cambridge 28 August 1705 - 11 July 1781) was Master of Clare College from 1762 until his death.

Godard was educated at Merchant Taylors' and Clare College, Cambridge. He became Fellow in 1727. He was ordained a priest in the Church of England in 1730. He held incumbencies at Fornham All Saints and Whepstead. Godard was Vice-Chancellor of the University of Cambridge between 1762 and 1763.
