= George Rooke (priest) =

English priest and academic (1702–1754)

George Henry Rooke, D.D. (3 August 1702 – 7 February 1754) was an English priest and academic in the eighteenth century.

Rooke was born in Carlisle. He was educated at Christ's College, Cambridge, graduating B.A. in 1725 and MA in 1728. He became Fellow of Christ's in 1727; and was Master from 1745 until his death. He was Vice-Chancellor of the University of Cambridge from 1745 to 1746. He held livings in Cambridge, Great Eversden, Little Abington, Foxton, Hadstock and Great Horkesley.
