= John Power (Master of Pembroke College, Cambridge) =

British academic (1819–1880)

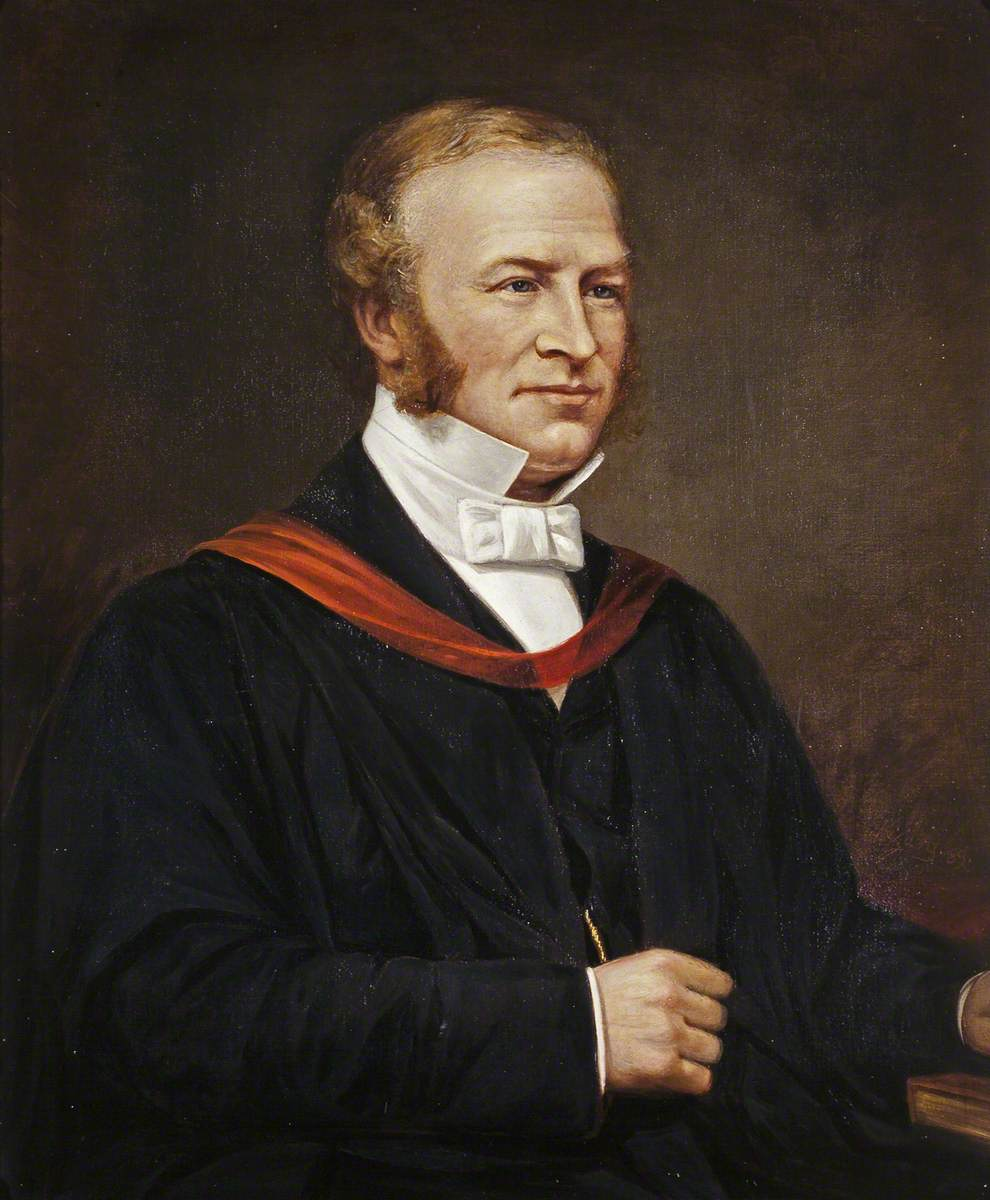
John Power by Worthy Vizard

John Power, D.D. (13 June 1819 – 18 November 1880) was a British academic in the 19th century, who served as Master of Pembroke College, Cambridge, from 1870 until his death.

Power was born on 13 June 1819 in Freasley, Warwickshire. He was educated at Pembroke College, Cambridge, graduating B.A. in 1841, and M.A. in 1844. Power was elected Fellow of Pembroke in 1841; and Master in 1870. He was twice Vice-Chancellor of the University of Cambridge, between 1870 and 1872 and 1878 to 1879.

Power died in Cambridge on 18 November 1880.

Academic offices
Preceded by Gilbert Ainslie	Master of Pembroke College, Cambridge; 1870–1880	Succeeded by Charles Edward Searle
