= Robert Lambert (academic) =

English priest and academic (1677–1735)

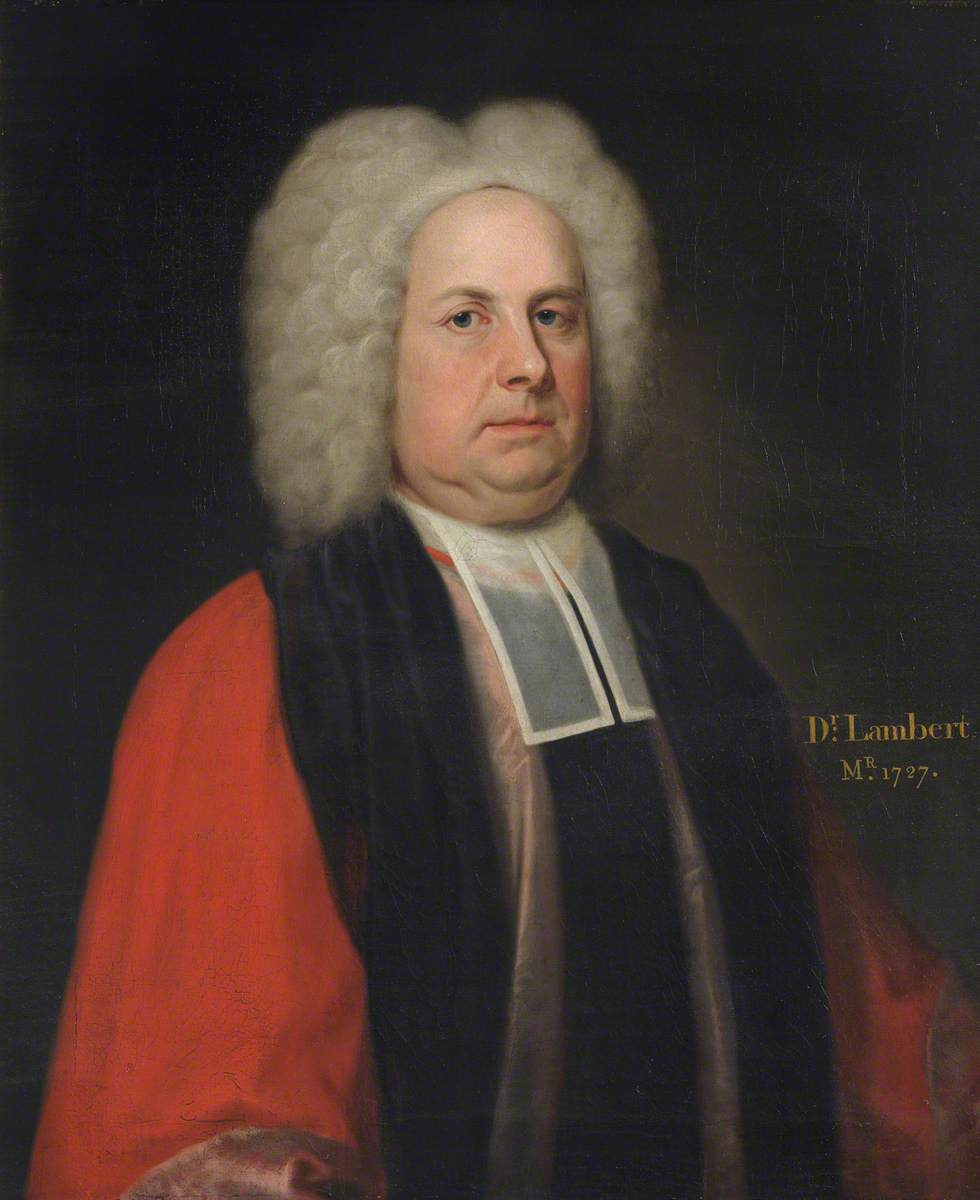
Robert Lambert by John Theodore Heins

Robert Lambert, D.D. (Beverley 21 April 1677 – Cambridge 25 January 1735) was an English priest and academic in the second half of the 18th and the first decades of the 19th centuries.

Lambert educated at St John's College, Cambridge. He graduated B.A. in 1697, and M.A. in 1700; and was a Fellow of St John's from then until his appointment as Master in 1727. Ordained in 1706, he was Vice-Chancellor of the University of Cambridge from 1727 until 1728, and again from 1729 until 1730.
