= Robert Cory =

English moral philosopher (1759–1835)

Robert Towerson Cory (1759 – 23 April 1835) was an English churchman and Professor of moral philosophy at the University of Cambridge.

== Life and career ==
Robert Towerson Cory was born in Cambridge and educated at the local Perse School. He matriculated at Emmanuel College in 1776, as a sizar and graduated as fifth wrangler in the Mathematical Tripos in 1780.

He then began a career in the church and was ordained deacon of Bath and Wells on 26 May 1781. There followed other church livings including Reverend of Kilken (or Kilkern), Flintshire in 1813. In 1790 he took his Bachelor of Divinity.

Cory was elected a Fellow of Emmanuel College in 1782. After the death of Richard Farmer he was chosen as Master of Emmanuel, and held the office until his death in 1835. It was said that his mastership "was chiefly remarkable for the improvements in the College's finances, which Farmer had left in some disorder".

He was twice Vice-chancellor at Cambridge, in 1797-8 and 1813–14. In 1809 he was elected Knightbridge Professor of Moral Philosophy, which he held until 1813. He did not however, give any lectures or publish anything.

He died in Cambridge at Emmanuel Lodge on 23 April 1835 aged 76.

Cory married Ann Apthorp, at St Andrew the Great, Cambridge on 10 April 1798.
