= John Whalley (theologian) =

(1699–1748) Master of Peterhouse Cambridge

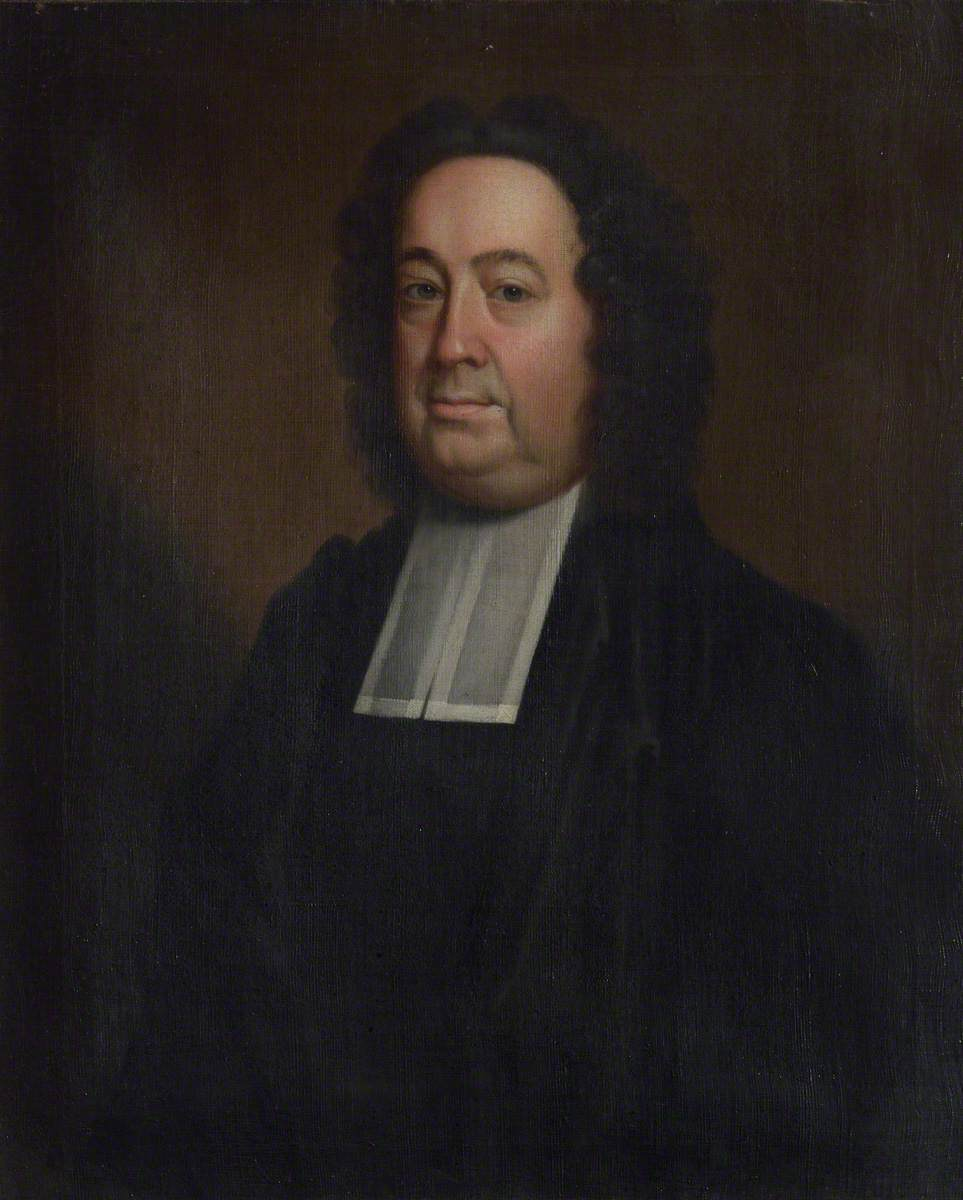
John Whalley

John Whalley (1699 – 12 December 1748) was an English academic at the University of Cambridge, clergyman, and poet.

Whalley was the son of John Whalley, Rector of Riddlesworth, Norfolk.

He was educated at Pembroke College, Cambridge, matriculating in 1715, graduating B.A. 1720, M.A. 1723, B.D. 1732, D.D. 1737 (from Peterhouse). He was appointed a Fellow of Pembroke College in 1721, Taxor in 1730, and served as Master of Peterhouse, Cambridge 1733–48, Vice-Chancellor of the University of Cambridge 1738–39, and Regius Professor of Divinity 1742–48.

Ordained deacon in 1724 and priest in 1725, he held the following livings in the church:

- Rector of Hungry Hatley, Cambridgeshire, 1728
- Vicar of Shepreth, Cambridgeshire, 1730
- Vicar of Hatley St George, Cambridgeshire, 1731–32
- Vicar of Tilney, Norfolk, 1732–48
- Rector of Glaston, Rutland, 1734
- Rector of Somersham, Huntingdonshire, 1742–48

Whalley was also a poet, who composed Cuddy, why sitten wee thus mute, ne cast (1738), a rustic elegy for Queen Caroline imitating the style of Edmund Spenser. Whalley was Master of Peterhouse when the poet Thomas Gray was a student then a Fellow there; Gray wrote that Whalley hated him, and had described him publicly as "a kind of atheist".

== Family ==
Whalley married Mary Squire, daughter of Francis Squire, Chancellor of Wells Cathedral. They had the following children:

- John Whalley (1737–1763), officer in the 23rd Regiment (Welch Fusiliers), died on a voyage to India
- Susan Whalley (1739–), married Dr. Crane
- Mary Whalley (1742–1817), married James Wickham
- Francis Edwardes Whalley (1743–1813), Colonel of the Somerset Militia
- Elizabeth Whalley (1745–1778), married Isaac Sage
- Thomas Sedgwick Whalley (1746–1828), clergyman and writer
- Richard Chapple Whalley (1748–1817), clergyman
