= John Coplestone =

John Coplestone, D.D. (1623–1689) was an English priest and academic.

Coplestone was born at Lyme Regis and educated at Eton College. He entered King's College, Cambridge in 1641, graduating B.A in 1645 and M.A in 1648. He was appointed a Fellow of Kings in 1649. He was Rector of Brompton Ralph from 1669 and Provost of King's College, Cambridge from 1681, holding both positions until his death on 24 August 1689. He was Vice-Chancellor of the University of Cambridge from 1682 to 1683.
