= William Elliston (academic) =

English academic (1777–1807)

William Elliston, D.D. (13 September 1777 – 11 February 1807) was an academic in the late eighteenth and early nineteenth centuries.

Elliston was born at Great Bardfield and educated at St John's College, Cambridge. He was a Fellow of Sidney Sussex College, Cambridge, from 1758 to 1760; and Master of Sidney from 1860 until his death at Bungay on 11 February 1807. He was twice Vice-Chancellor of the University of Cambridge: from 1763 to 1764, and 1786 to 1787. Elliston was ordained a priest of the Church of England in 1759 and was Rector of Keyston from 1764 until his death.
