= Charles Taylor (Hebraist) =

English Christian Hebraist (1840–1908)

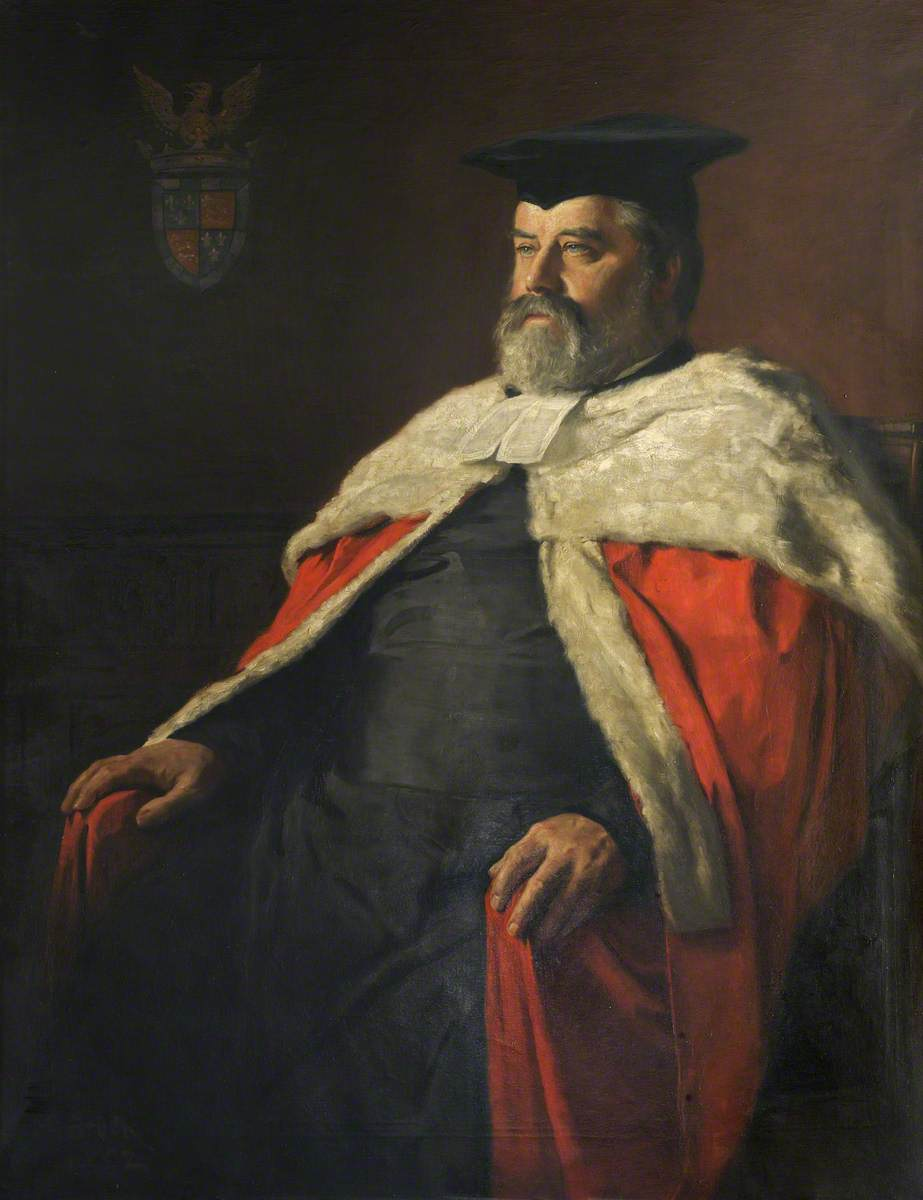
- Born: 27 May 1840; London
- Died: 12 August 1908 (aged 68); Nuremberg

Academic background
- Education: St. John's College, Cambridge

Academic work
- Discipline: Christian Hebraist

Charles Taylor (1840–1908) was an English Christian Hebraist.

== Life ==
Taylor was born on 27 May 1840 in London. He was educated at King's College School, and St. John's College, Cambridge, where he graduated BA as 9th wrangler in 1862 and became a fellow of his college in 1864. He became Master of St John's in 1881. In 1874 he published an edition of Coheleth; in 1877 Sayings of the Jewish Fathers, an elaborate edition of the Pirḳe Abot (2 ed., 1897); and in 1899 a valuable appendix giving a list of manuscripts.

Taylor discovered the Jewish source of the Didache in his Teaching of the Twelve Apostles, 1886, and published also an Essay on the Theology of the Didache, 1889.

Taylor took a great interest in Solomon Schechter's work on Cairo Geniza, and the genizah fragments presented to the University of Cambridge are known as the Taylor-Schechter Collection. He was joint editor with Schechter of The Wisdom of Ben Sira, 1899. He published separately Cairo Genizah Palimpsests, 1900.

He wrote also several works on geometry and participated in the creation and running of the journal Messenger of Mathematics.

On 19 October 1907 he married Margaret Sophia Dillon, daughter of the Hon. Conrad Dillon.

He died in Nuremberg on 12 August 1908 and is buried in the Parish of the Ascension Burial Ground in Cambridge.

Academic offices
Preceded by William Henry Bateson	Master of St John's College, Cambridge; 1881–1908	Succeeded by Robert Forsyth Scott
Preceded by Charles Swainson	Vice-Chancellor of the University of Cambridge; 1886–1888	Succeeded by Charles Edward Searle
