= Edmund Boldero =

English theologian (1608–1679)

Edmund Boldero (1608–1679) was an English royalist clergyman and academic, Master of Jesus College, Cambridge from 1663.

== Life ==
He was a native of Bury St. Edmunds in Suffolk. He was educated at Ipswich School and Pembroke College, Cambridge, where he matriculated as a pensioner in 1626, graduated B.A. in 1629 and M.A. in 1632, and was admitted to a fellowship on 4 February 1631, and took the degree of M.A.

He became curate of St. Lawrence, Ipswich, in 1643. Soon after the establishment of the Commonwealth he was ejected from his fellowship and sent a prisoner to London, where he was detained for a long time. He was subsequently in Scotland under the Marquis of Montrose.

On the Restoration he was created D.D. at Cambridge by royal mandate. Matthew Wren, Bishop of Ely, to whom he was chaplain, presented him to the rectory of Glemsford, Suffolk, on 15 February 1662, and also to the rectories of Westerfield and Harkstead in the same county. Wren then nominated him master of Jesus College, Cambridge, where he was admitted on 26 April 1663, and presented him to the rectory of Snailwell, Cambridgeshire, on 13 July in the same year. Boldero was vice-chancellor of the university in 1668, when in November he forbade the use of the arguments of Descartes in disputations, and also suspended Daniel Scargill for Hobbism in disputation; and in 1674. He died at Cambridge on 5 July 1679, and was buried in Jesus College chapel.

== Notes ==
Academic offices
Preceded by Joseph Beaumont	Master of Jesus College, Cambridge; 1663–1679	Succeeded by Humphrey Gower
