= Thomas Page (academic) =

Sir Thomas Page (1613 – 8 August 1681) was an English academic.

Page was born at Uxenden and educated at Eton College. He entered King's College, Cambridge in 1628, graduating B.A. in 1632 and M.A. in 1636. He was Fellow of Kings from 1631 to 1675; and Provost from 1675 to his death on 8 August 1681. He was Vice-Chancellor of the University of Cambridge from 1676 to 1677. Page was also Chief Secretary to James Butler, 1st Duke of Ormond, Lord Lieutenant of Ireland from 1643 to 1646. He was knighted on 19 September 1675.
