= Edward Hawford =

English churchman and academic

Edward Hawford D.D. (died 1582) was an English churchman and academic, Master of Christ's College, Cambridge from 1559. While Hawford was a somewhat conservative and administrative-minded academic politician head of house, no friend of religious enthusiasm and suspected of covert Catholicism. Christ's became a Puritan centre under his mastership.

== Life ==
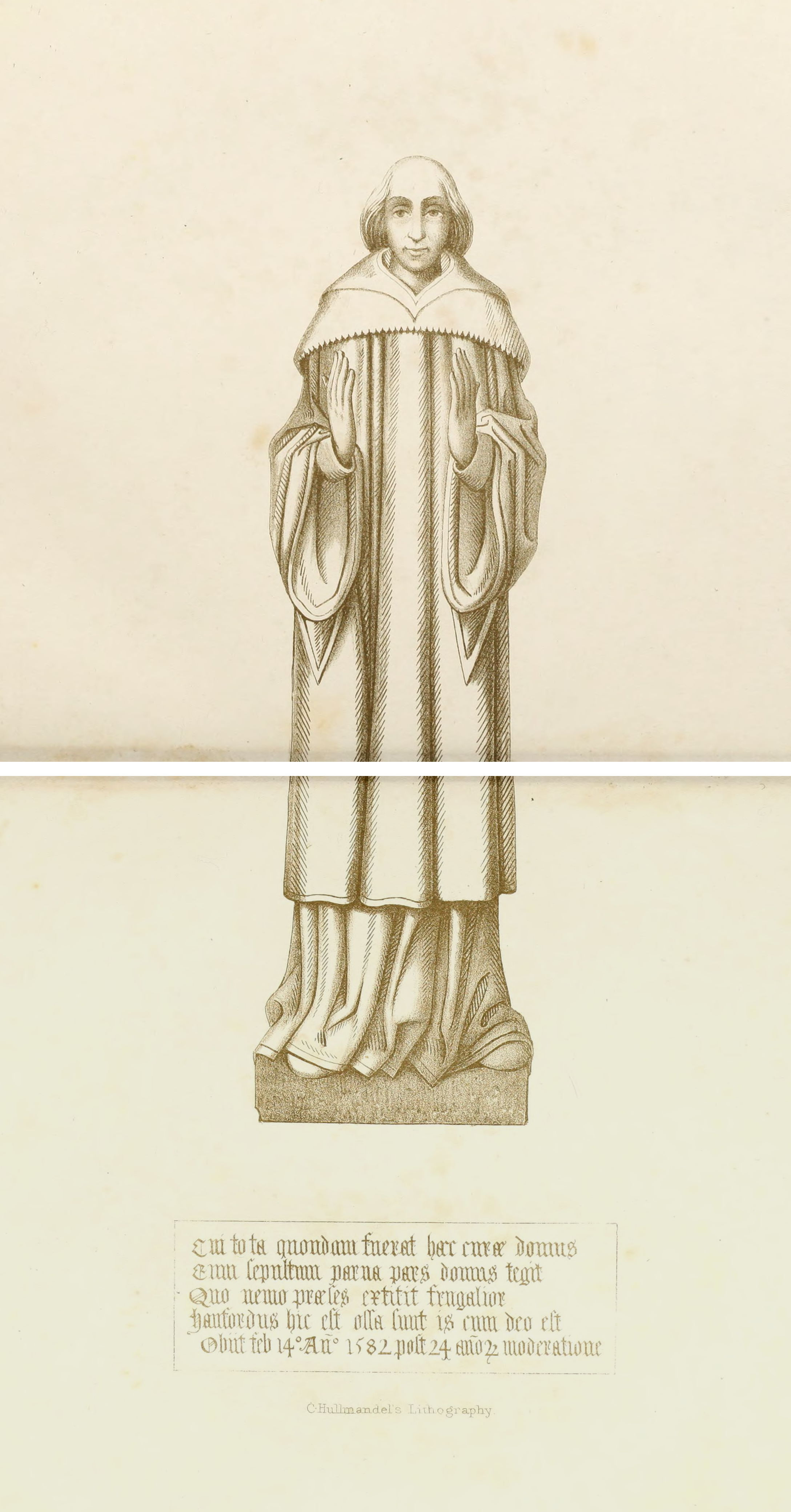
Memorial brass to Edward Hawford in the college chapel.

He was son of Thomas Hawford and his wife Margaret Wade of Clipston, Northamptonshire. He was a student of Jesus College, Cambridge, graduated B.A. in 1543, was elected fellow of Christ's College, and commenced M.A. in 1545.

Hawford was proctor in 1552. In 1553 he became rector of Glemsford in Suffolk. On 12 June 1554 he was instituted rector of two-thirds of the rectory of Clipston, and subscribed the Roman Catholic articles in 1555. He was elected master of Christ's College in 1559, and on 14 February 1561 was collated to a prebend in Chester Cathedral.

In 1563 Hawford was made vice-chancellor of the university, and, having taken the degree of D.D. in 1564, was still in office when Queen Elizabeth visited Cambridge on 5 August Hawford did his share in receiving her, and took part in the divinity act held in her presence. The dean and chapter of Norwich Cathedral sent him £100 in 1569 as an acknowledgment of the help which he had given them in the matter of their charter, and he bestowed the money on his college. He also made an addition to the college garden. He was one of the heads mainly responsible for the new university statutes drawn up in 1570: they displeased the Puritan party at Cambridge, who decried their supporters, and Hawford was accused of having dragged his feet in removing Catholic books and vestments from his college. On 11 December he was one of the assessors of the vice-chancellor in the proceedings against Thomas Cartwright.

Hawford was appointed one of the visitors of St John's College and helped to revise its statutes in 1575–6. The majority of the fellows of Christ's College were unhappy at his ejection of the Puritan Hugh Broughton from his fellowship in 1579, and wrote to the chancellor and to Sir Walter Mildmay against his action. Hawford refused to give way, but his decision was reversed in 1581.

Hawford died on 14 February 1582, as is stated on the brass placed to his memory in the college chapel. He left money to the college in his will.

== Notes ==
Attribution

This article incorporates text from a publication now in the public domain: Stephen, Leslie; Lee, Sidney, eds. (1891). "Hawford, Edward". Dictionary of National Biography. Vol. 25. London: Smith, Elder & Co.
