= William French (educator) =

British educator (1786–1849)

William French, D.D. (1786–1849) was master of Jesus College, Cambridge.

== Life ==
French was the son of a rich yeoman at Eye, Suffolk. He was sent to Ipswich Grammar School, where the Rev. Mr. Howarth was head-master, and he afterwards entered Caius College, Cambridge. After a successful college career he came out in 1811 as second wrangler, the senior being Thomas Edward Dicey of Trinity, the two being bracketed equal as Smith's prizemen. Soon after French was elected fellow and tutor of Pembroke College, and in 1814 took his M.A. degree. He was only thirty-four years old in 1820 when he was appointed master of Jesus College by Bowyer Sparke, bishop of Ely, in whose family he had been private tutor.

In the following year he was made D.D. by royal mandate, and served the office of vice-chancellor, a position which he filled again in 1834, when he also acted as one of the syndics appointed to superintend the building of the Fitzwilliam Museum. He was presented by the lord chancellor to the living of Moor Monkton, Yorkshire, in 1827, and became a canon of Ely in 1832. He discharged his various functions with urbanity and integrity. His mathematical attainments were of the highest order, and to classical scholarship he added a considerable acquaintance with oriental languages. He took a distinguished part in the translations made by himself and Mr. George Skinner of the Psalms and Proverbs. He managed the affairs of his college so as greatly to improve its finances, and his name is connected with the remarkable restoration of Jesus College Chapel, begun under his direction by his gift of coloured glass for the eastern triplet.

He died at Jesus Lodge, Cambridge, on 12 Nov. 1849, in his sixty-third year, and was buried at Brockdish in Norfolk four days later.

== Works ==
- A new Translation of the Book of Psalms from the original Hebrew, with Explanatory Notes by W. French, D.D., and George Skinner, M.A.; a new edition, with corrections and additions, 8vo, London, 1842. ‘A judicious and excellent work for review’ (see British Critic, ix. 404).
- A new Translation of the Proverbs of Solomon from the original Hebrew, with Explanatory Notes by W. French, D.D., and George Skinner, M.A., 8vo, London, 1831.
