= Robert Forsyth Scott =

British mathematician (1849–1933)

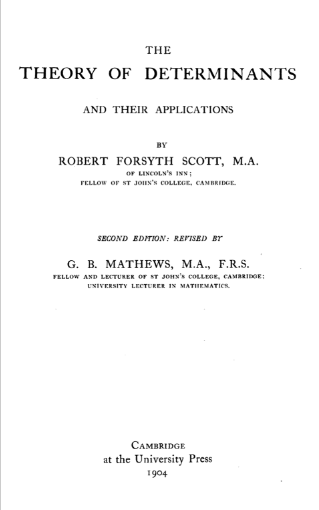

Sir Robert Forsyth Scott (28 July 1849 – 18 November 1933) was a mathematician, barrister and Master of St John's College, Cambridge

== Life ==
Scott was born in Leith, near Edinburgh, the eldest son of Reverend George Scott, a Minister in the church at Dairsie and Mary Forsyth, daughter of the Edinburgh advocate Robert Forsyth.

Scott was educated at the High School, Edinburgh, then in Stuttgart before becoming a student at University College, London. In 1870, while a student at University College, London, he was awarded a Whitworth Exhibition. He went on to read mathematics at St John's College, where he was fourth wrangler in the Tripos in 1875 and was elected to a fellowship in 1877.

After publishing The Theory of Determinants and Their Applications in 1880, Scott turned his attention to the law, become a barrister in 1883, and to institutional history, including histories of St. John's College, Cambridge, published between 1882 and 1907. In 1908 he was appointed as the Master of St John's College, a position he held until his death in Cambridge in 1933, and from 1910 to 1912 he served as Vice-chancellor of the University. On his death he left the library of St John's one of the largest collection of Burmese manuscripts in Europe.

He was the elder brother of Sir James George Scott.

== Publications ==
- History of St John's College, Cambridge
- The theory of determinants and their applications (2nd ed., revised by George Ballard Mathews), Cambridge University Press, 1904.

Academic offices
Preceded by Charles Taylor	Master of St John's College, Cambridge; 1908–1933	Succeeded by Ernest Alfred Benians
Preceded by Arthur James Mason	Vice-Chancellor of the University of Cambridge; 1910–1912	Succeeded by Stuart Alexander Donaldson
