= Humphrey Sumner =

English Anglican priest and educationalist

Humphrey Sumner (b Eton 15 September 1743; d Cambridge 23 March 1814) was an English Anglican priest and educationalist.

The son of John Sumner, Headmaster of Eton he was himself educated at the college. He entered King's College, Cambridge in 1762, graduating B.A in 1767 and M.A in 1770. He was appointed a Fellow of Kings in 1765; and on the staff of Eton from 1767 to 1790. He held livings at Dunton Wayletts, Copdock and Washbrook. Sumner was Provost of King's College, Cambridge from 1797 until his death; and twice Vice-Chancellor of the University of Cambridge: from 1798 to 1799, and 1802 to 1803.
