= Ralph Tatham =

Ralph Tatham (bap. 1778–1857) was an English academic and churchman.

== Life ==
He graduated at the University of Cambridge in 1803. He became Master of St John's College, Cambridge, Public Orator (1809–1839), and Vice-Chancellor(1839–1840). He was also Rector (1816–1857) of Colkirk, Norfolk.

Academic offices
Preceded by Edmund Outram	Cambridge University Orator	Succeeded by Christopher Wordsworth
Preceded by James Wood	Master of St John's College, Cambridge; 1839–1857	Succeeded by William Henry Bateson
