= John Eachard =

English divine and satirist

- Born: 1636?
- Died: 7 July 1697
- Occupation: satirist

John Eachard (1636? – 7 July 1697) was an English divine and satirist, noted for his humorous descriptions of the contemporary clergy.

From Yoxford in Suffolk, he was educated at St Catharine's College, Cambridge, of which he became master in 1675 in succession to John Lightfoot. He was created D.D. in 1676 by royal mandate, and was twice (in 1679 and 1695) vice-chancellor of Cambridge University.

In 1670 he had published anonymously a humorous satire entitled The Ground and Occasions of the Contempt of the Clergy enquired into in a letter written to R. L., which excited much attention and provoked several replies, one of them being from John Owen. These were met by Some Observations, etc., in a second letter to R. L. (1671), written in the same bantering tone as the original work. Eachard attributed the contempt into which the clergy had fallen to their imperfect education, their insufficient incomes, and the want of a true vocation. His descriptions, which were somewhat exaggerated, were largely used by Macaulay in his History of England.

He gave amusing illustrations of the absurdity and poverty of the current pulpit oratory of his day, some of them being taken from the sermons of his own father. He attacked the philosophy of Thomas Hobbes in his Mr. Hobbs State of Nature considered; in a dialogue between Philautus and Timothy (1672), and in his Some Opinions of Mr.. Hobbs considered in a second dialogue (1673). These were written in their author's chosen vein of light satire, and John Dryden praised them as highly effective within their own range. Eachard's own sermons, however, were not superior to those he satirized. Jonathan Swift alludes to him as a signal instance of a successful humorist who entirely failed as a serious writer.

A collected edition of his works in three volumes, with a notice of his life, was published in 1774. The Contempt of the Clergy was reprinted in E. Arbors English Garner. A Free Enquiry into the Causes of the very great Esteem that the Nonconforming Preachers are generally in with their Followers (1673) has been attributed to Eachard on insufficient grounds.

== Notes ==
Academic offices
Preceded by John Lightfoot	Master of St Catharine's College, Cambridge; 1675-1697	Succeeded by William Dawes
