= John Edmunds (English academic) =

English academic (died 1544)

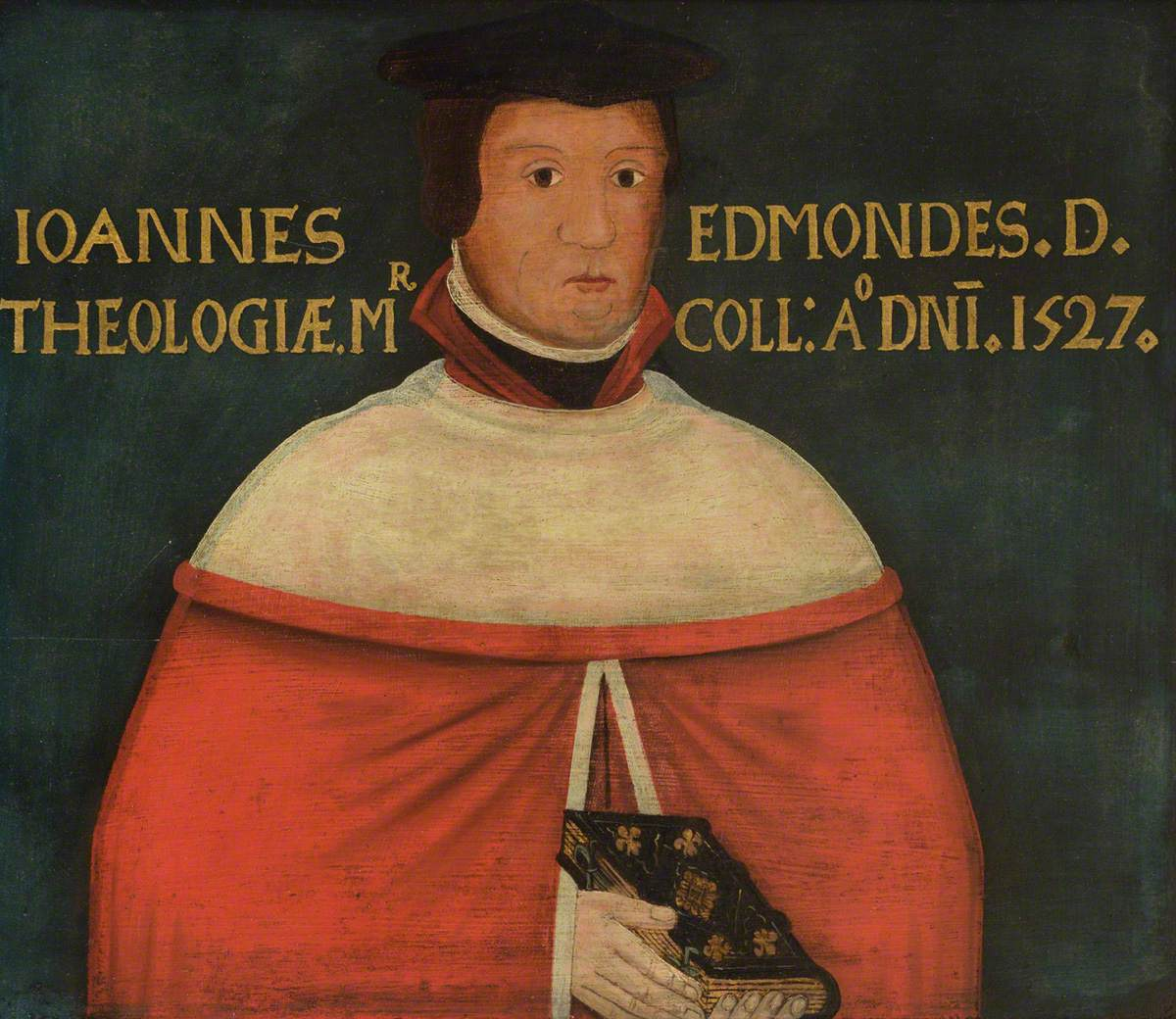
John Edmunds

John Edmunds (died 1544) was master of Peterhouse, Cambridge.

Edmunds proceeded B.A. 1503–4, M.A. 1507, was admitted fellow of Jesus College, Cambridge, 1517, and afterwards fellow of St. John's 1519. He was prebendary of St. Paul's Cathedral 1510–17, and chancellor 1517–29. He commenced D.D. 1520, being then a member of Peterhouse; was Lady Margaret preacher 1521, was elected master of Peterhouse 1522, vice-chancellor 1523–8–9, 1541–3, and became chancellor of Salisbury Cathedral. He also held a prebend in the same church.

He died in November 1544 and was buried in the Church of St. Mary, outside Trumpington gates. He married a sister of the wife of John Mere. He was one of the compilers of ‘The Institution of a Christian Man.’
