= Lynford Caryl =

English priest and academic (died 1781)

Lynford Caryl, D.D. was an English academic, Master of Jesus College, Cambridge from 1758 until 1771.

Caryl was born in Cotgrave and educated at Jesus College, Cambridge, graduating B.A. in 1728; and M.A. in 1732. He was ordained on 13 June 1729 and held livings at Fordham, Cambridge and Barnburgh. He was Fellow of Jesus from 1733 to 1750; Registrary of the University of Cambridge from 1751 to 1758; and twice Vice-chancellor of the University of Cambridge, between 1758 and 1759 and 1773 to 1774.

He died at Canterbury on 18 June 1781.
