= John Chevallier =

John Chevallier, FRS (Great Casterton, 10 June 1730 - Cambridge, 14 March 1789) was an eighteenth-century academic, most notably Master of St John's College, Cambridge from 1775 until his death and Vice Chancellor of the University of Cambridge from 1776 until 1777.

He was born the son of Nathaniel Chevalier, a clergyman of Great Casterton, Rutland, and educated at Stamford School and St John's College, Cambridge, where he was awarded BA in 1750/51, MA in 1754, BD in 1762 and DD in 1777.

He was elected a Fellow of the Royal Society in 1754 for, according to his candidature citation, "his known Zeal for the Newtonian Philosophy, of which he was the first promoter in Lisbon".
