= James Wood (mathematician) =

English mathematician (1760–1839)

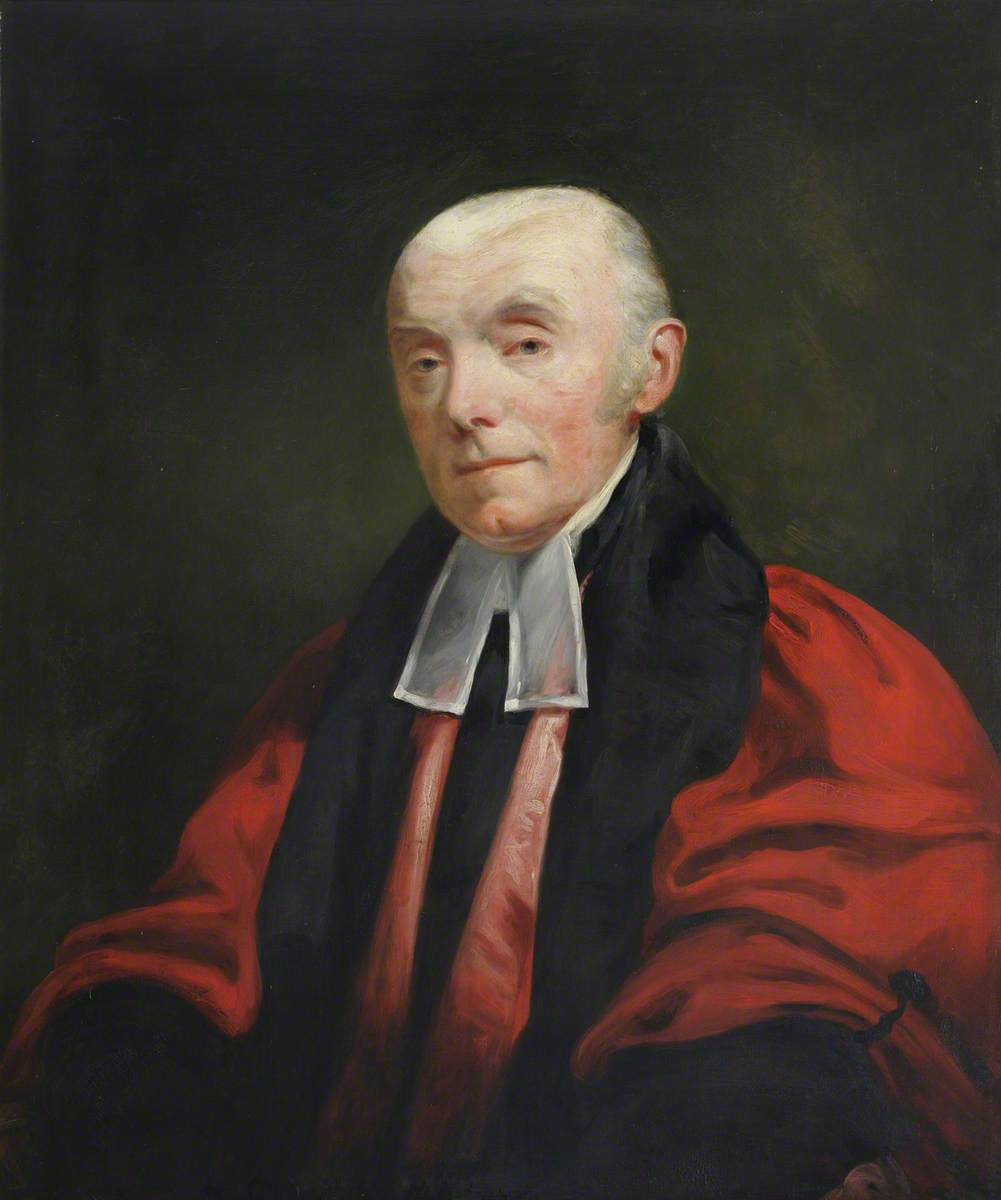
James Wood

James Wood (14 December 1760 – 23 April 1839) was a mathematician, and Master of St John's College, Cambridge. In his later years he was Dean of Ely.

== Life ==
Wood was born in Holcombe, Bury where his father ran an evening school and taught his son the elements of arithmetic and algebra. From Bury Grammar School he proceeded to St John's College, Cambridge in 1778, graduating as senior wrangler in 1782. On graduating he became a fellow of the college and in his long tenure there produced several successful academic textbooks for students of mathematics. Between 1795 and 1799 his The principles of mathematics and natural philosophy, was printed, in four volumes, by J. Burges. Vol.I: 'The elements of algebra', by Wood; Vol.II: 'The principles of fluxions' by Samuel Vince; Vol.III Part I: 'The principles of mechanics" by Wood; and Vol.III Part II: "The principles of hydrostatics" by Samuel Vince; Vol.IV "The principles of astronomy" by Samuel Vince. Three other volumes -"A treatise on plane and spherical trigonometry" and "The elements of the conic sections" by Samuel Vince (1800) and "The elements of optics" by Wood (1801" may have been issued as part of the series.

Wood remained for sixty years at St. John's, serving as both President (1802–1815) and Master (1815–1839); on his death in 1839 he was interred in the college chapel and bequeathed his extensive library to the college, comprising almost 4,500 printed books on classics, history, mathematics, theology and travel, dating from the 17th to the 19th centuries.

Wood was also ordained as a priest in 1787 and served as Dean of Ely from 1820 until his death.

== Publications ==
- The Elements of Algebra (1795)
- The Principles of Mechanics (1796)
- The Elements of Optics (1798)

Church of England titles
Preceded by William Pearce	Dean of Ely; 1820–1839	Succeeded by George Peacock
Academic offices
Preceded by William Craven	Master of St John's College, Cambridge; 1815–1839	Succeeded by Ralph Tatham
