= Charles Ashton (divine) =

English churchman and academic

Charles Ashton (1665 – 1752) was an English churchman and academic, Master of Jesus College, Cambridge from 1701.

== Life ==
Ashton was born on 25 May 1665, at Bradway, in the parish of Norton, Derbyshire. He was admitted to Queens' College, Cambridge, on 18 May 1682, took the degree of B.A., and on 30 April 1687 was elected to a fellowship. After serving for a time as chaplain to Bishop Simon Patrick, he was presented on 10 March 1698–9 to the living of Rattenden in Essex, which he exchanged in the following June for a chaplainship at Chelsea Hospital. On 3 July 1701 he was collated to a prebendal stall in Ely Cathedral, and was elected on the next day to the mastership of Jesus College, Cambridge, both offices being vacant by the death of William Saywell. In the same year he took the degree of D.D., and in 1702 was elected vice-chancellor of the university.

Aston's life was scholarly, and he seldom left Cambridge, except to go to Ely. He died in March 1752, at the age of 87, and was buried in the college chapel.

== Works ==
Ashton's published works are not numerous. He contributed to Joseph Wasse's Bibliotheca Literaria, 1724, an article, "Tully and Hirtius reconciled as to the time of Caesar's going to the African war"; also an emendation of a passage of Justin Martyr. William Reading's editions of Origen's De Oratione (1728) and Historiæ Ecclesiasticæ Scriptores (1746) are said to have been in great part the work of Ashton. According to George Dyer in his History of the University of Cambridge (1814, ii. p. 80), it was Ashton's edition of Hierocles of Alexandria's commentary on The golden verses of Pythagoras that was published as by "R. W." (i.e. Richard Warren).

In 1768 appeared an edition of Justin Martyr's Apologiæ prepared by Frederick Keller, fellow of Jesus College, from papers that Ashton left at his death: all Ashton's manuscripts had been bequeathed to Keller. Among the Cole MSS. in the British Library there are transcripts of some of Ashton's letters to Dean Robert Moss (vol. xxx.); of his additions to John Sherman's History of Jesus College (vol. xlii.); and of his Collections relating to the University. In Edmund Chishull's Antiquitates Asiaticæ (1728), Ashton restored a corrupt inscription to Jupiter Urios.

Ashton's personal papers, including handwritten notes, are held at Jesus College Archives.

== Sources ==
- "Ashton, Charles" . Dictionary of National Biography. London: Smith, Elder & Co. 1885–1900.
