= Taxor =

A Taxor was a representative of the University of Cambridge who exercised the University's rights to intervene in trade in the town of Cambridge, England. One senior and one junior taxor was elected each year, and each had to be an MA of the University. These posts have not been filled since 1856.

== Historical background ==
Since the 13th century the University had special privileges and jurisdiction to control aspects of life in the town. Matters relating to morality and discipline were managed by Proctors and those relating to trade were managed by Taxors, whose responsibilities included:

- Licensing of Alehouses and Lodging-houses
- Fixing the rent of scholar's lodgings and the price of bread
- Examining and sealing weights and measures, confiscating any that were defective
- Administering Stourbridge fair (until 1589)

By the first half of the nineteenth century Benthamite reform had transformed the role of the borough and increasingly the trade and financial privileges of the University caused friction between "town and gown", with the town's deputy High Steward declaring in 1842 that supervision of weights and measures by Taxors was "quite inadequate for the purpose at the present day."

In 1853-4, conflict between the growing jurisdiction of magistrates' courts and the historical duties of the University Proctors was the trigger for a schism between the University and the Borough. The University suggested that the dispute be referred to parliament and Sir John Patteson was appointed as arbitrator to consider their differences. His 1855 report recommended that Proctors should not have to submit to the jurisdiction of magistrates, but called on the University to surrender its rights over trade and licensing. When his proposals were enacted as the Cambridge Award Act 1856, the office of Taxor was discontinued.
