= List of masters of Sidney Sussex College, Cambridge =

The following have served as Master of Sidney Sussex College, Cambridge:

- 1596 James Montagu
- 1608 Francis Aldrich
- 1610 Samuel Ward
- 1643 Richard Minshull
- 1687 Joshua Basset
- 1688 James Johnson
- 1704 Bardsey Fisher
- 1723 Joseph Craven
- 1728 John Frankland
- 1730 John Adams
- 1746 Francis Sawyer Parris
- 1760 William Elliston
- 1807 Francis John Hyde Wollaston
- 1808 Edward Pearson
- 1811 John Davie
- 1813 William Chafy
- 1843 Robert Phelps
- 1890 Charles Smith
- 1918 George Weekes
- 1945 Thomas Knox-Shaw
- 1957 David Thomson
- 1970 John Wilfrid Linnett
- 1975 Donald Henry Northcote
- 1992 Gabriel Horn
- 1999 Sandra Dawson
- 2009 Andrew Wallace-Hadrill
- 2013 Richard Penty
- 2023 Martin Burton
