= David Owen (disambiguation) =

David Owen (born 1938) is a British politician.

David Owen may also refer to:

- David Owen (author) (born 1955), American journalist and author
- David Owen (footballer), English footballer who played for Darwen
- David Owen (harpist) (1712–1741), Welsh harpist ("David of the White Rock")
- David Owen (judge) (1754–1829), Canadian judge and politician in New Brunswick
- David Dale Owen (1807–1860), American geologist
- Dave Owen (baseball) (born 1958), American baseball player
- Dave Owen (Kansas politician) (born 1938), former Lieutenant Governor of Kansas
- David Owen (Virginia politician), Virginia State Legislator
- David Owen (Wisconsin politician) (1828–1893), Wisconsin State Assemblyman
- David Lloyd Owen (1917–2001), British World War II soldier and writer
- David Owen (Dewi Wyn o Eifion) (1784–1841), Welsh poet and farmer
- David Owen (Brutus) (1796–1866), Welsh satirical writer, editor and preacher
- Dave Owen (shot putter), winner of the 1957 NCAA DI outdoor shot put championship
- David Owen (field hockey), British field hockey player

== See also ==
- David Owens (born 1962), officer in the New South Wales Police Force, Australia
- David Owens, character in About Adam
- David ab Owen (died 1512), Welsh abbot and bishop
