= Cantab (magazine) =

Student magazine at the University of Cambridge

- Categories: Student magazine
- Frequency: Fortnightly
- Founded: 1981
- Final issue: 1990
- Based in: Cambridge, Cambridgeshire

Cantab was a magazine produced by students at the University of Cambridge for nearly a decade between 1981 and 1990. It was unusual among British student magazines in being completely independent of student unions. Cantab operations were self-financed, initially through copy sales and advertising, later through advertising alone. The magazine's name, Cantab, is derived from the Latin name for Cambridge and is also short for Cantabrigiensis, the post nominal suffix indicating a degree from the University of Cambridge.

The magazine was relaunched many times but it ultimately ended production in 1990 when its new free distribution model, introduced in 1985, proved to be no longer feasible.

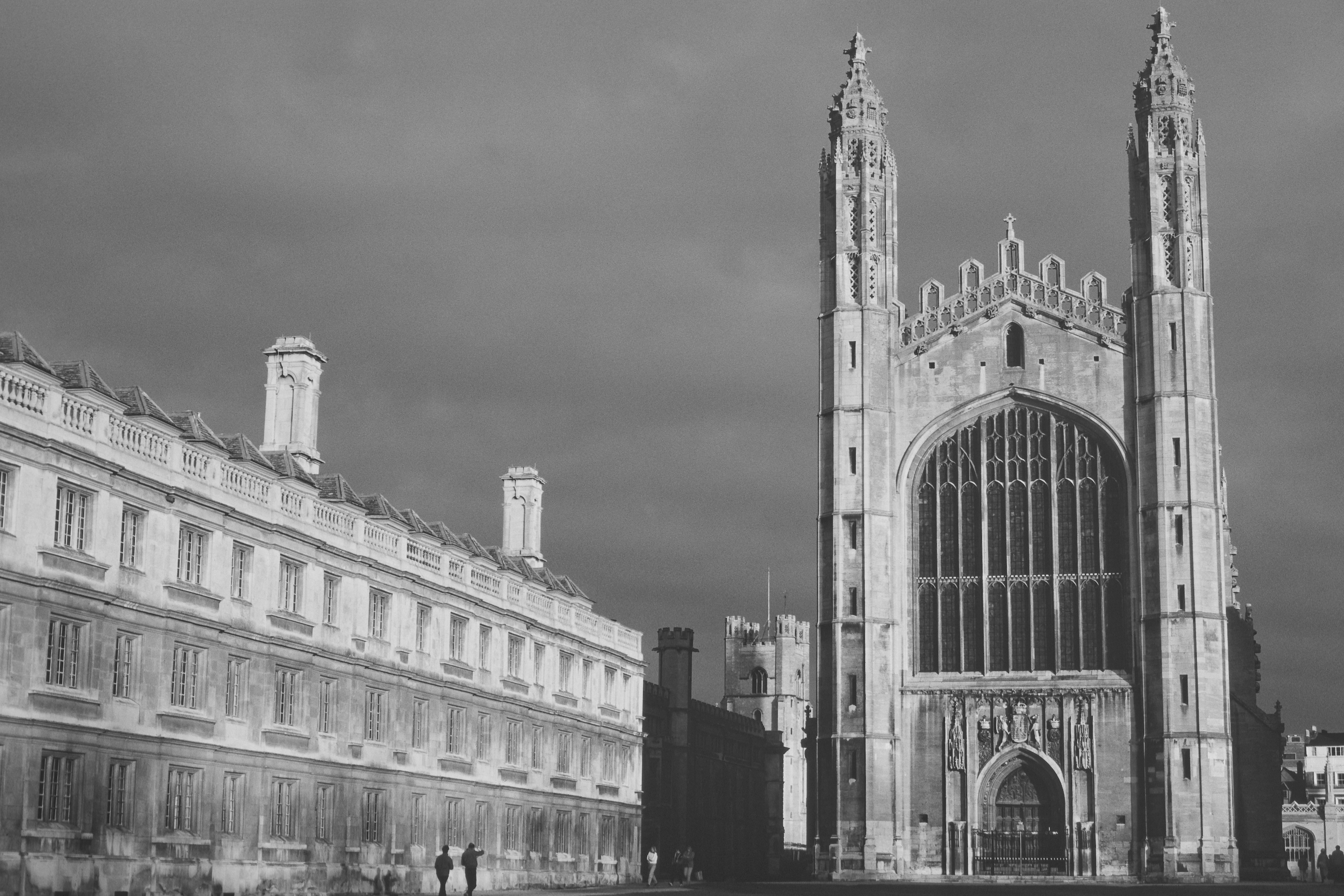
The University of Cambridge (1984)

== History ==
The magazine was launched in 1981 by a group of students at the University of Cambridge who wanted to start a magazine which was completely independent and unaffiliated with the student union. By 1985, the Cambridge magazine continued to grow and had launched a spin-off summer title, Cantab's What's On and Where to Go in Cambridge, which gained success in that year's Student Media Awards, run by The Guardian newspaper. Other less successful spin-offs, including Business Matters and Cantab's version of Energy Matters, were produced occasionally as revenue generating vehicles to subsidize the main title.

The title's second claim to fame was its production via an extremely early form of desktop publishing, involving a typesetting program specially written for its BBC Micro computer and Juki daisy wheel printer by Martin Tod and introduced as early as the first months of 1984.

In 1985/6 the magazine was relaunched, switching from a paid-for circulation to free distribution. Relying solely on advertising sales was an unusual and potentially risky move, but allowed for a massively increased print run, increased pagination and higher production quality. While maintaining a focus on arts coverage, the magazine took an increased interest in politics and current affairs, with a noticeably more left-wing stance.

== Legacy ==
The magazine was relaunched again in 1987/88 but ultimately ended production in 1990 when its business model proved to be no longer feasible. Cantab is often seen as a forerunner to The Tab, a modern-day, multi-national student paper which features students and campuses from across the UK, United States, and Canada.

Cantab alumni include:

- Colin Brown, editor-in-Chief of Screen International, professor at the NYU Film School and contributing editor for CNBC.
- Mike Dash. Fortean, publisher of Viz, featured contributor to Smithsonian and author of Batavia's Graveyard (2001).
- Richard Furlong. Defence barrister specialising in major fraud, money laundering and drugs cartel cases.
- Midge Gillies. Journalist and biographer of Marie Lloyd and Amy Johnson.
- Chris Grayling. Former British Secretary of State for Transport, Leader of the House of Commons and British Secretary of State for Justice. Current Conservative Member of Parliament for Epsom and Ewell.
- Wendy Holden. Best-selling chick lit novelist and ghostwriter for Tara Palmer-Tomkinson and Captain Tom Moore.
- Paul Horrell. Motoring journalist; contributor to Top Gear.
- Andrew Lownie. Literary agent, founder of The Biographers' Club, and biographer of John Buchan, Guy Burgess, and the Duke of Windsor, in his Traitor King (2021).
- David Owens. Professor of Philosophy at King's College London. Author of Shaping the Normative Landscape (2012).
- Richard Penty. Master of Sidney Sussex College and Professor of Photonics at the University of Cambridge.
- Stephen Sackur. Former BBC News Channel correspondent in Washington, D.C.
- Ian Shuttleworth. Theatre critic for the Financial Times; editor and publisher of Theatre Record since 2004.
- Kevin G. Southernwood. Leader of Cambridge city council 1995–98; organiser, Penrith junior chess club, 2015.
- Cathy Troupp. Child and Adolescent Psychotherapist at Great Ormond Street Hospital for Children.
- Tim Turner. Magazine editor and novelist.
- Jo Whelan. Controller General of the Commissioners for the Reduction of the National Debt.
- Marina Wheeler. Barrister specialising in European Union law and former wife of Boris Johnson, Prime Minister of the United Kingdom.

== See also ==
- Cherwell (Oxford)
- The Tab (Cambridge)
- Varsity (Cambridge)
