= Cantab =

Cantab may refer to:

- Cantabrian, a demonym for Canterbury, New Zealand
- Cantabrigian, a demonym for people from:
  - Cambridge, England
    - The University of Cambridge
  - Cambridge, Massachusetts
    - Harvard University
- Cantabrigian Rowing Club (Cantabs), a rowing club in Cambridge, England
- Cantabrigiensis (Cantab.), a postnominal suffix for a degree from Cambridge

== Arts and entertainment ==
- Cantab (magazine), produced by University of Cambridge students from 1981 to 1990
- Roland "The Cantab" Ingestree, a fictional character in World of Wonders (novel)

== Science and technology ==
- Cambridge Neuropsychological Test Automated Battery (CANTAB)
- Jupiter Cantab, a Cambridge-based home computer company
- CANTAB, the codename for the code breaking British Bombe made by the British Tabulating Machine Company
