= Frances Sidney =

Frances Sidney may refer to:

- Frances Sidney, Countess of Sussex (1531–1589)
- Frances Walsingham, married name Frances Sidney (1561–1631)
