= Energy Matters =

British magazine published 1980–1984

- Circulation: defunct
- Founded: 1980
- First issue: November 1980
- Final issue: June 1984
- Country: United Kingdom
- ISSN: 0260-809X

Energy Matters was the title of a magazine published by students at the University of Cambridge between November 1980 and June 1984. Its objective, outlined in the editorial to the first edition, was to provide facts, details and opinions relating to energy, in a way accessible to interested students.

"Energy Matters" was notable in a number ways. Its dispassionate and technical approach to this controversial topic was possibly unprecedented at a British University, at a time when many student publications were highly partisan on the issue. It was an independent undergraduate student magazine wholly funded (initially) by a University department, an unusual and possibly unique arrangement in the UK. It received endorsement from the British Royal Family, a significant and unusual gesture at the time for a magazine dealing with political matters. It was where a number of subsequently famous journalists and academics showed their first public work.

The magazine was founded at a time of high public interest in energy issues, due to the second oil crisis and the Three Mile Island accident the previous year, and to a wave of public interest in energy conservation stimulated by environmental concerns. The topic had become highly political; for example a debate took place in the Cambridge Union Society (the University's debating club) in November 1980 under the title "This House Believes Britain's Dependence on Nuclear Power will Result in Disaster", opposed by Bernard Jenkin.

In this context, the magazine was founded by two undergraduates at the Cambridge University Engineering Department, Richard Davies and Andrew Bud. They secured funding from the Engineering Department which agreed to supply materials and printing services. The first edition ran to 52 pages, and 500 copies were distributed free throughout the University immediately after the Union Society debate. Thanks to the support of one of the Department's professors, Sir William Hawthorne, an expert in energy conservation, the magazine carried an introduction specially provided by Prince Philip, Duke of Edinburgh.

The magazine was well received and a team of volunteer student journalists created the second edition, published in April 1981, catalogued as ISSN 0260-809X. This ran to 100 pages, and the printing of 1000 copies entirely blocked the Engineering Department's reprographic department for three weeks, driving the in-house printer to the edge of despair. Regretfully, the Department withdrew its logistical support.

As a result, commercial sponsorship was sought and successfully raised from the energy industry. Funding came from the oil industry, the electricity and nuclear sectors and several University departments, and the magazine was commercially printed. Under new editors Helen Field and Anne Pudsey-Dawson, the third edition appeared in November 1981.

Although interest in the magazine amongst students beyond the science and engineering faculties was limited, it attracted considerable attention in Whitehall and within the industry. Dozens of copies were requested by these institutions. As a result, the magazine's editors were able to secure interviews with cabinet ministers and heads of the nationalised energy industries and trades unions. As a spin-off, a number of branded seminars were organised at the University, featuring leaders of the energy industry.

The magazine's editorial line was rigorously neutral, and substantial space was given to the thoughts of leading anti-nuclear campaigners, proponents of conservation and evangelists of combined heat and power.

By 1984, the magazine's editor Roger Tredre merged it with the activities of the Cambridge student magazine Cantab, and its main function became to generate advertising revenue to cross-subsidise Cantab. It ceased publication after its seventh edition in summer 1984, its final editors being Richard Penty (now Professor of Photonics at the University of Cambridge) and John Crowther.

Amongst those who worked on the magazine a number subsequently became influential in the fields of journalism or energy policy. The 1983 edition was edited by Vanessa Houlder (currently a leading business journalist on the Financial Times of London), and included contributions from Mike Grubb (now a senior academic working for the Carbon Trust).
