= Andrew Wallace-Hadrill =

British ancient historian, classical archaeologist, and academic

Andrew Wallace-Hadrill OBE FBA FSA
- Born: Andrew Frederic Wallace-Hadrill; 29 July 1951 (age 75); Oxford, Oxfordshire, England

Academic background
- Education: Corpus Christi College, Oxford
- Thesis: Suetonius on the Emperor: Studies in the Representation of the Emperor in the Caesars (1980)

Academic work
- Discipline: Ancient history Classical archaeology
- Institutions: University of Cambridge; Magdalene College, Cambridge; University of Reading; British School at Rome; Sidney Sussex College, Cambridge

Andrew Frederic Wallace-Hadrill, OBE, FBA, FSA (born in Oxford on 29 July 1951) is a British ancient historian, classical archaeologist, and academic. He is Professor of Roman Studies and Director of Research in the Faculty of Classics at the University of Cambridge. He was Director of the British School at Rome between 1995 and 2009, and Master of Sidney Sussex College, Cambridge from August 2009 to July 2013.

== Early life and education ==
Wallace-Hadrill was born on 29 July 1951 in Oxford, England, the son of mediaeval historian John Michael Wallace-Hadrill and Anne Wallace-Hadrill (née Wakefield). He was educated at the private Rugby School. He studied Literae humaniores (i.e. classics) at Corpus Christi College, Oxford, graduating with a Bachelor of Arts (BA) degree: as per tradition, his BA was later promoted to a Master of Arts (MA Oxon) degree. He went on to attain a Doctor of Philosophy (DPhil) degree at St John's College, University of Oxford. His doctoral thesis was titled "Suetonius on the emperor: studies in the representation of the emperor in the Caesars" and was submitted in 1980.

== Academic career ==
Wallace-Hadrill's first academic position was Fellow of Magdalene College, University of Cambridge between 1976 and 1983. He was also the Director of Studies in Classics of the college during that time. He then lectured at the University of Leicester from 1983 till 1987. In 1987, he became Professor of Classics at the University of Reading until 2009. Wallace-Hadrill was Director of the British School at Rome between 1995 and 2009. He was elected the 25th Master of Sidney Sussex College at the University of Cambridge, taking up office in August 2009 on the expiry by statute of Professor Dame Sandra Dawson's tenure. In June 2012, it was announced that he would be standing down from the position of Master to concentrate his efforts on the Herculaneum Conservation Project, which he directed from 2001 to 2016. He stood down in 2013, and continued at Cambridge as Director of Research of the Faculty of Classics from 1 October 2012. He now has the status of emeritus Professor.

In 2004, in an interview on the Australian television programme 60 Minutes, Wallace-Hadrill aired his opinion about the neglect of the archaeological site of Pompeii. He was described as an "angry archaeologist" when he argued that the conservation issues that need to be acted upon urgently at Pompeii are being neglected and that the site is suffering from a "second death". Regarding the deterioration of Pompeii, he contends, "Man is wreaking a damage far greater than Vesuvius. The moment of Pompeii's destruction was also the moment of its preservation. The public needs to understand that unless constant efforts are taken to arrest the decay, the site will, within decades crumble to nothing."

== Television ==
Wallace-Hadrill has made three well-reviewed documentary programmes for BBC television. The Other Pompeii: Life and Death in Herculaneum, first screened in April 2013, was described by The Arts Desk as "a straightforward, lively but informative documentary of substance" on Herculaneum, a Roman city that was destroyed by the eruption of Mount Vesuvius in 79 AD. The two-parter, Building the Ancient City: Athens and Rome, was screened in August 2015, and showed how the building of Athens and Rome paralleled the development of democracy in those two cultures. Daisy Wyatt of The Independent said of it: "An exuberant Wallace-Hadrill made the...documentary watchable thanks to his passion for the subject. It was hard to feel anything but warmth for the antithesis of the typical Oxbridge academic presenter."

== Honours and awards ==
- In 2014, Wallace-Hadrill was awarded an honorary DLitt degree by the University of Reading.
- Fellow of the British Academy (FBA) in 2010
- In the 2004 New Year Honours, Wallace-Hadrill was appointed Officer of the Order of the British Empire "for services to UK–Italian cultural relations".
- Fellow of the Society of Antiquaries (FSA) on 30 April 1998
- Archaeological Institute of America's James R. Wiseman Award in 1995 for his book Houses and Society in Pompeii and Herculaneum (1994)

== Selected works ==
- Suetonius: The Scholar and His Caesars (Duckworth, 1983).
- City and Country in the Ancient World (New York, 1991), ed. with John Rich
- Augustan Rome (1993)
- Houses and Society in Pompeii and Herculaneum (Princeton, 1994).
- Suetonius (Duckworth, 1995).
- Domestic Space in the Roman World: Pompeii and Beyond (1997), ed. with Ray Laurence
- Rome's Cultural Revolution (Cambridge, 2008)
- Herculaneum: Past and Future (Frances Lincoln, 2011).
- The Idea of the City in Late Antiquity (Cambridge University Press 2025)

Academic offices
Preceded by Sandra Dawson	Master of Sidney Sussex College, Cambridge; August 2009 – July 2013	Succeeded by Richard Penty
