= Robert Phelps (academic) =

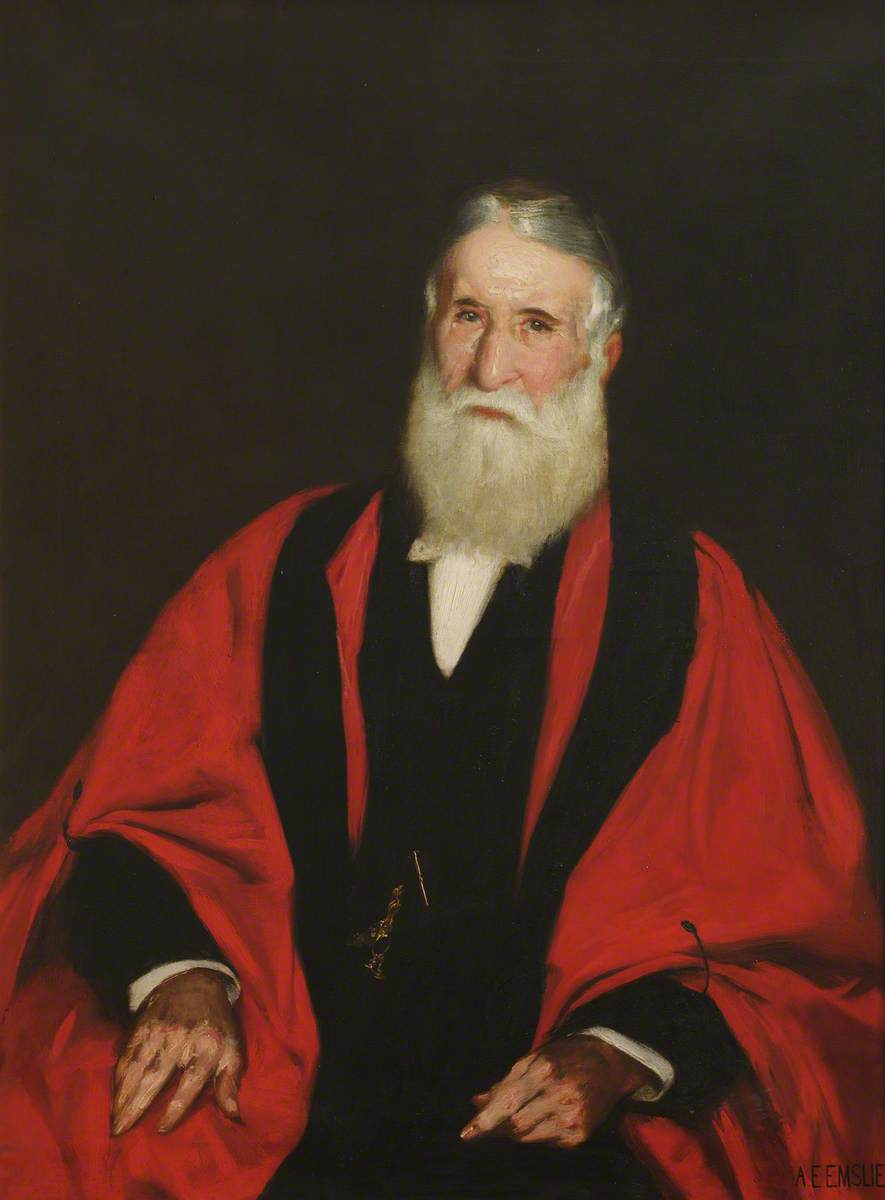
Robert Phelps by Alfred Edward Emslie

Robert Phelps (1808 – 11 January 1890) served as Master of Sidney Sussex College, Cambridge from 1843 until his death.

Phelps was born in 1808 in Devonport, Plymouth, the son of Robert Millar Phelps and the younger brother of the actor Samuel Phelps. Schooled privately, Phelps was admitted to Trinity College, Cambridge on 23 June 1828, gained a scholarship, and graduated B.A. as 5th wrangler 1833, M.A. 1836, B.D. 1843 (at Sidney Sussex College, Cambridge), and honorary D.D. 1843 on the occasion of a visit by Queen Victoria.

Appointed to a fellowship at Sidney Sussex in 1838, Phelps was ordained deacon and priest in 1840. He was elected Master of Sidney Sussex in 1843. From 1848 he was also Rector of Willingham, Cambridgeshire. He was twice vice-chancellor of the University of Cambridge, in 1844–45 and 1847–48. In 1847–48 he served as president of the Cambridge Antiquarian Society.

Alumni Cantabrigienses states that Phelps was "notorious for his conservatism and belief in the old university customs and regulations". As Master of Sidney Sussex, Phelps refused to provide data for the Royal Commission on university property and finances in 1874, preventing the fellows from providing data by appointing himself bursar and removing the accounts to his lodge, writing "insolent replies to the commission's requests for information".

Academic offices
Preceded by William Chafy	Master of Sidney Sussex College, Cambridge; 1843–1890	Succeeded by Charles Smith
