= Thomas Knox-Shaw =

British Army educator

Thomas Knox-Shaw, CBE, MC, (1886 – July 1972) was an English educator. He was Fellow of Sidney Sussex College, Cambridge and master of the college from 1945 to 1957.

== Early life ==
Knox-Shaw was educated at Blundell's School and won a mathematics scholarship to Sidney Sussex College. He obtained Firsts in both parts of the Mathematical Tripos and was fourth Wrangler in 1908. He was elected to the fellowship of the College in 1909.

Knox-Shaw joined the York and Lancaster Regiment at the outbreak of the First World War and served throughout the War both with his regiment and on Brigade staffs, first in France and later in Mesopotamia. He was awarded the Military Cross.

== Career ==
Knox-Shaw was a mathematics tutor at Sidney Sussex College in 1919. He was on the council of the Senate of Cambridge University. In 1929 Knox-Shaw became the second Treasurer of the University. Knox-Shaw made reforms to University accounting and its methods of controlling and maintaining the University's buildings. Knox-Shaw became Master of Sidney Sussex in 1945. Knox-Shaw also served as a member of the Board of Finance of the Diocese of Ely, was a trustee of the Cambridge Mission to Delhi and a very active member on the committee of the Universities' Mission to Central Africa.

Knox-Shaw played a role in the early developments of the National Health Service in the Cambridge area, and in 1954 was appointed a CBE. He retired in 1957. His gifts to the college include the picture of Oliver Cromwell which hangs in the college Hall. Knox-Shaw is commemorated in the Knox-Shaw Room at the college and on one of the Boat Club's racing shells.

Academic offices
| Preceded by George Arthur Weekes | Master of Sidney Sussex College, Cambridge; 1945-1957 | Succeeded by David Thomson |
