= Francis Parris =

British biblical scholar (1707–1760)

Francis Sawyer Parris (1707–1760) was an English biblical scholar. His editorial textual corrections, italicisations, marginal notes, column headings and cross-references played a major part in updating and standardising the 1611 Authorised King James Version of the Bible.

== Life ==
Born 1707 in Bythorn, to Francis and Elizabeth Parris, he was baptised at the parish church on 21 December. He was educated at Sidney Sussex College, Cambridge, graduating B.A. in 1723 and M.A. in 1728, and became a Fellow of his college. He later took holy orders, and was awarded the degrees of B.D. in 1735 and D.D. in 1747. He was appointed Master of Sidney Sussex in 1746, and University Librarian, both which positions he retained until his early death on 1 May 1760.

== Editor of the King James Version of the Holy Bible ==
Since 1698, the University Press at Cambridge has been managed by eighteen "Syndics." From the mid-1730s, the Syndics's stated ambition was to "serve the Public with a more beautiful and correct Edition [of the Bible] than can easily be found." When the first "Inspector of the Press" Cornelius Crownfield retired in 1740, he was succeeded by Joseph Bentham, as the University's Inspector of the Press (28 March 1740) and Printer to the University (14 December 1740). At the same time, the Syndics invited Parris to check and proofread the text of the Bibles that Bentham would produce.

Parris's first edition of the Bible was published by Bentham in 1743. At first, the changes Parris made were minor, but not insignificant. For example, his 1743 edition (and all subsequent editions) removed the comma that in the 1611 edition appears after "God" in the phrase "and the glorious appearing of the great God and our Saviour Jesus Christ" (Titus 2:13); so emphasising the co-equality of God and our Saviour in orthodox Trinitarianism. This edition was reprinted in 1747 and 1752, but Parris made substantial further alterations for the prolonged 1756-58 edition. Parris's revision of the text culminated a little before his death in the 1760 octavo edition. This was reprinted without further changes in a 1762 folio edition, printed by Joseph Bentham, and the celebrated John Baskerville folio edition of 1763. In 1769, Benjamin Blayney produced an edition in Oxford with few changes from Parris's 1760 edition. The 1769 Oxford edition remains the principal template for modern editions of the KJV Bible.
