= Seyi Akiwowo =

British activist

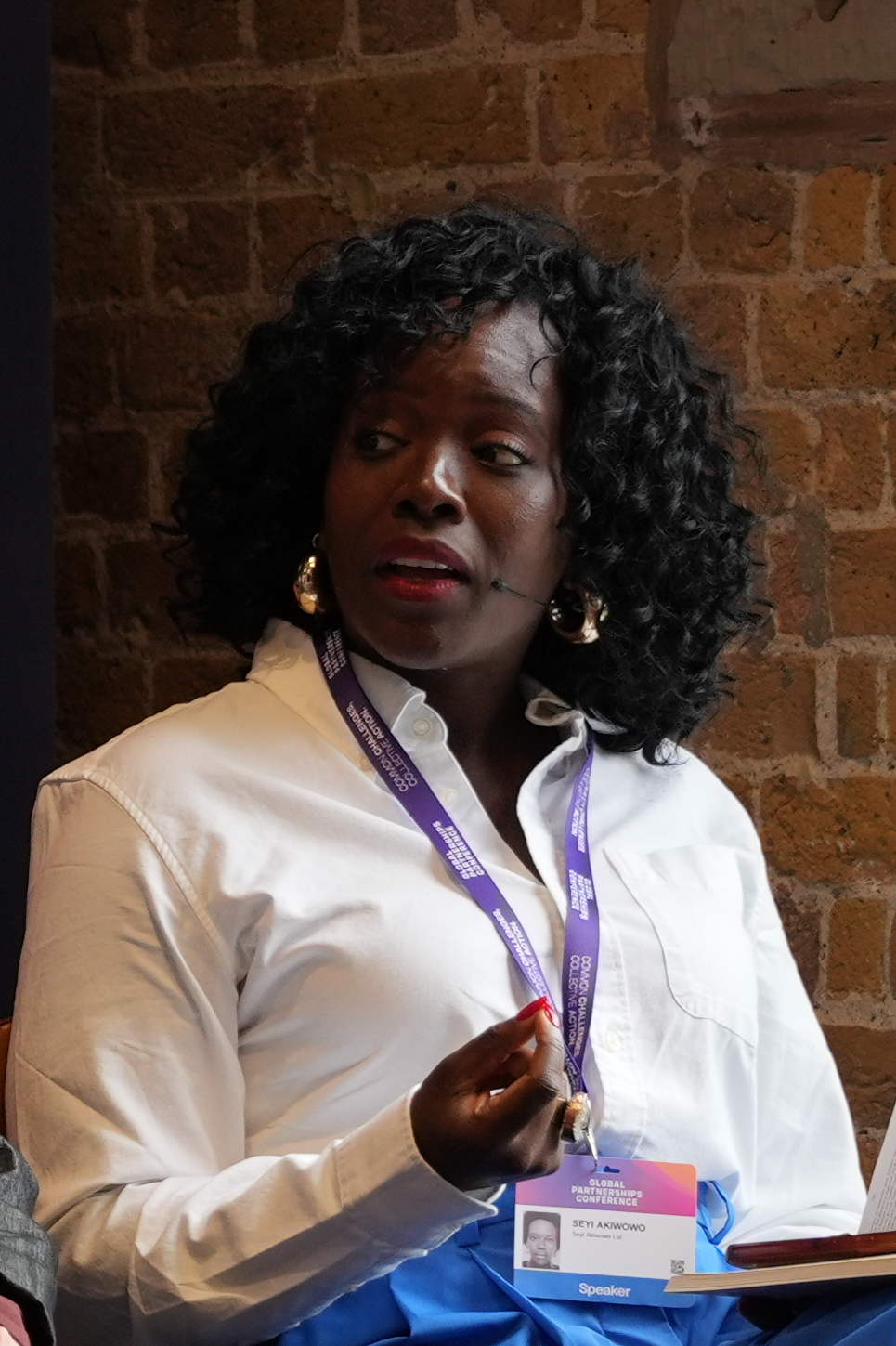
- Akiwowo in 2026
- Education: Sir George Monoux College; London School of Economics
- Employer(s): Glitch; European Youth Forum; Teach First; UK Youth Parliament
- Website: www.seyiakiwowo.com

Seyi Akiwowo (Shay-ee Aki-wo-wo) is a British-Nigerian women's rights activist and campaigner. Akiwowo is a leader and former local politician. She was the founder and CEO of Glitch, a UK-based charity established in 2020 to address online abuse.

Akiwowo experienced online abuse following a speech at the European Parliament, which led her to launch the #FixTheGlitch campaign in 2017. The campaign developed into Glitch, which focuses on digital safety, particularly against women and marginalized communities. She was CEO of the organisation until 2025.

Her work has contributed to policy discussions on online harms, including debates around the UK’s Online Safety Act. She is the author of How to Stay Safe Online. She was selected as the Amnesty International Human Rights Defender in 2018 and the Digital Leader of the Year in 2019. She is one of the Evening Standard 2019 list of most influential people and appeared in Marie Claire in September 2019 as a Future Shaper.

== Early life and education ==
Akiwowo grew up in the London Borough of Newham. She attended Sir George Monoux College, where she completed A-Levels in law, history, government and politics. Whilst at college Akiwowo successfully campaigned for a position in the Newham Youth Council. In this capacity she attended the UK Youth Parliament, where she campaigned to improve sexual health policy. She studied at the London School of Economics, where she earned a Bachelor's degree in social policy. Her dissertation considered whether the right questions were being asked about academy education trusts.

== Research and career ==
After graduating, Akiwowo was an intern at the House of Commons and the European Youth Forum. In 2014, at the age of 23, Akiwowo was the youngest black woman to be elected as a councillor for the Labour Party in East London. She believes that involvement with local politics is important to mitigate the rise of the alt-right. She also believes in equal access to education and training for all young people. She is a senior project coordinator for Teach First. She was also a founding associate of Spark+Mettle, a charity which supports young people in the development of their resilience and soft skills using technology and coaching.

Akiwowo delivered a speech at the European Parliament about how countries such as Britain, France and Italy should deal with the impact of colonialism. Her speech was met with boos by the audience in the room, to which she responded, "You can boo me all you like, baby". After a video of her speech went viral online, Akiwowo was subject to racist abuse on Twitter. The tweets were reported to Twitter over 75 times, as well as to the Metropolitan Police. Initially the social media platforms failed to respond to her complains, but suspended some of the particularly racist accounts after Akiwowo went public with her story. In an Amnesty International – Ipsos MORI poll, one fifth of women said they had suffered harassment on social media.

Akiwowo designed the Fix the Glitch, a toolkit which supports organisations in how to end gender-based violence. The workshops have three pillars; awareness, advocacy and action. She believes that women need to reclaim their digital space and "assert their presence". Akiwowo does not want to restrict peoples rights or freedom of speech; but protect people from online trolls who can hide behind anonymity. She established Glitch, a platform and advice provider that helps young people stay protected online. Her campaign has been supported by Amnesty International. Glitch is supported by a Fairer Tech grant from Dot Everyone. Akiwowo was one of the founders of the #ToxicTwitter campaign, which looks to end the online abuse of women. She has written for Gender IT, a collection of feminist reflections on internet policies. She delivered a TEDx London talk on how to "fix the glitch" in online communities in 2019.

=== Recognition and honours ===
In 2018 Akiwowo was selected as the Amnesty International Human Rights Defender and as a Stylist Woman of the Week. She was featured in Yomi Adegoke's book Slay in Your Lane, as well as on the podcast Busy Being Black. In June 2019 Akiwowo was awarded Digital Leader of the Year. She has written for HuffPost and The Guardian.

In 2019 Akiwowo was chosen as one of Marie Clare's Future Shapers; trailblazers who are working hard to make the world a happier, safer and better place for women. In October 2019 Akiwowo was listed in the Evening Standard as one of London's most influential people in the social media stars category.
