= Sandra Dawson (academic) =

British social scientist and academic

Dame Sandra June Noble Dawson, DBE, FAcSS (born 4 June 1946) is a British social scientist and academic. She was Master of Sidney Sussex College, Cambridge from 1999 to 2009, making her the first woman to be master of a formerly all-male college at the University of Cambridge. She was the inaugural KPMG Professor of Management Studies at the Cambridge Judge Business School. She holds a BA degree in sociology and history from Keele University.

== Academic career ==
Dawson was also Director of the Judge Business School, University of Cambridge, from 1995 to 2006, and one of the deputy vice chancellors of the University of Cambridge between 2008 and 2012. Prior to this, Dawson was Professor of Organisational Behaviour within the National Health Service (1990–1995) and Deputy Director of the Management School (1987–1994) at Imperial College London.

== Other work ==
In 2010, the Chancellor of the Exchequer, Alistair Darling, appointed her as a non-executive director at the United Kingdom's Financial Services Authority, following her previous role on the board of directors at Barclays and Chase banks. She is also a trustee of Oxfam.

Alongside Katy Steward, Dawson co-authored an Expert Witness report on Corporate Governance of Post Office Limited, as part of the Horizon IT Inquiry chaired by Sir Wyn Williams.

== Honours ==
Dawson was created a Dame Commander of the Order of the British Empire (DBE) in 2004.

Academic offices
Preceded by Gabriel Horn	Master of Sidney Sussex College, Cambridge; 1999–2009	Succeeded by Andrew Wallace-Hadrill
