= Don Northcote =

- Born: 27 December 1921
- Died: 7 January 2004 (aged 82)
- Education: University of London
- Awards: fellow of the Royal Society,
- Scientific career
- Fields: Chemistry

Donald Henry Northcote, FRS (27 December 1921 – 7 January 2004) was a 20th-century British academic.

== Early life ==
Northcote was educated at Sir George Monoux Grammar School (1933–38). He graduated from University of London.

== Career ==
He was a Lecturer in Plant Biochemistry at the University of Cambridge; then Reader from 1965 to 1972; and Professor from 1972 to 1989. He was also an Honorary Fellow of Downing College, Cambridge.

== Personal life ==
His daughter Jane married 21-year-old Tim Berners-Lee at Cambridge Register Office in July 1976. Both had graduated, together, in Physics. Both would work as engineers in Poole in Dorset, at Plessey. She had attended Perse School for Girls. The reception was at Sidney Sussex College, with a holiday in southern Ireland. They lived in Corfe Mullen.

Academic offices
Preceded by John Wilfrid Linnett	Master of Sidney Sussex College, Cambridge; 1975–1992	Succeeded by Gabriel Horn
