= Gabriel Horn =

British biologist

Professor Sir Gabriel Horn FRS FRCP
- Born: 9 December 1927
- Died: 2 August 2012 (aged 84); Cambridge, England, United Kingdom
- Awards: Royal Medal (2001)
- Scientific career
- Fields: Neuroscience
- Workplaces: University of Bristol; University of Cambridge

Sir Gabriel Horn (9 December 1927 – 2 August 2012) was a British neuroscientist and Professor of Zoology at the University of Cambridge. His research was into the neural mechanisms of learning and memory.

== Early life ==
Horn was born on 9 December 1927. He attended Handsworth Technical School in Handsworth, Birmingham. He left the school at 16 to work in his parents' shop and studied part-time for a National Certificate in Mechanical Engineering, achieving distinction. He served in the Royal Air Force before studying for a Bachelor of Medicine, Bachelor of Surgery at the University of Birmingham.

== Academic career ==
Horn's first academic position was in 1956 at the Department of Anatomy, University of Cambridge as a Demonstrator in Anatomy. He became a Lecturer and then a Reader, before leaving to become Professor of Anatomy at the University of Bristol in 1974. In 1975, while at Bristol, he obtained his DSc degree.

In 1977, he returned to Cambridge to head the Department of Zoology. He retired in 1995 and was made emeritus professor. He was Master of Sidney Sussex College, Cambridge from 1992 to 1999 and Deputy Vice-Chancellor of the university from 1994 to 1997.

He remained a fellow of Sidney Sussex College after 1999 until his death; he had earlier been a fellow of King's College, Cambridge, and was elected a life fellow there in 1999.

== Honours ==
He was elected a Fellow of the Royal Society in 1986, receiving their Royal Medal in 2001. He was given an Honorary Doctor of Science degree by the University of Birmingham in 1999 and by the University of Bristol in 2003. He was knighted in the 2002 New Year Honours "for services to Neurobiology and to the Advancement of Scientific Research".

Academic offices
Preceded by Donald Henry Northcote	Master of Sidney Sussex College, Cambridge; 1992-1999	Succeeded by Sandra Dawson
