= Sir George Monoux College =

Coordinates: 51.5953°N 0.0148°W

Sir George Monoux Sixth Form College

Location
- Chingford Road; London, E17 5AA; England

Information
- Type: Sixth Form College
- Established: 1527 – original institution 1986 – current sixth form college
- Local authority: Waltham Forest
- Department for Education URN: 130458 Tables
- Ofsted: Reports
- Principal: David Vasse
- Enrollment: 1,680 (2018)
- Website: www.sgmc.ac.uk

Sir George Monoux College is a sixth form college located in Walthamstow, London. It is a medium-sized college with around 1,620 full-time students as of 2018.

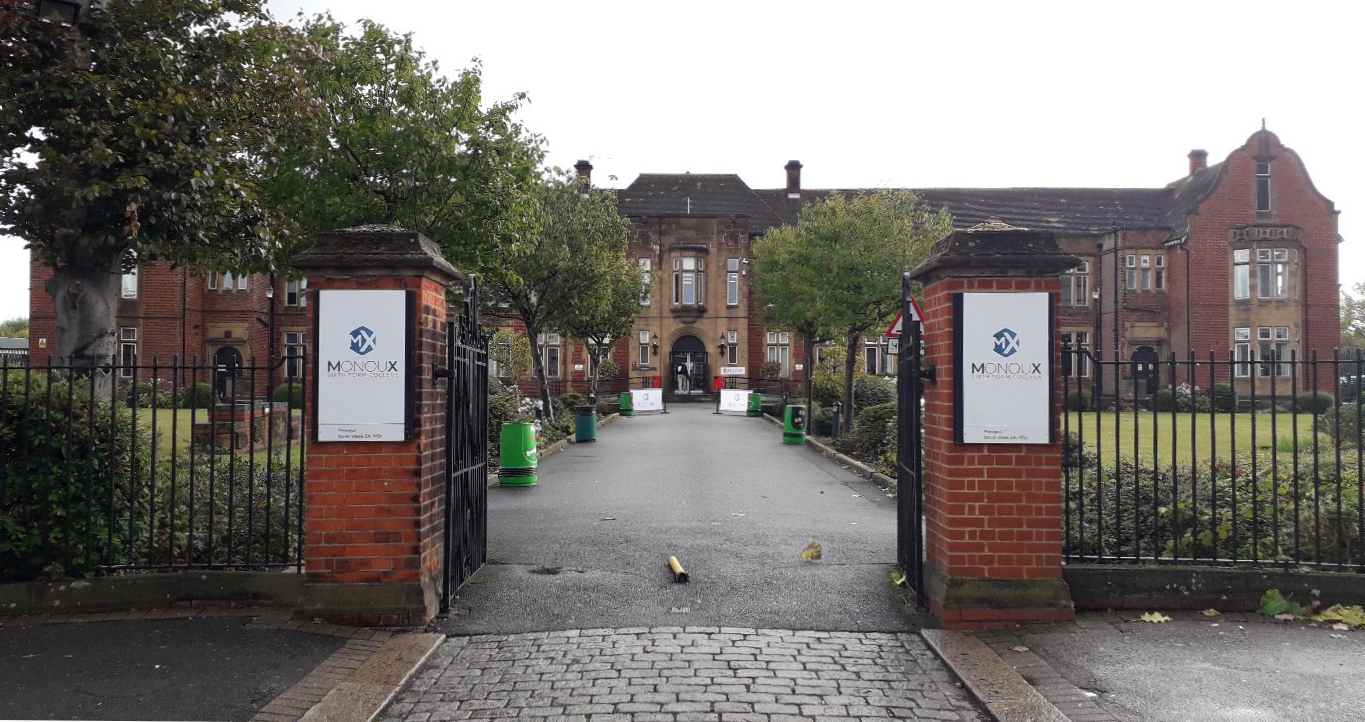
Sir George Monoux Sixth Form College, Chingford Road, London, 2019

== Brief history ==
Sir George Monoux, the founder of the Grammar School (later College), was born in or before 1465. In 1506 he was a Warden of the Drapers Company, in 1509 he became the Sheriff of London and later in 1514 he became Lord Mayor. He was elected to Parliament as a Burgess for the City in 1523.

He was a wealthy man who spent much of his time in Walthamstow. He erected the Almshouses, associated school and feast ball for the poor of Walthamstow on a former parcel of St. Mary's Churchyard in 1527 in Walthamstow Village. The Monoux School operated there for 353 years until moving firstly to West Avenue then to High Street, and finally to Chingford Road in 1927. The western end was rebuilt in 1955 following bombing in October 1940.

From 1659 to 1968, the institution operated as a grammar school for boys. From 1968 to 1986 the school was a comprehensive while in 1986 the school became a sixth form college and girls were admitted for the first time. Following the 1992 Further and Higher Education Act, in 1993, Monoux became an Incorporated College, which it remains today.

== Sir George Monoux Grammar School 1885-1968 ==
The school was re-established following a scheme made under the Endowed Schools Act in 1885 in temporary premises in West Avenue, a different part of Walthamstow, and then a purpose-built site in High Street. It moved to the present premises in July 1927. There have been additions to the buildings in 1961, 1977, 1990, 2002 and 2004.

The school remained independent, but came to depend increasingly on local authority grants. Following the death of the then headmaster, William Spivey, in 1916, it can be regarded as effectively a selective boys local authority grammar school until 1968 catering 11 to 18 year olds.

The school was evacuated to Ampthill in Bedfordshire in September 1939, then to the Colchester Royal Grammar School on Friday 17 November 1939.

== Sir George Monoux Senior School 1969-1985 ==
Following reorganisation of secondary education by Waltham Forest council (devised by a Labour council but instituted under a Conservative one), during the years 1968 - 72 it gradually became a comprehensive Senior High School for boys aged 14–18 admitting most of its pupils from the Junior High Schools Chapel End, William Fitt and Warwick Boys School. The last entry of boys to the main Monoux building was in 1987 who were taught separately to the sixth form but within the same building in Chingford Road. The last entry of boys however was in 1988 who were not taught in the main building but in an "annexe" located in Brookscroft Rd in the old Chapel End Junior High School. This was closed in 1990.

== Sir George Monoux Sixth Form College 1986- ==
Following the London Borough of Waltham Forest's re-organisation of post-16 studies, in 1986 the school became a co educational sixth form college for students aged 16–19 and fully co-educational from 1989. It was funded and administered by the borough from 1986 to 1993 when under the provisions of the Further and Higher Education Act 1992 it was incorporated, becoming in effect an independent body funded by the newly formed Further Education Funding Council for England (FEFC).

In 2001 the FEFC was replaced with the Learning and Skills Council (LSC). The college driven by government growth targets increased in size from 600 students in 1986 to approximately 2000 students in 2006. The college offers A-level and vocational courses. The college draws students from a wide geographical area of north and east London and from a very wide range of cultural and ethnic backgrounds. At present over 95% of the students are from minority ethnic communities.

In 2026 the college had a consultation proposing that it should convert into an academy in near future.

=== The Principals ===
Since 1986 the Principals of the college have been:

- Mrs Corine Moffett 1986–1993
- Arthur Harvey 1993–1996
- Stephen Grix 1996–2000
- John McMinn, Acting Principal April–September 2000
- Richard Chambers 2000–2006
- John McMinn, Acting Principal November–March 2006
- Kim Clifford 2006–2010
- Paolo Ramella 2010–2015
- David Ball, Acting Principal September 2015- August 2016
- David Vasse 2016 - current

== Notable former students ==
=== Sir George Monoux College ===
- Gabrielle Brooks, actress
- Michaela Coel, actress
- Regé-Jean Page, actor
- June Sarpong, TV presenter
- Faiza Shaheen, economist
- CJ Ujah, athlete

=== Sir George Monoux Senior High School ===
- Teddy Sheringham, former star of Manchester United and Tottenham Hotspur Football Club, attended Monoux in the 1970s, leaving in 1982.
- Brian Harvey from the pop band East 17 attended until 1990.
- Seyi Akiwowo, political and social activist

=== Sir George Monoux Grammar School ===
- Robert Barltrop, prolific local writer, attended Monoux from 1933 to 1938
- Prof George Barnard, Professor of Mathematics at the University of Essex from 1966 to 1975, and President of the Royal Statistical Society from 1971 to 1972, the Operational Research Society from 1962 to 1964 and the Institute of Mathematics and its Applications from 1970 to 1971
- Edward Lyon Berthon marine inventor, who attended the original school, c1830
- Sir Reader Bullard, diplomat
- Gary Carpenter (composer) attended Monoux 1962 to 1969.
- Sir Jack Cater CBE, Chief Secretary of Hong Kong from 1978 to 1981
- Thomas George Cowling, Professor of Applied Mathematics at the University of Leeds from 1948 to 1970, and President of the Royal Astronomical Society from 1965 to 1967
- Sir John Dankworth, jazz musician, attended Monoux from 1937 to 1944
- Sir John Elvidge, Permanent Secretary to the Scottish Executive 2003–2010
- Prof Sir Alan Fersht, Herchel Smith Professor of Organic Chemistry at the University of Cambridge, elected in 2012 to become the Master of Gonville and Caius College, Cambridge.
- John Garrett, Labour MP for Norwich South from 1974 to 1983 and 1987–97
- Professor Norman Gowar Professor of Mathematics at the Open University and Principal of Royal Holloway College, University of London
- John Horner, Labour MP for Oldbury and Halesowen from 1964 to 1970
- James Hilton, novelist, at school 1909–15
- Doug Insole, who played for England's cricket team, attended Monoux from 1937 to 1944
- Sir Barry Jackson, surgeon, and President of the Royal Society of Medicine from 2002 to 2004, the Royal College of Surgeons of England from 1998 to 2001, and of the British Academy of Forensic Science from 2005 to 2007
- Jim Lewis, footballer
- Prof Donald Northcote, Professor of Plant Biochemistry at the University of Cambridge from 1972 to 1989, who first discovered the preprophase band in 1966
- Michael Nyman, composer and musicologist
- Dr Christopher Page, writer on medieval music
- Norman Pannell, Conservative MP for Liverpool Kirkdale from 1955 to 1964
- Chris Pond (born 1949), from 1961 to 1969, founding head of the House of Commons Information Office, author and historian, wrote the history of the school in 1977 and updated it in 2002
- Sir Fred Pontin, founder and managing director of Pontins holiday camps, attended Monoux between 1918 and 1922
- Sir John Pritchard CBE, conductor, Chief conductor of the BBC Symphony Orchestra from 1982 to 1989
- Barry Rose OBE, conductor and organist of Guildford Cathedral from 1960 to 1974
- Air Vice-Marshal Roy Scoggins CBE, Director of RAF Dental Services from 1958 to 1964
- Jamie Shea, NATO spokesman, much in the news during the Kosovo crisis, attended Monoux from 1965 to 1972
- Frederick Silvester, Conservative MP for Walthamstow West from 1967 to 1970 and Manchester Withington from 1974 to 1987
- John Smith, is an avant–garde filmmaker noted for his use of humour, attended Monoux from 1963 to 1968
- David Thomson, historian
- Matthew Bourne choreographer, 1974-1978
- Prof Herman Waldmann, Professor of Pathology at the University of Oxford since 1994
