= Bardsey Fisher =

British academic

Bardsey Fisher (b Nottingham 17 February 1658 – d Cambridge 18 February 1723) was an 18th-century academic.

Fisher graduated B.A. from Sidney Sussex College, Cambridge in 1678, and M.A. in 1681. He was ordained in 1682 and held livings in Newmarket, Stowmarket and Withersfield. He was Master of Sidney Sussex from 1704 until his death; and Vice Chancellor of the University of Cambridge from 1705 to 1706.
