= David Thomson (historian) =

David Thomson (13 January 1912 – 24 February 1970) was an English historian who wrote several books about British and European history.

== Education ==
Thomson was born in Edinburgh, the son of a printer. He was educated at Sir George Monoux Grammar School, Walthamstow, and was then a Scholar of Sidney Sussex College, Cambridge, from 1931 to 1934. where he took first-class honours with distinction in both parts of the Historical Tripos. He had a long association with the college and was subsequently a Research Fellow, a Fellow and finally Master.

== Career ==
He worked as a university lecturer in history and was a visiting professor at Columbia University in New York. His works included Europe Since Napoleon (Longmans, 1957); World History from 1914 to 1961 (1963); Democracy in France since 1870 (1964) and two volumes of the Pelican History of England, which covered the 19th and the 20th centuries.

== Approach ==
In his preface to the Pelican edition (1966) of Europe Since Napoleon, Thomson wrote that he had attempted to present "the history of the last 150 years of European civilisation in a new way". He doubted the "conventional belief" that countries must be treated separately except when their delegates convene for a conference. He held that "tendencies which transcend several nations at once have a rather special historical importance". He argued that this approach would ensure a cohesion and coherence that "seem appropriate in our postwar experience".

Again using Europe Since Napoleon as an example, whose scope is Europe since 1815, Thomson points out a "necessary prologue" with four main phases since the beginning of the French Revolution in 1789. He listed the phases as "Revolution, War, Dictatorship, Empire" and sets out to show how each gave place to the next and how profound and permanent was their cumulative impact on later generations. Beginning with the situation in France in 1789, Thomson wrote of the paradox that no significant group wanted revolution, but it happened because of the other things that they wanted. Much had been made by previous historians of an assumed "revolutionary spirit" abroad in France that had been generated by philosophes such as Voltaire and Jean-Jacques Rousseau. Thomson argued that a connection between their ideas and the revolution was remote and indirect. They did not preach revolution and were happy to be patronised by any aristocrat so willing. It was only later that their ideas and doctrines were used to justify revolutionary events. Instead, Thomson argued, what mattered in 1789 was a "revolutionary situation" that turned people into revolutionaries in spite of themselves. The philosophes played no part in the creation of this situation which came about essentially because the King, and thereby the entire French State, was in dire financial straits. The state of the economy, not philosophical belief, caused the French Revolution.

== Bibliography ==
- Personality and politics
- The Democratic ideal in France and England (1940)
- England in the 19th Century 1815-1914 (1951) online
- Personality and politics
- The Democratic ideal in France and England
- England in the 20th Century 1914-1963 (1965)
- Europe Since Napoleon (Longmans, 1957)

Academic offices
Preceded by Thomas Knox-Shaw	Master of Sidney Sussex College, Cambridge; 1957-1970	Succeeded by John Wilfrid Linnett
