= David Owen (footballer) =

English footballer

Personal information
- Place of birth: England
- Position: Half back

Senior career*
Years	Team	Apps	(Gls)
1891–1894	Darwen	25	(0)
- * Club domestic league appearances and goals

David Owen was an English footballer who played in the Football League for Darwen.
