= William Chafy =

English cleric and college head

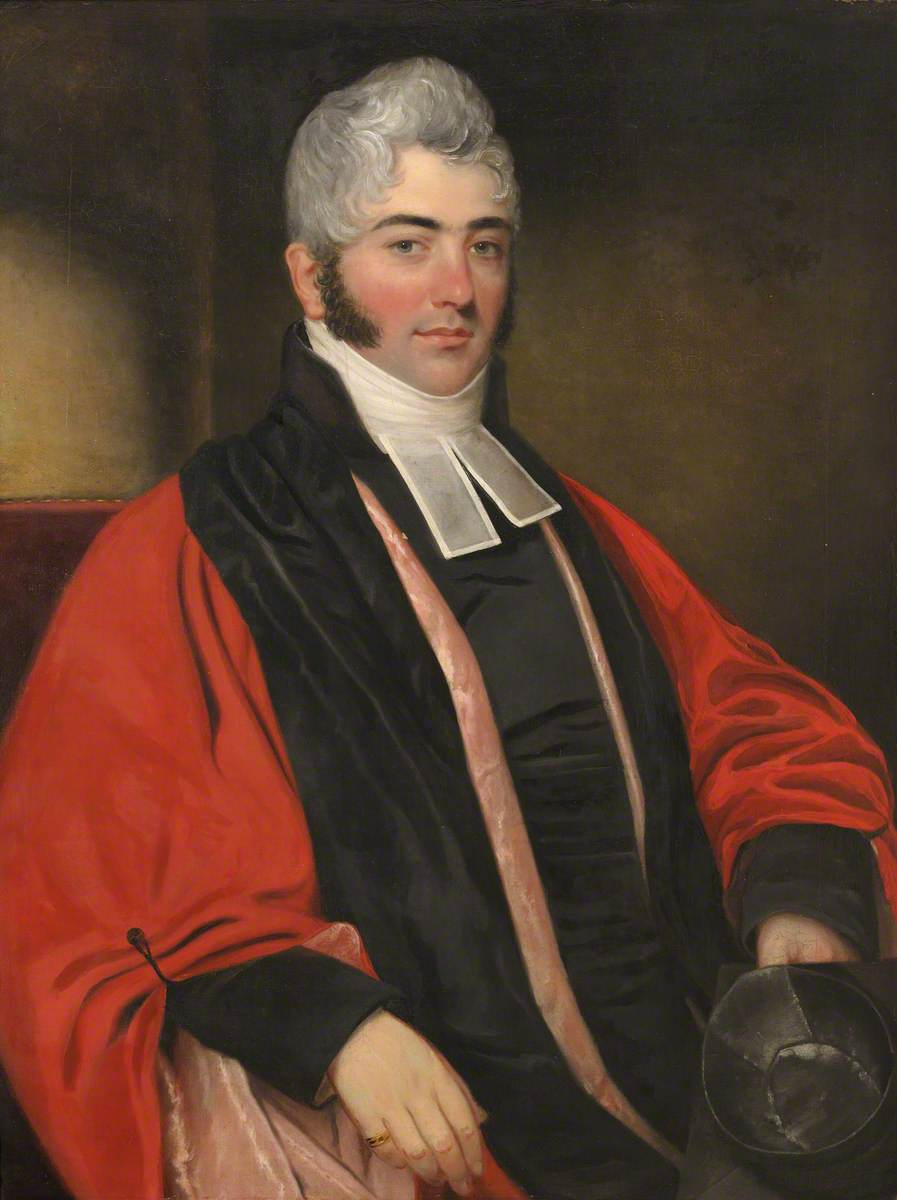
William Chafy

William Chafy (7 February 1779 – 16 May 1843) served as Master of Sidney Sussex College, Cambridge from 1813 until his death.

Chafy was the eldest son of William Chafy, minor canon of Canterbury Cathedral, by Mary, the only daughter of John Chafie of Sherborne, Dorsetshire. He was born on 7 February 1779 in Canterbury, and educated at The King's School, Canterbury. He entered Corpus Christi College, Cambridge, on 1 January 1796, migrating to Sidney Sussex College, Cambridge on 18 October of the same year. He graduated B.A. 1800, M.A. 1803, B.D. 1810, D.D. (by royal mandate) 15 Nov. 1813.

He was elected fellow of Sidney Sussex on 4 June 1801, was ordained deacon in 1801 and priest in 1803. He also became curate of Gillingham, Kent in 1801. On 17 October 1813 he was elected master of Sidney Sussex, and held that office until his death. During his mastership the college was refaced at his expense; many of his books were also presented by him to the college library. In 1813, and again in 1829, he was vice-chancellor of the university. He was also chaplain in ordinary to George III, George IV, William IV, and Queen Victoria. He died at Cambridge 16 May 1843, and was buried in the chapel of his college.

Dr. Chafy married, on 4 December 1813, Mary, youngest daughter of John Westwood of Chatteris in the Isle of Ely, by whom he had one child, a son, William Westwood Chafy.

Academic offices
Preceded by John Davie	Master of Sidney Sussex College, Cambridge; 1813–1843	Succeeded by Robert Phelps
