= Frances Sidney, Countess of Sussex =

16th-century English noblewoman

Lady Frances Sidney
- Countess of Sussex
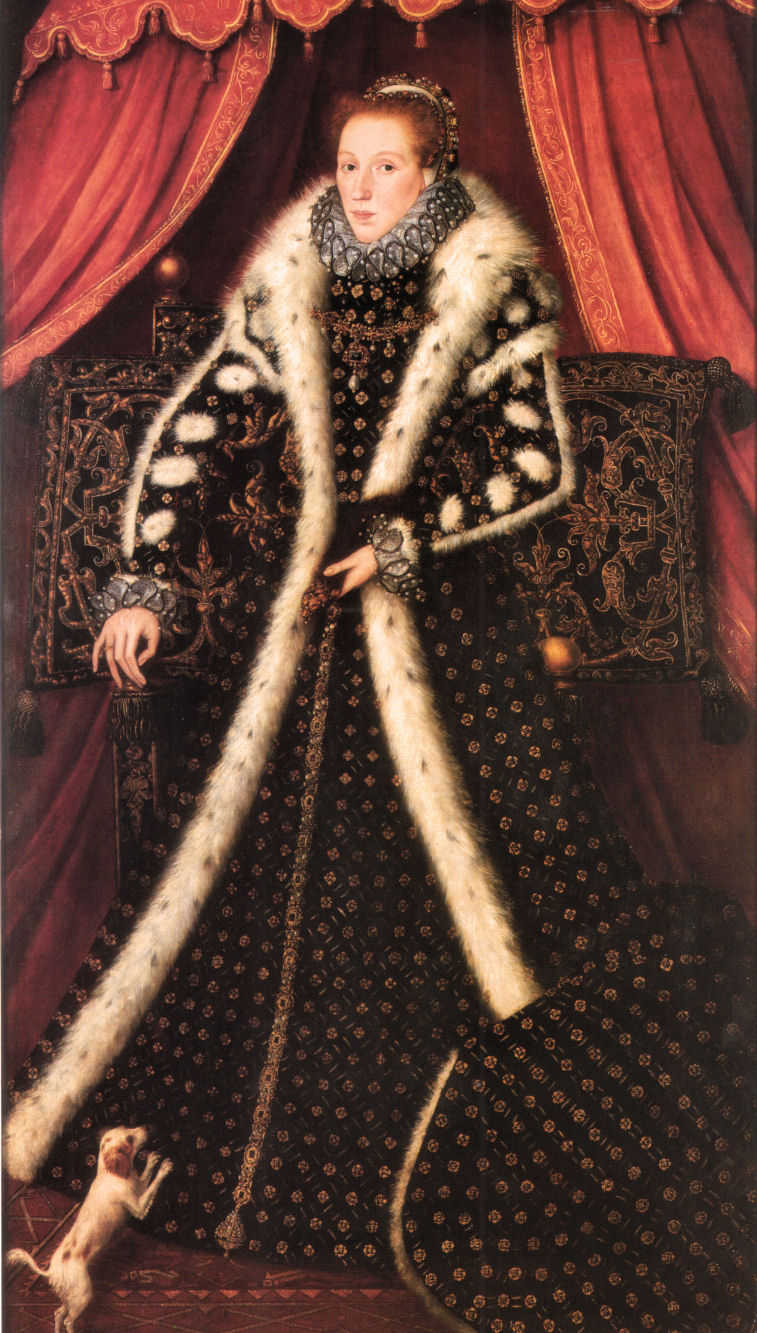
- The Countess of Sussex c. 1570-75, this painting hangs in the hall of Sidney Sussex College
- Tenure: 1557-1589
- Known for: Foundress of Sidney Sussex College, Cambridge
- Born: 1531; Penshurst Place
- Died: 9 March 1589 (aged 57–58); Bermondsey
- Residence: Kilmainham Priory, Ireland; Bermondsey
- Spouse: Thomas Radclyffe, 3rd Earl of Sussex
- Parents: Sir William Sidney and Anne Pagenham

Frances Radclyffe, Countess of Sussex (née Sidney; 1531–1589) was a Lady of the Bedchamber to Queen Elizabeth I and the founder of Sidney Sussex College, Cambridge. She was the daughter of Sir William Sidney, of Penshurst Place in Kent, a prominent courtier during the reign of King Henry VIII, and his wife, the former Anne Packenham. She was the sister of Sir Henry Sidney, and aunt to both the poet Sir Philip Sidney and the first Sidney Earl of Leicester.

In 1555, she married (as his second wife) Thomas Radclyffe, Viscount FitzWalter, who was appointed Lord Deputy of Ireland in April 1556, and who succeeded his father as 3rd Earl of Sussex in 1557. They left no children.

In her will, Lady Sussex left the sum of £5,000 together with some plate to found a new college at Cambridge University 'to be called the Lady Frances Sidney Sussex College'. Her executors, Sir John Harington and Henry Grey, 6th Earl of Kent, supervised by Archbishop John Whitgift, founded the college seven years after her death.

Her arms are used by Sidney Sussex College, Cambridge, and a mascot of the college is a blue and gold porcupine, taken from a crest of the Sidney family.

== Early life ==
Frances Sidney was born in or around 1531 at Penshurst Palace in Kent to Sir William Sidney and Anne Pagenham. She was their fourth and youngest daughter and thus had a number of siblings including Mary Margaret Sidney, Lucy Sidney, Anne Sidney, and Sir Henry Sidney.

The Sidneys became wealthy in the mid-fifteenth century as landowners in the Sussex-Surrey region. Frances' father, Sir William Sidney, lived between 1482 and 1554 and was a Courtier to Henry VII and Henry VIII. Consequently, the Sidneys were well known by the Royals.

== Marriage ==
Frances married Thomas Radclyffe, Lord Fitzwalter, at Hampton Court between 26 and 29 April 1555. The marriage was celebrated by a tournament in which the jure uxoris King of England, King Philip, participated in the jousts.

By this point, Fitzwalter was in favour at Court: he had been summoned to sit in the House of Lords and had been appointed a member of the Privy Council. Frances was not his first wife; Radclyffe's first wife, Elizabeth Wriothesley, died childless after ten years of marriage.

Thus, it was essential he find a new suitor to produce an heir to his patronage, so much so that he expeditiously married Frances three months after the death of his wife in January 1555. Eager to produce an heir, in 1556 Lady Sidney travelled to Ireland with her husband as he had just been appointed Lord Deputy of Ireland. This union, however, was also childless. Lady Sussex was therefore motivated to devote her estate towards her passion for education and the development a new eponymous college at the University of Cambridge.

== English administration in Ireland ==
=== Residence ===
A 24-year-old Lady Sidney accompanied the 30-year-old Lord Fitzwalter to Ireland, arriving “upon the quay of Dublin on Whit Sunday” in 1556. Thomas Radclyffe, Lord Fitzwalter, served as the Lord Deputy of Ireland from 1556 to 1560, earning the title of 3rd Earl of Sussex in 1557 (thus stylising Frances Sidney as Lady Sidney, Countess of Sussex), and later as Lord Lieutenant from 1560 to 1564.

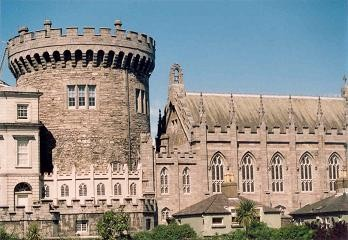
Dublin Castle has been described as “ruinous, foule, filthie, and greatlie decaied” at the time of their arrival in 1556.

When they arrived they were expected to be accommodated in the thirteenth century, vice-regal residence that was Dublin Castle, however, it was immediately determined to be unsuitable. Alternatively, and following in the example of Lord Deputy Anthony St Leger before them, Lord Fitzwalter and Lady Sidney occupied the priory of Kilmainham. While this property was four kilometres outside of Dublin, it avoided the awful living conditions of Dublin and had been renovated at the price of £100 some years prior. It served the Lord Deputy Sussex well until Sir Henry Sidney later renovated Dublin Castle in order to return the seat of English Government to its traditional position in Ireland.

=== Absence ===
The Sussex's spent a great deal of time away from Ireland, spending nearly 3 years of their 8-year tenure abroad. The Earl and Lady Sussex would often spend half the year in Ireland and the other half in England. The longest period of continuous stay in Ireland was towards the end of the Earl of Sussex's tenure as Lord Lieutenant, where they spent twenty-two consecutive months in Ireland. Frances remained by the Earl of Sussex's side for much of this time.

Their absence was due to the complete reluctance of English viceroys, such as the Earl of Sussex, to rule over Ireland. They were absent so frequently, they failed to form in Irish Court at any stage in their tenure. The wives of the viceroys of Ireland throughout this period, including Frances, failed to make a meaningful connection between Ireland and England due to their frequent absence and difficulty assimilating.

=== Life in Ireland ===
Life was difficult for Lady Sidney in Ireland, her lack of children impacted her status in the Irish public eye. The changing monarchs, from Edward IV to Mary to Elizabeth, meant there significant changes in religious practice over the years that were the cause of some controversy. This also made daily life difficult for Lady Sidney as the wives of the viceroys of Ireland were expected to be pious examples of faith.

=== Diplomacy ===
The Earl of Sussex was widely reputable for his martial governance. The Leicesters were firm critics of the Sussexes contemporaneously, and retrospectively, Brady criticises Lady Sidney's efforts. When Frances arrived in Ireland she was young and inexperienced. The frequent absence of the Earl and Lady of Sussex significantly impacted their ability to cultivate the relationships fostered with Maguire and O’Neill, two significant powers in Ireland at the time.

==== Diplomatic relations with Maguire ====
Upon arrival in Ireland in 1556, the Earl of Sussex was met with a number of militant factions, including from the Scots. Notwithstanding, the Earl of Sussex developed a good relationship with Sean Maguire, Lord of Fermanagh, and would go on to form a strong alliance with him. While the specifics are unclear, it is understood that Maguire presented Lady Sidney with two of his finest hawks, a symbolic gift often offered in Anglo-Irish diplomacy. Why he chose Lady Sidney as the recipient is unclear, nor is it clear how this impacted Lady Sidney's favour of Maguire when petitioning to her husband, but it is a symbolic gesture of solidarity.

==== Diplomatic relations with O'Neill ====
In 1557 Shane O’Neill, a Gaelic lord, asserted that his half-brother's claim to succeed the title of Earl of Tyrone was illegitimate. The Earl of Sussex repressed this claim, however, in 1559, upon the death of the incumbent Earl of Tyrone, O’Neill reasserted his claim. The Earl of Sussex protested against the intent of Queen Elizabeth I to grant O’Neill the Earldom and instead militated against him. After much conflict, O’Neill was victorious and recognised as the Earl of Tyrone. O’Neill then wrote to Elizabeth and requested to marry the Earl of Sussex's sister, Lady Frances Radclyffe.

== Court of Elizabeth I ==
The Earl of Sussex and the Earl of Leicester were said to be rivals for the favour of Elizabeth. Lady Sidney's brother, Sir Henry Sidney, married Mary Dudley, the eldest daughter of the Duke of Northumberland and sister of the Queen's favourite, Robert Dudley, 1st Earl of Leicester.

Arms of Frances Sidney, Countess of Sussex, namely Radclyffe (Argent, a bend engrailed sable) impaling Sidney (Or, a pheon point down azure). Also the arms of Sidney Sussex College, Cambridge, founded by her

There is no reference of Frances fulfilling any role in the Courts of Edward VI or Mary 1. In 1571 however, Frances fell into favour of Queen Elizabeth as her sister in law, Mary, was a chambermaid. Elizabeth visited the Earl and Countess of Sussex at their home in Bermondsey on two occasions in 1571. In this year both Mary and Frances contracted smallpox, an infection that disfigured Mary significantly, although the Queen and Frances recovered well. In 1578 Lady Sussex received her first appointments as a lady of the chamber of the queen.

On his deathbed, the Earl of Sussex warned Lady Sidney of the Earl of Leicester:

‘I am now passing into another world, and must leave you to your fortunes and the Queen's graces; but beware of the ‘Gypsy’; for he will be hard for you all. You know not the beast as well as I do’

In the last year of the Earl and Countess of Sussex's marriage, before his death, their relationship was frustrated by “malicious speeches and unconscionable extremities”; it is thought the Leicesters interfered with the ill Earl of Sussex to deprive Lady Sidney of his affection. The state of the Earl and Lady Sussex's relationship infuriated Elizabeth. In response, Lady Sidney wrote the Queen a desperate letter detailing the external forces that broke the “love of twenty-eight years continuance” even after she followed her husband “in health and in sickness, in wealth and woe”. Later, Lady Sidney also thanked Lord Burleigh for testifying her case to Elizabeth. The Queen did not accept Lady Sidney's letter; in 1585, Lady Sidney wrote to Her Majesty once again offering to substantiate her assertion that she shared a loving marriage with the Earl of Sussex.

== Death and legacy ==
The Earl of Sussex died on 9 June 1583. On his death, his will is said to have been “equitable, chilling, and legalistic” and he bequeathed Frances “all his jewels, valued at £3,169; 4,000 ounces of gilt plate; and the income from manors in Essex and estates in Norfolk”.

Following her husband's death, Lady Sidney became very bitter and increasingly supportive of Protestantism, adopting the motto “Dieu me garde de calomnie” (middle French for “God preserve me from calumny”). Her prudent management of the late Earl of Sussex's manors mean she became reputably wealthy in this time. In this period, Lady Sidney continued to be persecuted as the MP Arthur Hall, notoriously disreputable, published a vexatious pamphlet about her after she rejected his advances.

Lady Sidney died in her Bermondsey home on 9 March 1589. She was buried in the Chapel of St Paul, Westminster Abbey on 15 April 1589.

=== Sidney Sussex College, Cambridge ===
Lady Sidney had maintained passion for education throughout her time in the Court of Elizabeth. In Thomas Rogers' translation of Niels Hemmingsen's The Faith of the Church Militant, a powerful and scholarly Protestant work, Rogers included a dedication to Lady Sidney's support of education. In her will dated 6 December 1588 Lady Sidney stated she wished to use the estate she had inherited from her husband “to erect some good and godly monument for the maintenance of good learning”. Henry Gray, the Earl of Kent, was the chief executor of her will and the Lord Archbishop of Canterbury was the supervisor. Lady Sidney made arrangements to pay a perpetual annuity of £20 for the appointment of a biweekly lecturer at Westminster Abbey for ever, £100 to be distributed amongst the “godly ministers” of London, and £5000 for the erection and foundation of a new college at the University of Cambridge. The college would be founded as “Lady Frances Sidney Sussex College” with enough money sparing for the maintenance of one master, ten fellows, and twenty scholars.

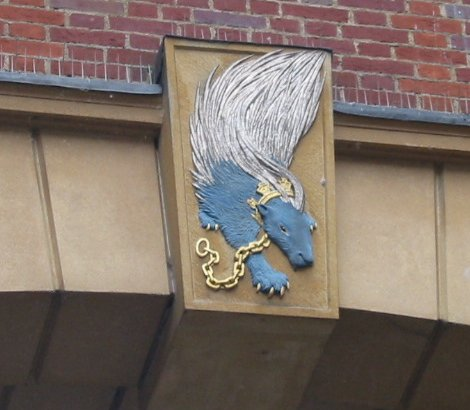
Heraldic emblem of Sidney Sussex College, a porcupine (statant) azure quills collar and chain or, being a crest of the Sidney family

The Earl of Kent and Sir John Harrington encountered considerable fiscal strain when establishing the college, in the event the funds were insufficient for the foundation of a college, Lady Sidney had also allowed the funds to go to the improvement of the existing Clare College, Cambridge. Were the latter the case, the college were to be renamed “Clare and Lady Frances Sidney Sussex College”.

Although the will was contested by relatives of Lady Sidney, all were unsuccessful and the college was founded in 1596, seven years after the reading of the will and after the personal intervention of Elizabeth, despite her dislike for Lady Sidney immediately prior to her death.

The porcupine appears on her 24 foot high marble and alabaster funerary monument in the chapel of St Paul, Westminster Abbey. In this monument, suspected to have been designed by Ralph Symons and sculpted by Richard Stevens, she is depicted in the coronet of a countess.

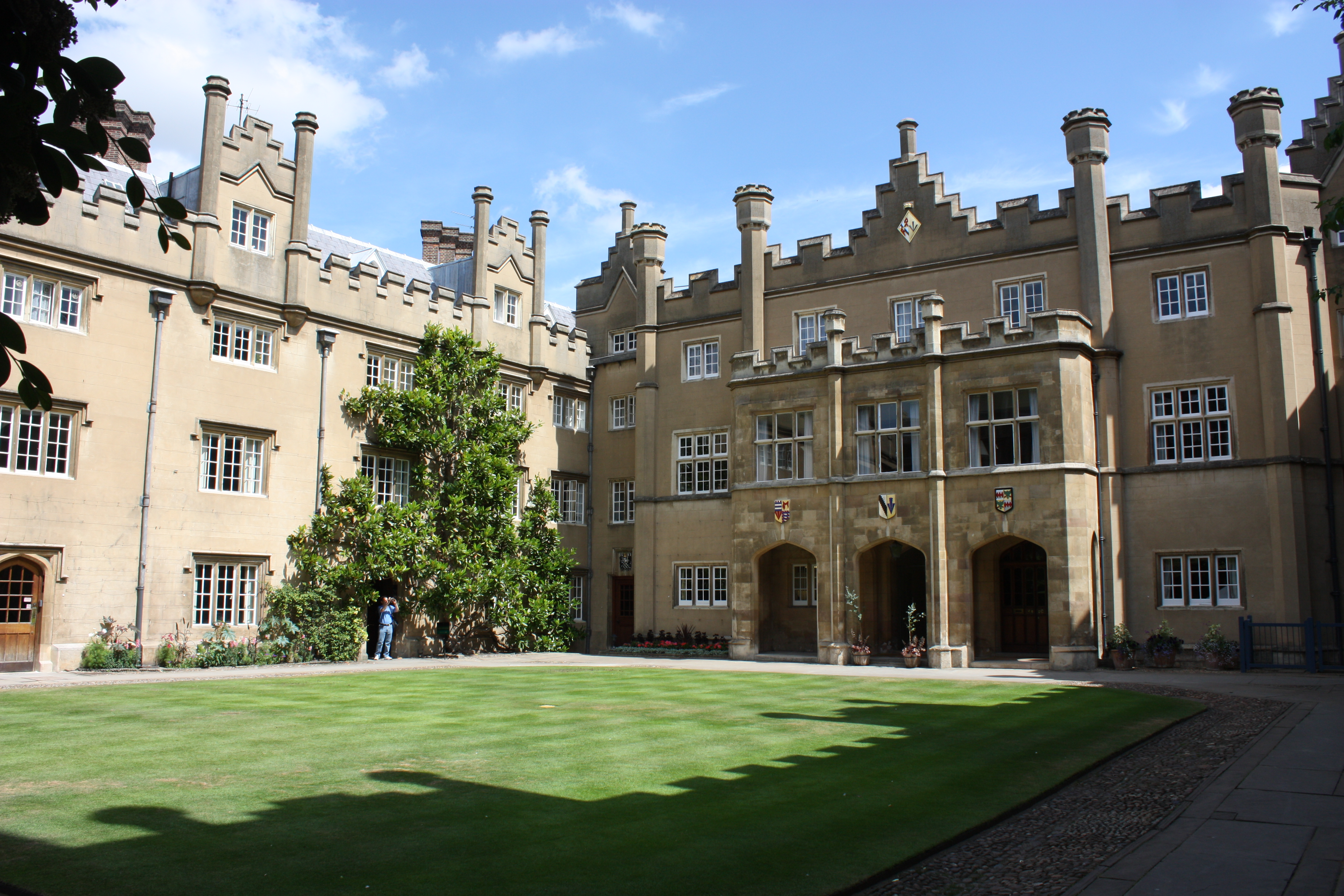
Chapel Court in 2010

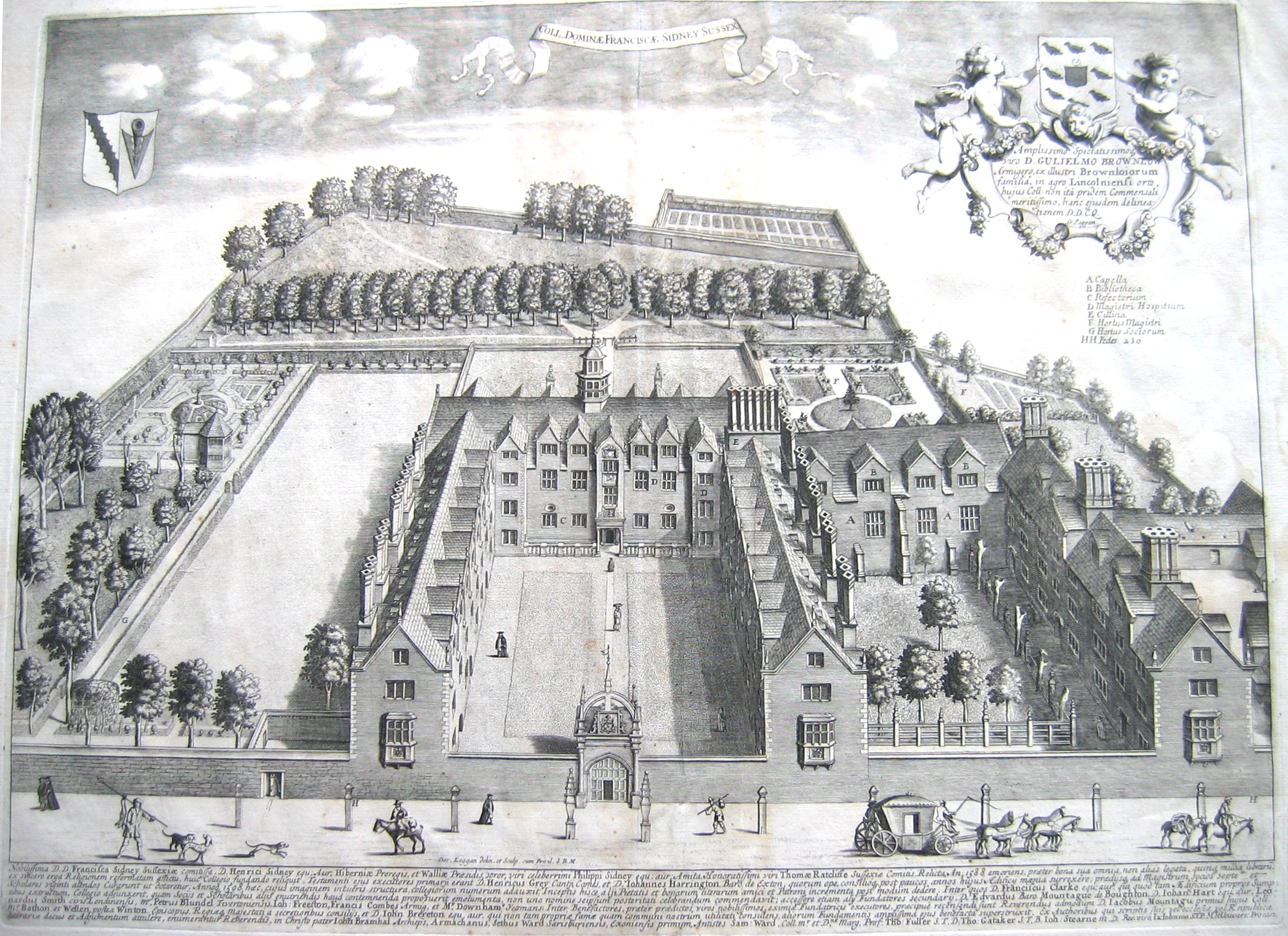
Bird's eye view of Sidney Sussex College, Cambridge by David Loggan, published 1690

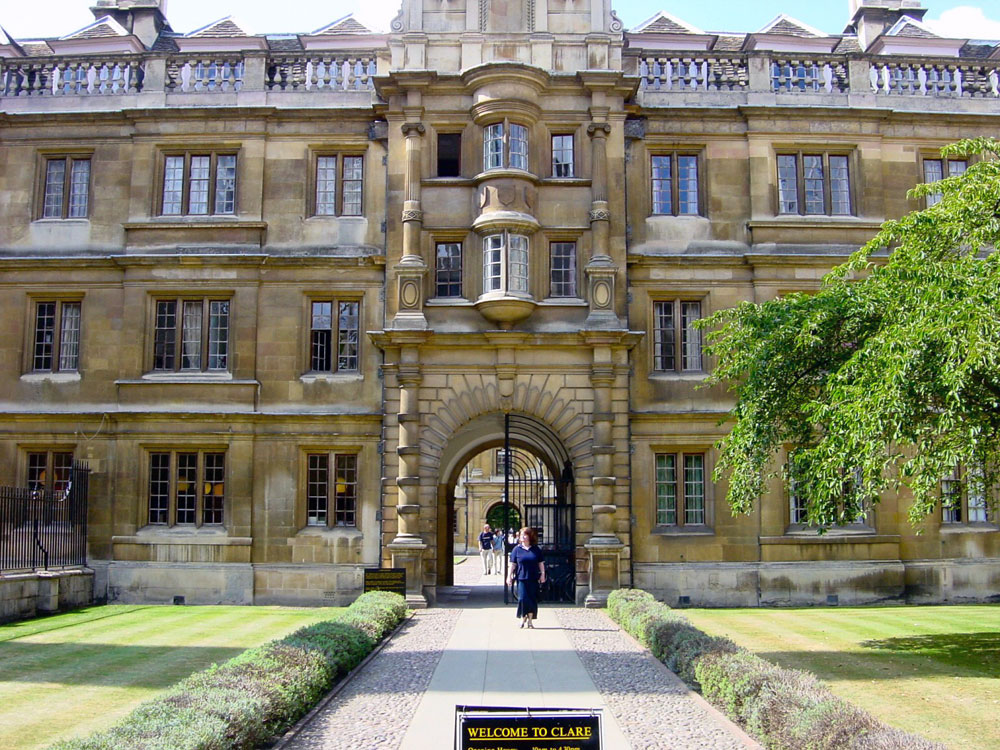
Clare College, Cambridge, the college which would have received Lady Sidney's inheritance but for the persistence of her executors.
