= Richard Penty =

British engineer and academic

- Born: 9 September 1964 (age 60); Nottingham, Nottinghamshire, England
- Citizenship: British
- Education: Repton School
- Alma mater: Sidney Sussex College, Cambridge
- Scientific career
- Fields: Physics; Electronic engineering Photonics
- Institutions: University of Bath; University of Bristol; University of Cambridge; Sidney Sussex College, Cambridge

Richard Vincent Penty, FREng (born 9 September 1964) is a British engineer and academic. He is the Head of the School of Technology and Professor of Photonics at the University of Cambridge.

== Early life ==
Penty was born on 9 September 1964 in Nottingham, Nottinghamshire, England. He is the oldest of three sons of two Uttoxeter medical practitioners, Peter and Patricia Janet (née Shelbourne) Penty. He was educated at Repton School, an independent school in Repton, Derbyshire. He studied engineering and electrical science at Sidney Sussex College, Cambridge, and graduated from the University of Cambridge with a Bachelor of Arts (BA) degree in 1986. He remained at Cambridge to undertake postgraduate study in engineering, specialising in nonlinear optical fibre devices. In 1989, he entered his doctoral thesis titled "Novel optical fibre Kerr devices for signal processing". He completed his Doctor of Philosophy (PhD) degree in 1990.

== Academic career ==
After finishing his studies at the University of Cambridge, Penty became a lecturer in the School of Physics at the University of Bath. He held the post from 1990 to 1995. In 1996, he joined the University of Bristol as a lecturer in electrical and electronic engineering. He was promoted to Reader and then Professor of Photonics.

In 2001, he moved from Bristol to the University of Cambridge as Professor of Photonics in its Department of Engineering. He was elected a fellow of Sidney Sussex College, Cambridge in 2002. He served as Deputy Vice-Master of the college in 2008 and Vice-Master from 2011 to 2012. He was Acting Master from 2012 to 2013, before his election as the 27th Master of Sidney Sussex College in 2013, stepping down in 2023. In 2019 he was appointed Deputy Head of the School of Technology and in 2020 as a Deputy Vice Chancellor of the University. In 2023 he became Head of the School of Technology, one of the six academic Schools of the University of Cambridge.

His main research interests lie in the field of photonics. He has worked for many years on short reach photonic networks for in-building links. This included working on the Ethernet standards and is now concentrating on advanced modulation format approaches to realising 100 Gbit/s photonic links using a single optical source. In parallel he has research on polymer waveguide links and sub-systems for on-board and board to board, including backplane, applications. His research on radio over fibre for in-building radio coverage has resulted in the spin out Zinwave.

He is involved in research projects studying the energy efficiency of photonic networks and how these can be improved, in co-operation with higher layers in the network stack, to provide better energy efficiency for the internet.

One of his major research themes is currently photonic integration of III-V photonic components. He was involved in the realisation of a 16x16 photonic switch which had the time had the largest number of active components integrated together on a single chip. He is involved in European research efforts to develop a generic foundry for III-V PICs and is part of the Advisory Board for the Jeppix activity which seeks to broker the developing capability to users.

He has also carried out research on broad area RFID systems, where the detection range of passive RFID tags has been greatly improved. Research is now continuing on localisation using passive RFID. The spin out company PervasID has been formed to commercialise the RFID research.

== Honours ==
In 2012, Penty was elected a Fellow of the Royal Academy of Engineering (FREng). In the same year he became a Fellow of the Institution of Engineering and Technology. In 2022 he was awarded a DSc degree by the University of Cambridge.

== Personal life ==
In 1992, Penty married Victoria Frances Mary Eve. They have three children together: two sons and one daughter.

Academic offices
Preceded by Andrew Wallace-Hadrill	Master of Sidney Sussex College, Cambridge; 2013 – 2023	Succeeded by Martin Burton
