= David Owens =

David John Owens APM (born 1962) is the former Deputy Commissioner (Specialist Operations) of the New South Wales Police Force in Australia and was appointed to the position in August 2011 having performed the role of Deputy Commissioner (Field Operations) since December 2007.

== Personal ==
Owens was born in 1962 and grew up in the Eastern Suburbs in Sydney. He was educated at Waverley College and is married with three children.

== Career ==
Owens joined the New South Wales Police Force in 1981, performing general duties and investigative roles at Rose Bay, Waverley, Bondi and Randwick. He was appointed as Venue Commander for Sailing during the 2000 Summer Olympics in Sydney. Owens was promoted to Local Area Commander at Eastern Beaches and later Commander, Professional Standards Command at the New South Wales Crime Commission. In 2006, he was appointed Region Commander, South West Metropolitan Region before transferring into the position of Region Commander, Central Metropolitan Region.

In December 2007, Owens was appointed as Deputy Commissioner, Field Operations assuming responsibility for over 12 000 police officers. In August 2011, Owens was appointed as Deputy Commissioner, Specialist Operations assuming responsibility for a number of commands including the State Crime Command and Counter Terrorism & Special Tactics Command.

Prior to his appointment as Deputy Commissioner, he performed duties as an Operational Commander for the APEC Leaders Week held in Sydney during September 2007 and was the overall Commander for World Youth Day 2008 held in Sydney during July 2008.

Owens was appointed by the Governor of New South Wales as the State Emergency Operations Controller in December 2007 until August 2011 making him the longest serving appointee since the position was introduced in 1989. This appointment, under the State Emergency & Rescue Management Act 1989, gives oversight to the management of emergencies and disasters that occur within New South Wales. Owens oversaw response operations and supporting arrangements to a number of significant emergencies, both within New South Wales and abroad. This included State resources to the Victorian Black Saturday bushfires in 2009 and Christchurch earthquake in 2011.

Owens was the corporate sponsor for the New South Wales Police Force Mental Health Intervention Team project and the Incident Command System training program. Both initiatives have since been successfully implemented across the organisation.

He holds a master's degree in Leadership & Management from Charles Sturt University, a Diploma of Criminology from Sydney University and a Graduate Certificate of Management from the University of Wollongong. Owens is a graduate of the FBI National Executive Institute ( 2009 ) and is a member of the Australian Institute of Company Directors.

After a career spanning over thirty years in the NSW Police Force, David Owens retired in 2012 on medical grounds.

Owens was appointed by the NSW Government in 2020 to undertake an Independent Inquiry into the 2019/20 Black Summer bushfires with former NSW Chief Scientist Professor Mary O'Kane.

== Honours ==
On 28 August 1997, he was awarded the National Medal.

On 26 January 2007, he was awarded the Australian Police Medal ( APM ).
