= Sidney Sussex College, Cambridge =

Constituent college of the University of Cambridge

Sidney Sussex College
- University of Cambridge
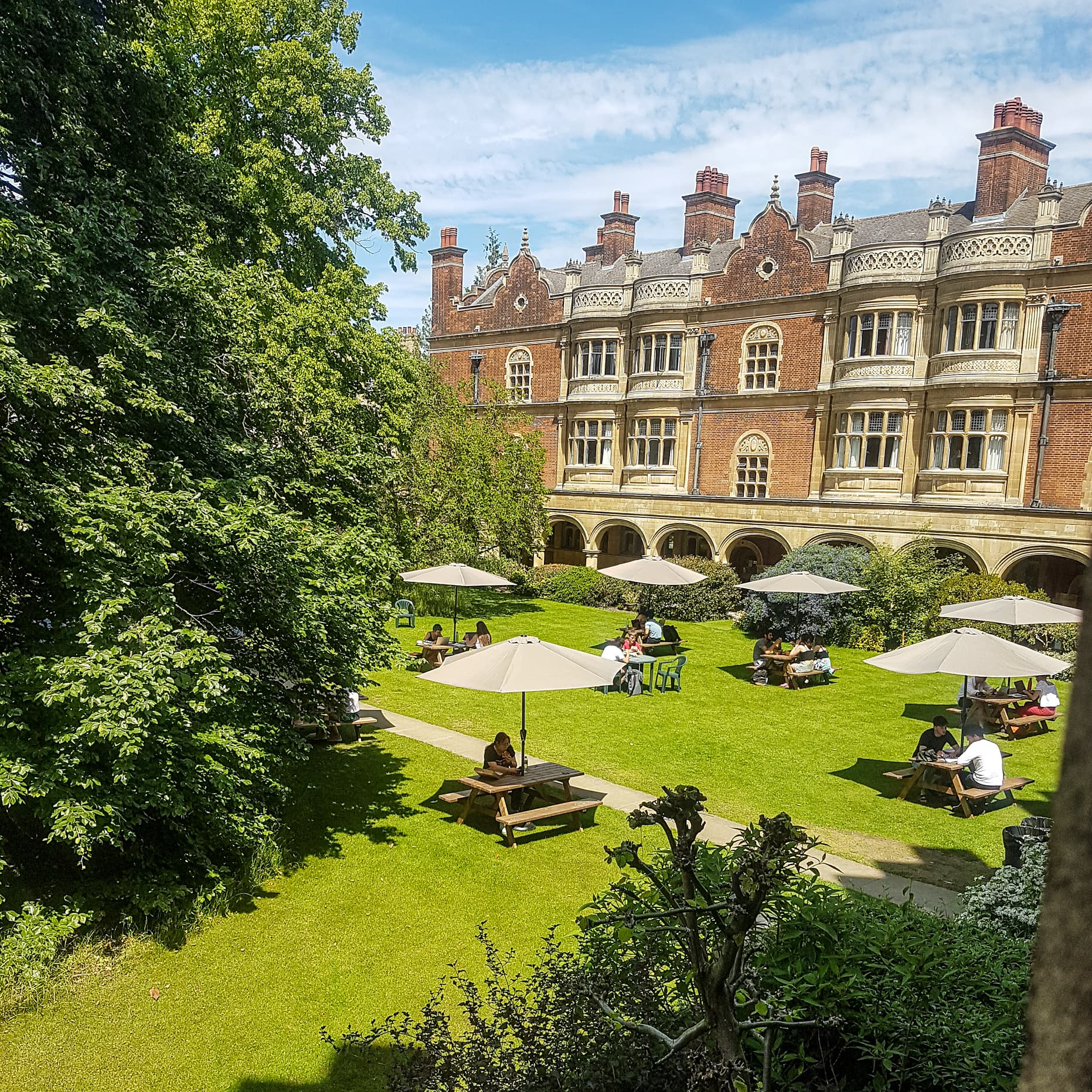
- Cloister Court, Sidney Sussex College

- Arms of Sidney Sussex College; Arms: Argent, a bend engrailed sable, impaling Or, a pheon point down azure
Scarf colours: two equal halves of dark-red and navy
- Location: Sidney Street
- Coordinates: 52.2075°N 0.1208°E
- Full name: The College of the Lady Frances Sidney Sussex
- Abbreviation: SID
- Motto: Dieu me garde de calomnie (Middle French)
- Motto in English: God preserve me from calumny
- Founder: Frances Sidney, Countess of Sussex
- Established: 1596; 430 years ago
- Sister college: St John's College, Oxford
- Master: Martin Burton
- Undergraduates: 396 (2022-23)
- Postgraduates: 240 (2022-23)
- Fellows: 80
- Endowment: £29m (2022)
- Visitor: Viscounts De L'Isle ex officio
- Website: www.sid.cam.ac.uk
- MCR: www.sid.cam.ac.uk/life-sidney/clubs-and-societies/mcr
- Boat club: Sidney Sussex Boat Club

Map
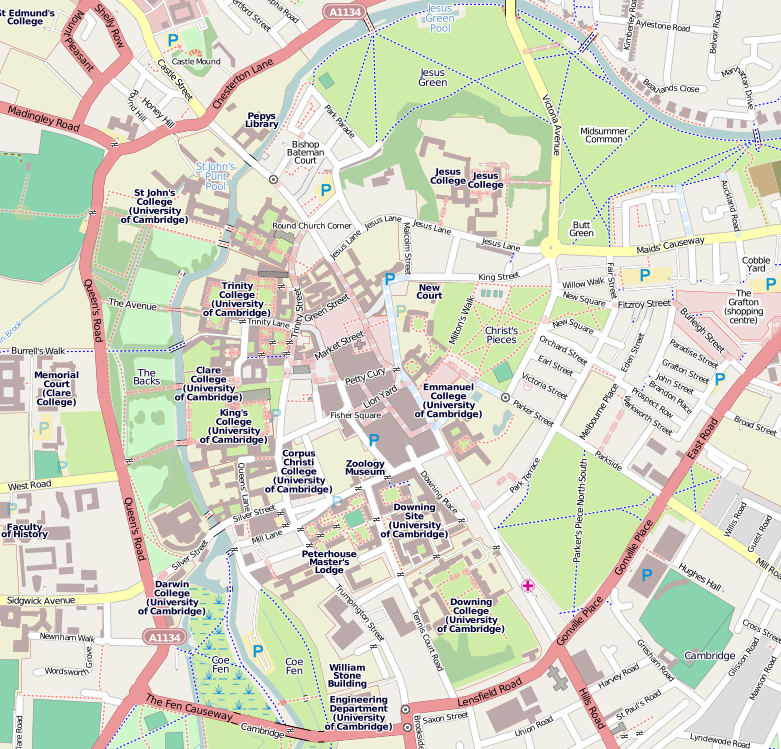
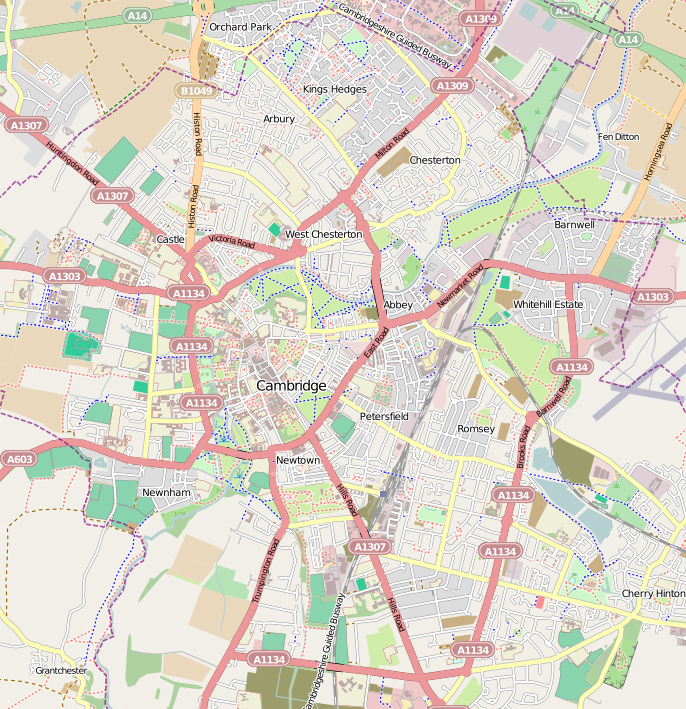
- Location within Central Cambridge Location within Cambridge

Sidney Sussex College (historically known as "Sussex College" and today referred to informally as "Sidney") is a constituent college of the University of Cambridge in England. The College was founded in 1596 under the terms of the will of Frances Sidney, Countess of Sussex (1531–1589), wife of Thomas Radclyffe, 3rd Earl of Sussex, and named after its foundress. In her will, Lady Sidney left the sum of £5,000 together with some plate to found a new College at Cambridge University "to be called the Lady Frances Sidney Sussex College". Her executors Sir John Harington and Henry Grey, 6th Earl of Kent, supervised by Archbishop John Whitgift, founded the Protestant college seven years after her death.

Sidney Sussex is one of the smaller colleges at Cambridge, with its sister college being St John's College, Oxford. The student body comprises approximately 355 undergraduates, 275 postgraduates, and around 80 fellows.

== History ==
=== Foundation ===
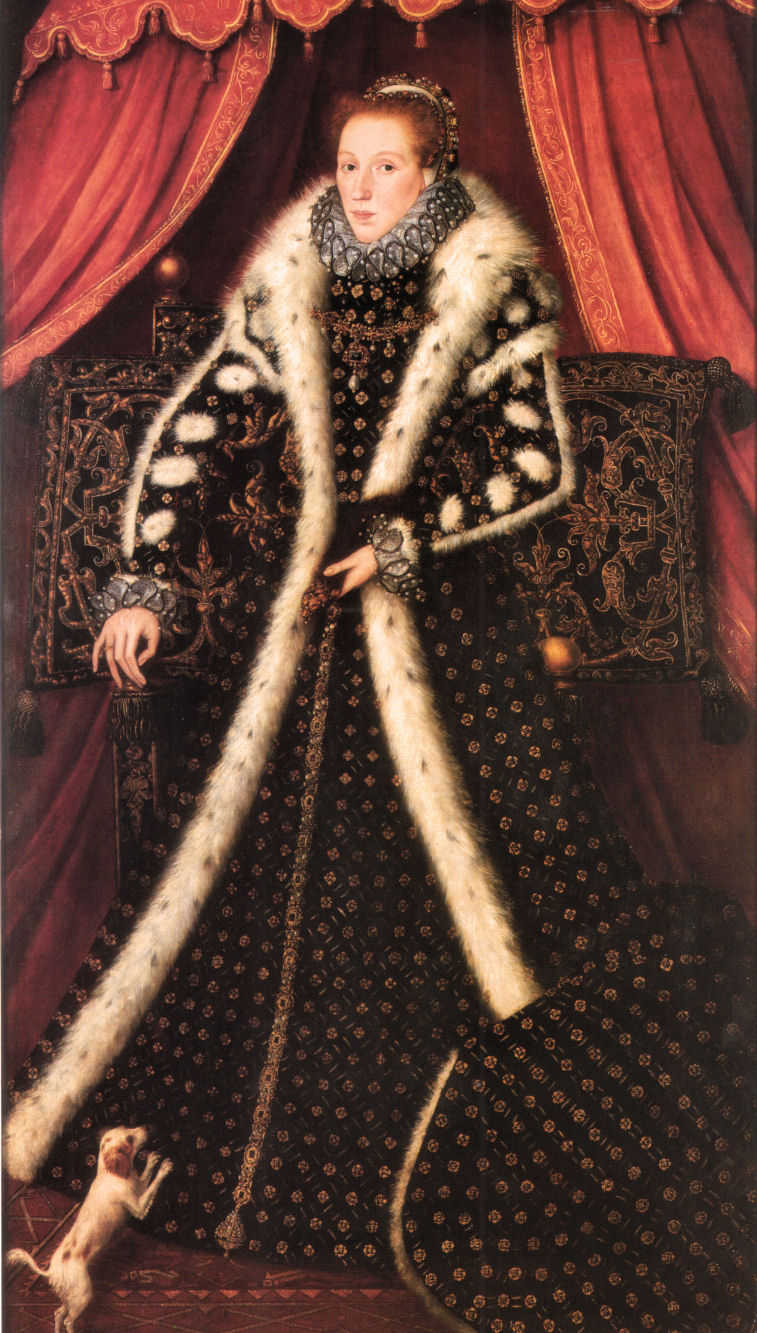
Frances Sidney, Countess of Sussex, Founder of the College

Sidney Sussex College Act 1592
- Act of Parliament
- Parliament of England
- Long title: An Act that the late scite of the dissolved house of the Gray Fryers in or near Cambridge may be sold, or lett in fea-farme, or otherwise, for the erection of a new college in the university of Cambridge.
- Citation: 35 Eliz. 1. c. 2 Pr.
- Territorial extent: England and Wales

Dates
- Royal assent: 10 April 1593

Status: Current legislation

Before Sidney's founding as a Protestant seminary, the site was home to the Grey Friars, or Franciscans, for nearly three centuries. In the 1950s, excavations revealed remnants of the complex, a lay graveyard with reburied skeletons, shattered stained glass, and a large Saxon jar. The medieval cellars beneath Hall Court, where Sidney's wine is stored, are remnants of this era.

The college was founded in 1596 under the terms of the will of Frances Sidney, Countess of Sussex (1531–1589), wife of Thomas Radclyffe, 3rd Earl of Sussex, and named after its foundress. It was from its inception an avowedly Protestant foundation; "some good and godlie moniment for the mainteynance of good learninge". In her will, Lady Frances Sidney left the sum of £5,000 together with some plate to found a new college at Cambridge University "to be called the Lady Frances Sidney Sussex College". Her executors Sir John Harington and Henry Grey, 6th Earl of Kent, supervised by Archbishop John Whitgift, founded the college seven years after her death.

The college secured 40 student admissions in its first year with the second year - (Michaelmas 1599 to Michaelmas 1600) - welcoming a further 27. Numbers remained low in the college's first decade with 14 students being admitted in 1608. By 1617, there was over 100 residents in total. Before 1628, there was no more than "35 chambers (bedrooms) in College", requiring many students to share a bedroom with one or more "chamber-fellows". It is thought that when at Sidney Sussex in 1616-17, Oliver Cromwell had the luxury of having "only one chamber-fellow".

=== Expansion ===
While the college's geographic size has changed little since 1596, an additional range was added to the original E-shaped buildings in the early 17th century and the appearance of the whole college was changed significantly in the 1820s and 1830s, under the leadership of the master at the time, William Chafy. By the early 19th century, the buildings' original red brick was unfashionable and the hall range was suffering serious structural problems.

The opening up of coal mines on estates left to the college in the 18th century provided extra funds, which were to be devoted to providing a new mathematical library and accommodation for mathematical exhibitioners. Also with those funds, the exterior brick was covered with a layer of cement, the existing buildings were heightened slightly, and the architectural effect was also heightened, under the supervision of Sir Jeffry Wyatville.

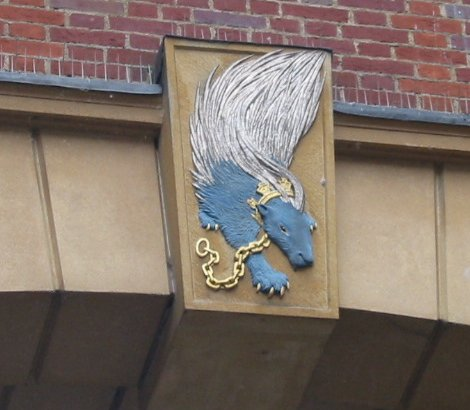
Heraldic emblem of Sidney Sussex College, a porcupine (statant) azure quills collar and chain or, being the crest of the Sidney family

In the late nineteenth century, the college's finances received a further boost from the development of the resort of Cleethorpes on college land on the Lincolnshire coast. This land had been purchased in 1616, following a bequest for the benefit of scholars and fellows by Peter Blundell, a merchant from Tiverton, Devon. A new wing (Cloister Court), added in 1891 to the designs of John Loughborough Pearson, is stylistically richer than the original buildings and has stone staircases, whereas the stairs in the older buildings are made of timber.

In the early twentieth century, a High Church group among the fellows was instrumental in the rebuilding and enlargement of the chapel, which was provided with a richly carved interior in late seventeenth-century style, designed by Thomas Henry Lyon, and somewhat at odds with the college's original Puritan ethos.

== Buildings and grounds ==
Sidney's buildings blend old and new, with the latest addition, the Old Kitchen (new dining space), completed in 2021. Student rooms have kitchen access, but also have catered options. Sidney sits on the site of Cambridge's Franciscan friary, built in the middle of the 13th century and dissolved in the 1530s. Artefacts of the site's past lie beneath the foundations of the college buildings. Sidney Sussex has two courtyards surrounded by Grade I listed buildings dating from 1596.

=== Chapel Court ===
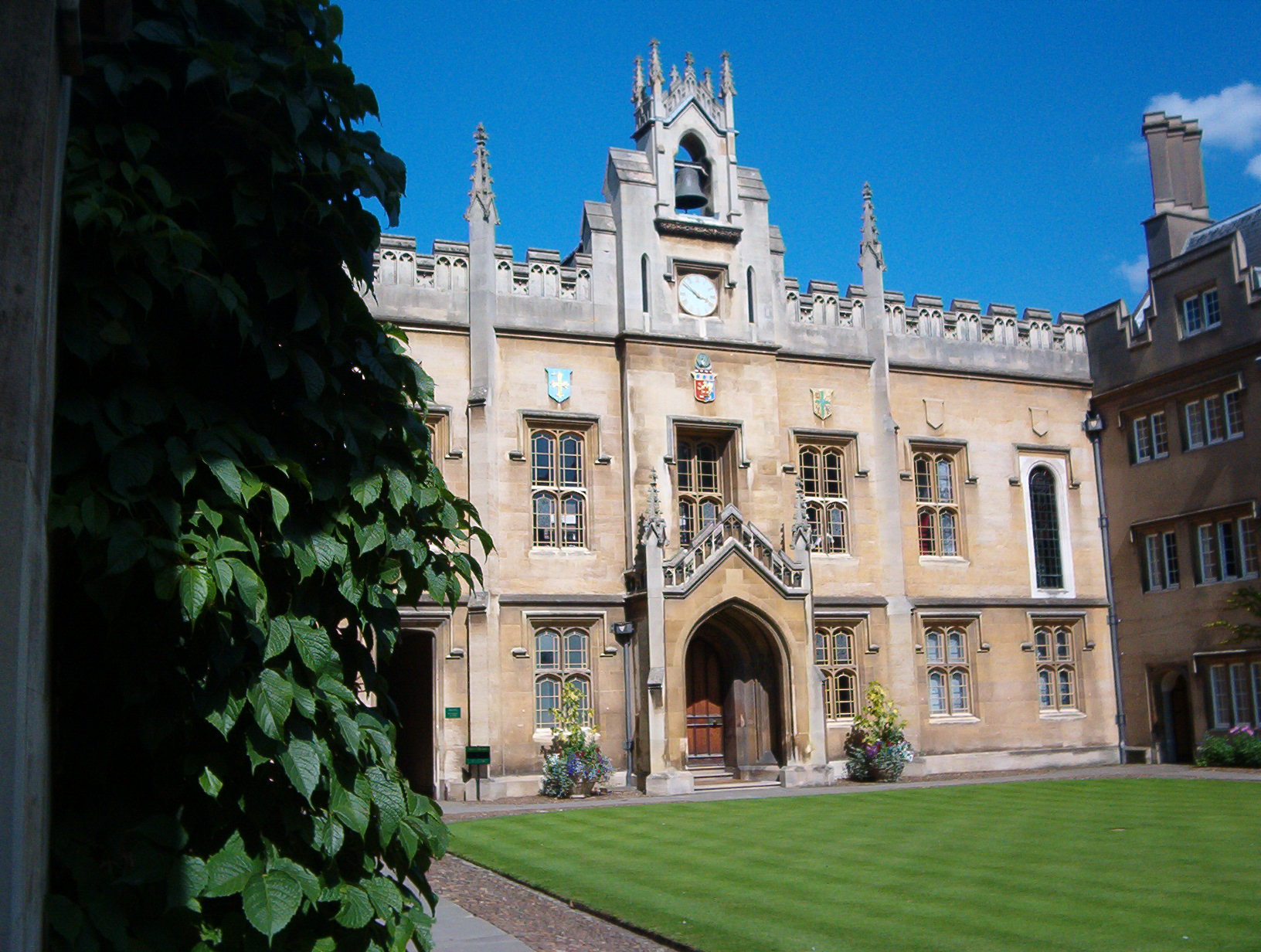
Chapel Court, Sidney Sussex College

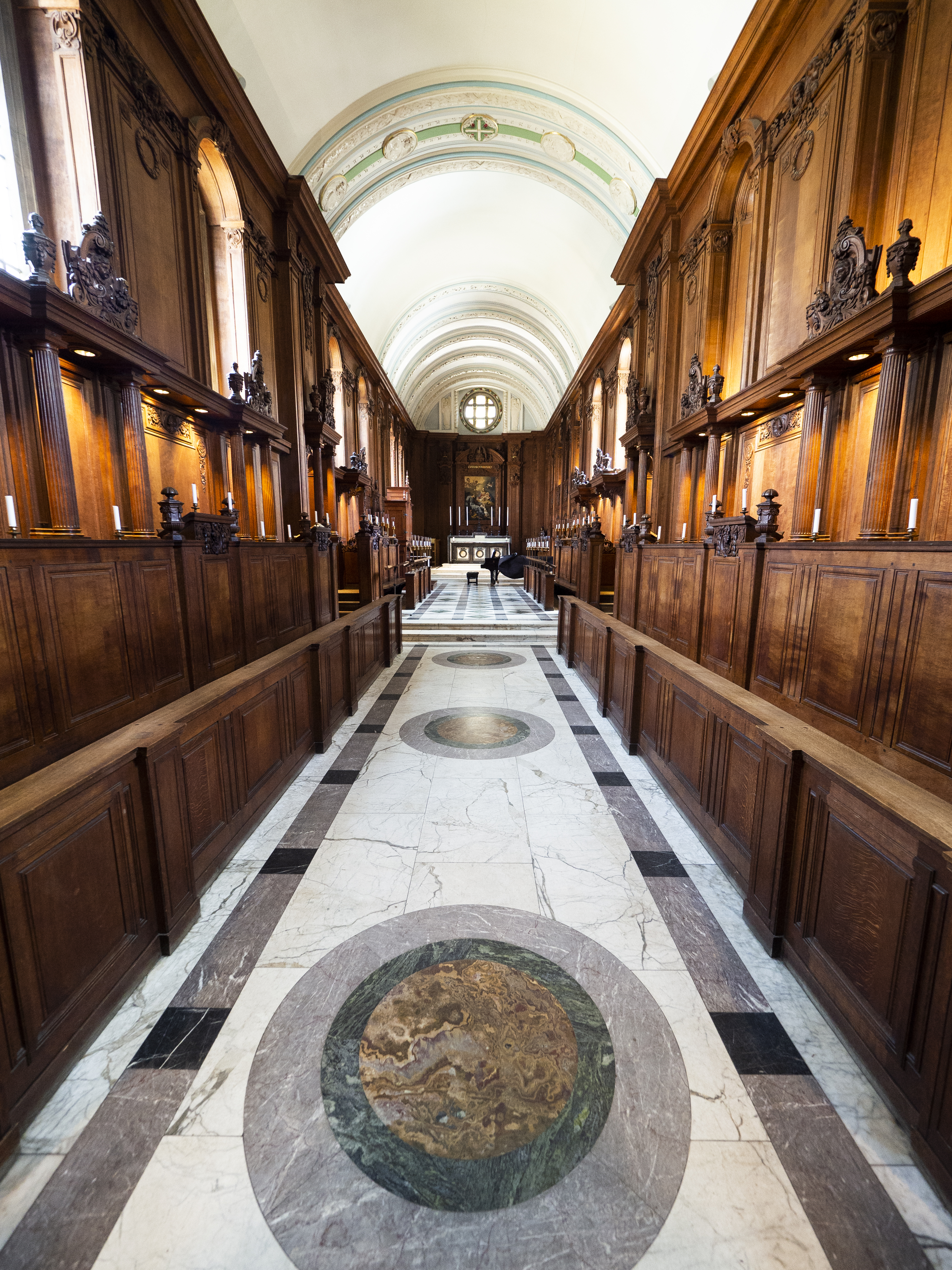
Sidney Sussex College Chapel

This court incorporates a number of buildings that house offices, the Junior Common Room (JCR) and a wood panelled chapel. The old chapel, built by James Essex in the 1770s, was very small at 20 by 30 feet (6 by 9 metres). The old bell, bought from Pembroke Hall in 1707 and recast in 1739, was retained until 1930 when it was replaced with a new one. The current building was rebuilt in the 18th century, and has been extended a number of times in subsequent centuries. The exterior was entirely remodelled in 1833 to match the Gothic style of the rest of the buildings. The work to the new chapel was completed in 1923. The antechapel now contains wall memorials to the dead of the two world wars and to three masters, Parris, Elliston and Chafy. The presence of Oliver Cromwell's head, buried somewhere nearby, is marked by a tablet installed in 1960.

The carved interior of the Chapel was installed in the early 20th century to suit the High Church tastes of a group of college fellows. The Chapel is open throughout the day as a space for the college community, regardless of faith or background. The Chapel includes a Steinway grand piano, a harpsichord, a chamber organ and a Flentrop organ.

=== Hall Court ===
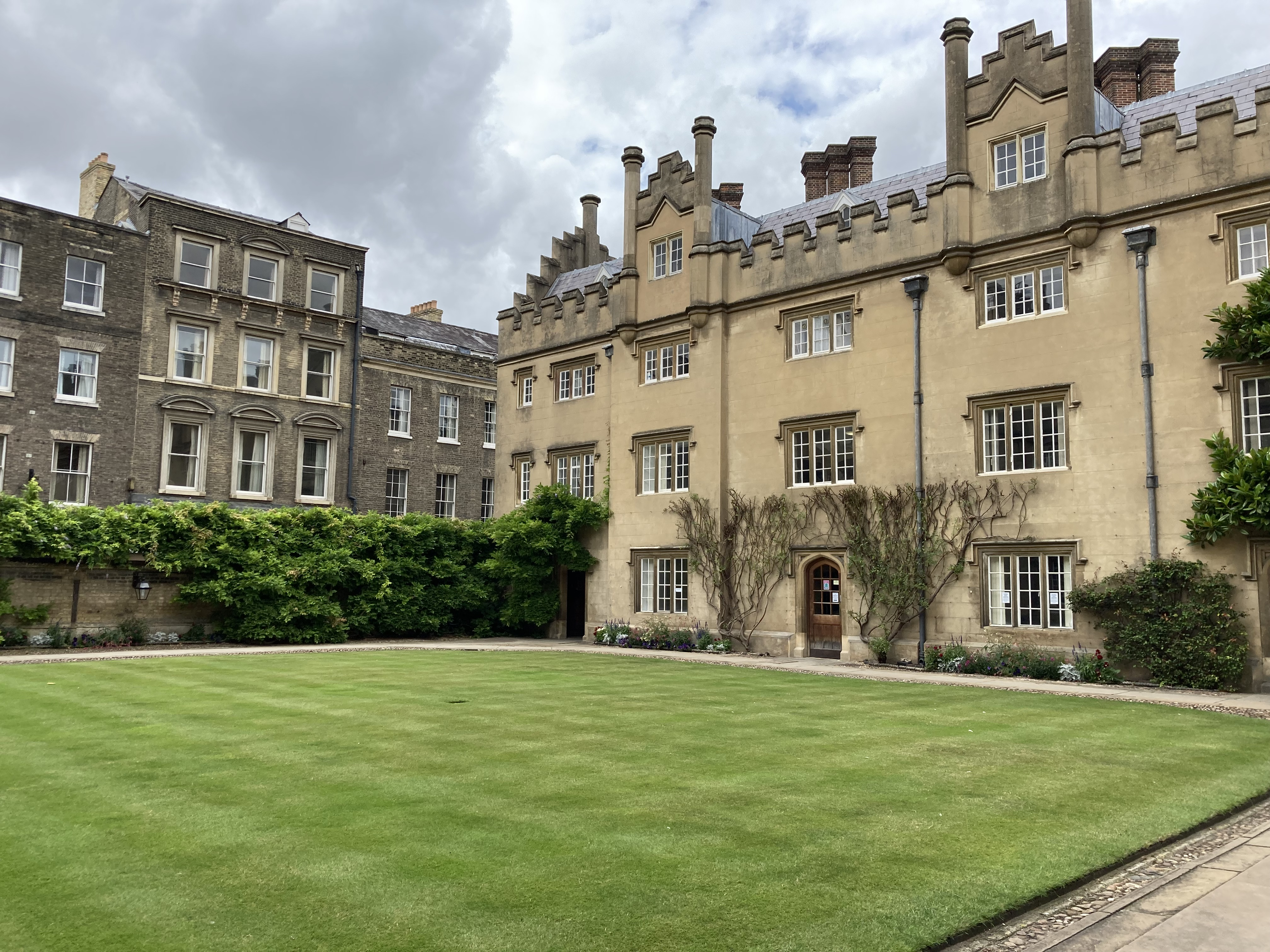
Hall Court, Sidney Sussex College

Hall Court is enclosed by a range of Gothic buildings incorporating the Master's Lodge, Buttery and the new Kitchen buildings, but the Court's name comes from Sidney's Dining Hall. The dining hall was redesigned by Sir James Burrough in 1752. The hall had been in poor repair, and the 'elegant Rococo room' that emerged from the remodelling was seen as a way to attract students and Fellows. Sidney's Dining Hall features decorated plasterwork, pillars, and an elaborate rococo ceiling with a centrepiece of scrolls and acanthus foliage. A portrait of the college's founder, Lady Frances Sidney, Countess of Sussex, is mounted over the high table.

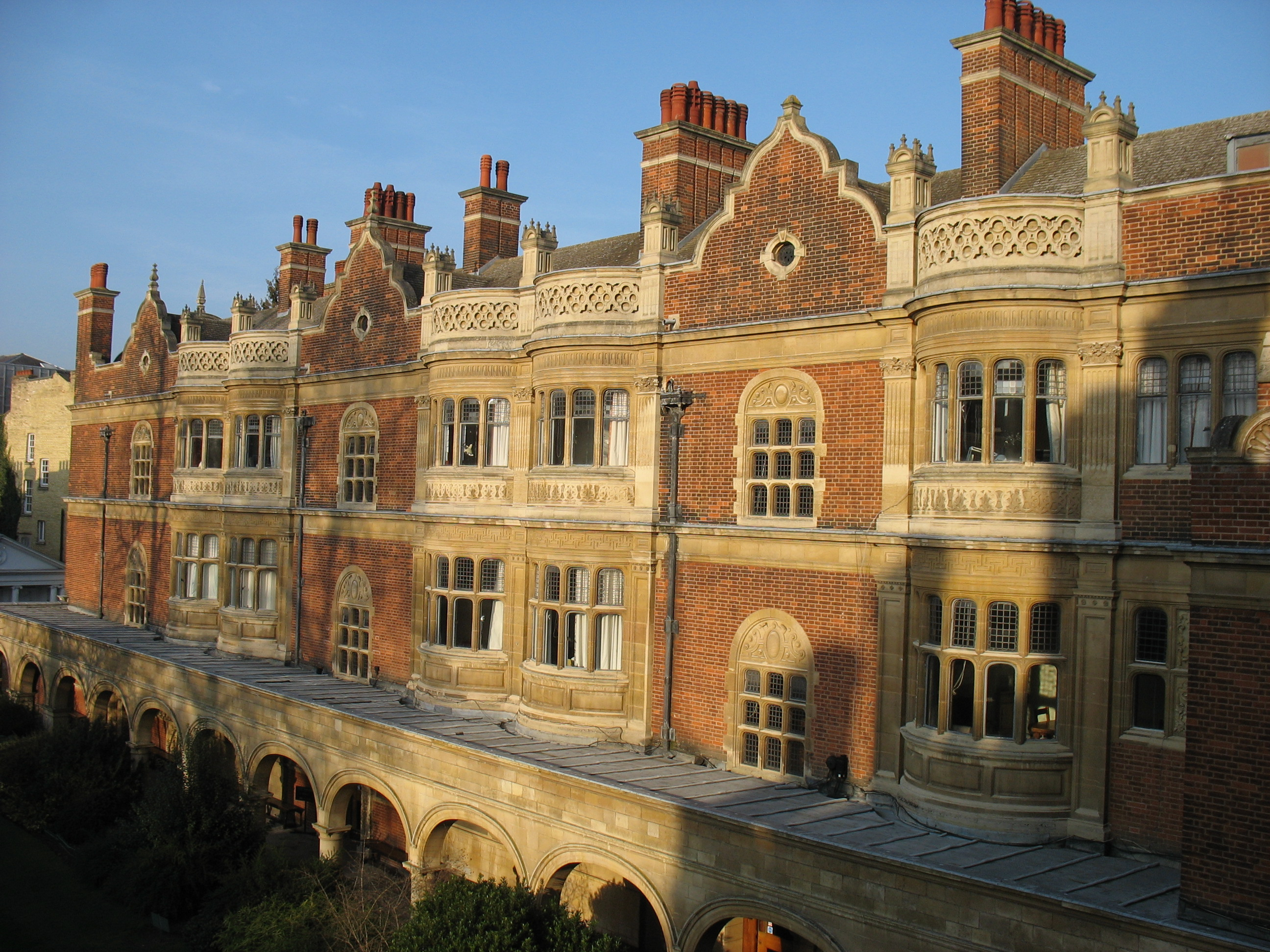
Cloister Court, Sidney Sussex College

=== Cloister Court ===
Cloister Court, completed in 1891, was designed by John Loughborough Pearson in the Gothic revival style, incorporating elements that reflect the Franciscan heritage of the site.

== Choir ==
The Choir of Sidney Sussex College, Cambridge is made up of six to eight sopranos, six altos (male and female), six tenors, three baritones, and three basses. During term-time the choir has a regular commitment in the chapel to Choral Evensong on Fridays and Sundays and Latin Choral Vespers on Wednesdays.

A number of choral scholarships are available for members of the Sidney Choir. In addition to singing Evensong in the chapel, the Choir has made some recordings and tours regularly in the UK and overseas. The Choir was nominated for a 2013 Gramophone Award in recognition of their disc of the music of Thomas Weelkes. The Sidney Sussex College Music Society organises concerts and recitals, and the college runs a number of instrumental and vocal ensembles.

== Student life ==
The Sidney Sussex College Students' Union (JCR) represents undergraduate students at Sidney through organizing and managing social events and spaces, promoting the welfare and education of students, and representing student interests within the college. SSCSU is also responsible for the operation Sidney's college bar, which is open to all Sidney members and their guests.

The Middle Common Room (MCR) is Sidney's postgraduate community and serves similarly to the SSCSU. The Sidney MCR represents and supports the college's PhD, master's, and Part III students, as well as medical students in their 4th year and beyond.

=== Boat Club ===
Sidney Sussex College Boat Club is the college rowing club. Founded in 1837, the men's side of the club has spent most of its time in the 2nd division of the Lent and May Bumps, with brief times spent in the 1st and 3rd divisions. The men's side of the club generally crews two boats in the Lent Bumps and three boats in the May Bumps. Being a small college, the club has never had the consistency to rise to take a headship of either event, and has been as high as 6th in the Lent Bumps in 1913, and 11th in the May Bumps in 1923.

A women's crew was first formed in 1978 and has spent most of its time hovering between 1st and 2nd divisions in both the Lent and May Bumps. Sidney's 1st Women's VIII re-entered division 1 of the Lent Bumps in 2022 for the first time since 2004, and re-entered division 1 of the May Bumps in 2024 for the first time since 1998. The women's side of the club generally crews one or two boats in the Lent Bumps and two boats in the May Bumps.

In Lent Bumps 2020, Sidney Sussex were the winners of the Marconi Cup, which is awarded to the highest performing of boat club overall. The Women's second boat were winners of blades, bumping a total of five times.

=== Sidney Sussex Cricket Club ===
During Lent term, Sidney holds indoor cricket training sessions, while outdoor training and matches, including the renowned inter-collegiate 'Cuppers' competition, occur in Easter term. Additionally, the college organises social events throughout the academic year.

=== Confraternitas Historica ===
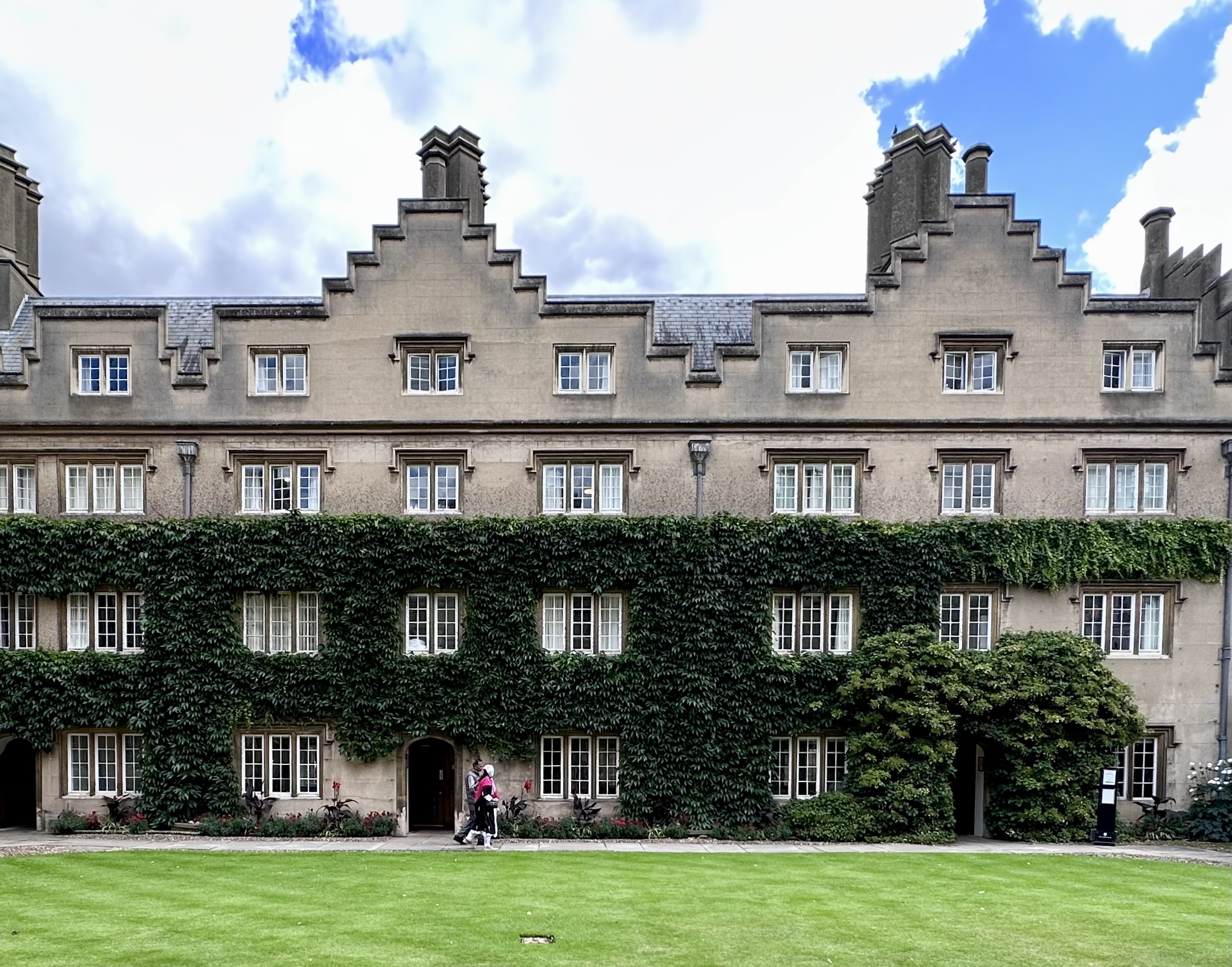
Chapel Court, Sidney Sussex College

The Confraternitas Historica, or Confraternitas Historica Dominae Franciscae Comitis Sussexiae, is the history society of Sidney Sussex College and is reputed to be the longest-running student history society in Europe, having existed since 1910. In fact, no meetings were held from 1914 to 1919 but since, during the First World War, "the University itself almost ceased to function ... the hiatus of 1914–19 is not counted as a break in the continuity of the society".

The Latin name of the society reflects the tastes of Jack Reynolds, the fellow who presided over its creation, who also "endowed the Society with an elaborate Latin initiation ceremony". Similarly, rather than being led by a President, the student in charge of the society is instead 'Princeps'. Other society roles include the 'Magister,' 'Tribune,' 'Pontifex Maximus,' and 'Comes'. During society meetings all attendees are referred to in an egalitarian, though still Latinate, manner. Regardless of academic standing or title, all attendees are given the title of 'soror' (sister) or 'frater' (brother).

=== Wilson-Walker Society ===
The Wilson-Walker Society is the scientific society in Sidney Sussex College, for all undergraduates, postgraduates, and fellows of the college. The society is named after two Nobel Laureates from the college: Charles Thomson Rees Wilson (inventor of the cloud chamber) and Sir John Ernest Walker (for his work on the structure of ATP synthase). The society frequently hosts talks with academics, which are often followed by formal dinners.

=== University Challenge ===
Sidney Sussex College has a strong history on the iconic quiz show University Challenge, having won the competition in both 1971 and 1978–79. The 1978–79 team, consisting of John Gilmore, John Adams, David Lidington, and Nick Graham, not only won the original series but also claimed victory in the University Challenge Reunited competition in 2002, which brought together past winning teams.

During the University Challenge Reunited competition in 2002, the 1979 team had originally secured a place in the semi-finals as the fourth highest-scoring team, with 275 points, before going on to win the competition. They achieved the following impressive scores to victory:

- First round: Sidney Sussex, 1979: 275 points, Trinity College, Oxford, 1972: 185 points
- Second round: Sidney Sussex, 1979: 390 points, Somerville College, Oxford, 2002: 90 points
- Final: Sidney Sussex, 1979: 375 points, Keele University, 1968: 185 points

David Lidington, who later became a prominent member of Theresa May's government, captained the team during the Reunited series. He also featured in a BBC documentary marking 60 years of University Challenge, reflecting on the team's experiences. Nicholas Graham fondly remembered the 2002 competition, recalling the team's initial reservations about returning after so many years but being delighted by their performance.

Sidney Sussex last appeared on University Challenge in 2018.

=== May Ball ===
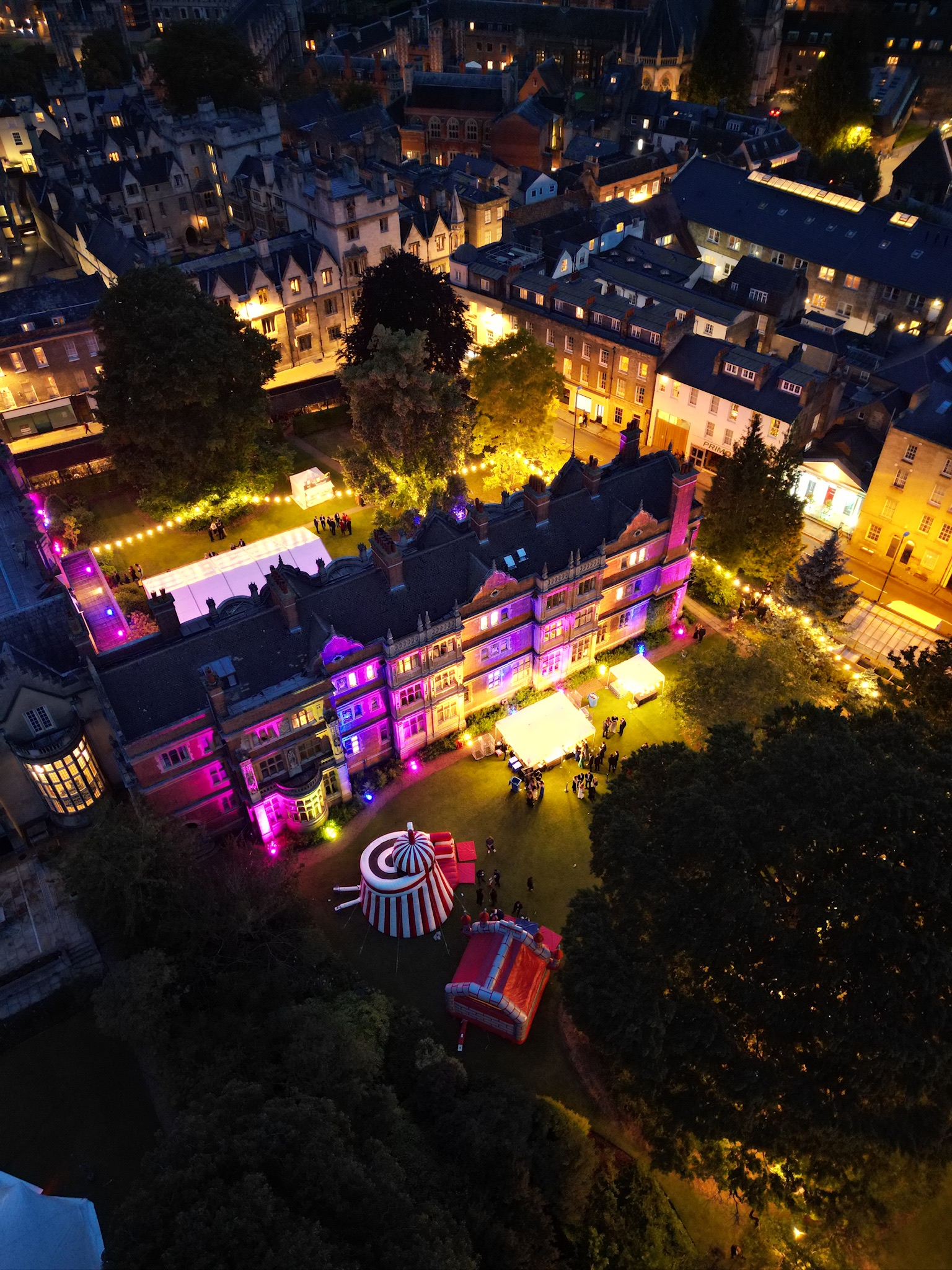
Sidney Sussex May Ball 2024

Sidney's first May Ball was in 1894 during Charles Smith's Mastership. In 2010, the Venice-themed May Ball garnered national press attention for its unique punting setup.

As with many of the smaller colleges, Sidney Sussex does not run a May Ball every year, instead running a biennial May Ball, on even-numbered years. On odd-numbered years, the college previously hosted an arts festival, which welcomed anyone in Cambridge to attend. Notable guest speakers at the Sidney Arts Festival have included Stephen Fry, in 2015. The college now hosts a June Event on odd-numbered years, which is an event which is shorter, smaller and cheaper to attend than a May Ball.

=== A Song of Sidney Sussex ===
At the beginning of the 20th century, Ernest Howard Griffiths, a fellow of Sidney Sussex College in 1897 wrote a ten verse song dedicated to Sidney Sussex. Each verse systematically identifies, then dismisses other Cambridge colleges for their faults, before settling on Sidney as the best college of all. The chorus exhorts the audience:

'Go travel round the town, my friend, whichever way you please,
From Downing up to Trinity, from Peterhouse to Caius:
Then seek a little College just beside a busy street,
Its name is Sidney Sussex, and you'll find it Bad to Beat.'

== People associated with Sidney ==
Oliver Cromwell, who matriculated in 1616 but did not graduate, spent his formative years at the college, where Puritan influences helped shape his religious and political beliefs. These convictions later played a key role in the English Civil War and his tenure as Lord Protector of England. His time at Sidney is often cited as instrumental in shaping his religious and political convictions. Oliver Cromwell's head was interred in 1960 in a secret location near the antechapel.

Sir Benjamin Lockspeiser, the first president of CERN was also an undergraduate at the college, along with psychiatrist W. Ross Ashby. Robert McCance, professor of experimental medicine, played a leading part in wartime rationing and 1940s government nutrition efforts. Dame Ann Dowling has been a fellow since 1977 and is president of the Royal Academy of Engineering. Sue Gibson, the inaugural recipient of the Rosalind Franklin award, was an undergraduate at the college. The "father of radio astronomy in Australia," Joe Pawsey, obtained his doctorate at Sidney Sussex in 1935.

Other prominent alumni include theologian and philosopher William Wollaston and historian Thomas Fuller. In politics, the college has educated David Owen, former leader of the Social Democratic Party and Foreign Secretary, as well as Chris Grayling and David Lidington, both former UK Cabinet ministers.

Several Sidney Sussex members contributed to codebreaking efforts at Bletchley Park during World War II, notably Gordon Welchman, a key figure in the development of codebreaking techniques, and John Herivel, known for the "Herivel Tip," which aided Enigma codebreaking. Howard Smith, later head of MI5, was also among them.

Among its cultural alumni, the college counts film director John Madden, television host and mathematician Carol Vorderman, and comedian Alex Horne. In business, Daniel Levy, chairman of Tottenham Hotspur, is a notable graduate.

Oliver Cromwell, Lord Protector of the Commonwealth

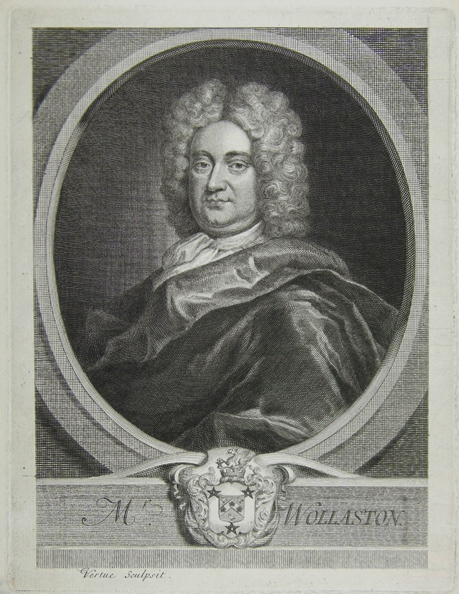
William Wollaston, philosopher

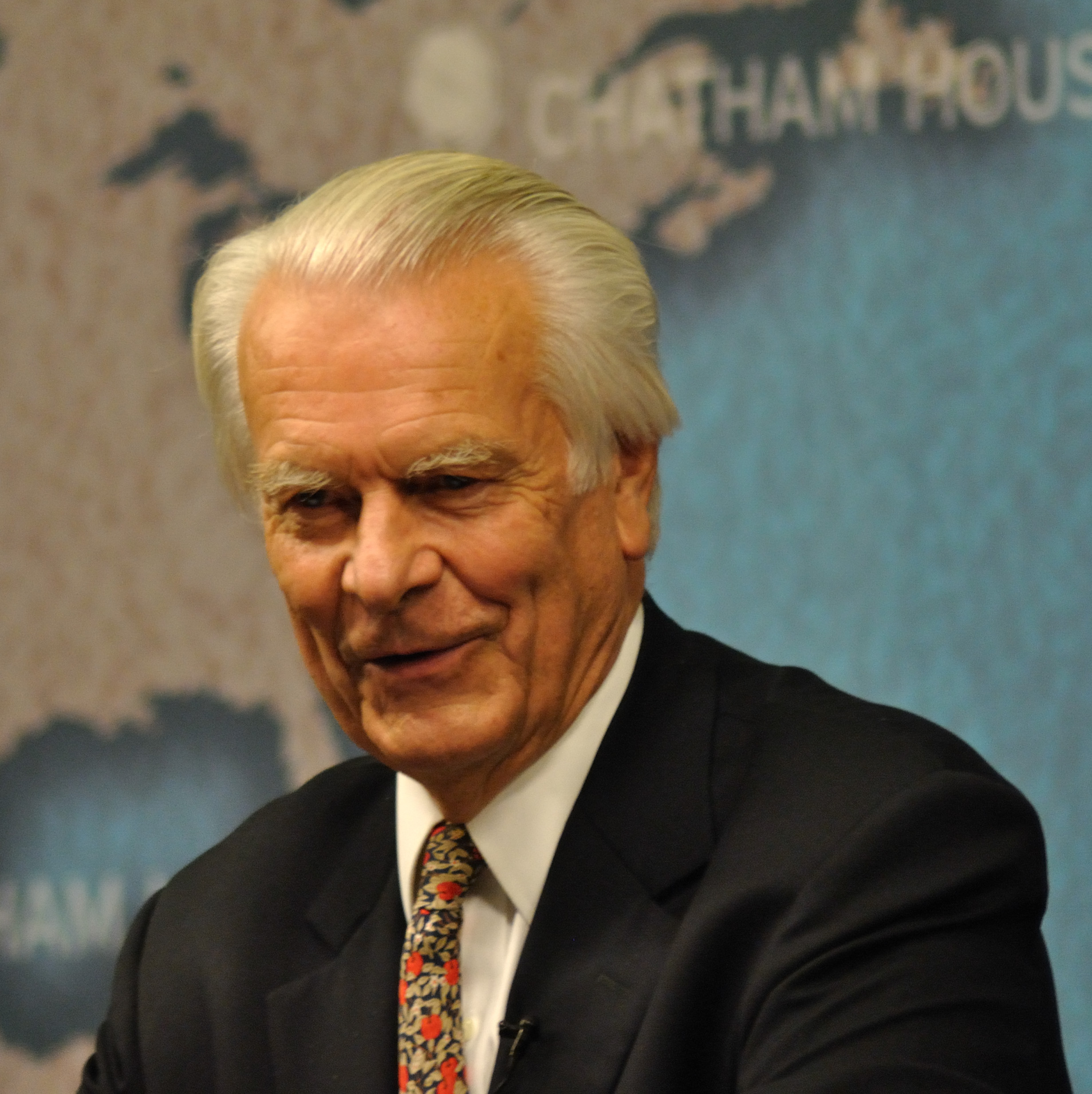
David Owen, politician

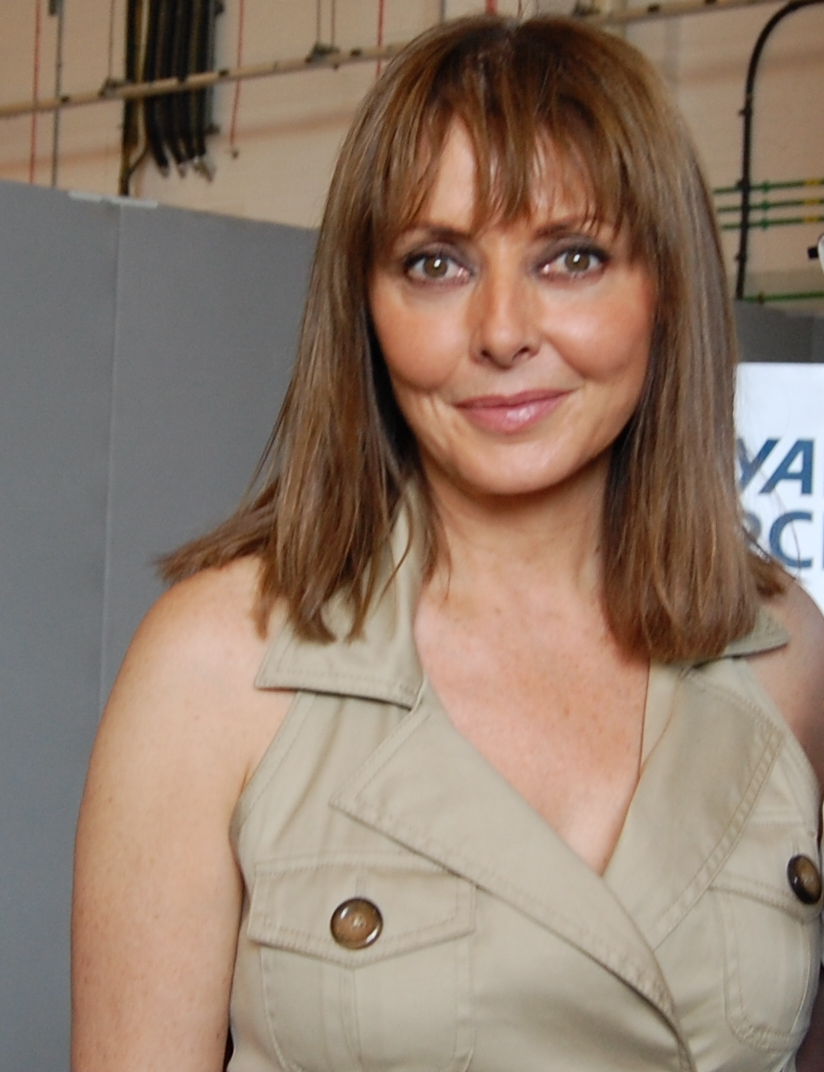
Carol Vorderman, media personality

=== List of notable alumni ===
Name	Birth	Death	Career
Sir Thomas Adams, 1st Baronet	1586	1667/8	Lord Mayor of London
John Wheelwright	1592	1679	New World Puritan clergyman
John Bramhall	1594	1663	Archbishop, theologian, philosopher
Thomas May	c. 1595	1650	Renaissance dramatist
Oliver Cromwell	1599	1658	Lord Protector
William Du Gard	1602	1662	Printer
William Wollaston	1659	1724	Philosopher
Thomas Woolston	1668	1733	Philosopher & theologian
John Gay	1699	1745	Philosopher
Francis Sawyer Parris	1707	1760	Editor, King James Bible
C.T.R. Wilson	1869	1959	Nobel Laureate in Physics
Ben Lockspeiser	1891	1990	President of CERN
William Ross Ashby	1903	1972	Cybernetics pioneer
Cecil Frank Powell	1903	1969	Nobel Laureate in Physics
Gordon Newton	1907	1998	Editor, Financial Times
Conrad Hal Waddington	1905	1975	Biologist
Charles Thurstan Shaw	1914	2013	Archaeologist
John Herivel	1918	2011	Bletchley Park cryptanalyst, science historian
Ronald N. Bracewell	1921	2007	Physicist
Asa Briggs	1921	2016	Historian
Alan MacDiarmid	1927	2007	Nobel Laureate in Chemistry
Michael Pitman	1933	2000	Chief Scientist of Australia
Dick Heckstall-Smith	1934	2004	Musician
David Owen	1938		Politician who served as Foreign Secretary
John E. Walker	1941		Nobel Laureate in Chemistry
Tony Badger	1947		Paul Mellon Professor of American History at Cambridge, Master of Clare College, Cambridge
John Madden	1949		Director
Steven Pimlott	1953	2007	Opera and theatre director
David Lidington	1956		Minister of State
Stuart Corbridge	1957		Vice-Chancellor of Durham University
Ann Copestake	1959		Professor of Computational Linguistics, University of Cambridge
Tsitsi Dangarembga	1959		Novelist, playwright and filmmaker
Stephen Kós	1959		New Zealand Supreme Court Judge
Brian Lenihan Jnr	1959	2011	Irish Minister for Finance
Ann Mather	1960		Executive. Has served on boards of Google and Pixar (Finance Director)
Carol Vorderman	1960		Media personality
Karan Bilimoria	1961		Businessman, Chairman of Cobra Beer, Chancellor of the University of Birmingham
Sarah Falk	1962		Judge
Daniel Levy	1962		Chairman of Tottenham Hotspur
Paddy Lowe	1962		Executive Director, Mercedes Grand Prix
Andrew Rawnsley	1962		Author, broadcaster and journalist
Ingrid Simler	1963		Judge
Chaim (Harvey) Hames	1966		Professor of history and Rector at Ben-Gurion University of the Negev
Joanna Marsh	1970		Composer
Lawrence Booth	1975		Editor of Wisden Cricketers' Almanack
Alex Horne	1978		Comedian
Rachel Horne			Newsreader and journalist

== See also ==
- List of non-ecclesiastical works by J. L. Pearson
