= Andrew Downes =

Andrew Downes or Downs may refer to:

- Andrew Downes (composer) (1950–2023), British classical composer
- Andrew Downes (scholar) (c. 1549–1628), also known as Dounaeus, English classical scholar
- Andrew Downs (naturalist) (1811–1892), American-born Canadian naturalist, ornithologist, zoologist, and taxidermist
