= John Bois =

English priest and scholar

John Bois (sometimes spelled Boys or "Boyse") (5 January 1560 – 14 January 1643) was an English scholar, remembered mainly as one of the members of the translating committee for the Authorized Version of the Bible.

== Life ==
Bois was born in Nettlestead, Suffolk, England, His father was William Bois, a graduate of Michaelhouse, Cambridge and a Protestant converted by Martin Bucer, who was vicar of Elmsett and West Stow; his mother was Mirable Poolye.

His father took great care about his education, and already at the age of five years John could read the Bible in Hebrew. He was sent to school at Hadleigh, then went to St John's College, Cambridge, in 1575 when he was 15 years old. He was taught by Henry Copinger, and soon was proficient in Greek. He intended medicine as a profession, but its study brought on hypochondria. His mentor and Greek teacher at St John's was Andrew Downes.

In 1580 Bois was elected Fellow of his college, while suffering from smallpox. On 21 June 1583 he was ordained a deacon of the Church of England, by Edmund Freake. For ten years, he was Greek lecturer in his college.

When he was about thirty-six years old, on 13 October 1596, he married the daughter of Francis Holt, rector at Boxworth, after the death of her father, and he took over this post. Serious financial troubles followed, and he had to sell his library; his scholarly reputation brought him tasks, but they were poorly rewarded. In 1609 he succeeded John Duport as prebendary of Ely while also serving as rector of Boxworth. He spent the last years of his life there. He was eighty-three when he died in Ely. He had four sons and three daughters, none of whom survived their father. His wife died two years before him.

== Works ==
He assisted Henry Savile with the translation of the works of John Chrysostom.

In 1604 he was recruited for one of the Cambridge committees set up to translate the Bible into English. He also served in the "Second Cambridge Company" charged by James I of England with translating the Apocrypha for the King James Version of the Bible. As well as his own work, he assisted in the work of the "First Cambridge Company" translating from Chronicles to Canticles. Six years later, when the work was done, the different translations were reviewed by six scholars for the final publication. Bois was one of their number. The Bible was then published in 1611.

Scholarly notes he made on the Latin Vulgate survived and were later printed. The renderings of the Vulgate are in the main defended, but Bois frequently proposes more exact translations of his own.
