= William Thorne (orientalist) =

William Thorne (1568? – 1630) was an English clergyman and orientalist, Regius Professor of Hebrew at Oxford in 1598.

== Life ==
He was born at Semley, Wiltshire, in 1568 or 1569, entered Winchester College in 1582. Proceeding to New College, Oxford, he matriculated on 15 April 1586, and was elected a fellow in the year following. He graduated B.A. on 12 April 1589, M.A. on 18 Jan. 1593, B.D. on 16 July 1600, and D.D. on 8 July 1602.

On 12 March 1597 he was licensed to preach, and from 27 July 1598 until 1604 he filled the office of Regius Professor of Hebrew. On 30 December 1601 he was installed dean of Chichester, and in the same year received the rectory of Tollard Royal, Wiltshire, resigning his fellowship in 1602. In 1606 he was appointed vicar of Amport, Hampshire; in 1607 a canon of Chichester and rector of Birdham, Sussex. In 1616 he became rector of North Marden, Sussex, and in 1619 of Warblington, Hampshire. He died on 13 February 1630, and was buried in Chichester Cathedral.

Thorne was a Hebraist and oriental scholar with an international reputation. John Drusius dedicated to him Opuscula quae ad Grammaticam spectant (1609), and Charles Fitzgeffrey devotes an epigram to him in his Affaniae sive Epigrammatum libri tres (1601). He is sometimes cited as a member of the First Oxford Company of Bible translators working on the Authorized King James Version; and yet despite contemporary evidence that he was involved with the project, there is some doubt still expressed about his participation with the seven others of the Company.

The doubt concerning his involvement in the translation apparently stems from the fact that he is not mentioned in the earliest lists of translators. The evidence in support of his involvement, however, is substantial. More than a dozen bishops signed a document (c. 1605) recommending Thorne for ecclesiastical preferment. The recommendation explicitly mentions Thorne's involvement as a translator "of that parte of the olde Testament which is committed to that Universitie" (i.e., Oxford). The recommendation also states that Thorne was the King's chaplain. At least two of the signatories were themselves involved in the translation project. It seems unlikely that these men would have signed the document as worded if Thorne had not been involved in the translation. Moreover, it is entirely plausible that the former regius professor of Hebrew at Oxford and the King's chaplain would have been involved in the project. Thorne was a member of John Case's circle, which included several of the Oxford translators. One of them, Ralph Ravens, was omitted from some of the early lists, but was "certainly involved." Matthew DeCoursey suggests that Thorne may have joined the project late.

== Works ==
Thorne was the author of:

- Willelmi Thorni Tullius, seu ῥήτωρ, in tria stromata divisus, Oxford, 1592.
- Ἔσοπτρον Βασιλικόν. Or a Kenning-Glasse for a Christian King. Dedicated to James I, London, 1603.
