= Thomas Harrison (translator) =

English Puritan scholar (1555–1631)

Thomas Harrison (1555, London – 1631) was an English Puritan scholar, a Vice-Master of Trinity College, Cambridge, and one of the translators for the King James Version of the Bible.

== Life ==
He was born in London, and entered Merchant Taylors' School in 1570; he entered Trinity College, Cambridge, in 1573 and graduated B.A. in 1577. At Cambridge his scholarship attracted the notice of William Whitaker. He became a Fellow and tutor of Trinity College.

Harrison was a Puritan, and in 1589 is mentioned as attending a synod at St. John's College, along with Thomas Cartwright. He was a noted Christian Hebraist and among the revisers of the King James Bible. He belonged to the First Cambridge Company. For the last twenty years of his life he was vice-prefect of Trinity College.

He died in 1631 and was buried with some pomp in the chapel of his college. A Latin volume in his honour was written by Caleb Dalechamp (Dalecampius) and dedicated to John Bois; it is titled Harrisonus Honoratus: Id est Honorifica de Vita, &c. (Cambridge, 1632), and contains a meagre outline of his life in the form of a funeral oration, with some Latin verses to his memory.

== Notes ==
Attribution

- This article incorporates text from a publication now in the public domain: "Harrison, Thomas (1555-1631)". Dictionary of National Biography. London: Smith, Elder & Co. 1885–1900.
