= Robert Ward (scholar) =

English Scholar

Robert Ward was an English scholar, a fellow of King's College, Cambridge and prebendary of Chichester Cathedral. He served in the "Second Cambridge Company" charged by James I of England with translating the Apocrypha for the King James Version of the Bible.
