= Francis Burleigh =

Francis Burleigh, sometimes spelled Burghley, was born in London around 1552. He studied at St. Catharine's College, Cambridge, then Queens' College, Cambridge, and finally Pembroke College, Cambridge. "He graduated B.A. in 1583, proceeded M.A. in 1587 and B.D. in 1594. He eventually became doctor of divinity in 1607 shortly after he had commenced his work on the translation" (http://kingjamesbibletranslators.org/bios/Francis_Burley/).

He was an English Vicar, appointed in 1590 to Bishop's Stortford by Lancelot Andrewes. He was among Andrewes' "First Westminster Company", charged by James I of England with the translation of the first 12 books of the King James Version of the Bible.
