= Jeremiah Radcliffe =

English priest, scholar and translator

Jeremiah Radcliffe (died 1612) was an English priest, scholar and translator.

Radcliffe was educated at Westminster School and Trinity College, Cambridge. He became a Fellow of Trinity in 1572. He served as Vicar of Evesham from 1588 and Rector of Orwell, Cambridgeshire from 1590. From 1597 to 1611 he was Vice-Master of Trinity College. He also served in the "Second Cambridge Company" charged by James I of England with translating the Apocrypha for the King James Version of the Bible.
