= King James Version =

1611 English translation of the Bible

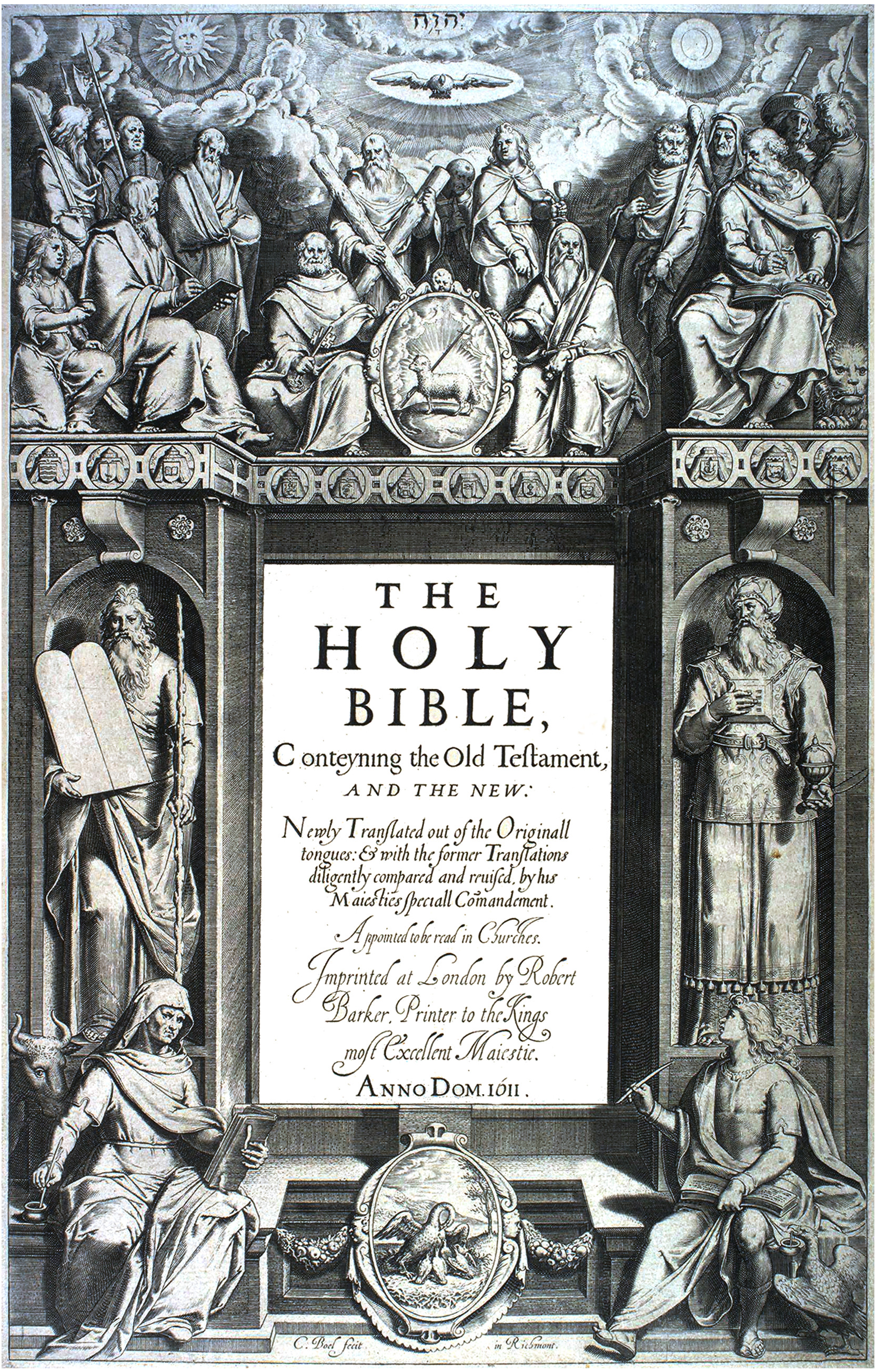
- The title page to the 1611 first edition of the authorised version of the Bible by Cornelis Boel shows the Apostles Peter and Paul seated centrally above the central text, which is flanked by Moses and Aaron. In the four corners sit Matthew, Mark, Luke and John, the traditionally attributed authors of the four gospels, with their symbolic animals. The rest of the Apostles (with Judas facing away) stand around Peter and Paul. At the very top is the Tetragrammaton "יְהֹוָה" written with niqqud.
- Abbreviation: KJV (Note: The King James Version can also be found abbreviated as either the KJB (King James Bible) or the AV (Authorised Version).)
- Complete Bible published: 1611
- Online as: King James Version at Wikisource
- Textual basis: OT: Masoretic Text; Apocrypha: Septuagint and Vulgate; NT: Textus Receptus
- Translation type: Formal equivalence
- Version revision: 1769
- Copyright: Perpetually copyrighted in UK; De facto public domain elsewhere (Note: The King James Version has publication restrictions in the United Kingdom - see the section regarding copyright status.)
- Religious affiliation: Anglican; Presbyterianism (Note: The King James Version has also been used throughout a multitude of Protestant denominations since its original publication. In addition, it has been used by various sects.)
- Genesis 1:1–3 In the beginning God created the heaven and the earth. And the earth was without form, and void; and darkness was upon the face of the deep. And the Spirit of God moved upon the face of the waters. And God said, Let there be light: and there was light. John 3:16 For God so loved the world, that he gave his only begotten Son, that whosoever believeth in him should not perish, but have everlasting life.

The King James Bible, more commonly known as the King James Version (KJV) and the Authorized Version, is an Early Modern English translation of the Christian Bible for the Church of England and Church of Scotland, which was commissioned in 1604 and published in 1611, by sponsorship of King James VI and I. (Note: "And now at last, ... it being brought unto such a conclusion, as that we have great hope that the Church of England shall reape good fruit thereby ...") The 80 books of the KJV include 39 books of the Old Testament, 14 books of Apocrypha, and the 27 books of the New Testament.

The KJV does not include a commentary on the text as the King believed that might contain anti-monarchist sentiment as had its predecessor the Geneva Bible.

Noted for its "majesty of style," the KJV has remained in continuous use for over four centuries, exerting more influence on English literature and Christian thought than any other English Bible translation. Its phrasing has been credited with shaping not only hymnody and liturgy, but also the idioms of everyday speech used in the English-speaking world. It is considered one of the important literary accomplishments of early modern England. The original KJV is a 17th-century translation and thus contains a large number of archaisms and false friends - words that contemporary readers may think they understand but that actually carry obsolete or unfamiliar meanings - making understanding the text difficult for modern readers, even pastors and preachers trained in formal theological institutes. While the 1611 text reflects Early Modern English usage, subsequent standardisations—most notably the 1769 Oxford edition and the more recent 1900 Pure Cambridge Edition—have made the KJV considerably more accessible to later generations. Many scholars note that its sentence structure is often clearer and more direct than some modern versions, despite occasional obsolete vocabulary.

The King James Version was the third translation into English approved by the Church of England. The first had been the Great Bible in 1535, and the second had been the Bishops' Bible in 1568. Meanwhile in Switzerland, the first generation of Protestant Reformers had produced the Geneva Bible in 1560, which proved more popular among the laity. However, the footnotes represented a Calvinistic Puritanism.

King James convened the Hampton Court Conference in January 1604, responding to Puritan grievances outlined in the Millenary Petition. At this conference, a proposal for a new English translation of the Bible was presented, aiming to address perceived issues in existing versions. King James issued directives to ensure the translation adhered to the ecclesiology of the Church of England, reflecting its episcopal structure and doctrines, including the belief in an ordained clergy. Notably, translators were instructed to avoid marginal notes whenever possible, a feature in the Geneva Bible that had been criticised for promoting Puritanical and anti-monarchical sentiments. For the New Testament, the Textus Receptus was utilized; the Old Testament was revised from the Bishop's Bible with reference to the Masoretic Text; and the Apocrypha was rendered from the Septuagint and Latin Vulgate.

By the first half of the 18th century, the King James Version had become effectively unchallenged as the only English translation used in Anglican and other English Protestant churches, except for the Psalms and some short passages in the Book of Common Prayer of the Church of England. Over the 18th century, the KJV supplanted the Latin Vulgate as the standard version of scripture for English-speaking scholars. With the development of stereotype printing at the beginning of the 19th century, this version of the Bible had become the most widely printed book in history, almost all such printings presenting the standard text of 1769, and nearly always omitting the books of the Apocrypha. Today the unqualified title "King James Version" usually indicates this Oxford standard text.

In surveys of English-speaking Christians, the KJV frequently ranks among the most read and memorised translations, with one publisher citing its linguistic beauty and imagery as reasons for its continued preference.

== Name ==
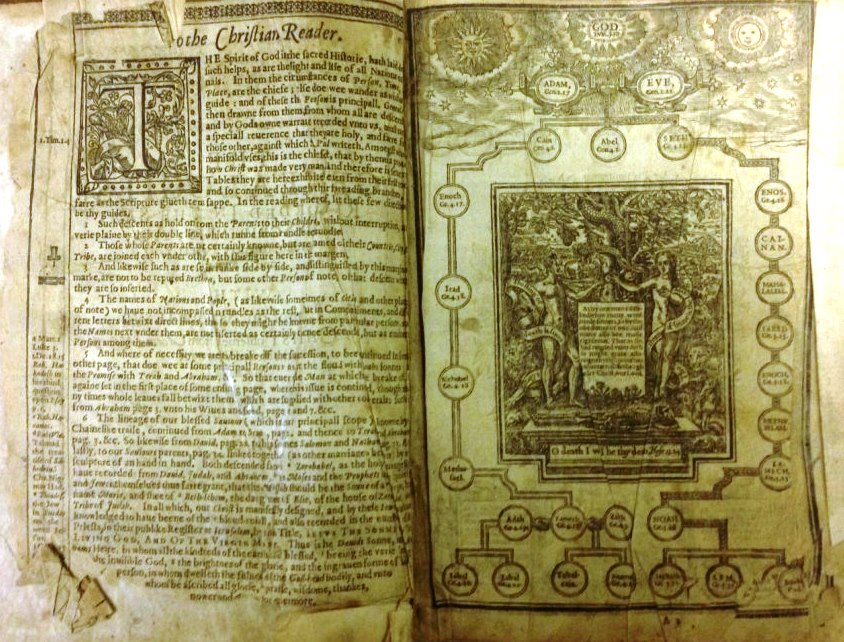
John Speed's Genealogies recorded in the Sacred Scriptures (1611), bound into first King James Bible in quarto size (1612)

The title of the first edition of the translation, in Early Modern English, was "THE HOLY BIBLE, Conteyning the Old Teſtament, AND THE NEW: Newly Tranſlated out of the Originall tongues: & with former Tranſlations diligently compared and reuiſed, by his Majesties ſpeciall Comandement." Underneath the title, it is written that the Bible is "[a]ppointed to be read in Churches." Biblical scholar F. F. Bruce suggests it was "probably authorised by order in council," but no record of the authorization survives "because the Privy Council registers from 1600 to 1613 were destroyed by fire in January 1618/19."

For many years it was common not to give the translation any specific name. In his Leviathan of 1651, Thomas Hobbes referred to it as "the English Translation made in the beginning of the Reign of King James." A 1761 "Brief Account of the various Translations of the Bible into English" refers to the 1611 version merely as "a new, compleat, and more accurate Translation," despite referring to the Great Bible by its name, and despite using the name "Rhemish Testament" for the Douay–Rheims Bible version. Similarly, a "History of England," whose fifth edition was published in 1775, writes merely that "[a] new translation of the Bible, viz., that now in Use, was begun in 1607, and published in 1611."

King James's Bible is used as the name for the 1611 translation (on a par with the Genevan Bible or the Rhemish Testament) in Charles Butler's Horae Biblicae (first published 1797). Other works from the early 19th century confirm the widespread use of this name on both sides of the Atlantic: it is found both in a "historical sketch of the English translations of the Bible" published in Massachusetts in 1815 and in an English publication from 1818, which explicitly states that the 1611 version is "generally known by the name of King James's Bible". This name was also found as King James' Bible (without the final "s"): for example in a book review from 1811. The phrase "King James's Bible" is used as far back as 1715, although in this case it is not clear whether this is a name or merely a description.

The use of Authorized Version, capitalized and used as a name, is found as early as 1814. For some time before this, descriptive phrases such as "our present, and only publicly authorised version" (1783), "our Authorized version" (1731, 1792) and "the authorized version" (1801, uncapitalized) are found. A more common appellation in the 17th and 18th centuries was "our English translation" or "our English version", as can be seen by searching one or other of the major online archives of printed books. In Britain, the 1611 translation is generally known as the "Authorised Version" today.

King James' Version, evidently a descriptive phrase, is found being used as early as 1814. "The King James Version" is found, unequivocally used as a name, in a letter from 1855. The next year, the King James Bible, with no possessive, appears as a name in a Scottish source. In the United States, the "1611 translation" (actually editions following the standard text of 1769, see below) is generally known as the King James Version today.

== History ==
=== Earlier English translations ===
There were several translations into Middle English of large portions of Scriptures in the 14th Century, with the first English complete bibles probably being made by the followers of John Wycliffe. These translations were effectively but not formally banned in 1409 due to their association with the Lollards. The Wycliffite Bibles pre-dated the printing press but were circulated very widely in manuscript form.

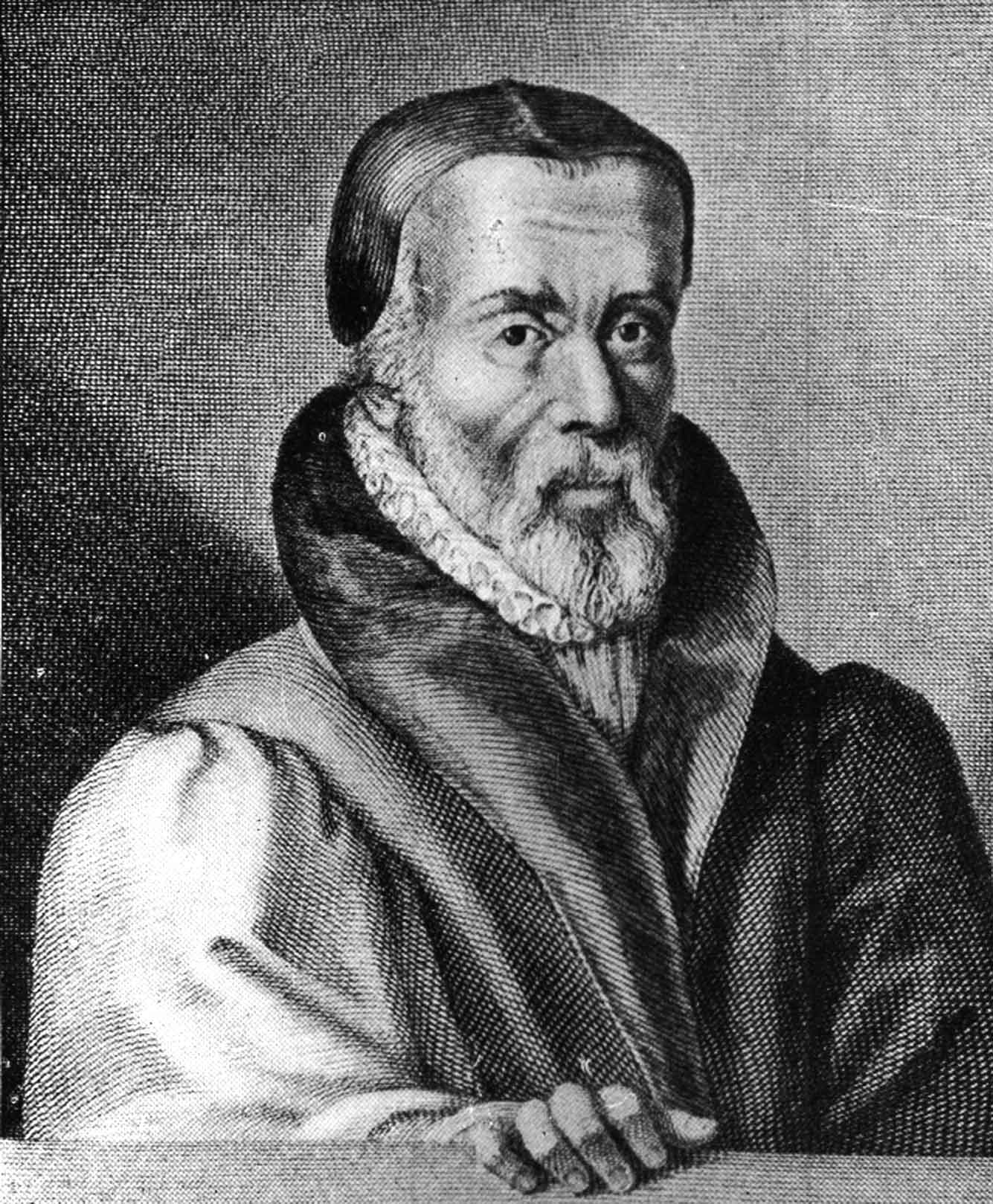
William Tyndale translated the New Testament into English in 1525.

In 1525, William Tyndale, an English contemporary of Martin Luther, undertook a translation of the New Testament into Early Modern English. Tyndale's translation was the first printed Bible in English. Over the next ten years, Tyndale revised his New Testament in the light of rapidly advancing biblical scholarship, and embarked on a translation of the Old Testament. Despite some controversial translation choices, and in spite of Tyndale's execution on charges of heresy for being a Lutheran, the merits of Tyndale's work and prose style made his translation the ultimate basis for all subsequent renditions into Early Modern English.

With these translations lightly edited and adapted by Myles Coverdale to remove offensive notes, in 1539, Tyndale's New Testament and his incomplete work on the Old Testament became the basis for the Great Bible. This was the first "authorised version" issued by the Church of England during the reign of King Henry VIII. When Mary I succeeded to the throne in 1553, she returned the Church of England to the communion of the Catholic faith and many English religious reformers fled the country, some establishing an English-speaking community in the Protestant city of Geneva. Under the leadership of John Calvin, Geneva became the chief international centre of Reformed Protestantism and Latin biblical scholarship.

These English expatriates undertook a translation that became known as the Geneva Bible. This translation, dated to 1560, was a revision of Tyndale's Bible and the Great Bible on the basis of the original languages. Soon after Elizabeth I took the throne in 1558, problems with both the Great and Geneva Bibles (namely, that the latter did not "conform to the ecclesiology and reflect the episcopal structure of the Church of England and its beliefs about an ordained clergy") became apparent to church authorities. In 1568, the Church of England responded with the Bishops' Bible, a revision of the Great Bible in the light of the Geneva version.

While officially approved, this new version failed to displace the Geneva translation as the most popular English Bible of the age, in part because the full Bible was printed only in lectern editions of prodigious size and at a cost of several pounds. Accordingly, Elizabethan lay people overwhelmingly read the Bible in the Geneva Version, as small editions were available at a relatively low cost. At the same time, there was a substantial clandestine importation of the rival Douay–Rheims New Testament of 1582, undertaken by exiled Catholics. This translation, though still derived from Tyndale, claimed to represent the text of the Latin Vulgate.

In May 1601, King James VI of Scotland attended the General Assembly of the Church of Scotland at Saint Columba's Church in Burntisland, Fife, at which proposals were put forward for a new translation of the Bible into English. Two years later, he ascended to the throne of England as James I.

=== Considerations for a new version ===
The newly crowned King James convened the Hampton Court Conference in 1604. That gathering proposed a new English version in response to the perceived problems of earlier translations as detected by the Puritan faction of the Church of England. Here are three examples of problems the Puritans perceived with the Bishops and Great Bibles:

First, Galatians iv. 25 (from the Bishops' Bible). The Greek word susoichei is not well translated as now it is, bordereth neither expressing the force of the word, nor the apostle's sense, nor the situation of the place. Secondly, psalm cv. 28 (from the Great Bible), 'They were not obedient;' the original being, 'They were not disobedient.' Thirdly, psalm cvi. 30 (also from the Great Bible), 'Then stood up Phinees and prayed,' the Hebrew hath, 'executed judgment.'

Instructions were given to the translators that were intended to use formal equivalence and limit the Puritan influence on this new translation. The Bishop of London added a qualification that the translators would add no marginal notes (which had been an issue in the Geneva Bible). King James cited two passages in the Geneva translation where he found the marginal notes offensive to the principles of divinely ordained royal supremacy: Exodus 1:19, where the Geneva Bible notes had commended the example of civil disobedience to the Egyptian Pharaoh showed by the Hebrew midwives, and also II Chronicles 15:16, where the Geneva Bible had criticised King Asa for not having executed his idolatrous 'mother', Queen Maachah (Maachah had actually been Asa's grandmother, but James considered the Geneva Bible reference as sanctioning the execution of his own mother Mary, Queen of Scots).

Further, the King gave the translators instructions designed to guarantee that the new version would conform to the ecclesiology of the Church of England. Certain Greek and Hebrew words were to be translated in a manner that reflected the traditional usage of the church. For example, old ecclesiastical words such as the word "church" were to be retained and not to be translated as "congregation". The new translation would reflect the episcopal structure of the Church of England and traditional beliefs about ordained clergy.

The source material for the translation of the New Testament was the Textus Receptus version of the Greek compiled by Erasmus; for the Old Testament, the Masoretic text of the Hebrew was used; for some of the apocrypha, the Septuagint Greek text was used, or for apocrypha for which the Greek was unavailable, the Vulgate Latin.

James' instructions included several requirements that kept the new translation familiar to its listeners and readers. The text of the Bishops' Bible would serve as the primary guide for the translators, and the familiar proper names of the biblical characters would all be retained. If the Bishops' Bible was deemed problematic in any situation, the translators were permitted to consult other translations from a pre-approved list: the Tyndale Bible, the Coverdale Bible, Matthew's Bible, the Great Bible, and the Geneva Bible. In addition, later scholars have detected an influence on the Authorized Version from the translations of Taverner's Bible and the New Testament of the Douay–Rheims Bible. A recent estimate is that 84% of the New Testament in the KJV is word-for-word identical to the Tyndale Bible, and about 76% of Tyndale's incomplete Old Testament is in the KJV.

It is for this reason that the flyleaf of most printings of the Authorized Version observes that the text had been "translated out of the original tongues, and with the former translations diligently compared and revised, by His Majesty's special commandment." As the work proceeded, more detailed rules were adopted as to how variant and uncertain readings in the Hebrew and Greek source texts should be indicated, including the requirement that words supplied in English to 'complete the meaning' of the originals should be printed in a different type face.

=== Translation committees ===
The task of translation was undertaken by 47 scholars, although 54 were originally approved. All were members of the Church of England and all except Sir Henry Savile were clergy. The scholars worked in six committees, two based in each of the University of Oxford, the University of Cambridge, and Westminster. The committees included scholars with Puritan sympathies, as well as high churchmen. Forty unbound copies of the 1602 edition of the Bishops' Bible were specially printed so that the agreed changes of each committee could be recorded in the margins.

The committees worked on certain parts separately and the drafts produced by each committee were then compared and revised for harmony with each other. The scholars were not paid directly for their translation work. Instead, a circular letter was sent to bishops encouraging them to consider the translators for appointment to well-paid livings as these fell vacant. Several were supported by the various colleges at Oxford and Cambridge, while others were promoted to bishoprics, deaneries and prebends through royal patronage.

On 22 July 1604 King James VI and I sent a letter to Archbishop Bancroft asking him to contact all English churchmen requesting that they make donations to his project.

Right trusty and well beloved, we greet you well. Whereas we have appointed certain learned men, to the number of 4 and 50, for the translating of the Bible, and in this number, divers of them have either no ecclesiastical preferment at all, or else so very small, as the same is far unmeet for men of their deserts and yet we in ourself in any convenient time cannot well remedy it, therefor we do hereby require you, that presently you write in our name as well to the Archbishop of York, as to the rest of the bishops of the province of Cant.[erbury] signifying unto them, that we do well and straitly charge everyone of them ... that (all excuses set apart) when a prebend or parsonage ... shall next upon any occasion happen to be void ... we may commend for the same some such of the learned men, as we shall think fit to be preferred unto it ... Given unto our signet at our palace of West.[minister] on 2 and 20 July, in the 2nd year of our reign of England, France, and of Ireland, and of Scotland xxxvii.

The six committees started work towards the end of 1604. The Apocrypha committee finished first, and all six completed their sections by 1608. From January 1609, a General Committee of Review met at Stationers' Hall, London to review the completed marked texts from each of the committees, and were paid for their attendance by the Stationers' Company. The General Committee included John Bois, Andrew Downes, John Harmar, and others known only by their initials, including "AL" (who may be Arthur Lake). John Bois prepared a note of their deliberations (in Latin) – which has partly survived in two later transcripts. Also surviving of the translators' working papers are a bound set of marked-up corrections to one of the forty Bishops' Bibles – covering the Old Testament and Gospels; and also a manuscript translation of the text of the Epistles, excepting those verses where no change was being recommended to the readings in the Bishops' Bible. Archbishop Bancroft insisted on having a final say making fourteen further changes, of which one was the term "bishopricke" at Acts 1:20.

Committee	Scriptures translated	Members
First Westminster Company	Genesis to 2 Kings	Lancelot Andrewes, John Overall, Hadrian à Saravia, Richard Clarke, John Layfield, Robert Tighe, Francis Burleigh, Geoffrey King, Richard Thomson, William Bedwell;
First Cambridge Company	1 Chronicles to the Song of Solomon	Edward Lively, John Richardson, Lawrence Chaderton, Francis Dillingham, Roger Andrewes, Thomas Harrison, Robert Spaulding, Andrew Bing
First Oxford Company	Isaiah to Malachi	John Harding, John Rainolds (or Reynolds), Thomas Holland, Richard Kilby, Miles Smith, Richard Brett, Daniel Fairclough, William Thorne
Second Oxford Company	Gospels, Acts of the Apostles, Book of Revelation	Thomas Ravis, George Abbot, Richard Eedes, Giles Tomson, Sir Henry Savile, John Peryn, Ralph Ravens, John Harmar, John Aglionby, Leonard Hutten
Second Westminster Company	Epistles	William Barlow, John Spenser, Roger Fenton, Ralph Hutchinson, William Dakins, Michael Rabbet, Thomas Sanderson (who probably had already become Archdeacon of Rochester)
Second Cambridge Company	Apocrypha	John Duport, William Branthwaite, Jeremiah Radcliffe, Samuel Ward, Andrew Downes, John Bois, Robert Ward, Thomas Bilson, Richard Bancroft.

=== Printing ===
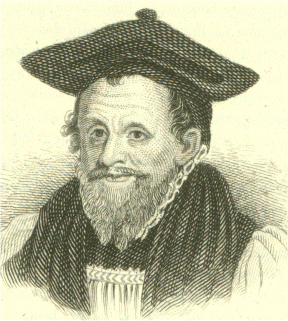
Archbishop Richard Bancroft was the "chief overseer" of the production of the Authorized Version.

The original printing of the Authorised Version was published by Robert Barker, the King's Printer, in 1611 as a complete folio Bible. It was sold looseleaf for ten shillings, or bound for twelve. Robert Barker's father, Christopher, had, in 1589, been granted by Elizabeth I the title of royal Printer, with the perpetual Royal Privilege to print Bibles in England. (Note: The Royal Privilege was a virtual monopoly.) Robert Barker invested very large sums in printing the new edition, and consequently ran into serious debt, such that he was compelled to sub-lease the privilege to two rival London printers, Bonham Norton and John Bill. It appears that it was initially intended that each printer would print a portion of the text, share printed sheets with the others, and split the proceeds. Bitter financial disputes broke out, as Barker accused Norton and Bill of concealing their profits, while Norton and Bill accused Barker of selling sheets properly due to them as partial Bibles for ready money. There followed decades of continual litigation, and consequent imprisonment for debt for members of the Barker and Norton printing dynasties, while each issued rival editions of the whole Bible. In 1629 the Universities of Oxford and Cambridge successfully managed to assert separate and prior royal licences for Bible printing, for their own university presses - and Cambridge University took the opportunity to print revised editions of the Authorised Version in 1629, and 1638. The editors of these editions included John Bois and Samuel Ward from the original translators. This did not, however, impede the commercial rivalries of the London printers, especially as the Barker family refused to allow any other printers access to the authoritative manuscript of the Authorised Version.

Two editions of the whole Bible are recognised as having been produced in 1611, which may be distinguished by their rendering of Ruth 3:15; the first edition reading "he went into the city", where the second reads "she went into the city"; these are known colloquially as the "He" and "She" Bibles.

The opening of the Epistle to the Hebrews of the 1611 edition of the Authorized Version shows the original typeface. The text of the Bible (only) is in black text. Marginal notes reference variant translations and cross references to other Bible passages. Each chapter is headed by a précis of contents. There are decorative initial letters for each chapter, and a decorated headpiece to each book, but no illustrations in the text.

The original printing was made before English spelling was standardised, and when printers, as a matter of course, expanded and contracted the spelling of the same words in different places, so as to achieve an even column of text. They set v for initial u and v, and u for u and v everywhere else. They used the long s (ſ) for non-final s.

As can be seen in the example page on the left, the first printing used a blackletter typeface instead of a roman typeface, which itself made a political and a religious statement. Like the Great Bible and the Bishops' Bible, the Authorised Version was "appointed to be read in churches". It was a large folio volume meant for public use, not private devotion; the weight of the type—blackletter type was heavy physically as well as visually—mirrored the weight of establishment authority behind it. However, smaller editions and roman-type editions followed rapidly, e.g. quarto roman-type editions of the Bible in 1612.

In the Great Bible, readings derived from the Vulgate but not found in published Hebrew and Greek texts had been distinguished by being printed in smaller roman type. In the Geneva Bible, a distinct typeface had instead been applied to distinguish text supplied by translators, or thought needful for English grammar but not present in the Greek or Hebrew; and the original printing of the Authorised Version used roman type for this purpose, albeit sparsely and inconsistently. This results in perhaps the most significant difference between the original printed text of the King James Bible and the current text. When, from the later 17th century onwards, the Authorised Version began to be printed in roman type, the typeface for supplied words was changed to italics, this application being regularised and greatly expanded. This was intended to de-emphasize the words.

So as to make it easier to know a particular passage, each chapter was headed by a brief précis of its contents with verse numbers. Later editors freely substituted their own chapter summaries, or omitted such material entirely. Pilcrow marks are used to indicate the beginnings of paragraphs except after the book of Acts. (Note: Norton 2011a, p. x notes: "In all likelihood, the first edition of the King James Bible was hurried through the press before the translators had fully completed their work. One of the casualties of this hurry was the paragraphing. It emerged rough and incomplete: for instance, there are no paragraph breaks marked in the New Testament after Acts 20.)

=== Authorised Version ===
The Authorised Version was meant to replace the Bishops' Bible as the official version for readings in the Church of England. No record of its authorisation exists; it was probably effected by an order of the Privy Council, but the records for the years 1600 to 1613 were destroyed by fire in January 1618/19, and it is commonly known as the Authorised Version in the United Kingdom. The King's Printer issued no further editions of the Bishops' Bible, so necessarily the Authorised Version replaced it as the standard lectern Bible in parish church use in England.

In the 1662 Book of Common Prayer, the text of the Authorised Version finally supplanted that of the Great Bible in the Epistle and Gospel readings—though the Prayer Book Psalter nevertheless continues in the Great Bible version.

The case was different in Scotland, where the Geneva Bible had long been the standard church Bible. It was not until 1633 that a Scottish edition of the Authorised Version was printed—in conjunction with the Scots coronation in that year of Charles I. The inclusion of illustrations in the edition raised accusations of Popery from opponents of the religious policies of Charles and William Laud, Archbishop of Canterbury. However, official policy favoured the Authorised Version, and this favour returned during the Commonwealth—as London printers succeeded in re-asserting their monopoly on Bible printing with support from Oliver Cromwell—and the "New Translation" was the only edition on the market. F. F. Bruce reports that the last recorded instance of a Scots parish continuing to use the "Old Translation" (i.e. Geneva) as being in 1674.

The Authorised Version's acceptance by the general public took longer. The Geneva Bible continued to be popular, and large numbers were imported from Amsterdam, where printing continued up to 1644 in editions carrying a false London imprint. However, few if any genuine Geneva editions appear to have been printed in London after 1616, and in 1637 Archbishop Laud prohibited their printing or importation. In the period of the English Civil War, soldiers of the New Model Army were issued a book of Geneva selections called "The Soldiers' Bible". In the first half of the 17th century the Authorised Version is most commonly referred to as "The Bible without notes", thereby distinguishing it from the Geneva "Bible with notes".

There were several printings of the Authorised Version in Amsterdam—one as late as 1715 which combined the Authorised Version translation text with the Geneva marginal notes; one such edition was printed in London in 1649. During the Commonwealth a commission was established by Parliament to recommend a revision of the Authorised Version with acceptably Protestant explanatory notes.

A small minority of critical scholars were slow to accept the latest translation. Hugh Broughton, who was the most highly regarded English Hebraist of his time but had been excluded from the panel of translators because of his utterly uncongenial temperament, issued in 1611 a total condemnation of the new version. He especially criticised the translators' rejection of word-for-word equivalence and stated that "he would rather be torn in pieces by wild horses than that this abominable translation (KJV) should ever be foisted upon the English people". Walton's London Polyglot of 1657 disregards the Authorised Version (and indeed the English language) entirely. Walton's reference text throughout is the Vulgate.

The Vulgate Latin is also found as the standard text of scripture in Thomas Hobbes's Leviathan of 1651. Hobbes gives Vulgate chapter and verse numbers (e.g., Job 41:24, not Job 41:33) for his head text. In Chapter 35: "The Signification in Scripture of Kingdom of God", Hobbes discusses Exodus 19:5, first in his own translation of the Vulgar Latin, and then subsequently as found in the versions he terms "... the English translation made in the beginning of the reign of King James", and "The Geneva French" (i.e. Olivétan). Hobbes advances detailed critical arguments why the Vulgate rendering is to be preferred. For most of the 17th century the assumption remained that, while it had been of vital importance to provide the scriptures in the vernacular for ordinary people, nevertheless for those with sufficient education to do so, Biblical study was best undertaken within the international common medium of Latin. It was only in 1700 that modern bilingual Bibles appeared in which the Authorised Version was compared with counterpart Dutch and French Protestant vernacular Bibles.

In consequence of the continual disputes over printing privileges, successive printings of the Authorised Version were notably less careful than the 1611 edition had been—compositors freely varying spelling, capitalisation and punctuation - and also, over the years, introducing about 1,500 misprints (some of which, like the omission of "not" from the commandment "Thou shalt not commit adultery" in the "Wicked Bible", became notorious). The two Cambridge editions of 1629 and 1638 attempted to restore the proper text - while introducing over 200 revisions of the original translators' work, chiefly by incorporating into the main text a more literal reading originally presented as a marginal note.

By the first half of the 18th century, the Authorised Version was effectively unchallenged as the sole English translation in then current use in Protestant churches, and was so dominant that the Catholic Church in England issued in 1750 a revision of the 1610 Douay–Rheims Bible by Richard Challoner that was much closer to the Authorised Version than to the original. However, general standards of spelling, punctuation, typesetting, capitalisation and grammar had changed radically in the 100 years since the first edition of the Authorised Version, and all printers in the market were introducing continual piecemeal changes to their Bible texts to bring them into line with then current practice—and with public expectations of standardised spelling and grammatical construction.

Over the course of the 18th century, the Authorised Version supplanted the Hebrew, Greek and the Latin Vulgate as the standard version of scripture for English speaking scholars and divines, and indeed came to be regarded by some as an inspired text in itself—so much so that any challenge to its readings or textual base came to be regarded by many as an assault on Holy Scripture.

In the 18th century there was a serious shortage of Bibles in the American colonies. To meet the demand various printers, beginning with Samuel Kneeland in 1752, printed the King James Bible without authorisation from the Crown. To avert prosecution and detection of an unauthorised printing they would include the royal insignia on the title page, using the same materials in its printing as the Authorised Version was produced from, which were imported from England.

=== Standard text of 1769 ===
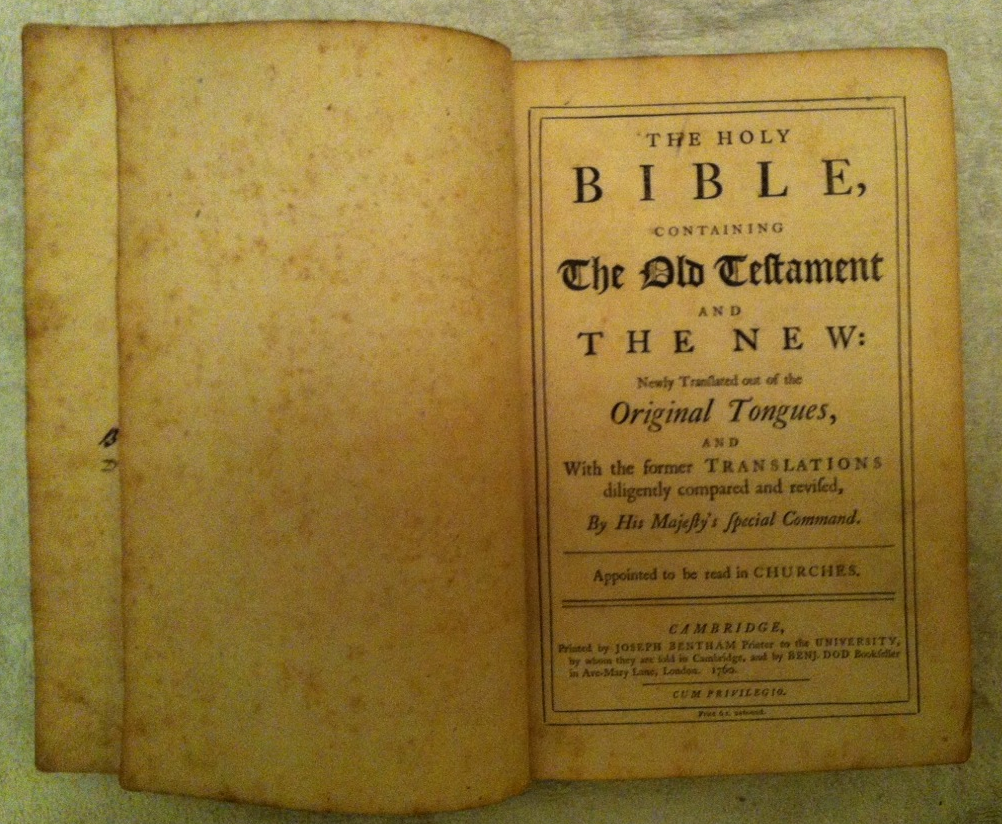
Title page of the 1760 Cambridge edition

By the mid-18th century, the wide variation in the various modernized printed texts of the Authorized Version, combined with the notorious accumulation of misprints, had reached the proportion of a scandal; and the Universities of Oxford and Cambridge both sought to produce an updated standard text. First of the two was the Cambridge edition of 1760, the culmination of 20 years' work by Francis Sawyer Parris, who died in May of that year. This 1760 edition was reprinted without change in 1762 and in John Baskerville's folio edition of 1763.

This was effectively superseded by the 1769 Oxford edition, edited by Benjamin Blayney, though with comparatively few changes from Parris's edition; but which became the Oxford standard text, and is reproduced almost unchanged in most current printings. Parris and Blayney sought consistently to remove those elements of the 1611 and subsequent editions that they believed were due to the vagaries of printers, while incorporating most of the revised readings of the Cambridge editions of 1629 and 1638, and each also introducing a few improved readings of their own.

They undertook the mammoth task of standardizing the wide variation in punctuation and spelling of the original, making many thousands of minor changes to the text. In addition, Blayney and Parris thoroughly revised and greatly extended the italicization of "supplied" words not found in the original languages by cross-checking against the presumed source texts. Blayney seems to have worked from the 1550 Stephanus edition of the Textus Receptus, rather than the later editions of Theodore Beza that the translators of the 1611 New Testament had favoured; accordingly the current Oxford standard text alters around a dozen italicizations where Beza and Stephanus differ. Like the 1611 edition, the 1769 Oxford edition included the Apocrypha, although Blayney tended to remove cross-references to the Books of the Apocrypha from the margins of their Old and New Testaments wherever these had been provided by the original translators. It also includes both prefaces from the 1611 edition. Altogether, the standardization of spelling and punctuation caused Blayney's 1769 text to differ from the 1611 text in around 24,000 places.

This is a side-by-side comparison of three verses from the 1611 and 1769 texts of 1 Corinthians 13:1–3. Note that the 1769 Cambridge Edition used the long s [ ſ ], as was common then, and for several decades after, this revision.

Comparison
1611 Edition using Roman text (Note: The 1833 Oxford version faithfully reproduced the 1611 first edition in a modern Roman typeface (originally in Blackletter): The Holy Bible, an Exact Reprint Page for Page of the Authorized Version Published in the Year MDCXI 2 volumes. Oxford: Oxford University Press, 1833 (reprints, ISBN 0-8407-0041-5, 1565631625 or available at Internet Archive: Vol1: https://archive.org/details/holybibleexactre00oxfouoft and Vol2: https://archive.org/details/holybibleexactre02oxfouoft). According to J.R. Dore, the 1833 reprint "represents the edition of 1611 so completely that it may be consulted with as much confidence as an original. The spelling, punctuation, italics, capitals, and distribution into lines and pages are all followed with the most scrupulous care. It is, however, printed in Roman instead of black letter type.")	1769 Oxford Edition as printed (Note: The 1769 edition was the Authorized Version updated with spelling, grammatical, and marginal corrections plus several of the running corrections of the translation made between 1611 and 1769 by printers and Bible scholars. It is said that the editor used notes from the 1611 translators and their source text to make a few decisions on updated wording: The Holy Bible (1769 ed.). Oxford: Oxford University, edited by Benjamin Blayney. p. 923.)
T Hough I speake with the tongues of men & of Angels, and haue not charity, I am become as sounding brasse or a tinkling cymbal.	T Hough I ſpeak with the tongues of men and of angels, and have not charity, I am become as ſounding braſs, or a tinkling cymbal.
2 And though I haue the gift of prophesie, and vnderstand all mysteries and all knowledge : and though I haue all faith, so that I could remooue mountaines, and haue no charitie, I am nothing.	2 And though I have the gift of prophecy, and underſtand all myſteries, and all knowledge; and though I have all faith, ſo that I could remove mountains, and have not charity, I am nothing.
3 And though I bestowe all my goods to feede the poore, and though I giue my body to bee burned, and haue not charitie, it profiteth me nothing.	3 And though I beſtow all my goods to feed the poor, and though I give my body to be burned, and have not charity, it profiteth me nothing.

There are a number of superficial edits in these three verses: 11 changes of spelling, 16 changes of typesetting (including the changed conventions for the use of u and v), three changes of punctuation, and one variant text—where "not charity" is substituted for "no charity" in verse two, in the belief that the original reading was a misprint.

A particular verse for which Blayney's 1769 text differs from Parris's 1760 version is Matthew 5:13, where Parris (1760) has

Ye are the salt of the earth: but if the salt have lost his savour, wherewith shall it be salted? it is thenceforth good for nothing but to be cast out, and to be troden under foot of men.

Blayney (1769) changes 'lost his savour' to 'lost its savour', and troden to trodden.

=== Standardization in the 19th century ===
For a period, Cambridge continued to issue Bibles using the Parris text, but the market demand for absolute standardization was now such that they eventually adapted Blayney's work but omitted some of the idiosyncratic Oxford spellings. By the mid-19th century, almost all printings of the Authorized Version were derived from the 1769 Oxford text—increasingly without Blayney's variant notes and cross references, and often excluding the Apocrypha. One exception to this was a scrupulous original-spelling, page-for-page, and word-for-word reprint of the 1611 edition (including chapter headings, marginalia, and original italicization) with the substitution of Roman type for the blackletter of the original, published by Oxford in 1833. A table of "Various Readings" or differences between the 1611 and 1613 editions shows what passages were "necessary to correct [...] in the time of the original Translators."

Another important exception was the 1873 Cambridge Paragraph Bible, a modernized and re-edited edition by F. H. A. Scrivener, who for the first time consistently identified the source texts underlying the 1611 translation and its marginal notes. Scrivener, like Blayney, opted to revise the translation where he considered the judgement of the 1611 translators had been faulty.

Scrivener's lengthy "Critical Introduction" to the 1873 edition noted that the Authorized Version had largely been standardized by the 17th century's Cambridge editions of 1629 and 1638 and that the 18th century versions of Parris and Blayney had markedly fewer revisions of significance. Scrivener also remarked that Blayney had made strides in adding apostrophes and publishing new italicized words, but complained that they were wrong in several instances.

Scrivener praised Parris and Blayney saying that "these two editors are the great modernizers of the diction of the version," and "their editions of the Bible are monuments of genuine industry and pious zeal."

However, he was displeased with many of their changes which he thought were unnecessary, rushed, or too modern, including their marginal notes and cross-references, deriding: "their tasteless and inconsistent meddling with archaic words and grammatical forms," and calling much of Blayney's italics edits "very careless." Scrivener disliked the 1769 edition further for its ubiquity in the 19th century in spite of its errors, decrying that "Blayney is followed in the rest by the whole flock of moderns, without enquiry and without suspicion."

F.H.A. Scrivener's edition included a table of major changes to the AV over the centuries that listed the editions by year in which each change was implemented and whether subsequent editions followed. The Cambridge Paragraph Bible agreed with hundreds of such alterations, while several more changes appeared in the 1873 edition for the first time, and still another large number of renderings were restorations of one of the two 1611 editions.

=== 20th century editions based on the 1769 edition ===
By the early 20th century, editing had been completed in Cambridge's text, with at least 6 new changes since 1769, and the reversing of at least 30 of the standard Oxford readings. The distinct Cambridge text was printed in the millions, and after the Second World War "the unchanging steadiness of the KJB was a huge asset."

It is also worth noting that some American publishers use the 1769 text, but with updated American spelling. Words like "colour" will be spelled as "color" and names like "Elias" will be rendered as "Elijah" in the New Testament.

In 2005, Cambridge University Press released its New Cambridge Paragraph Bible with Apocrypha, edited by David Norton, which followed in the spirit of Scrivener's work, attempting to bring spelling to present-day standards. Norton also innovated with the introduction of quotation marks, while returning to a hypothetical 1611 text, so far as possible, to the wording used by its translators, especially in the light of the re-emphasis on some of their draft documents. This text has been issued in paperback by Penguin Books.

=== Editorial criticism ===
F. H. A. Scrivener and D. Norton have both written in detail on editorial variations which have occurred through the history of the publishing of the Authorized Version from 1611 to 1769. In the 19th century, there were effectively three main guardians of the text. Norton identified five variations among the Oxford, Cambridge, and London (Eyre and Spottiswoode) texts of 1857, such as the spelling of "farther" or "further" at Matthew 26:39.

In the 20th century, variation between the editions was reduced to comparing the Cambridge to the Oxford. Distinctly identified Cambridge readings included "or Sheba", "sin", "clifts", "vapour", "flieth", "further" and a number of other references. In effect the Cambridge was considered the current text in comparison to the Oxford. These are instances where both Oxford and Cambridge have now diverged from Blayney's 1769 Edition. The distinctions between the Oxford and Cambridge editions have been a major point in the Bible version debate, and a potential theological issue, particularly in regard to the identification of the Pure Cambridge Edition.

Cambridge University Press introduced a change at 1 John 5:8 in 1985, reversing its longstanding tradition of printing the word "spirit" in lower case by using a capital letter "S". A Rev. Hardin of Bedford, Pennsylvania, wrote a letter to Cambridge inquiring about this verse, and received a reply on 3 June 1985 from the Bible Director, Jerry L. Hooper, claiming that it was a "matter of some embarrassment regarding the lower case 's' in Spirit".

== Revised versions ==
From the late 18th century, the Authorized Version has remained almost completely unchanged, and since, due to advances in printing technology, it could now be produced in very large editions for mass sale, it established complete dominance in public and ecclesiastical use in the English-speaking Protestant world. Academic debate through the 19th century, however, increasingly reflected concerns about the Authorized Version shared by some scholars: (a) that subsequent study in oriental languages suggested a need to revise the translation of the Hebrew Bible, both in terms of specific vocabulary, and also in distinguishing descriptive terms from proper names; (b) that the Authorized Version was unsatisfactory in translating the same Greek words and phrases into different English, especially where parallel passages are found in the synoptic gospels; and (c) in the light of subsequent ancient manuscript discoveries, the New Testament translation base of the Greek Textus Receptus could no longer be considered to be the best representation of the original text.

Responding to these concerns, the Convocation of Canterbury resolved in 1870 to undertake a revision of the text of the Authorized Version, intending to retain the original text "except where in the judgement of competent scholars such a change is necessary". The resulting revision was issued as the Revised Version in 1881 (New Testament), 1885 (Old Testament), and 1894 (Apocrypha); but, although it sold widely, the revision did not find popular favour, and it was only reluctantly in 1899 that Convocation approved it for reading in churches.

== Literary attributes ==
=== Marginal notes ===
In obedience to their instructions, the translators provided no marginal interpretation of the text, but in some 8,500 places a marginal note offers an alternative English wording. The majority of these notes offer a more literal rendering of the original, introduced as "Heb", "Chal" (Chaldee, referring to Aramaic), "Gr" or "Lat". Others indicate a variant reading of the source text (introduced by "or"). Some of the annotated variants derive from alternative editions in the original languages, or from variant forms quoted in the fathers. More commonly, though, they indicate a difference between the literal original language reading and that in the translators' preferred recent Latin versions: Tremellius for the Old Testament, Junius for the Apocrypha, and Beza for the New Testament. At thirteen places in the New Testament a marginal note records a variant reading found in some Greek manuscript copies; in almost all cases reproducing a counterpart textual note at the same place in Beza's editions.

A few more extensive notes clarify Biblical names and units of measurement or currency. Modern reprintings rarely reproduce these annotated variants, although they are to be found in the New Cambridge Paragraph Bible. In addition, there were originally some 9,000 scriptural cross-references, in which one text was related to another. Such cross-references had long been common in Latin Bibles, and most of those in the Authorized Version were copied unaltered from this Latin tradition. Consequently the early editions of the KJV retain many Vulgate verse references—e.g. in the numbering of the Psalms. At the head of each chapter, the translators provided a short précis of its contents, with verse numbers; these are rarely included in complete form in modern editions.

=== Use of typeface ===
Also in obedience to their instructions, the translators indicated 'supplied' words in a different typeface; but there was no attempt to regularize the instances where this practice had been applied across the different companies; and especially in the New Testament, it was used much less frequently in the 1611 edition than would later be the case. In one verse, 1 John 2:23, an entire clause was printed in roman type (as it had also been in the Great Bible and Bishops' Bible); indicating a reading then primarily derived from the Vulgate, albeit one for which the later editions of Beza had provided a Greek text.

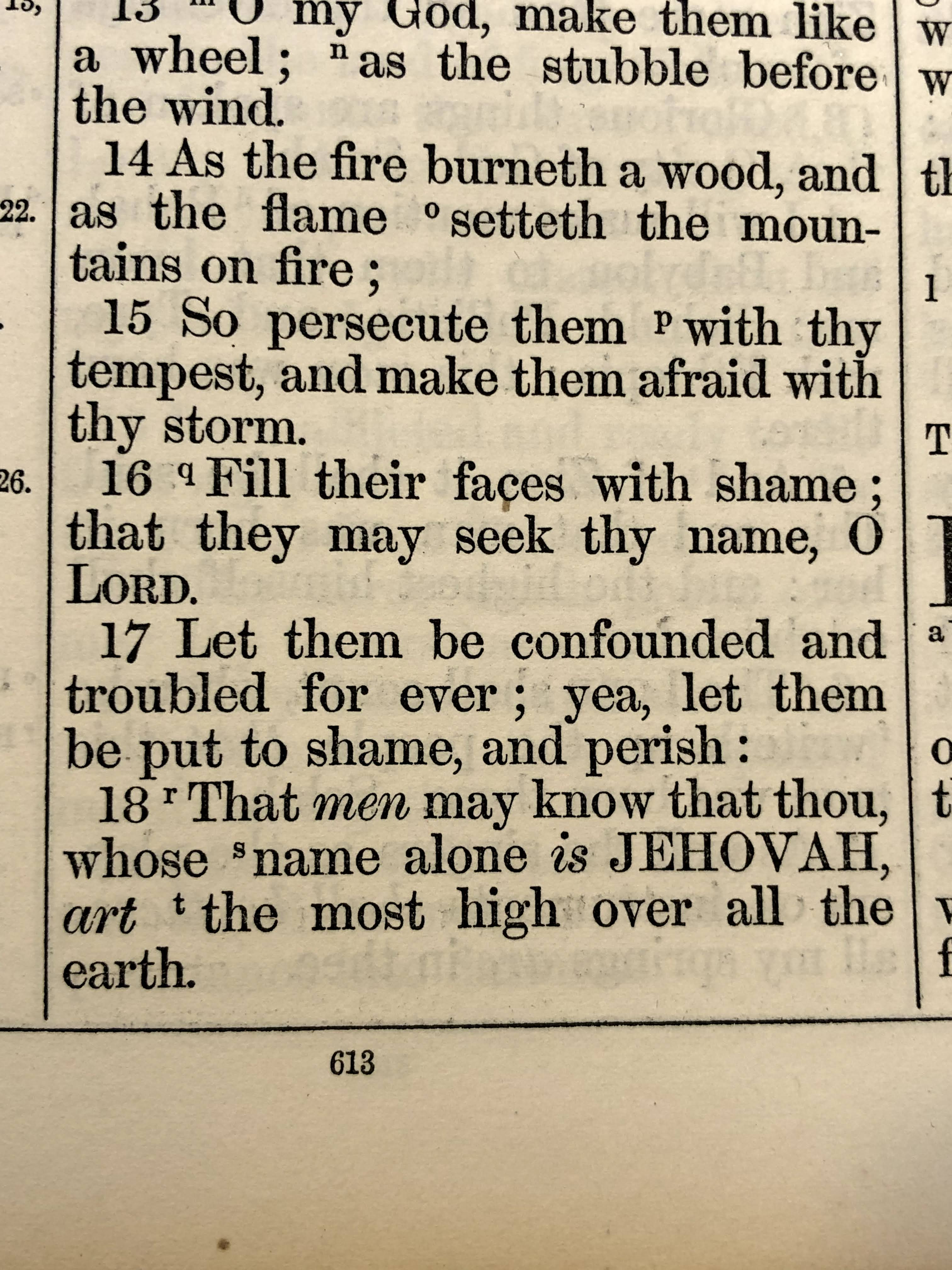
God’s name JEHOVAH in Psalms 83:18

In the Old Testament the translators render the Tetragrammaton (YHWH) by "the LORD" (in later editions in small capitals as LORD), (Note: Genesis 4:1) or "the LORD God" (for YHWH Elohim, יהוה אלהים), (Note: Genesis 2:4 "אלה תולדות השמים והארץ בהבראם ביום עשות יהוה אלהים ארץ ושמים") except in four places by "IEHOVAH". However, if the Tetragrammaton occurs with the Hebrew word adonai (Lord) then it is rendered not as the "Lord LORD" but as the "Lord God". In later editions it appears as "Lord god", with "god" in small capitals, indicating to the reader that God's name appears in the original Hebrew.

=== Source texts ===
==== Old Testament ====
For the Old Testament, the translators used a text originating in the editions of the Hebrew Rabbinic Bible by Daniel Bomberg (1524/5), but adjusted this to conform to the Greek Septuagint (LXX) or Latin Vulgate in passages to which Christian tradition had attached a Christological interpretation. For example, the Septuagint reading "They pierced my hands and my feet" was used in Psalm 22:16 (vs. the Masoretes' reading of the Hebrew "like lions my hands and feet"). Otherwise, however, the Authorized Version is closer to the Hebrew tradition than any previous English translation—especially in making use of the rabbinic commentaries, such as David Kimhi, in elucidating obscure passages in the Masoretic Text; earlier versions had been more likely to adopt LXX or Vulgate readings in such places. Following the practice of the Geneva Bible, the books of 1 Esdras and 2 Esdras in the medieval Vulgate Old Testament were renamed 'Ezra' and 'Nehemiah'; 3 Esdras and 4 Esdras in the Apocrypha being renamed '1 Esdras' and '2 Esdras'.

==== New Testament ====
For the New Testament, the translators chiefly used the 1598 and 1588/89 Greek editions of Theodore Beza, (Note: Edward F. Hills made the following important statement in regard to the KJV and the Received Text: The translators that produced the King James Version relied mainly, it seems, on the later editions of Beza's Greek New Testament, especially his 4th edition (1588–9). But also they frequently consulted the editions of Erasmus and Stephanus and the Complutensian Polyglot. According to Scrivener (1884), (51) out of the 252 passages in which these sources differ sufficiently to affect the English rendering, the King James Version agrees with Beza against Stephanus 113 times, with Stephanus against Beza 59 times, and 80 times with Erasmus, or the Complutensian, or the Latin Vulgate against Beza and Stephanus. Hence the King James Version ought to be regarded not merely as a translation of the Textus Receptus but also as an independent variety of the Textus Receptus. — Edward F. Hills, The King James Version Defended, p. 220.) which also present Beza's Latin version of the Greek and Stephanus's edition of the Latin Vulgate. Both of these versions were extensively referred to, as the translators conducted all discussions amongst themselves in Latin. F. H. A. Scrivener identifies 190 readings where the Authorized Version translators depart from Beza's Greek text, generally in maintaining the wording of the Bishops' Bible and other earlier English translations. In about half of these instances, the Authorized Version translators appear to follow the earlier 1550 Greek Textus Receptus of Stephanus. For the other half, Scrivener was usually able to find corresponding Greek readings in the editions of Erasmus, or in the Complutensian Polyglot. However, in several dozen readings he notes that no printed Greek text corresponds to the English of the Authorized Version, which in these places derives directly from the Vulgate. For example, at John 10:16, the Authorized Version reads "one fold" (as did the Bishops' Bible, and the 16th-century vernacular versions produced in Geneva), following the Latin Vulgate "unum ovile", whereas Tyndale had agreed more closely with the Greek, "one flocke" (μία ποίμνη). The Authorized Version New Testament owes much more to the Vulgate than does the Old Testament; still, at least 80% of the text is unaltered from Tyndale's translation.

==== Apocrypha ====
Unlike the rest of the Bible, the translators of the Apocrypha identified their source texts in their marginal notes. From these it can be determined that the books of the Apocrypha were translated from the Septuagint—primarily, from the Greek Old Testament column in the Antwerp Polyglot—but with extensive reference to the counterpart Latin Vulgate text, and to Junius's Latin translation. The translators record references to the Sixtine Septuagint of 1587, which is substantially a printing of the Old Testament text from the Codex Vaticanus Graecus 1209, and also to the 1518 Greek Septuagint edition of Aldus Manutius. They had, however, no Greek texts for 2 Esdras, or for the Prayer of Manasses, and Scrivener found that they here used an unidentified Latin manuscript.

==== Sources ====
The translators appear to have otherwise made no first-hand study of ancient manuscript sources, even those that - like the Codex Bezae - would have been readily available to them. In addition to all previous English versions (including, and contrary to their instructions, the Rheimish New Testament which in their preface they criticized), they made wide and eclectic use of all printed editions in the original languages then available, including the ancient Syriac New Testament printed with an interlinear Latin gloss in the Antwerp Polyglot of 1573. In the preface the translators acknowledge consulting translations and commentaries in Chaldee, Hebrew, Syrian, Greek, Latin, Spanish, French, Italian, and German.

The translators took the Bishops' Bible as their source text, and where they departed from that in favour of another translation, this was most commonly the Geneva Bible. However, the degree to which readings from the Bishops' Bible survived into final text of the King James Bible varies greatly from company to company, as did the propensity of the King James translators to coin phrases of their own. John Bois's notes of the General Committee of Review show that they discussed readings derived from a wide variety of versions and patristic sources, including explicitly both Henry Savile's 1610 edition of the works of John Chrysostom and the Rheims New Testament, which was the primary source for many of the literal alternative readings provided for the marginal notes.

=== Variations in recent translations ===
A number of Bible verses in the King James Version of the New Testament are not found in more recent Bible translations, where these are based on modern critical texts. In the early seventeenth century, the source Greek texts of the New Testament which were used to produce Protestant Bible versions were mainly dependent on manuscripts of the late Byzantine text-type, and they also contained minor variations which became known as the Textus Receptus. With the subsequent identification of much earlier manuscripts, most modern textual scholars value the evidence of manuscripts which belong to the Alexandrian family as better witnesses to the original text of the biblical authors, without giving it, or any family, automatic preference.

=== Style and criticism ===
A primary concern of the translators was to produce an appropriate Bible, dignified and resonant in public reading. Although the Authorized Version's written style is an important part of its influence on English, research has found only one verse—Hebrews 13:8—for which translators debated the wording's literary merits. While they stated in the preface that they used stylistic variation, finding multiple English words or verbal forms in places where the original language employed repetition, in practice they also did the opposite; for example, 14 different Hebrew words were translated into the single English word "prince".

In a period of rapid linguistic change the translators avoided contemporary idioms, tending instead towards forms that were already slightly archaic, like verily and it came to pass. The pronouns thou/thee and ye/you are consistently used as singular and plural respectively, even though by this time you was often found as the singular in general English usage, especially when addressing a social superior (as is evidenced, for example, in Shakespeare). For the possessive of the third person pronoun, the word its, first recorded in the Oxford English Dictionary in 1598, is avoided. The older his is usually employed, as for example at Matthew 5:13: "if the salt have lost his savour, wherewith shall it be salted?"; in other places of it, thereof or bare it are found. (Note: e.g. Matthew 7:27: "great was the fall of it.", Matthew 2:16: "in Bethlehem, and in all the coasts thereof", Leviticus 25:5: "That which groweth of it owne accord of thy harvest". (Leviticus 25:5 is changed to its in many modern printings).) Another sign of linguistic conservatism is the invariable use of -eth for the third person singular present form of the verb, as at Matthew 2:13: "the Angel of the Lord appeareth to Joseph in a dreame". The rival ending -(e)s, as found in present-day English, was already widely used by this time (for example, it predominates over -eth in the plays of Shakespeare and Marlowe). Furthermore, the translators preferred which to who or whom as the relative pronoun for persons, as in Genesis 13:5: "And Lot also which went with Abram, had flocks and heards, & tents" although who(m) is also found. (Note: e.g. at Genesis 3:12: "The woman whom thou gavest to be with mee")

The Authorized Version is notably more Latinate than previous English versions, especially the Geneva Bible. This results in part from the academic stylistic preferences of a number of the translators—several of whom admitted to being more comfortable writing in Latin than in English—but was also, in part, a consequence of the royal proscription against explanatory notes. Hence, where the Geneva Bible might use a common English word, and gloss its particular application in a marginal note, the Authorized Version tends rather to prefer a technical term, frequently in Anglicized Latin. Consequently, although the King had instructed the translators to use the Bishops' Bible as a base text, the New Testament in particular owes much stylistically to the Catholic Rheims New Testament, whose translators had also been concerned to find English equivalents for Latin terminology. In addition, the translators of the New Testament books transliterate names found in the Old Testament in their Greek forms rather than in the forms closer to the Old Testament Hebrew (e.g. "Elias" and "Noe" for "Elijah" and "Noah", respectively).

While the Authorized Version remains among the most widely sold, modern critical New Testament translations differ substantially from it in a number of passages, primarily because they rely on source manuscripts not then accessible to (or not then highly regarded by) early-17th-century Biblical scholarship. In the Old Testament, there are also many differences from modern translations that are based not on manuscript differences, but on a different understanding of Ancient Hebrew vocabulary or grammar by the translators. For example, in modern translations it is clear that Job 28:1–11 is referring throughout to mining operations, which is not at all apparent from the text of the Authorized Version.

=== Mistranslations ===
The King James Version contains several alleged mistranslations, especially in the Old Testament where the knowledge of Hebrew and cognate languages was uncertain at the time. Among the most commonly cited errors is in the Hebrew of Job and Deuteronomy, where Hebrew: רְאֵם, romanized: Re'em with the probable meaning of "wild-ox, aurochs", is translated in the KJV as "unicorn"; following in this the Vulgate unicornis and several medieval rabbinic commentators. The translators of the KJV note the alternative rendering, "rhinocerots" [sic] in the margin at Isaiah 34:7. On a similar note Martin Luther's German translation had also relied on the Latin Vulgate on this point, consistently translating רְאֵם using the German word for unicorn, Einhorn. Otherwise, the translators are accused on several occasions of having mistakenly interpreted a Hebrew descriptive phrase as a proper name (or vice versa); as at 2 Samuel 1:18 where "the Book of Jasher" (Hebrew: סֵפֶר הַיׇּשׇׁר, romanized: sepher ha-yasher) properly refers not to a work by an author of that name, but should rather be rendered as "the Book of the Upright" (which was proposed as an alternative reading in a marginal note to the KJV text).

Some scholars and commentators contend that these examples reflect differences in translation philosophy and ongoing lexical uncertainty rather than demonstrable mistranslation. In the case of the Hebrew: רְאֵם, romanized: Re'em, the precise referent remains disputed, and earlier translations such as the Septuagint (Greek: μονόκερως, romanized: monókerōs) and the Vulgate (Latin: unicornis) likewise render the term as a one-horned animal, indicating that the King James translators followed a long-standing interpretive tradition rather than an isolated or novel reading. It is further noted that the translators frequently acknowledged ambiguity by supplying alternative renderings in marginal notes, such as "rhinocerots" at Isaiah 34:7, suggesting awareness of competing interpretations rather than simple linguistic error.

Similarly, while the "Book of Jasher" can be translated descriptively as "Book of the Upright," it also appears to function as a title in multiple biblical passages (e.g., Joshua 10:13). Although several extant works bear the name Sefer ha-Yashar, including a medieval Midrashic collection and later compilations of Jewish legend, mainstream scholarship regards these as distinct from the "lost" book referenced in Scripture, and dates them to much later periods (e.g., 16th–17th centuries or later). From this viewpoint, the rendering "Book of Jasher"" in the KJV reflects a translation choice consistent with traditional Jewish and Christian usage of the title and recognizes that the original "Book of the Upright" remains lost to history.

== Influence ==
Despite royal patronage and encouragement, there was never any overt mandate to use the new translation. It was not until 1661 that the Authorized Version replaced the Bishops' Bible in the Epistle and Gospel lessons of the Book of Common Prayer, and it never did replace the older translation in the Psalter. In 1763 The Critical Review complained that "many false interpretations, ambiguous phrases, obsolete words and indelicate expressions ... excite the derision of the scorner". Blayney's 1769 version, with its revised spelling and punctuation, helped change the public perception of the Authorised Version to a masterpiece of the English language. By the 19th century, F. W. Faber could say of the translation, "It lives on the ear, like music that can never be forgotten, like the sound of church bells, which the convert hardly knows how he can forego."

Geddes MacGregor called the Authorized Version "the most influential version of the most influential book in the world, in what is now its most influential language", "the most important book in English religion and culture", and "the most celebrated book in the English-speaking world". David Crystal has estimated that it is responsible for 257 idioms in English; examples include feet of clay and reap the whirlwind. Furthermore, prominent atheist figures such as Christopher Hitchens and Richard Dawkins have praised the King James Version as being "a giant step in the maturing of English literature" and "a great work of literature", respectively, with Dawkins then adding, "A native speaker of English who has never read a word of the King James Bible is verging on the barbarian".

The King James Version is one of the versions authorised to be used in the services of the Episcopal Church and other parts of the Anglican Communion, as it is the historical Bible of this church.

It was presented to King Charles III at his coronation service.

Other Christian denominations have also accepted the King James Version. The King James Version is used by English-speaking Conservative Anabaptists, along with Methodists of the conservative holiness movement, in addition to certain Baptists. In the Orthodox Church in America, it is used liturgically and was made "the 'official' translation for a whole generation of American Orthodox". The later Service Book of the Antiochian archdiocese, in vogue today, also uses the King James Version. (Note: That which is most used liturgically is the King James Version. It has a long and honorable tradition in our Church in America. Professor Orloff used it for his translations at the end of the last century, and Isabel Hapgood's Service Book of 1906 and 1922 made it the "official" translation for a whole generation of American Orthodox. Both Orloff and Hapgood used a different version for the Psalms (that of the Anglican Book of Common Prayer), thereby giving us two translations in the same services. This was rectified in 1949 by the Service Book of the Antiochian Archdiocese, which replaced the Prayer Book psalms with those from the King James Version and made some other corrections. This translation, reproducing the stately prose of 1611, was the work of Fathers Upson and Nicholas. It is still in widespread use to this day, and has familiarized thousands of believers with the KJV.) The Church of Jesus Christ of Latter-day Saints continues to use its own edition of the Authorised Version as its official English Bible.

Although the Authorised Version's preeminence in the English-speaking world has diminished—for example, the Church of England recommends six other versions in addition to it—it is still the most used translation in the United States, especially as the Scofield Reference Bible for Evangelicals. However, over the past forty years it has been gradually overtaken by modern versions, principally the New International Version (1973), the New Revised Standard Version (1989), and the English Standard Version (2001), the latter of which is seen as a successor to the King James Version.

=== King James Only movement ===
The King James Only movement advocates the belief that the King James Version is superior to all other English translations of the Bible. Most adherents of the movement believe that the Textus Receptus is very close, if not identical, to the original autographs, thereby making it the ideal Greek source for the translation. They argue that manuscripts such as the Codex Sinaiticus and Codex Vaticanus, on which most modern English translations are based, are corrupted New Testament texts. One of them, Perry Demopoulos, was a director of the translation of the King James Bible into Russian. In 2010, a Russian translation of the KJV of the New Testament was released in Kyiv, Ukraine. In 2017, the first complete edition of a Russian King James Bible was released. In 2017, a Faroese translation of the King James Version was released.

== Copyright status ==
The Authorised Version is in the public domain in most of the world. In the United Kingdom, the right to print, publish and distribute it is a royal prerogative, and the Crown licenses publishers to reproduce it under letters patent. In England, Wales, and Northern Ireland, the letters patent are held by the King's Printer; in Scotland, they are held by the Scottish Bible Board. The office of the King's Printer has been associated with the right to reproduce the Bible for centuries, the earliest known reference coming in 1577.

In the 18th century, all surviving interests in the monopoly were bought out by John Baskett. The Baskett rights descended through a number of printers and, in England, Wales and Northern Ireland, the King's Printer is now Cambridge University Press, which inherited the right when they took over the firm of Eyre & Spottiswoode in 1990.

Other royal charters of similar antiquity grant Cambridge University Press and Oxford University Press the right to produce the Authorised Version independently of the King's Printer. In Scotland, the Authorized Version is published by Collins under licence from the Scottish Bible Board. The terms of the letters patent prohibit any other than the holders, or those authorised by the holders, from printing, publishing or importing the Authorised Version into the United Kingdom. The protection that the Authorised Version, and also the Book of Common Prayer, enjoy is the last remnant of the time when the Crown held a monopoly over all printing and publishing in the United Kingdom.

Although Crown Copyright usually expires 50 years after publication, Section 171(b) of the Copyright, Designs and Patents Act 1988 made an exception for "any right or privilege of the Crown" not written in an act of parliament, thus preserving the rights of the Crown under the unwritten royal prerogative.

=== Permission ===
Within the United Kingdom, Cambridge University Press permits the reproduction of at most 500 words for "liturgical and non-commercial educational use", provided that their prescribed acknowledgement is included, the quoted words do not exceed 25% of the publication quoting them and do not include a complete Bible book. For use beyond this, the Press is willing to consider permission requested on a case-by-case basis and in 2011 a spokesman said the Press generally does not charge a fee but tries to ensure that a reputable source text is used.

=== Apocrypha ===
Translations of the books of the biblical apocrypha were necessary for the King James Version, as readings from these books were included in the daily Old Testament lectionary of the Book of Common Prayer. Protestant Bibles in the 16th century included the books of the apocrypha—generally, following the Luther Bible, in a separate section between the Old and New Testaments to indicate they were not considered part of the Old Testament text—and there is evidence that these were widely read as popular literature, especially in Puritan circles.

The apocrypha of the King James Version has the same 14 books as had been found in the apocrypha of the Bishops' Bible; however, following the practice of the Geneva Bible, the Esdras books are named Ezra and Nehemiah (Old Testament) and 1 Esdras and 2 Esdras (apocrypha), rather than respectively 1, 2, 3, and 4 Esdras as in the Bishops' Bible and the Thirty-nine Articles. Starting in 1630, volumes of the Geneva Bible were occasionally bound with the pages of the apocrypha section excluded. In 1644, the Long Parliament forbade the reading of the apocrypha in churches; and in 1666, the first editions of the King James Bible without the apocrypha were bound.

The standardisation of the text of the Authorised Version after 1769 together with the technological development of stereotype printing made it possible to produce Bibles in large print-runs at very low unit prices. For commercial and charitable publishers, editions of the Authorised Version without the apocrypha reduced the cost, while having increased market appeal to non-Anglican Protestant readers.

With the rise of the Bible societies, most editions have omitted the whole section of apocryphal books. The British and Foreign Bible Society withdrew subsidies for Bible printing and dissemination in 1826, under the following resolution:

That the funds of the Society be applied to the printing and circulation of the Canonical Books of Scripture, to the exclusion of those Books and parts of Books usually termed Apocryphal;

The American Bible Society adopted a similar policy. Both societies eventually reversed these policies in light of 20th-century ecumenical efforts on translations, the ABS doing so in 1964 and the BFBS in 1966.

== See also ==
- 21st Century King James Version
- Bible errata
- Bible translations
- Charles XII Bible
- Dynamic and formal equivalence
- Modern English Bible translations § King James Versions and derivatives
- New King James Version
- Red letter edition
- Young's Literal Translation
