= Ralph Ravens =

- Born: 1553; London
- Died: 1616 (aged 62–63)
- Occupation(s): Clergyman and bible translator

Ralph Ravens (c. 1553 – 1616) was an English clergyman and academic. He was nominated in 1604 as one of the translators for the Authorised King James Version, in the Second Oxford Company, but his status is unclear. It is said that he was substituted, for reasons unknown, and did not actually take part in the project. It has been suggested that the Second Oxford Company, in which Richard Edes had died, had two substitutes, namely Leonard Hutten and John Aglionby. On the other hand, Ravens may have taken part in early meetings as a Greek scholar.

== Life ==
From London, he was educated at Merchant Taylors' School from 1571, and matriculated at St John's College, Oxford in 1575, aged 18, becoming a fellow in the same year. He graduated B.A. on 22 June 1579, and M.A. on 29 May 1583; he proceeded B.D. on 27 October 1589, and D.D. 20 January 1596. He is mentioned as Rodolphus Ravens in the Speculum of John Case.

He was ordained in 1587, by Thomas Cooper. He was vicar of Kirtlington, Oxfordshire, from 1591, Dunmow, Essex from 1597, and rector of Great Easton (also as Eyston Magna), Essex, from 1605.
