= New Cambridge Paragraph Bible =

Edited edition of the King James Version bible

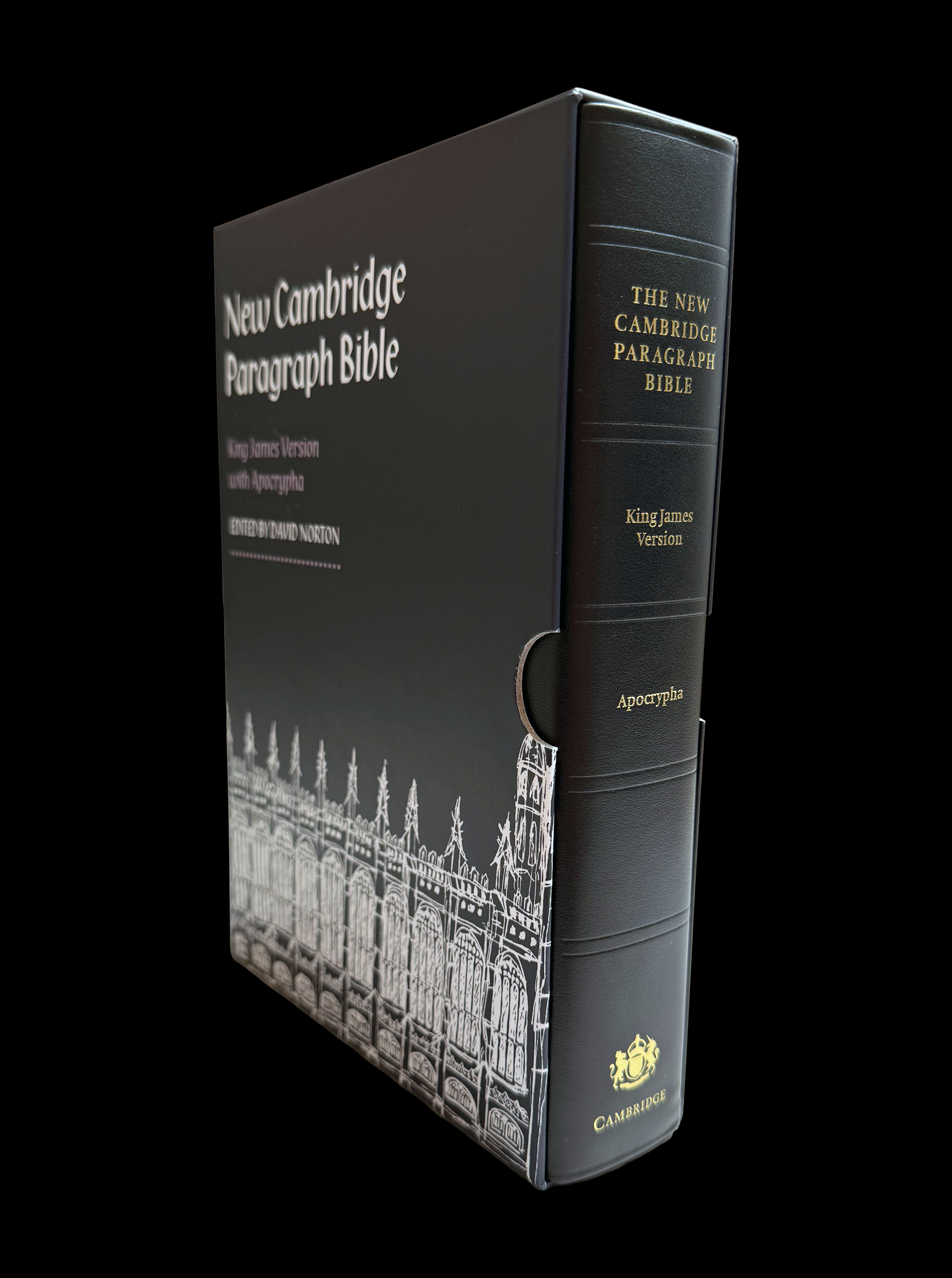
New Cambridge Paragraph Bible with the Apocrypha in calfskin

The New Cambridge Paragraph Bible with the Apocrypha is a newly edited edition of the King James Version of the Bible (KJV) published by Cambridge University Press in 2005. This 2005 edition was printed as The Bible (Penguin Classics) in 2006. The editor is David Norton, Reader in English at Victoria University of Wellington, New Zealand. Norton is author of A History of the Bible as Literature (1993) revised and condensed as A History of the English Bible as Literature (2000). He wrote A Textual History of the King James Bible as a companion volume to the New Cambridge Paragraph Bible.

== The original Cambridge Paragraph Bible ==
A previous edition of the KJV called the Cambridge Paragraph Bible was published in 1873. That volume was edited by F.H.A. Scrivener, one of the translators of the English Revised Version and a noted scholar of the text of the Bible. For a long time it was perhaps best known as the KJV text in the standard reference work The New Testament Octapla edited by Luther Weigle, chairman of the translation committee that produced the Revised Standard Version. Logos Bible Software includes an electronic text of the Cambridge Paragraph Bible as of certain editions of version 3 of its Bible program.

There are some differences between the "original" KJV text and Scrivener's work, although whether these were valid corrections or misrepresentations may be up to the reader. Some of the differences include:

- In Matthew 23:24, Scrivener changes KJV's "strain at a gnat" to "strain out a gnat" (emphasis added) on the basis of the belief that it was a printer's error or a mistranslation, as it is commonly known that hulizō means "to filter".
- In Hebrews 10:23's, "Let us hold fast the profession of our faith" is rendered as "Let us hold fast the profession of our hope" (emphasis added); this change was allegedly to fix a translator error;
- there are instances of spelling that are intentionally left unmodernized, such as "ebeny" for "ebony" and "mo" for "more";
- The famous Johannine Comma passage in 1 John 5:7–8 is italicized by Scrivener due to its disputed authenticity as a later interpolation. This italicization was not in older copies of the KJV, however. (This italicization has been removed from Zondervan's reprints of the Cambridge Paragraph Bible text but can be seen in the New Testament Octapla's reprinting.)

Although Scrivener's text has been highly regarded since its appearance, it has not had a major influence on current editions of the KJV, which are essentially reprints of the 1769 Oxford edition by Benjamin Blayney. Therefore, current KJV printings feature certain post-1611-edition editorial changes, 18th century spelling, an enhanced system of "supplied words" (the words printed in italics as having no equivalent in the original Biblical texts but added for clarity), and emended punctuation.

== The reasons for a new recension ==
In his Textual History, Prof. Norton describes the process by which Cambridge University Press commissioned the New Cambridge Paragraph Bible. The beginning dates back to 1994, when the press' Bible Publishing Manager needed to decide on any changes or corrections that would have to be made to the KJV text published by Cambridge, given that the film from which the press printed its text was becoming worn and in need of replacement. Two possibilities that emerged were to use Scrivener's text or to simply adopt Cambridge's own Concord KJV edition as the basis; however, neither gave exactly the translator's text or used consistent modern spelling. Cambridge eventually chose a different option, to have the KJV edited afresh. This also provided the opportunity to give the KJV a new formatting, one which follows the path broken by Scrivener in the first Cambridge Paragraph Bible but is by no means bound to his decisions regarding presentation; instead, the formatting of the volume has been completely reworked by Norton.

== Features of the new edition ==
Using such sources as the first edition published in 1611, a manuscript preserved from the first stage of the KJV translors' work (known as Lambeth Palace MS 98), and a complete Bishops' Bible annotated by them (known as Bodleian Library Bibl. Eng. 1602 b. 1), Norton re-edited the KJV. His edition:

- divides the text into paragraphs (and poetic line-divisions for poetic portions like the Psalms);
- introduces modern spelling in preference to that of the 18th century—"assuaged" rather than "asswaged," "music" rather than "musick," "show" instead of "shew," etc.;
- in some cases, changes archaic verb conjugations or word forms (such as "spoke" for "spake", "dug" for "digged", and "astrologers" for "astrologians")
- replaces “mine” and “thine” with “my” and “thy” when they are possessive determiners;
- adds quotation marks for dialogue and words indicated as spoken in the Bible text;
- restores certain readings of the 1611 edition that were modified by later editions.

Aside from modernization, Norton's recension is for the most part quite conservative in terms of changing textual readings from those in standard editions. For example, no readings are introduced from the above-mentioned manuscripts that occur only in them, though the annotations they contain are used to support 1611 first edition readings as demonstrating a deliberate decision by the original translators that has been overruled by subsequent hands. Norton writes in the introduction, "Except where there are good reasons to think that the first edition does not represent the readings the translators decided on, first edition readings are restored" (2005, p. ix). Also, other than the quotation marks, the punctuation—where changed from that of the current standard KJV text—mainly provides a simple restoration of 1611's punctuation.

One of the more radical changes is to eliminate the main text's differentiation of the "supplied words" usually printed in italics in current KJVs. (Such words are, however, intentionally retained in the marginal notes.) Norton points out that the original edition's supplied words, printed in Roman type in 1611 as opposed to the black-letter of the main text, were very inadequately marked; although many subsequent editors have tried to revise them (especially Scrivener), Norton feels that they are misunderstood by most readers and are ineffective even for those who know their purpose.

== Bibliography ==
- Norton, David, ed. (2005), The New Cambridge Paragraph Bible with the Apocrypha (hardcover), Cambridge: Cambridge University Press, ISBN 0-521-84386-3, ISBN 0-521-84387-1 (genuine leather).
- Norton, David (2005). A Textual History of the King James Bible. Cambridge: Cambridge University Press. ISBN 0-521-77100-5.
- Norton, David, ed. (2006), The Bible: King James Version with The Apocrypha, with an Introduction and Notes (paperback), Penguin Classics, London: Penguin, ISBN 0-14-144151-8; reprint of New Cambridge Paragraph Bible text without translators' notes.
- Barker, Kenneth, ed. (2002), KJV Study Bible, Grand Rapids, MI: Zondervan, ISBN 0-310-91893-6.
