= Frederick Henry Ambrose Scrivener =

English writer and scholar (1813–1891)

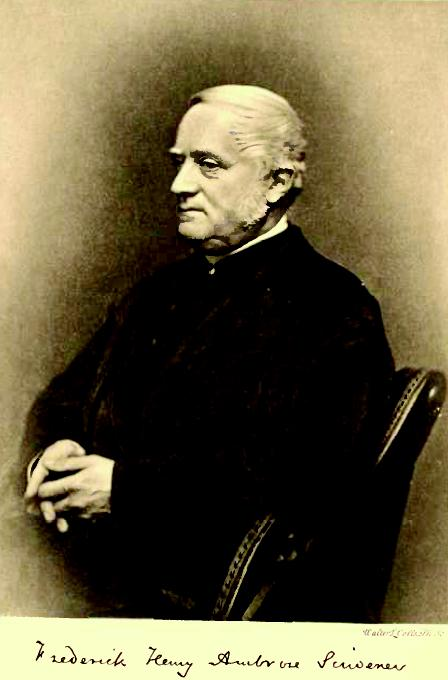
- Portrait of Frederick Henry Ambrose Scrivener, 1894
- Born: 29 September 1813; Bermondsey, England
- Died: 30 October 1891 (aged 78); Hendon, England
- Occupations: Writer; scholar

Frederick Henry Ambrose Scrivener (29 September 1813 – 30 October 1891) was an English writer and scholar. Additionally, he was a New Testament textual critic and a member of the English New Testament Revision Committee which produced the Revised Version of the Bible. He was prebendary of Exeter, and vicar of Hendon.

== Life ==
Graduating from Trinity College, Cambridge in 1835 after studying at Southwark, he became a teacher of classics at a number of schools in southern England, and from 1846 to 1856 was headmaster of a school in Falmouth, Cornwall. He was also for 15 years rector of Gerrans, Cornwall.

Initially making a name for himself editing the Codex Bezae Cantabrigiensis, Scrivener edited several editions of the New Testament and collated the Codex Sinaiticus with the Textus Receptus. For his services to textual criticism and the understanding of biblical manuscripts, he was granted a Civil list pension in 1872. He was an advocate of the Byzantine text (majority text) over more modern manuscripts as a source for Bible translations. He was the first to distinguish the Textus Receptus from the Byzantine text. Scrivener compared the Textus Receptus with the editions of Stephanus (1550), Theodore Beza (1565), and Elzevier (1633) and enumerated all the differences. In addition he identified the differences between the Textus Receptus and editions by Lachmann, Tregelles, and Tischendorf. Scrivener doubted the authenticity of texts like Matthew 16:2b–3, Christ's agony at Gethsemane, John 5:3.4, and the Pericope Adulterae.

After the success of his earlier work (Supplement to English Version, 1845), Scrivener was tapped to lead the last major revision to the Authorized English Version, popularly known as the King James Bible (KJV). The KJV had undergone numerous minor revisions since its publication in 1611, the most prominent being the Oxford Edition of 1769. The Cambridge Paragraph Bible, published in 1873, was his magnum opus, becoming the basis for most modern printings of the KJV in England. Scrivener did not always agree with the textual theories of Westcott and Hort, and was often out-voted on the Revision Committee.

In 1874, he became prebendary of Exeter and vicar of Hendon, where he remained for the rest of his life.

== Works ==
- A Supplement to the Authorized English Version of the New Testament: Being a Critical Illustration of its More Difficult Passages from the Syriac, Latin, and Earlier English Versions, with an Introduction, 1845.
- Scrivener, Frederick Henry Ambrose (1853). Full and Exact Collation of About Twenty Greek Manuscripts of the Holy Gospels. Cambridge: John W. Parker and Son.
- Scrivener, Frederick Henry Ambrose (1859). An Exact Transcript of the Codex Augiensis. Cambridge and London: Deighton Bell & Co.
- Contributions to the criticism of the Greek New Testament: being the introduction to an edition of the Codex Augiensis and Fifty other Manuscripts (Cambridge: 1859)
- A Plain Introduction to the Criticism of the New Testament, 1861, 1894.
- A Full Collation of the Sinaitic MS. with the Received Text of the New Testament. 1864.
- A full and exact collation of Codex Sinaiticus, 1864.
- Bezae Codex Cantabrigiensis: being an exact Copy, in ordinary Type, of the celebrated Uncial Graeco-Latin Manuscript of the Four Gospels and Acts of the Apostles, written early in the Sixth Century, and presented to the University of Cambridge by Theodore Beza A.D. 1581. Edited, with a critical Introduction, Annotations, and Facsimiles, 1864.
- The Cambridge Paragraph Bible of the Authorized English Version, with the text revised by a collation of its early and other principal editions, the use of the Italic type made uniform, the marginal references remodelled, and a critical introduction prefixed, editor, The Rev. F.H. Scrivener, M.A., LL.D, Edited for the Syndics of the University Press, Cambridge, 1873.
- Six Lectures on the Text of the New Testament and the Ancient Manuscripts which contain it, Deighton, Bell, and Co: Cambridge; London, 1875.
- Novum Testamentum : textus Stephanici A.D. 1550 : accedunt variae lectiones editionum Bezae, Elzeviri, Lachmanni, Tischendorfii, Tregellesii (Cambridge 1877).
- The New Testament in the Original Greek according to the Text followed in the Authorized Version, together with the Variations adopted in the Revised Version, 1881.
- Novum Testamentum : Textus Stephanici A.D. 1550 : accedunt variae lectiones editionum Bezae, Elzeviri, Lachmanni, Tischendorfii, Tregellesii, Westcott-Hort, Versionis Anglicanae Emendatorum (1887).
- Codex S. Ceaddae latinus: Evangelia SSS. Matthaei, Marci, Lucae Ad Cap. III. 9 Complectens. Cambridge: C.J. Clay and Sons, 1887.
- Scrivener, Frederick Henry Ambrose (1893). Adversaria Critica Sacra: With a Short Explanatory Introduction. Cambridge: At The University Press.
- A Plain Introduction to the Criticism of the New Testament, for the Use of Biblical Students (published posthumously and coauthored by Edward Miller), 1894.
