= Roger Andrewes =

English churchman (1574–1635)

Roger Andrewes (sometimes Andrews; 1574–1635) was an English churchman and academic, archdeacon and Chancellor at Chichester Cathedral in the English Church. He was also a scholar, a Fellow of Pembroke Hall and was, in 1618, made Master of Jesus College, Cambridge.

He was the younger brother of the scholar and cleric Lancelot Andrewes and, like his brother, served as a translator for the King James Version of the Bible.

He was the incumbent of many church parishes during his life, including Cocking in West Sussex from September 1606 to July 1609.

== Bibliography ==
- McClure, Alexander. (1858) The Translators Revived: A Biographical Memoir of the Authors of the English Version of the Holy Bible. Mobile, Alabama: R. E. Publications (republished by the Maranatha Bible Society, 1984 ASIN B0006YJPI8)
- Nicolson, Adam. (2003) God's Secretaries: The Making of the King James Bible. New York: HarperCollins ISBN 0-06-095975-4

Academic offices
Preceded by John Duport	Master of Jesus College, Cambridge; 1618–1632	Succeeded by William Beale
