= William Beale (college head) =

English royalist churchman

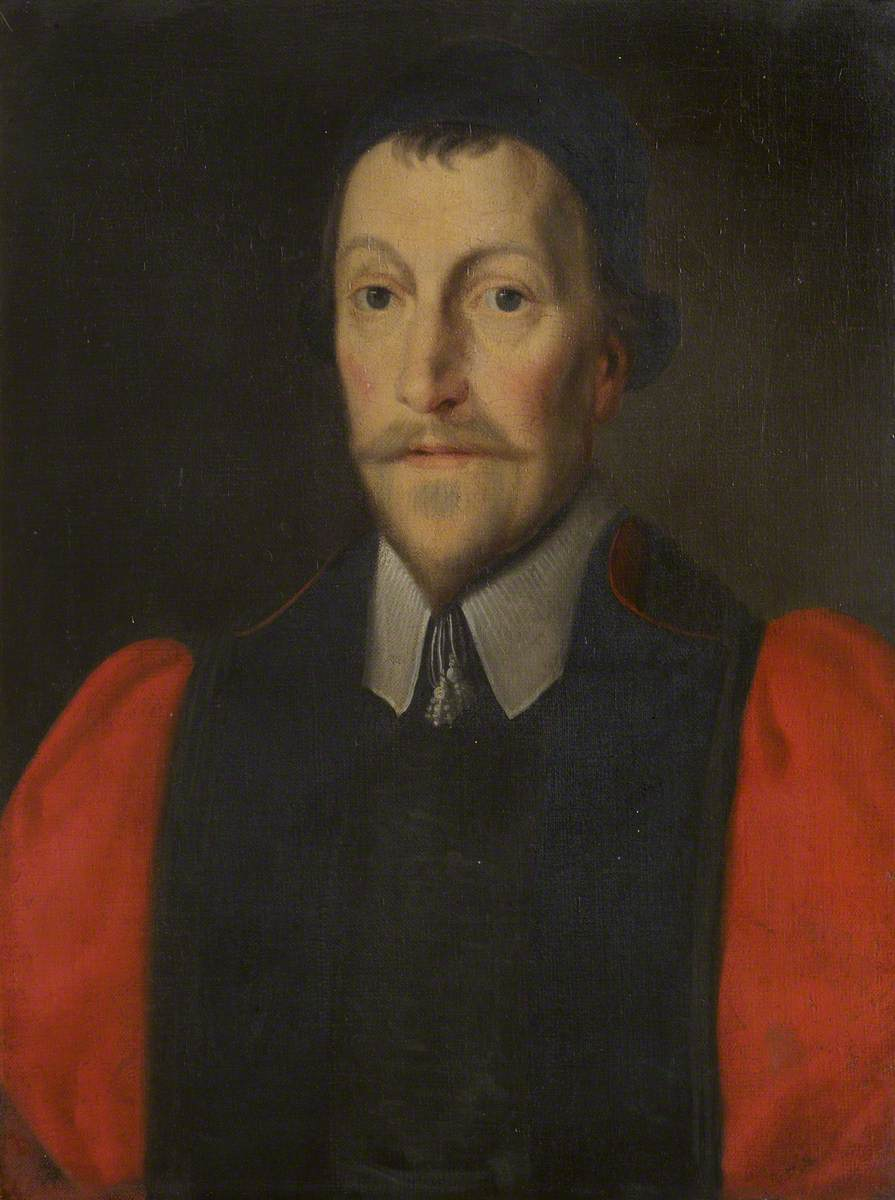
- William Beale
- Born: William Beale; England
- Died: 1 October 1651; Madrid, Spain
- Education: Westminster School; Jesus College, Cambridge; St John's College, Cambridge; Trinity College, Cambridge (B.A.)
- Occupations: Royalist churchman master; archdeacon; Jesus College; Archdeacon of Carmarthen; St John's College, Cambridge

William Beale (died 1 October 1651) was an English royalist churchman, Master in turn of Jesus College, Cambridge and St John's College, Cambridge. He was subjected to intense attacks by John Pym from 1640, for an unpublished sermon he had given in 1635 supporting royal prerogative. According to Glenn Burgess, Pym's attention to Beale was because he exhibited a rare combination of Arminian or Laudian theological views with explicit political views tending to absolutism.

== Life ==
He was elected from Westminster School to a scholarship at Trinity College, Cambridge, in 1605, and proceeded B.A. in 1610. He was chosen a fellow of Jesus College in the same university in 1611, commenced M.A. in 1613, and was appointed Archdeacon of Carmarthen in 1623, a post which he held until his death. He was created D.D. in 1627. Beale became master of Jesus College on 14 July 1632, and on 20 February 1634 he was admitted Master of St John's College, Cambridge, a post which he retained until 1644. He was Vice Chancellor of Cambridge University from 1634 to 1635. On 27 October 1637 he was presented by the king to the rectory of Paulerspury in Northamptonshire. He had also the rectory of Cottingham in the same county, Carlton, and Paulerspury. In 1639 he was presented to the sinecure rectory of Aberdaron.

In the year 1642 Beale took an active part in urging the various colleges to send money and plate to the king at Nottingham. Oliver Cromwell, having failed to intercept the treasure in Huntingdonshire, proceeded to Cambridge with a large force. He surrounded St. John's College while its inmates were in the chapel, and took as prisoners Beale, Edward Martin, and Richard Sterne, Master of Jesus College. He brought them to the Tower of London. At this period Beale was deprived of his mastership and all his ecclesiastical preferments. From the Tower the prisoners were moved to Lord Petre's house in Aldersgate Street.

After a confinement of three years, Beale was released by exchange, and joined the king at Oxford. There he was incorporated D.D. in 1645, and in the following year he was nominated Dean of Ely, though he was never admitted to the dignity. He was one of the divines selected by the king to accompany him to Holdenby (1646). Ultimately he went into exile and accompanied the embassy of Lord Cottington and Sir Edward Hyde to Spain. His death occurred at Madrid on 1 October 1651.

== Notes and references ==
- This article incorporates text from a publication now in the public domain: "Beale, William (d.1651)". Dictionary of National Biography. London: Smith, Elder & Co. 1885–1900.

=== citations ===
Academic offices
| Preceded by Roger Andrewes | Master of Jesus College, Cambridge; 1632–1634 | Succeeded by Richard Sterne |
| Preceded by Owen Gwyn | Master of St John's College, Cambridge; 1634–1644 | Succeeded by John Arrowsmith |
