= John Duport =

English scholar and translator

John Duport (died 1617) was an English scholar and translator.

== Early life and career ==
Dr John Duport was born in Shepshed in Leicestershire. He was educated at Jesus College, Cambridge, where he became a Fellow in 1574. In 1583, he became rector of Fulham, and in 1585, precentor of St Paul's Cathedral. In 1590, he was appointed Master of Jesus College. He served as Director of the "Second Cambridge Company" charged by James I of England with translating parts the Apocrypha for the King James Version of the Bible. In 1609, he added the prebendary of Ely to his income.

== Personal life ==
Duport married Rachel Cox, daughter of Richard Cox, Bishop of Ely. Their son, James Duport, a child when John Duport died, also became a scholar, and Master of Magdalene College.

Academic offices
Preceded by John Bell	Master of Jesus College, Cambridge; 1590–1618	Succeeded by Roger Andrewes
