= Leonard Hutten =

English clergyman and antiquary

Leonard Hutten (1557?–1632) was an English clergyman and antiquary.

== Life ==
Born about 1557, he was educated on the foundation at Westminster School, and was elected to Christ Church, Oxford, in 1574. He graduated B.A. on 12 November 1578, and M.A. on 3 March 1582, commenced B.D. on 27 April 1591. and was admitted D.D. on 14 April 1600. In January 1587 he was presented by his college to the vicarage of Long Preston, Yorkshire, which he held until December 1588. He was next instituted to the rectory of Rampisham, Dorset, on 10 October 1595, and ceded it in 1601. On 19 December 1599 he was made a prebendary of Christ Church Cathedral, and on 6 June 1601 received the vicarage of Flore, Northamptonshire, another college preferment, which he retained with his prebend until his death. He was also subdean of Christ Church.

He officiated at the opening of the Bodleian Library in 1602, and on 24 September of that year became vicar of Weedon Beck, Northamptonshire, a preferment which he resigned in 1604. He was appointed by James I of England in 1604 one of the translators of the King James Version; apparently this was to the Second Oxford Company, but the exact composition of that company is still the subject of debate. On 1 October 1609 he was installed a prebendary in St. Paul's Cathedral. He died on 17 May 1632, aged 75, and was buried in the divinity (or Latin) chapel of Christ Church Cathedral. By his wife, Anne Hamden, he had a daughter Alice, married to Richard Corbet, afterwards successively bishop of Oxford and Norwich.

== Works ==
Hutten contributed to the collection of verses made by Christ Church when James I visited the college in 1605, and to other of the university collections. During the same year he published a learned work called An Answere to a certaine treatise of the Crosse in Baptisme intituled A Short Treatise of the Crosse in Baptisme, Oxford, 1605, dedicated to Richard Bancroft, archbishop of Canterbury, whose chaplain he was. He left in manuscript an English dissertation on the Antiquities of Oxford, which was printed in 1720 by Thomas Hearne in his edition of the Textus Roffensis from a copy belonging to Robert Plot, and again in 1887 by Charles Plummer in Elizabethan Oxford (Oxf. Hist. Soc.).

Hutten was the author of a play entitled Bellum Grammaticale, based on Andrea Guarna's 1512 work of the same name. It was performed at Oxford before Elizabeth I in 1592, and printed at London in 1635 and 1726.
