= Andrew Downes (scholar) =

English classical scholar

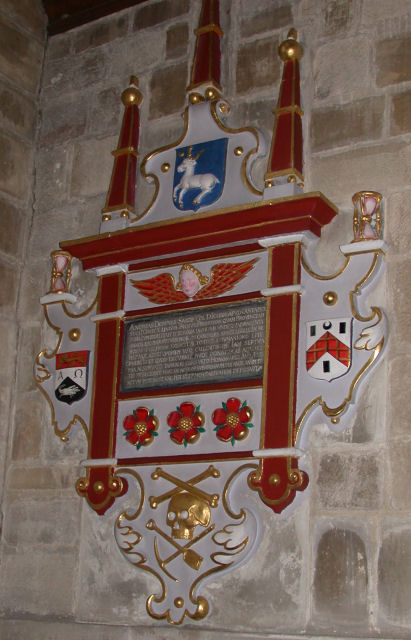
Memorial in St Peter's, Coton

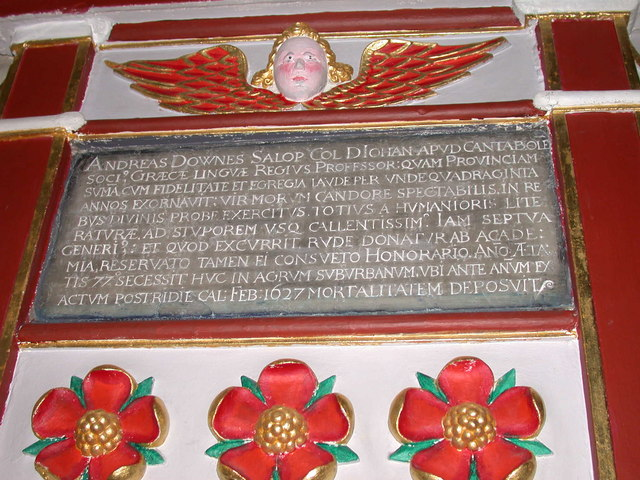
Inscription on memorial

Andrew Downes, also known as Dounaeus (c. 1549 – 2 February 1628), was an English classical scholar.

== Life ==
He was born in the county of Shropshire, and was educated at Shrewsbury School and St. John's College, Cambridge, where he did much to revive the study of Greek, at that time at a very low ebb.

In 1571 he was elected fellow of his college, and, in 1585, he was appointed to the Regius Professor of Greek, which he held for nearly forty years. He died at Coton, near Cambridge, on 2 February 1627/1628. According to Simonds d'Ewes, who attended his lectures on Demosthenes and gives a slight sketch of his personality, Downes was accounted "the ablest Grecian of Christendom."

He published little, but seems to have devoted his chief attention to the Greek orators. A 1587 edition of Plato's Menexenus, the first Greek book printed at Cambridge and the first Greek Plato printed in England, "set as a teaching text...was almost certainly printed as part of the curriculum established by Andrew Downes." He edited Lysias' Pro caede Eratosthenis (1593); Praelectiones in Philippicam de pace Demosthenis (1621), dedicated to James I of England; some letters (written in Greek) to Isaac Casaubon, printed in the Epistolae of the latter; and notes to John Chrysostom, in Sir Henry Savile's edition. Downes was also one of the seven translators of the Apocrypha for the King James Version of the Bible, and one of the six learned men appointed to revise the new version after its completion.
