= Corpus Christi College, Cambridge =

College of the University of Cambridge, founded 1352

Corpus Christi College
- University of Cambridge
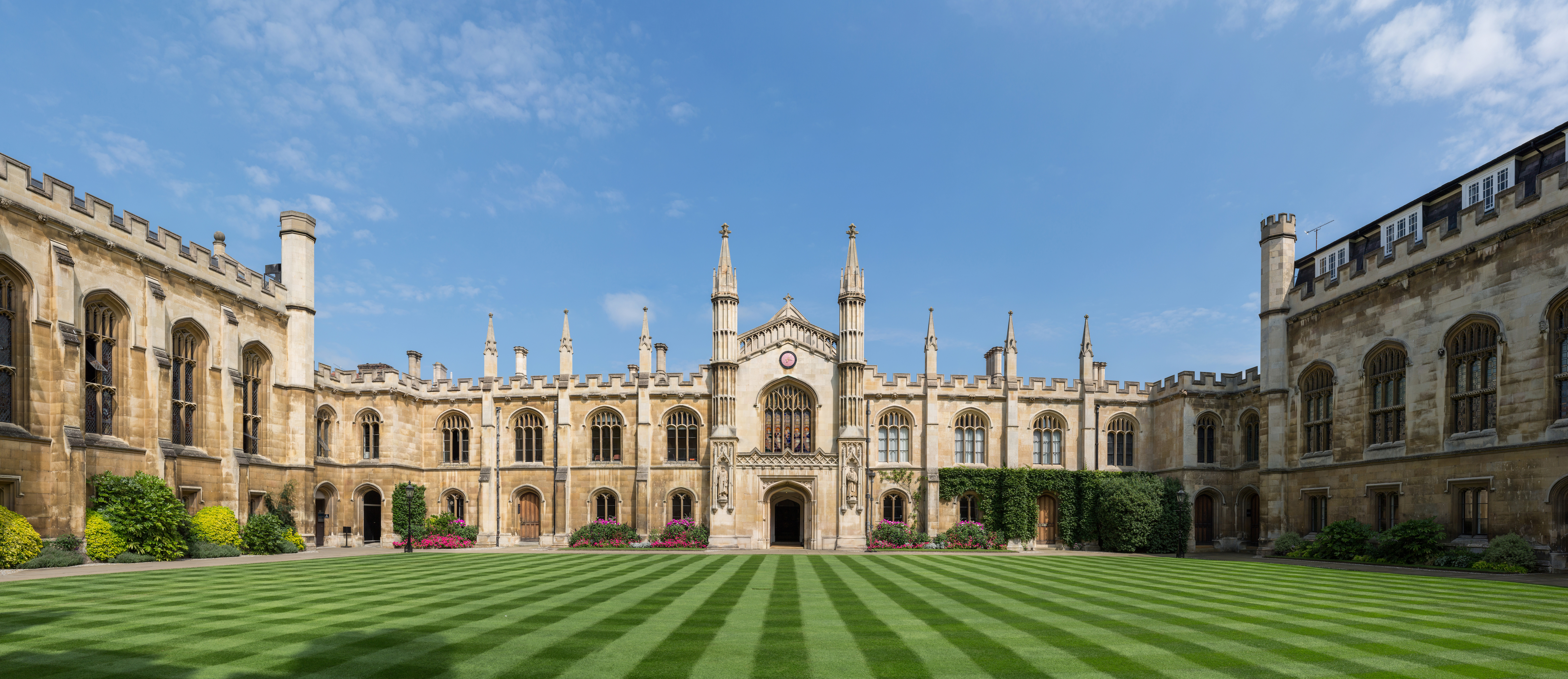
- Corpus Christi College New Court

- Arms of Corpus Christi College; Arms: Quarterly gules and azure, in the first and fourth quarters a pelican in its piety and in the second and third three lily-flowers slipped and leaved all argent.
Scarf colours: cherry pink, with two equally-spaced narrow white stripes
- Location: Trumpington Street (map)
- Coordinates: 52.2031°N 0.1180°E
- Full name: The College of Corpus Christi and the Blessed Virgin Mary in the University of Cambridge
- Abbreviation: CC
- Motto: The college has no motto, but there is a toast used at many events: Floreat Antiqua Domus (Latin)
- Motto in English: May the old house flourish
- Founders: The Guild of Corpus Christi, The Guild of the Blessed Virgin Mary
- Established: 1352; 674 years ago
- Former names: Informal: Bene’t College or Benedict College (until about the 1820s)
- Sister college: Corpus Christi College, Oxford
- Master: Christopher Kelly
- Undergraduates: 335 (2022–2023)
- Postgraduates: 212 (2022–2023)
- Endowment: £99.7M (2023)
- Visitor: Chancellors of the University ex officio
- Website: www.corpus.cam.ac.uk
- JCR: jcr.corpus.cam.ac.uk
- MCR: www.corpus.cam.ac.uk/mcr/
- Boat club: Corpus Christi College Boat Club

Map
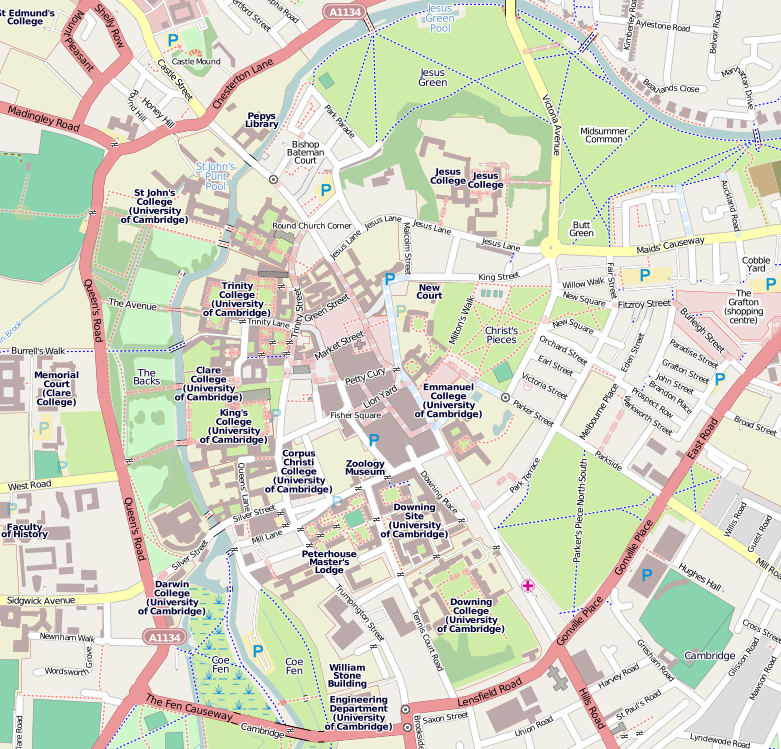
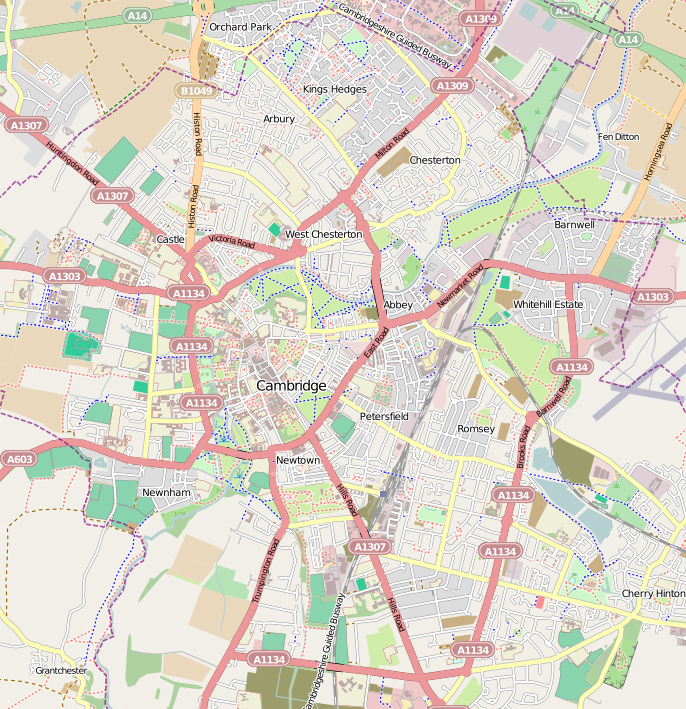
- Location within Central Cambridge Location within Cambridge

Corpus Christi College (full name: "The College of Corpus Christi and the Blessed Virgin Mary", often shortened to "Corpus") is a constituent college of the University of Cambridge. From the late 14th century to the early 19th century it was also commonly known as Bene't College.

The college is notable as the only one founded by Cambridge townspeople: it was established in 1352 by the Guild of Corpus Christi and the Guild of the Blessed Virgin Mary, making it the sixth-oldest college in Cambridge. With around 300 undergraduates and 200 postgraduates, it also has the second smallest student body of the traditional colleges of the university, after Peterhouse.

The College has traditionally been one of the more academically successful colleges in the University of Cambridge. In the unofficial Tompkins Table, which ranks the colleges by the class of degrees obtained by their undergraduates, in 2012 Corpus was in third position, with 32.4% of its undergraduates achieving first-class degrees. The college's average position between 2003 and 2012 was ninth, and in the 2024 rankings it was placed third. In 2024, the college also ranked first overall for finalists.

Corpus ranks among the wealthiest Cambridge colleges in terms of fixed assets, being exceptionally rich in silver. The College's endowment was valued at £99.7 million at the end of June 2023, while its net assets were valued at £239 million.

== History ==
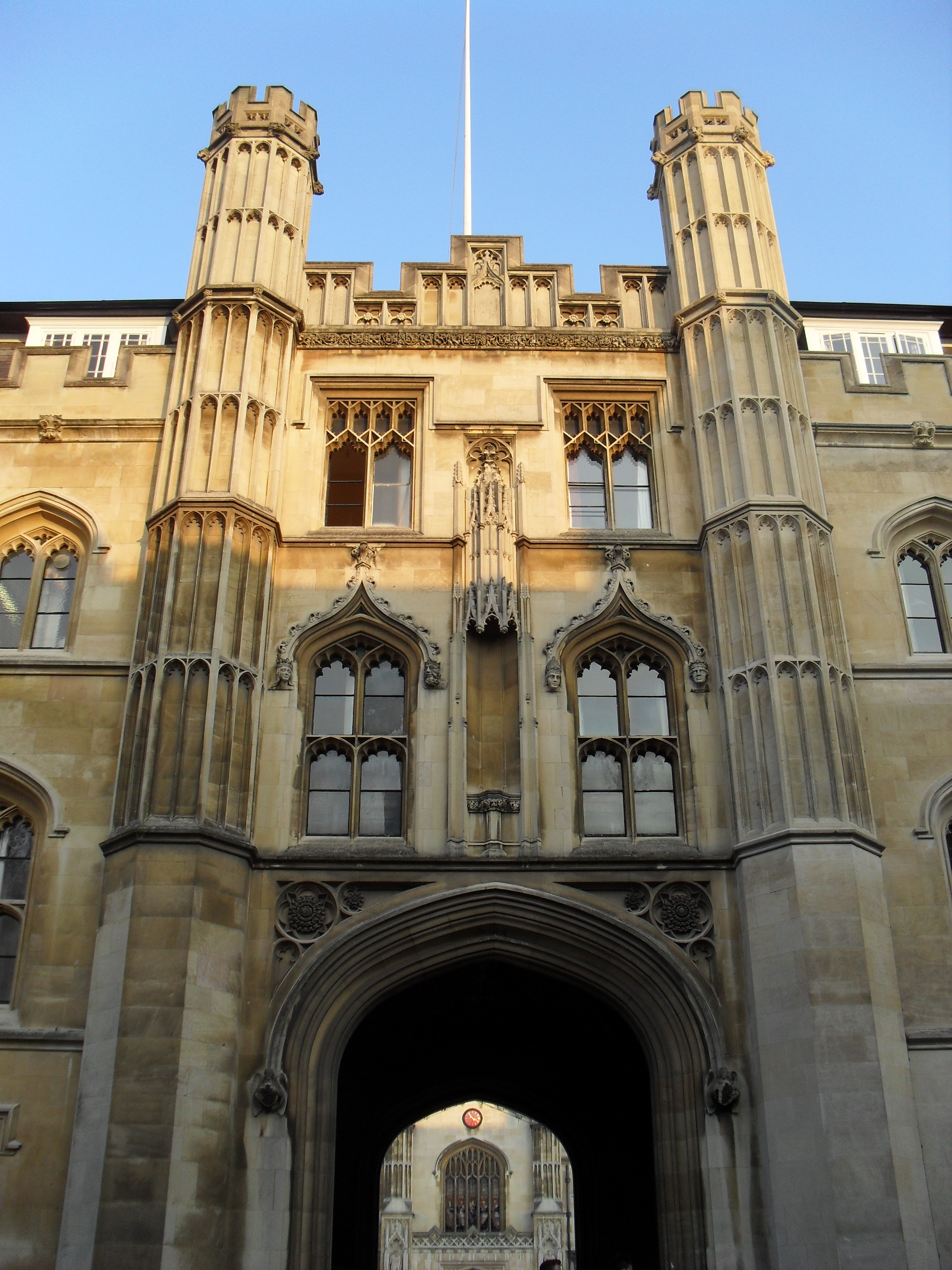
The main gate of the college

=== Foundation ===
The Cambridge guild of Corpus Christi was founded in Cambridge in 1349 by William Horwode, Henry de Tangmere, and John Hardy in response to the Black Death. They determined to found a new college in the University of Cambridge, the sixth in the University's history. Later the same year the new guild merged with an older guild, the Guild of the Blessed Virgin Mary, which had been decimated by the Plague. The united guilds acquired land in the centre of town and their patron, the Duke of Lancaster, applied to King Edward III for a licence to found a new college, which was granted in 1352.

Construction of a single modest court near the parish church began immediately and in 1356 it was ready to house the Master and two fellows. The college's statutes were drawn up in 1356. The united guild merged its identity with the new college, which acquired all the guild's lands, ceremonies, and revenues. The grandest of these ceremonies was the annual Corpus Christi procession: a parade through the streets to Magdalene Bridge, the host carried by a priest and several of the college's treasures carried by the Master and fellows, before returning for an extravagant dinner. The parade continued until the English Reformation, when the Master, William Sowode, put a stop to it in 1535. The college continues to have a grand dinner on the feast day of Corpus Christi, the Thursday after Trinity Sunday.

The newly constructed court could house 22 fellows and students. The statutes laid down the rules governing the behaviour of fellows only. Students were not part of the foundation at this stage and would not come within the scope of the statutes for another 200 years.

=== Name ===
The college's most formal name is the College of Corpus Christi and the Blessed Virgin Mary in the University of Cambridge, usually abbreviated to Corpus Christi College. From the early 16th century, it was also known as Bene't or St Benet's College, from the nearby St Bene't's Church, associated with the founding guild of Corpus Christi. Both the college and the church stand on Bene't Street. Until the late 16th century, the church served as the college chapel, although St Botolph's was also used for some services. When Thomas Cosyn was master of the college in the late 15th century, a gallery was built which linked the college to St Bene't's Church.

By the later 16th century, Bene't College became the name most commonly used, as "Corpus Christi" was deemed to have a very Roman Catholic flavour. This preference continued until the early 19th century.

=== Medieval period ===
In its early centuries, the college was relatively poor and so could not construct new buildings; thus Old Court has survived to the present day. It had no chapel, so the members worshipped in St Bene't's Church next door. From the late 14th century through to the 19th century, particularly during the Reformation when Catholic references were discouraged, Corpus was known as St Benet's College. By 1376 it possessed 55 books, and many more would be donated or bequeathed over the succeeding centuries, including, those bequeathed by Thomas Markaunt and, most significantly, those donated in the 16th century by Archbishop Matthew Parker, who is celebrated by the college as its greatest benefactor.

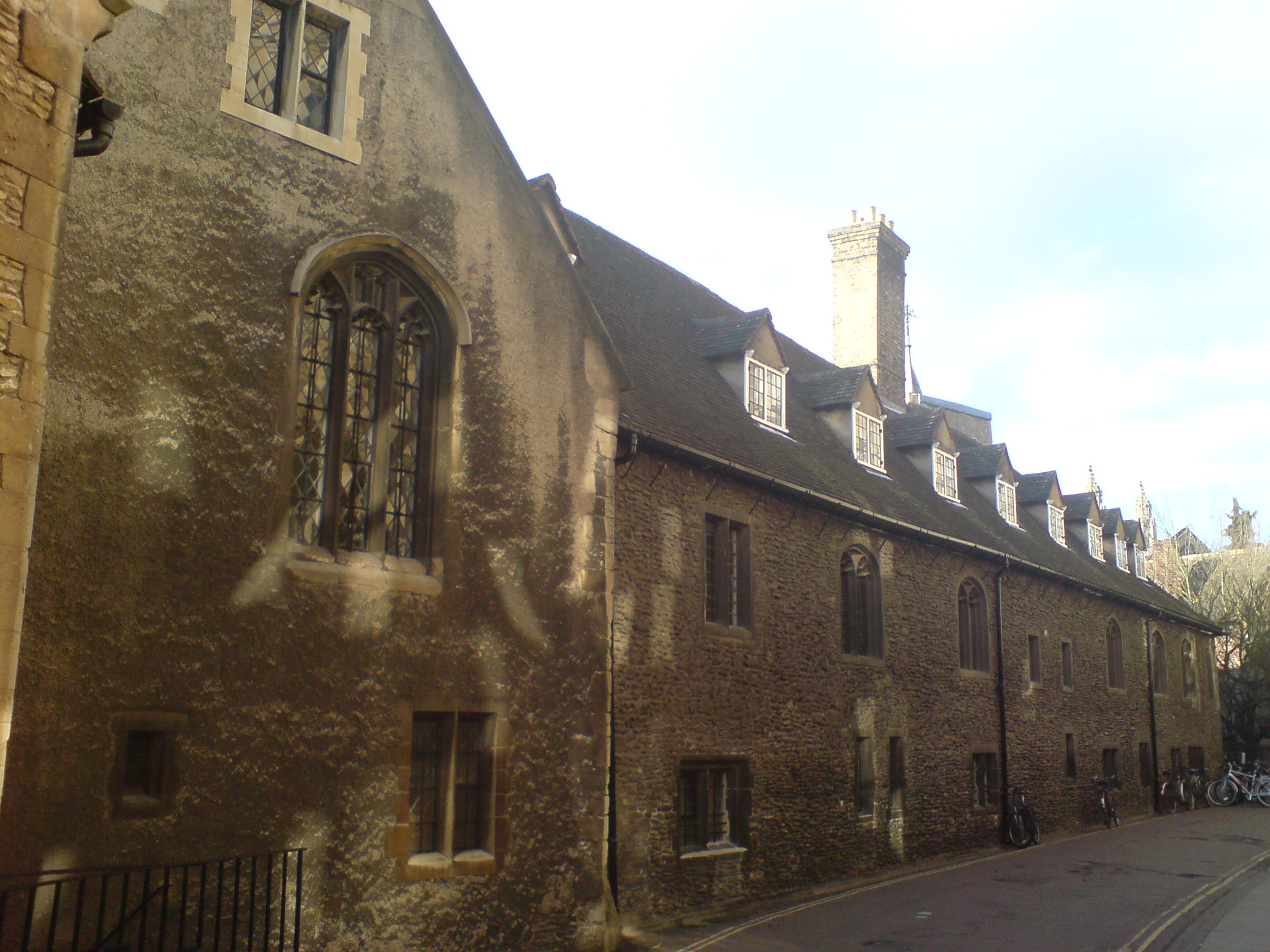
The back of Old Court, built in 1356, seen from outside the Old Cavendish Laboratory

During the Peasants' Revolt in 1381, the college was sacked by a mob of townspeople (and apparently some students) led by the mayor which, according to the college, carried away its plate as well as its charter to be burned while gutting the rest of the college buildings. Corpus was the only University college, although by no means the only University building, to be attacked. The revolt, which ironically took place during the Corpus Christi week, focused on the college as centre of discontent due to its rigid collection of "candle rents". The college claimed £80 (roughly £50,000 in modern terms) in damages.

In 1460 during the Wars of the Roses, the college paid for armaments including artillery and arrows, and protective clothing to defend the college's treasures from a "tempestuous riot".

Elizabeth, Duchess of Norfolk, and her sister Lady Eleanor Botelar née Talbot, who is believed by some to have been secretly married to Edward IV, endowed the college with scholarships in the 1460s and financed repairs to the college buildings. As a monument a 'talbot', the heraldic supporter of the Talbot family, was placed on the gable of Old Court and can still be seen today. At the same time the Master, Thomas Cosyn, built the college's first chapel and a passageway between Old Court and St Bene't's Church. Over the next few centuries, garret rooms were added in Old Court increasing student numbers.

=== Reformation ===
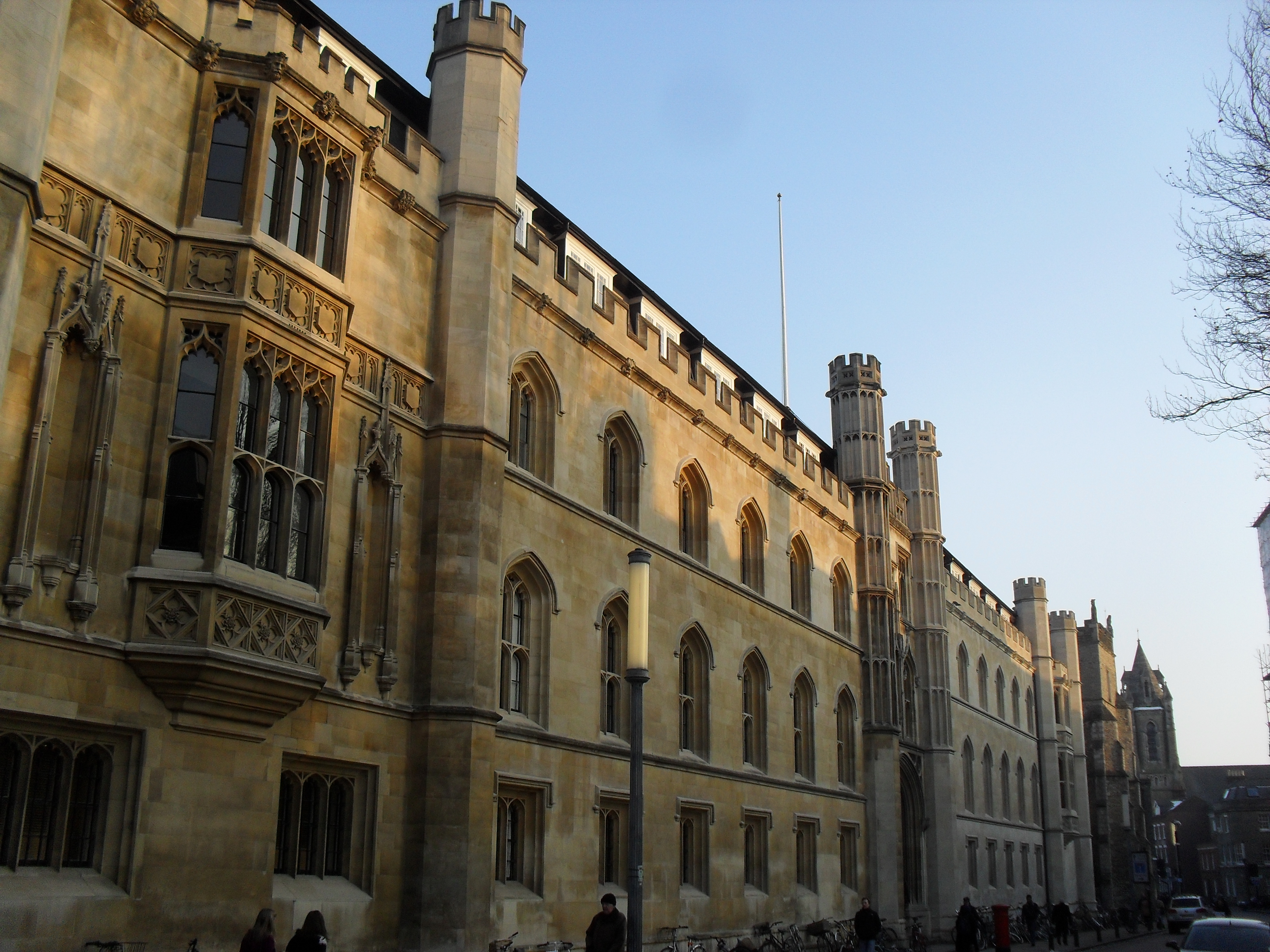
The New Court seen from Trumpington Street

Although spared the worst of the religious tumult that the Reformation brought to England, the college produced adherents and indeed martyrs to both traditions. Notable are William Sowode who cancelled the Corpus Christi procession, St Richard Reynolds who was martyred by Henry VIII, and Thomas Dusgate and George Wishart who were both burned as Protestants.

It was during this time that Matthew Parker became Master. He donated his unrivalled library to the college, much silver plate and its symbol, the pelican. In order to ensure the safety of his collection Parker inserted into the terms of his endowment one which stated that if any more than a certain number of books were lost, the rest of the collection would pass first to Gonville and Caius College, Cambridge, and then (in the event of any more losses) to Trinity Hall, Cambridge. Every few years, representatives from both of those colleges ceremonially inspect the collection for any losses.

Parker placed a similar condition on the silver that he bequeathed to the college and these stipulations are part of the reason why Corpus Christi College retains to this day the entirety of the library and the silver collection: they were unable to sell off (or melt down) the less valuable parts of either collection without losing both. (Parker's assiduousness in his acquisition of books and manuscripts has been suggested as an origin of the phrase "Nosey Parker".) Parker was forced to resign as Master in 1553 by the accession of Mary I but was elected Archbishop of Canterbury upon the succession of Elizabeth I.

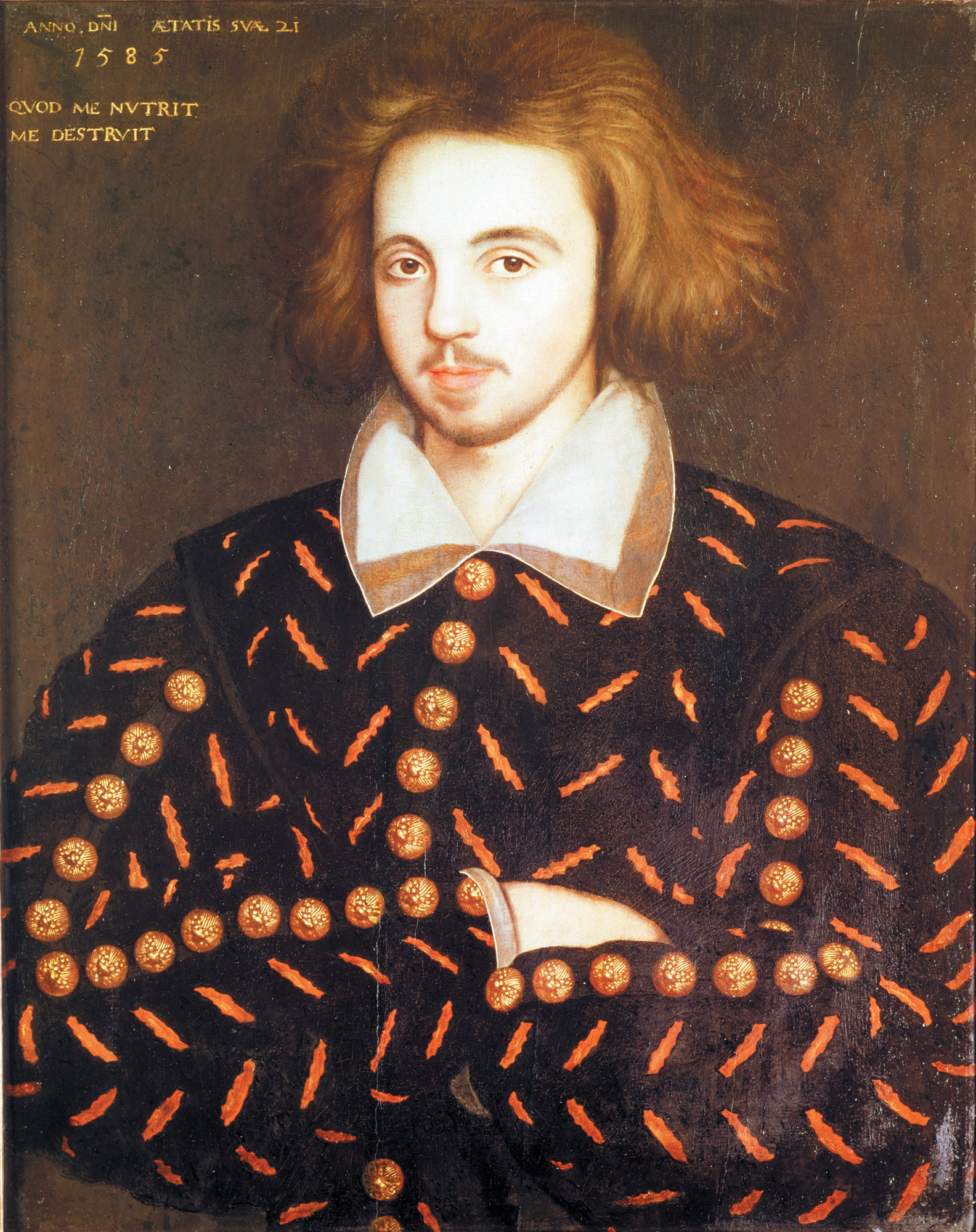
Anonymous 16th-century portrait discovered at the college in 1952 and proposed to depict poet and playwright Christopher Marlowe

The playwright Christopher Marlowe is perhaps the college's most-celebrated son, having matriculated to Corpus in 1580. Although little is known about his time there, it is often believed that it was during his study for his MA that he began his work as a spy, a claim based on only a single cryptic statement by the Privy Council.

In 1952, a portrait of a man "in the 21st year of his age" was discovered during renovation work at the college. As the painting is dated 1585, the year Marlowe was 21, it has been claimed as a portrait of the playwright, of whom no other known portrait exists.

As the number of students rose a bigger chapel became necessary. In 1578 Sir Nicholas Bacon, Lord Keeper of the Great Seal, who had already endowed several scholarships to the college, donated £200 (roughly £30,000 now) for the construction of a new chapel. This sum was not nearly great enough to build a chapel, and despite the efforts of the Master and fellows, the project outran estimates and nearly bankrupted the college. The college sold all of its silver, apart from the gifts from Parker, and the building work was not completed until 1662. Other contributors included Elizabeth I and Sir Francis Drake.

Owing to disputed appointments to the Mastership, Elizabeth I imposed the appointment of John Jegon as Master in 1590. The college did not appoint its own master for some time. Although not the college's choice, Jegon extricated the college from its financial difficulties by instituting fellow commoners, who would stay for one or two years and were never technically members of the university. Their parents were required to pay with a silver cup or tankard, which would then be melted down. The next notable master was Henry Butts, who was also vice chancellor of the university. When the plague returned to the city and the rest of the university had fled, Butts stayed at his post and tried to limit the pestilence while staying alone in the college. He was unrewarded for his bravery and this experience seems to have had a terrible effect on him. In 1632, when Butts failed to turn up to deliver the University Sermon on Easter Day, he was found to have hanged himself.

=== Jacobean period ===
Corpus maintains a collection of silver as it was the only college not to sell its silverware in support of either side during the Civil War. That, and its collection of manuscripts and rare wines and ports, fuels rumours that it is Cambridge's richest college per student. This is a moot point, since these assets cannot be sold and the majority of them cannot be valued.

Unlike other Oxbridge colleges, the college managed to remain neutral during the Civil War. This was due to the ministration of Richard Love who was Master throughout the Civil War and the Commonwealth. According to college legend, the silver plate was distributed to the fellows to keep it from being requisitioned by the warring factions. When the fighting finished the plate was returned and melted down to pay for repairs. Twelve college heads were removed from their posts, but Love and three others were retained. The college also escaped the worst excesses of the puritan Commonwealth. When William Dowsing inspected the college he found "nothing to amend". St Bene't's Church was not so lucky and indeed there was much disturbance in the fellowship as many were forced out and reinstated as circumstances changed through the period.

=== Age of Enlightenment ===
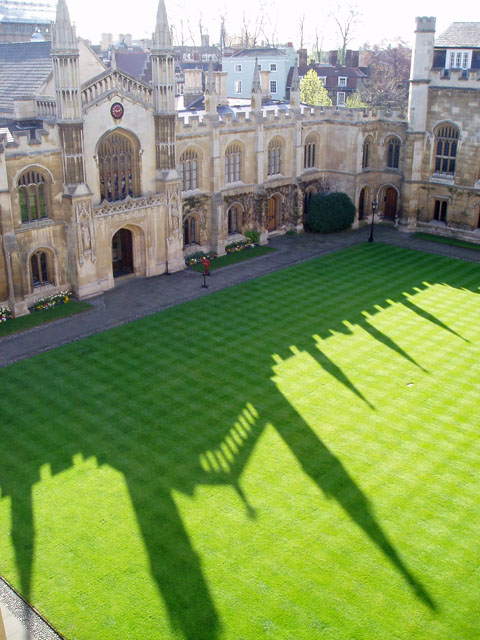
New Court

In 1688, the college was attacked once again by a mob, this time with an anti-Catholic bent. They made for the rooms of the bursar, Clement Scott, whom they suspected of popery. He hid himself from the mob so they destroyed his books and papers. The college continued to grow throughout the 18th century and did produce several distinguished scholars and clergymen including the so-called Benedictine Antiquaries, a dozen or so men all well known for antiquarian research including such figures as Richard Gough and William Stukeley.

In the 1740s, Archbishop Thomas Herring left £1000 for the rebuilding of the college and this led to several abortive attempts to start construction. In 1770 Matthias Mawson, former Master and Bishop of Ely, bequeathed £3000 to defray the costs of demolishing and rebuilding the college but this was not enough. It was not until 1822 when £55,000 had accrued in the rebuilding fund that efforts started. William Wilkins, who had recently completed major works at Downing, King's, and Trinity, was appointed architect and the New Court was completed in 1827 in a neo-Gothic style. This involved the demolition of several buildings, including the Elizabethan chapel. The chapel currently standing in New Court is part of the 19th-century construction. Completion of a new, larger court allowed for many more students and numbers increased from 48 to 100.

=== Victorian Period ===
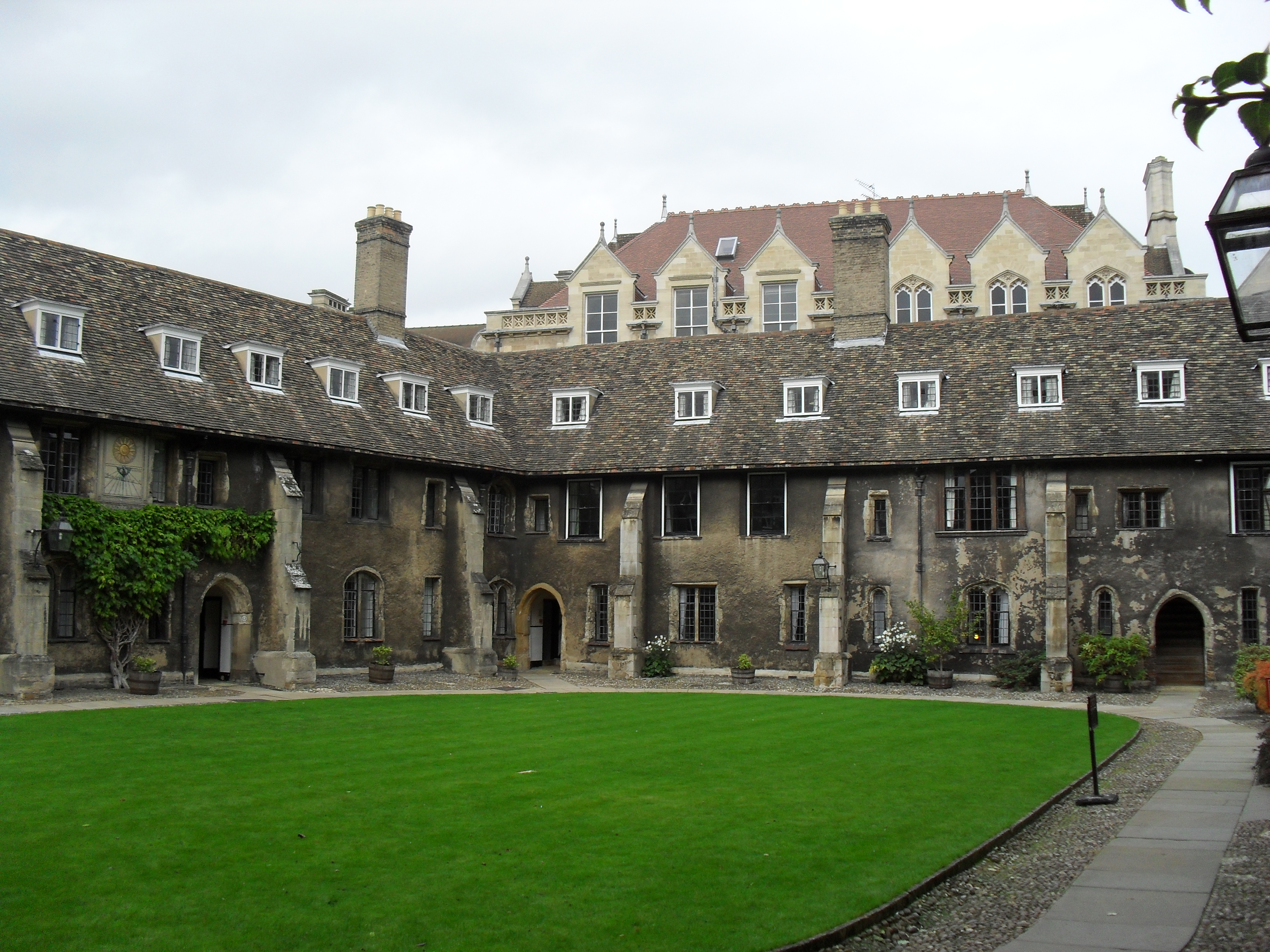
The corner of Old Court. The taller building in the background is the Old Cavendish Laboratory.

During the 19th century the college became associated with the Evangelical religious movement. In the 1860s its popularity grew so great that it became the third largest college in Cambridge. Corpus was always strongly clerical as, at the time, all the fellows had to be in Holy Orders of the Church of England. For many years the majority of the college's graduates went on to be clergymen. However, the university was changing quickly with the repeal of the Test Acts and Catholic emancipation allowing Catholics to join the university for the first time. The syllabus also broadened and the fellow commoners faded away. In 1882, fellows were allowed to marry for the first time. This meant that being an academic fellow could be a lifelong career rather than a stop gap between study and becoming a country parson. Consequently, the demographics of the college fellowship changed significantly during this time. The first married fellow was Edward Byles Cowell who was the first professor of Sanskrit. Later in the century the college fell on hard times and the number of undergraduates dropped to fewer than 50. Around this time the 'Chess Club' was founded which became notorious for hard drinking and partying; it was outlawed in the 1980s.

=== Edwardian period ===
Colonel Robert Caldwell was made Master in 1906 and was the first layman to be appointed to the post. He changed the policy of the college with regard to admittance of fellows and undergraduates, encouraging men from other colleges and outside Cambridge to become fellows. The college was no longer chiefly training men for the clergy. Student numbers increased significantly and a new undergraduate Library named after one of the Burgesses for the university, Geoffrey Butler was completed. The college also began construction of its sports grounds in west Cambridge in 1939.

=== Second World War ===
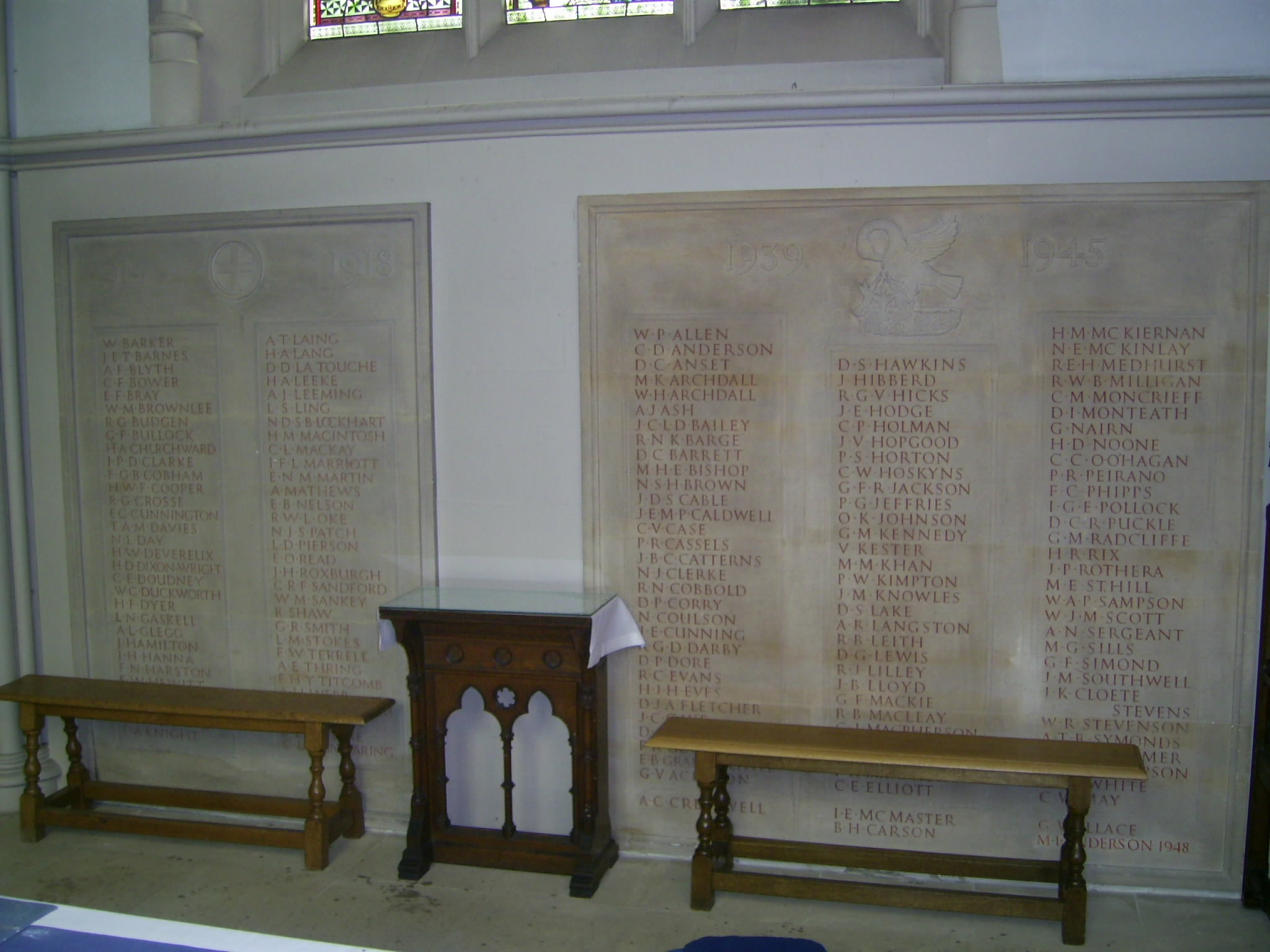
The War Memorial plaques in the college Chapel; unusually, there are more names from the Second World War than the First.

During the Second World War, the Master of the College was Sir Will Spens, who was also Regional Commissioner of Civil Defence for the Eastern Region: had Hitler invaded, he would have been in charge of running Eastern England. The college housed various government departments whilst the then Master was also the Regional Commissioner. Corpus would have hosted the organisation which may have been required to act as an autonomous government authority if central government was incapacitated. This has led to a persistent rumour of a network of tunnels under the college excavated for this purpose. While there are extensive wine cellars, there is no evidence of such tunnels. During the war there were fewer undergraduates in residence, but the space was taken up by cadets and officers of the armed services taking short courses. Due to the increase in student numbers in the 1930s, Corpus is one of the few British institutions to have lost more members in the Second World War than in the First. Their names are inscribed in the Chapel.

Corpus owns The Eagle pub, which is managed by Greene King. Watson and Crick are said to have refreshed themselves in this pub while studying the structure of DNA in the nearby Cavendish Laboratory. Upon making the discovery in 1952, they are said to have walked into the pub and declared, "We have found the secret of life". A blue plaque on the front of the pub commemorates the event. The Eagle is also well known as a haunt for RAF officers in the Second World War; renovations revealed hundreds of signatures, drawings and messages written, or even burnt, onto the walls and ceilings.

=== Modern period ===
During the 1960s, central heating was extended across the entire college campus. Women were also allowed to join the college Chapel Choir and dine in hall. In 1963, the college's first bar was opened in New Court. In 2008, it was moved to Library Court and the old bar was converted into a post room, staffroom and a graduate student common room.

In 1962, the college approved the conversion of the Leckhampton site to allow for more accommodation for fellows and postgraduate students. Further properties were purchased adjacent to the site and a new building, the George Thomson building, named in honour of a former Master, was completed in 1964.

In 1983, women were first admitted as undergraduates. They had been able to become research students and Fellows for a few years before this. In the same year, the college completed building work in Botolph Court, adding further undergraduate accommodation. Similar renovation work was completed in Bene't Court above the Eagle pub in the 1990s along with the creation of the Robert Beldam building.

In recent years, the College has spearheaded the Northern Ireland Initiative. It also has strong links with New Zealand, taking a student on a full scholarship from the country each year, paid for by the Worshipful Company of Girdlers. A former president is the historian and Cold War scholar Christopher Andrew. He also chairs the 'Cambridge Intelligence Seminar' which convenes regularly in rooms.

The current college visitor is the Chancellor of the University of Cambridge, Lord Sainsbury of Turville.

In 2008, the college completed the renovation of an adjacent bank building and other college buildings to create Library Court, the third court within the main college campus.

In January 2012, several pieces of silver worth a total of £11,596 were stolen from the college collection. The items, which included chalices and patens, were taken from the college chapel while it was open to the public. Several pieces worth £956 in total were recovered a fortnight later; the remainder was discovered to have been melted down. A local man was arrested and charged with the theft. None of the pieces lost were part of Parker's bequest.

On 12 July 2017, the Fellowship of the College elected professor Christopher Kelly, president of the college and former senior tutor, as the college's 52nd master. He took up his post in the Michaelmas Term of 2018.

A major restoration of the college's dining hall and servery were undertaken in 2017–18 and completed in February 2019, revealing medieval stonework that had been covered up by the previous restoration in the 1950s.

In July 2019, the college announced that it would create 30 new undergraduate places, specifically aimed at helping students from under-represented backgrounds to take up places at the university.

== Buildings ==
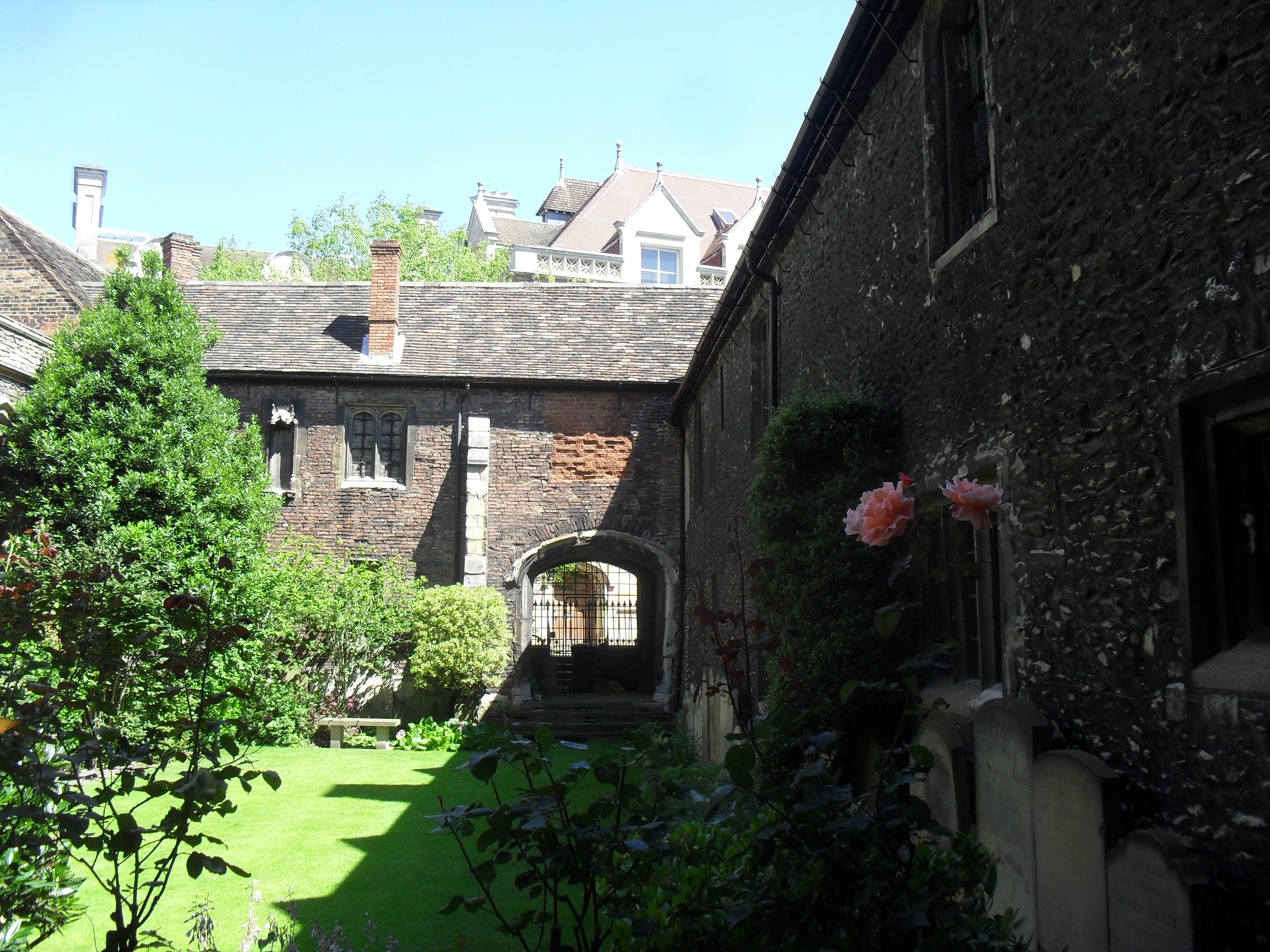
The 16th-century gallery which used to connect Old Court with St Bene't's Church. To the right is Old Court.

=== Old Court ===
Built in the 1350s, Old Court contains some of Cambridge's oldest buildings, and retains many of its original features, such as sills and jambs used to hold oil-soaked linen in the days prior to the arrival of glass. The court is the oldest continually inhabited courtyard in the country (a claim disputed by Merton College, Oxford, which says the same of its Mob Quad). It is possibly built from the core of an even older building. Four sided, it typifies the model of construction of the colleges in Oxford or Cambridge. A passageway connects Old Court to Bene't Street. Due to its age the rooms are large and contain antique furniture but lack basic facilities and plumbing. In 1919 the ivy was removed from Old Court and a roughcast rendering was put in its place, followed by a major restoration in 1952 paid for by donations from old members.

During the summer months students are permitted to sit on the lawn in Old Court and garden parties may be held whereas, like other Oxbridge colleges, normally only fellows are allowed to walk on the lawns. There is a large plaque, on the northern wall, dedicated to Christopher Marlowe and John Fletcher, both famous playwrights who studied at Corpus. Standing inside Old Court one can see the tower of St Bene't's Church, the oldest building in Cambridge, and the Old Cavendish Laboratory where the structure of DNA was solved by Watson and Crick and groundbreaking work on the structure of the atom was conducted by J. J. Thomson and Ernest Rutherford. Around 1500, the master, Thomas Cosyn built a brick gallery which connects Old Court with St Bene't's Church; the gallery is now part of an Old Court room set.

=== St Bene't's Church ===
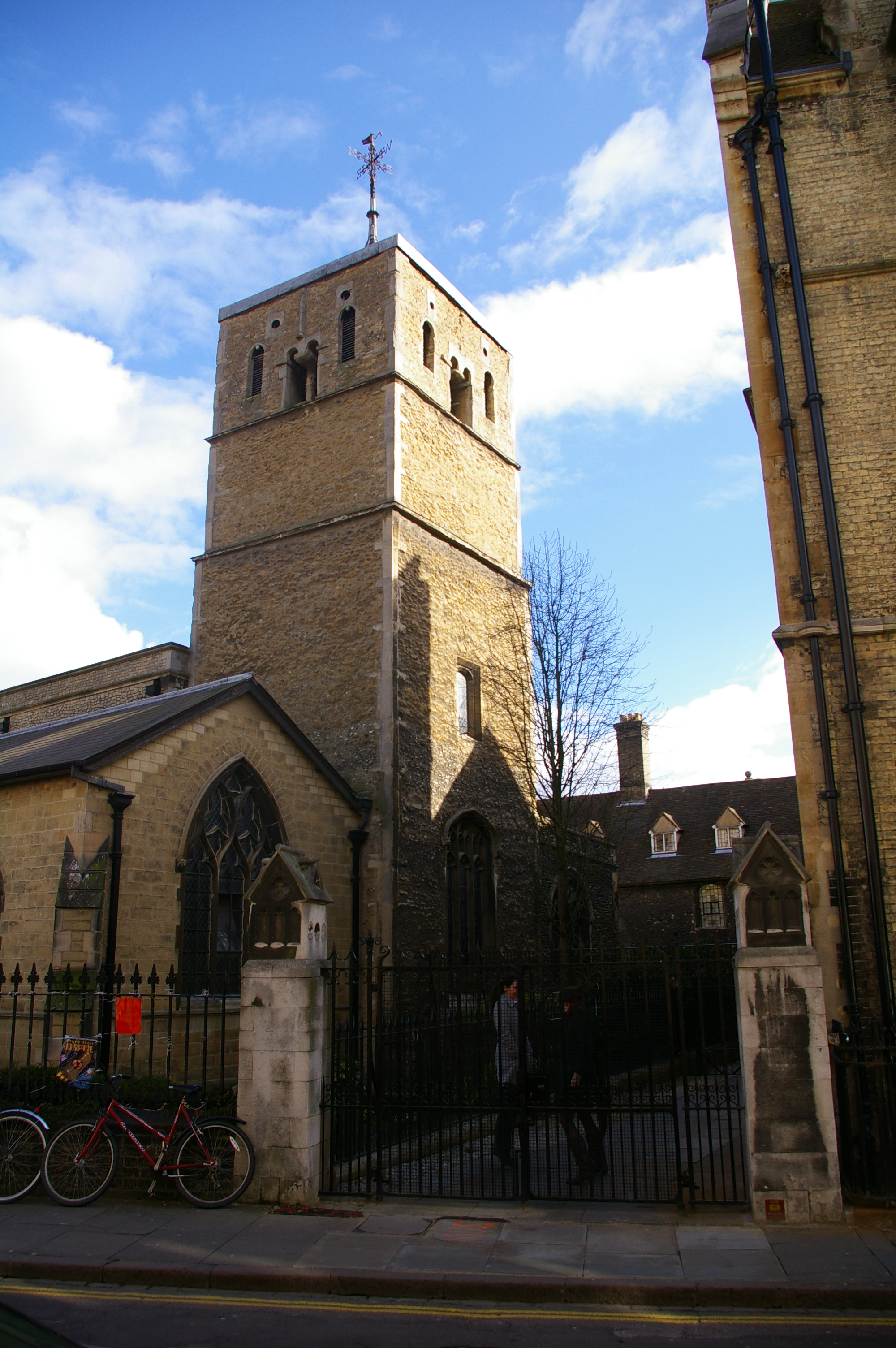
St Bene't's Church with its Anglo-Saxon tower viewed from Bene't Street. To the right, one can see the passage leading into Corpus.

The adjacent St Bene't's Church served as the college's chapel until 1579 when one was built. The college remains the patron of the church. The tower of St Bene't's is the oldest building in Cambridge, dating back to before the Norman Conquest, built in the late Anglo-Saxon period. Fabian Stedman, a pioneer in the development of change ringing, was appointed parish clerk to St Bene't's in 1670.

=== New Court ===
New Court (completed 1827) was designed by William Wilkins, who is buried in the vaults of the college chapel. Although he went on to design the curtain wall in front of King's College, Cambridge and the National Gallery in London, he considered Corpus to be his favourite work and requested to be buried in the Chapel. A plaque commemorating him is in the entrance to the Parker Library within the court. This court also housed the Butler Library, the college's student library, directly below the Parker Library. Upon completion of the building works in 2008, it relocated to the new Library Court and was renamed the Taylor Library after the project's main benefactor John Taylor. Many of the more precious volumes in the Parker Library are now protected in vaults in what used to be the Butler Library. New Court was built to symbolise the harmony between the mind, body and soul with the Parker Library on the right representing the mind, the Hall and kitchens on the left representing the body and the Chapel in the centre representing the soul.

==== Chapel ====
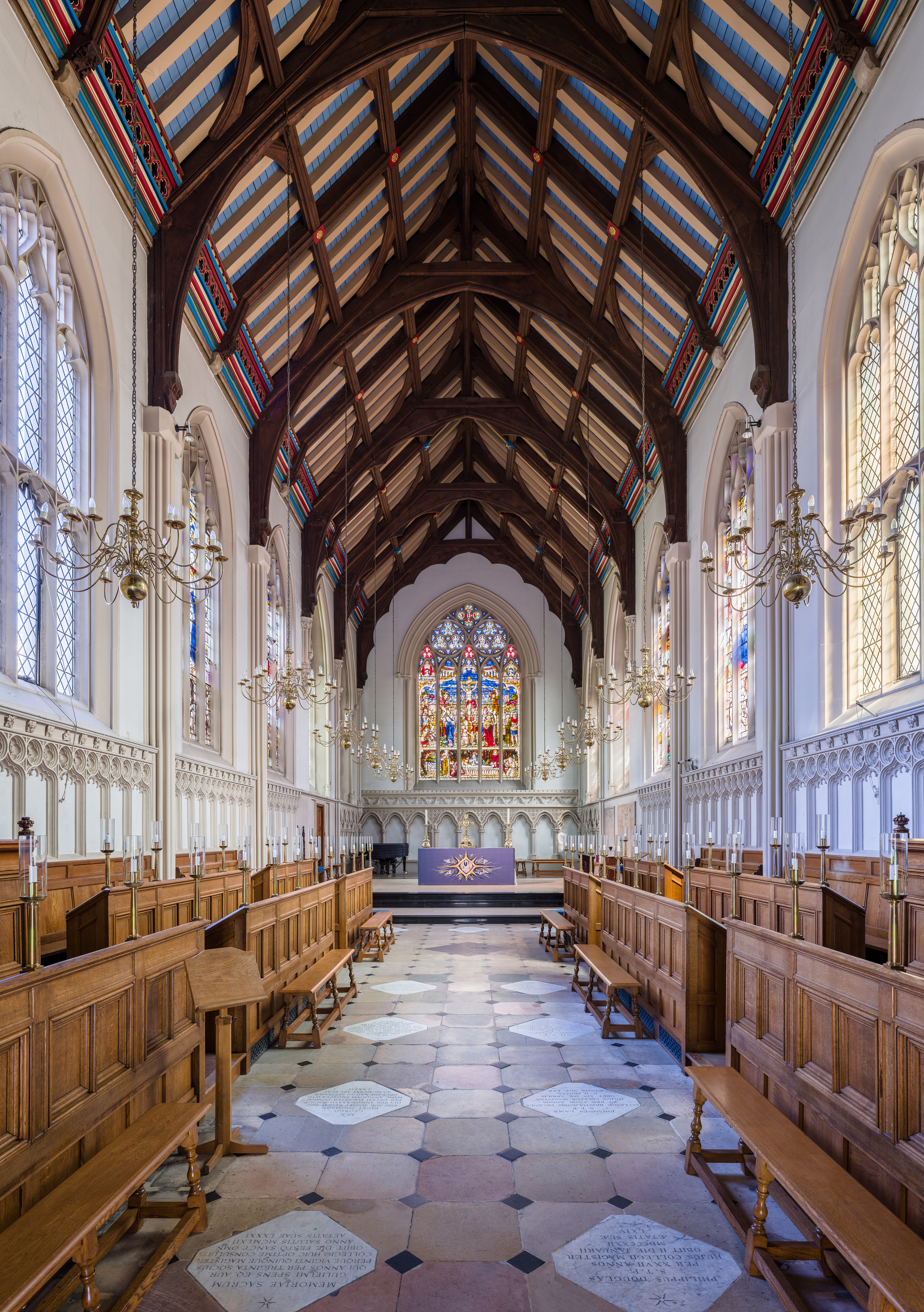
The interior of the college chapel viewed from the west door facing the altar

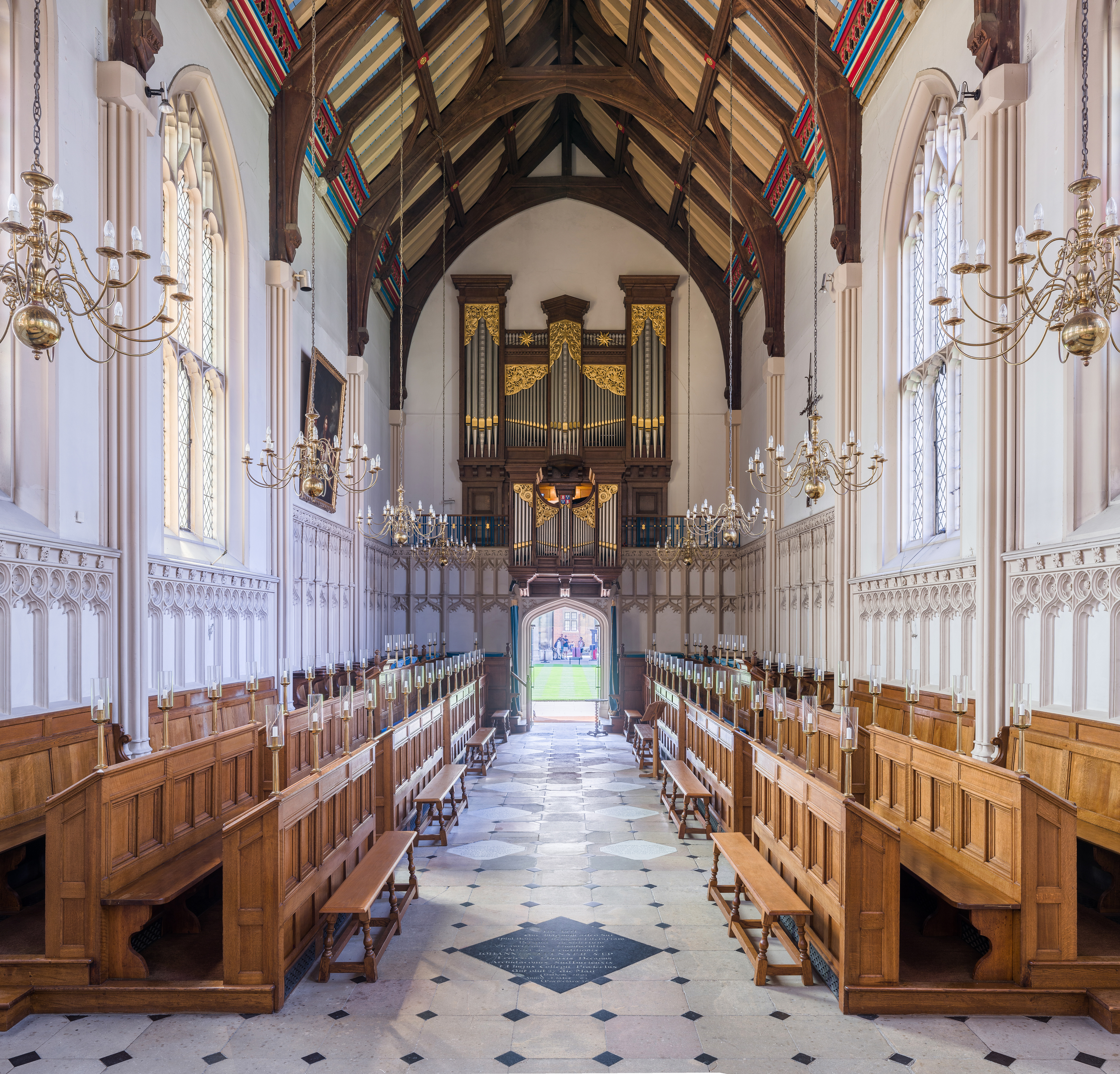
The chapel looking back towards the organ and entrance

The current Chapel is the third the college has had and was completed in 1827 along with the rest of New Court. It was also designed by William Wilkins, but includes some medieval glass and features, including the fellows' stalls, several memorials and the floor of the older Elizabethan Chapel, which was demolished in the construction of New Court. The first four stained glass windows date to around 1500 and are believed to come from the Abbey of Mariawald in Germany which had been dissolved by Napoleon. Some of the pews and the pulpit of the Elizabethan chapel can now be found in St Andrew's Church, Thurning, Norfolk. Hanging on the south wall is a depiction of the Madonna and Child by 17th-century artist Elisabetta Sirani. The Chapel also features an icon, something unusual for an Oxbridge college. The depiction of the Christ Pantocrator was painted for the college by a Greek Orthodox monk and is used as a focus for meditation.

The Chapel was extended in the late 19th century to make room for increasing student numbers, and the chancel dates from this time. The ceiling, which had been a stone fan-ribbed vault like the ceiling of the college gatehouse, was replaced by the painted wooden ceiling still in place today.

Services are held daily and there are sung services three times a week: Evensong on a Wednesday evening, and on Sunday Holy Communion in the morning and Evensong in the evening. The Chapel choir is made up of students from both Corpus and other colleges in the university. They have released several CDs and tour regularly, previously visiting New York City and Italy.

The current organ was built by Noel Mander in 1968 and the casework was designed by Stephen Dykes Bower. The previous organ was donated to Methodist College Belfast on their centenary in 1968.

==== Parker Library ====
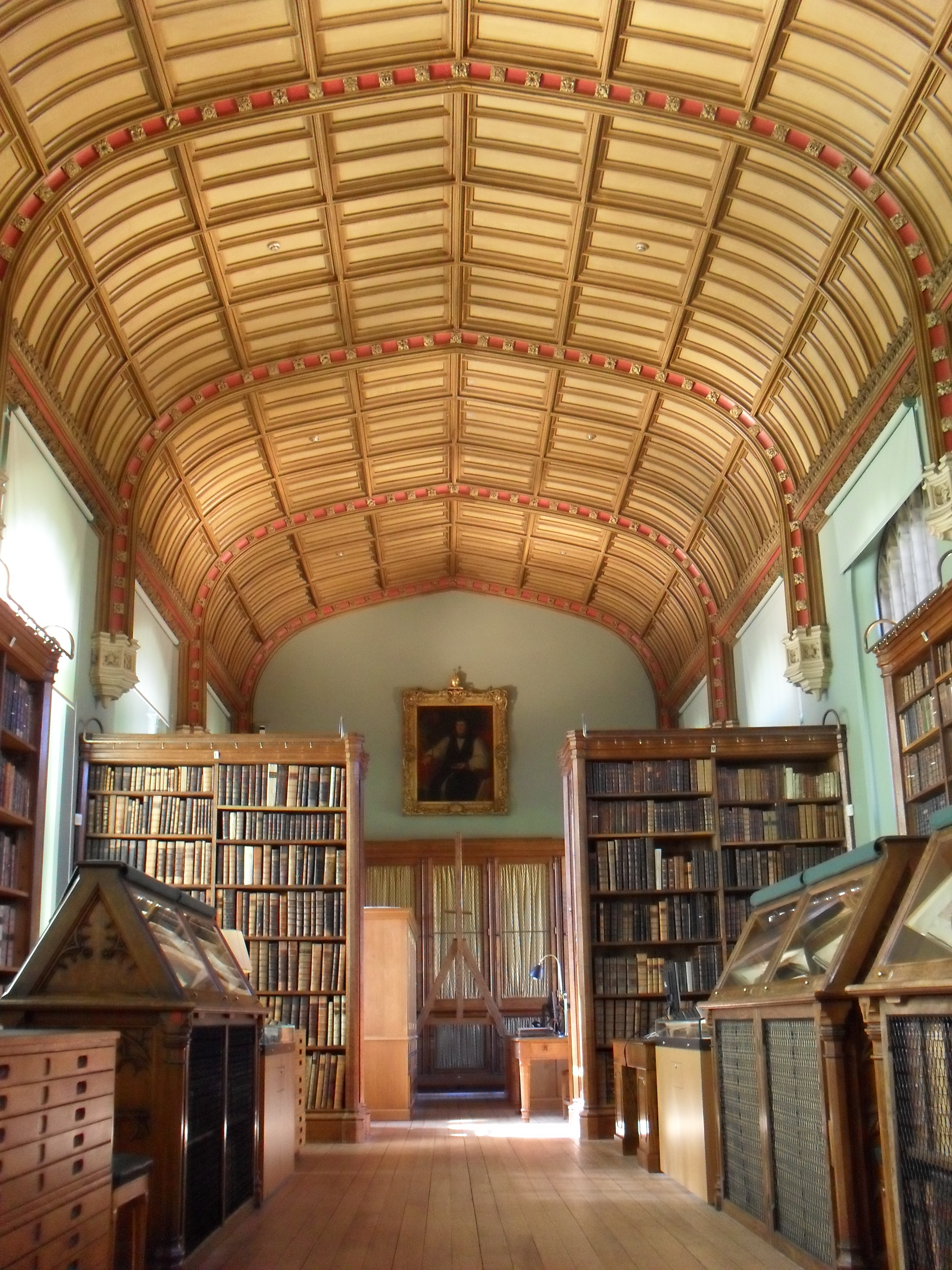
A view along the Wilkins Room in the Parker Library

The collection was begun in 1376 and much improved by a bequest from Matthew Parker, the college's Master between 1544 and 1553, who, as Archbishop of Canterbury, formed a fine collection of manuscripts from the libraries of dissolved monasteries.

The Parker Collection is one of the finest and most important collections of medieval manuscripts in the world. It has been suggested that Parker may have enjoyed the protection of Sir Rowland Hill of Soulton, Shropshire, during his period of disfavour under Mary I, when this collection would have been in danger, along with Parker himself; Hill was the publisher of the Geneva Bible and joined Parker as a Commissioner for Ecclesiastical Cases in 1559.

The building was completed in 1827 in the construction of Wilkin's New Court. The collection comprises over 600 manuscripts, around 480 of which were given by Parker, who also donated around 1000 printed volumes.

Its most famous possession is the St Augustine Gospels, probably brought to England by St Augustine, when he was sent by Pope Gregory I to convert the people of Britain in 598 AD. The Gospels are still used in the enthronement of the Archbishops of Canterbury today and are transported to and from Canterbury by the Master and college representatives. It also contains the principal manuscript of the Anglo-Saxon Chronicle, works by Matthew Paris, and Chaucer's Troilus and Criseyde, to name only a few.

In a joint venture between the college, the University Library and Stanford University in the United States, the entire collection was digitised and is now available on the internet. Completed in 2010, the process involved the digitisation of over 200,000 separate pages.

=== Kwee Court (formerly Library Court) ===
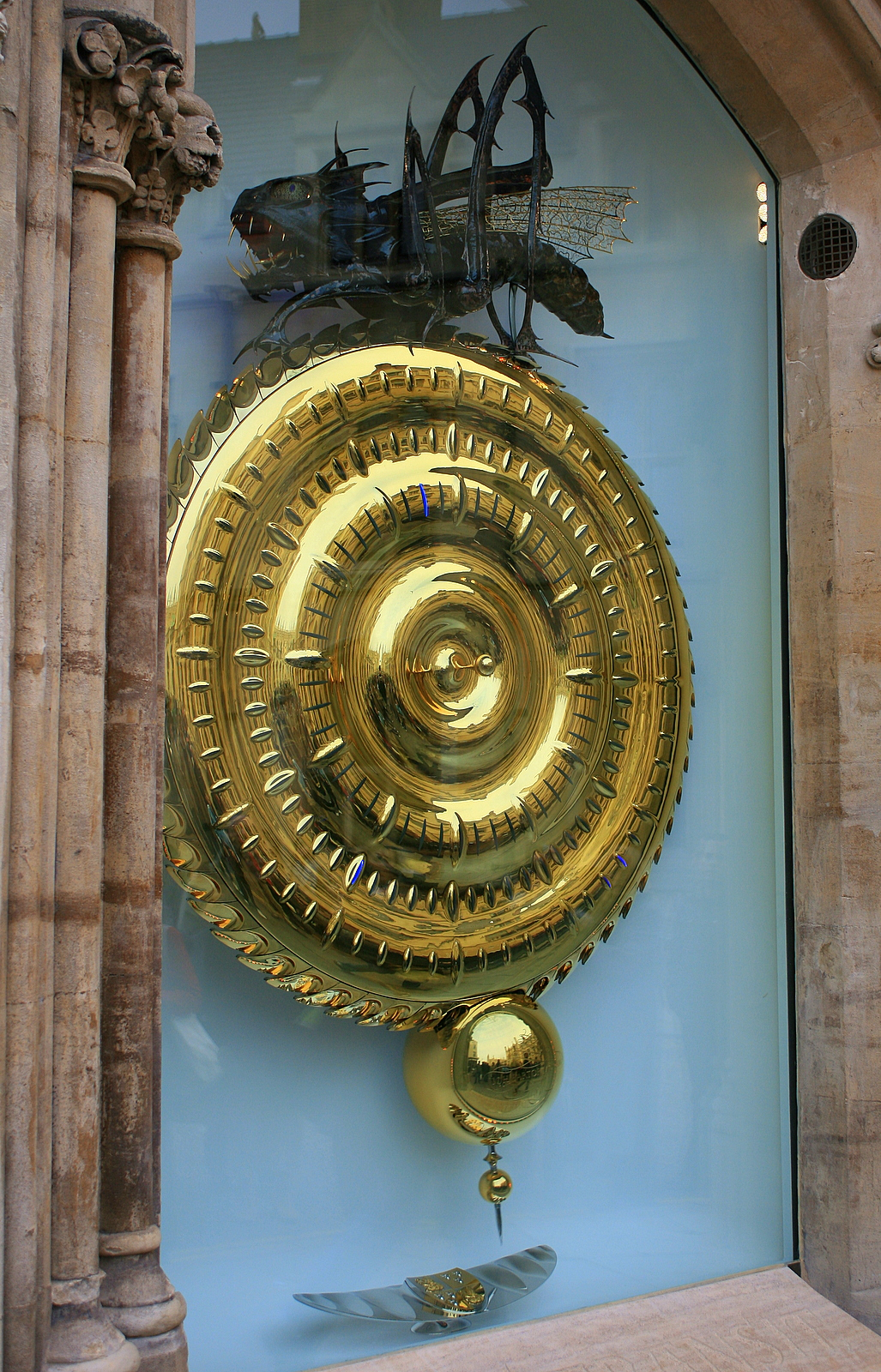
The Chronophage with its distinctive face and grasshopper

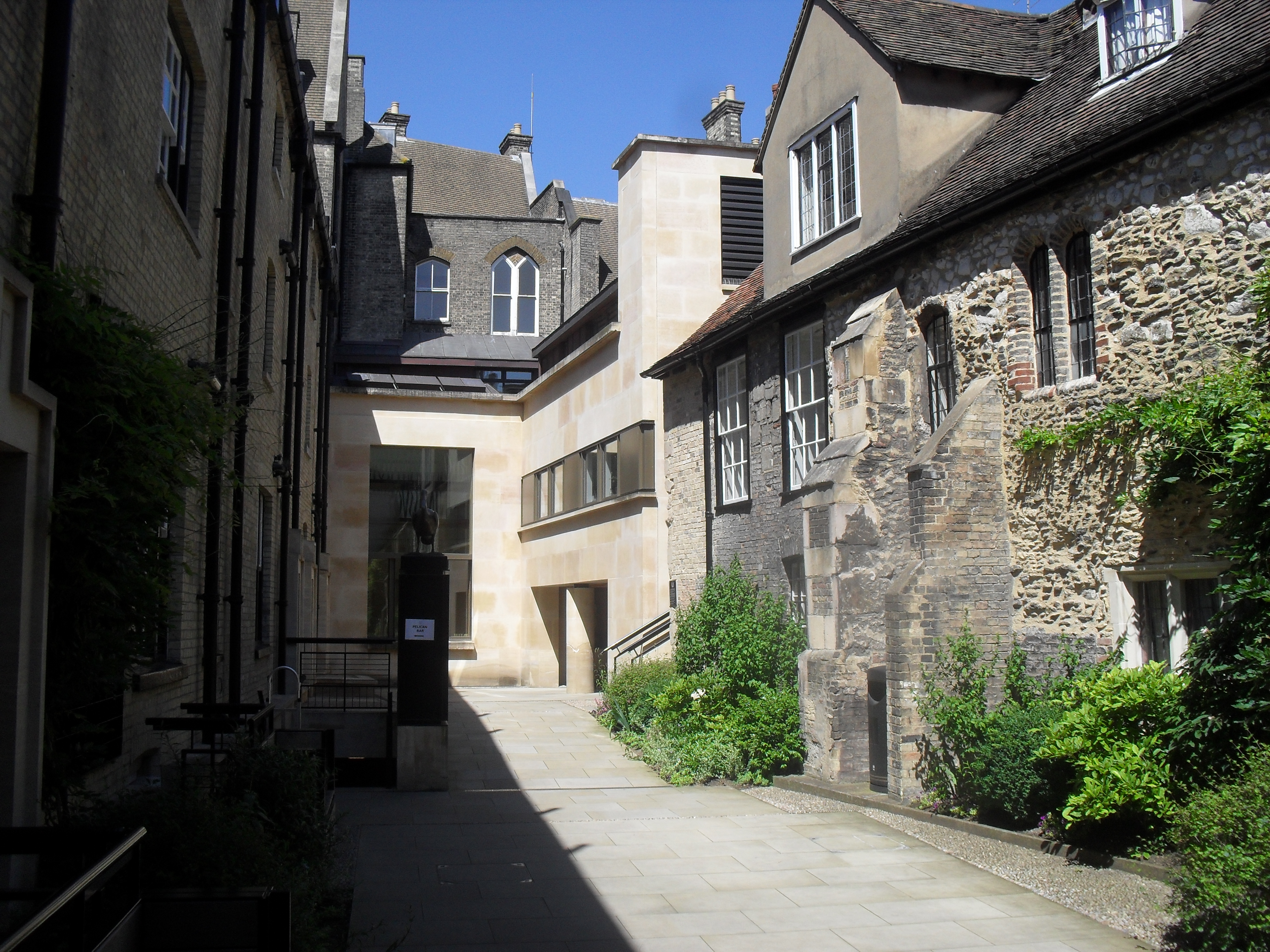
Library Court

In 2005, the lease of the bank adjacent to Corpus expired and the college reclaimed it to begin construction of Library Court. Due to be completed in 2007, the project overran due to archaeological finds and issues removing the bank vault.

Library Court was completed in January 2008 and houses the college's student centre which includes the college bar, JCR and the Taylor Library along with new college offices. The Taylor Library was largely funded by and named after John Taylor, a former graduate of the college, inventor of the cordless kettle and former chairman of Strix Ltd, an electric kettle thermostat manufacturer.

While the outer facade of the bank building facing onto Trumpington Street, designed by architect Horace Francis, is Grade II listed, the interior was not. The inside was stripped out and a modern library was installed. The other rooms including the bar, student rooms, fellows rooms and student centre were remodelled within the existing building. Facing onto Library Court from the Taylor Library is a large window decorated by an engraving by Lida Kindersley. The project was designed by Wright & Wright Architects of London. The building has received several awards including the 2009 Royal Institute of British Architects Award in the East.

On 19 September 2008, physicist Stephen Hawking unveiled a new clock called the Chronophage, which means "Time Eater" in Greek. It is situated facing onto the corner of King's Parade and Trumpington where the old entrance to the bank used to be. The clock is unusual not only because of its design but also because it is accurate only once every five minutes. The clock was conceived, designed and paid for by Taylor and donated to his alma mater. The clock is neon lit at night.

In 2013, the Library Court was renamed Kwee Court after a large financial donation was made to the college. Students and fellows, however, continue to refer to the court by its traditional name. The donation – made by the Kwee family – was made on the condition that a balcony was built somewhere in the college. As most of the college buildings are Grade I listed, the only practical space for a balcony was in library court. The balcony (Kwee Balcony) is at the far end of the court from the entrance to the library.

=== Leckhampton ===
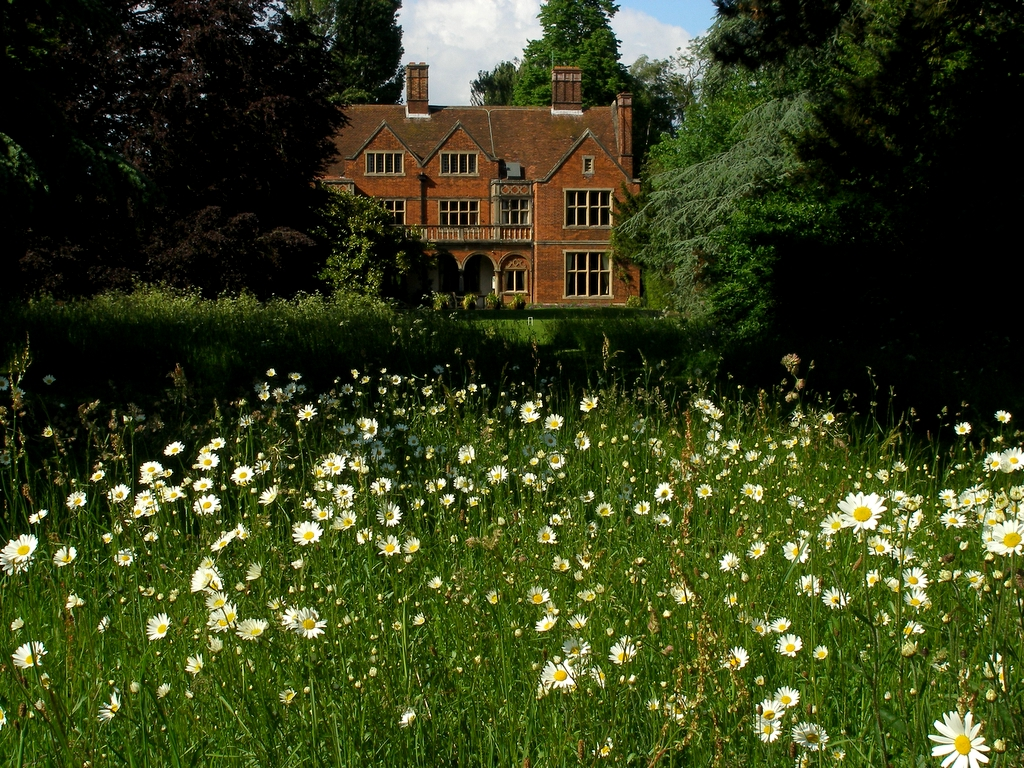
Leckhampton House viewed from the gardens

Leckhampton is a large, separate campus for postgraduate students. It is situated about a mile west of the main College site (which is referred to by postgraduate students as the 'Old House', to differentiate it from Leckhampton), just outside the city centre and is set off Grange Road. Here there are playing fields, 9½ acres (38,000 m^{2}) of gardens and an open-air swimming pool. The site is made up of a Victorian mansion called Leckhampton House and the Grade-II listed George Thomson Building, as well as five substantial detached houses on Cranmer Road, one house on Selwyn Gardens, and one house on Barton Road; all other than Barton Road back on to communal gardens and constitute a single site. In 2012, a new, purpose-built accommodation building was built to house additional students. The new Kho Building was opened on 14 September 2012 by the College Visitor and Chancellor of the University, the Lord Sainsbury of Turville. The site is known by students of the College as 'Leck'.

=== Other buildings and gardens ===
There are several outlying college properties. These include Bene't Street Hostel, above The Eagle, Newnham House, located near to Newnham College and Botolph Court.

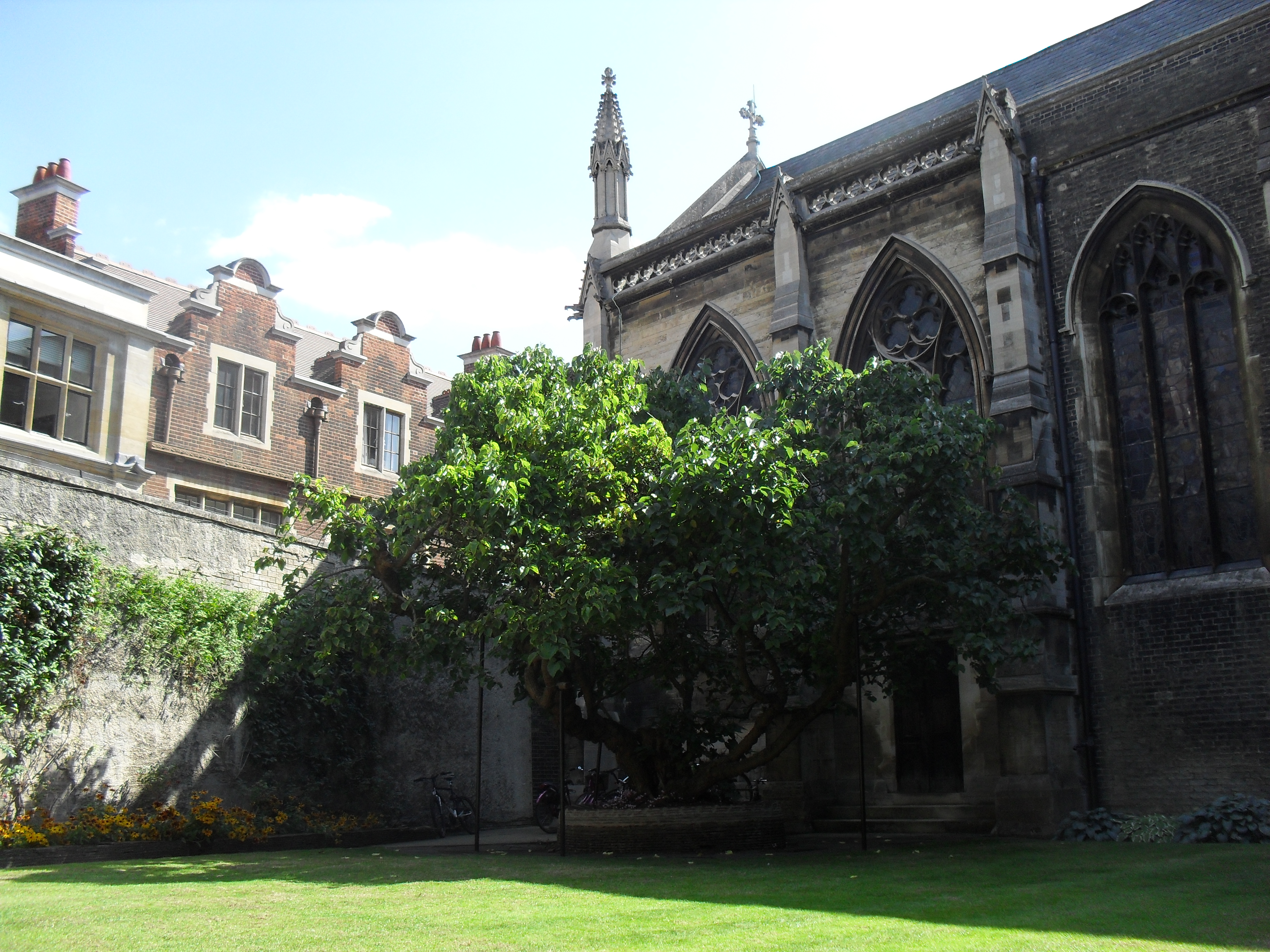
The Bursars garden including the mulberry tree donated by James I

The Robert Beldam Building, adjacent to Bene't Street Hostel, is a modern accommodation block completed in the 1990s. It includes the McCrum Lecture Theatre. Additionally, the college owns two houses (Nos. 6 & 8) in Trumpington Street, known in the college as "T" Street, which are almost directly opposite the University Engineering Department.

Between Trumpington Street and Library Court are a series of terraced houses, also designed by Wilkins, owned by the college. All have been reclaimed by the college for use as student rooms or part of the Library except for the block used by the Trumpington Street Medical Practice. The doors leading from Trumpington Street have been sealed and the buildings can only be entered through Library Court.

There are two main gardens in the main college campus, the Bursar's Garden and the Master's Garden, the latter being the private garden of the Master and his family attached to the Master's Lodge. The Bursar's garden is a small garden situated between New Court, the Chapel and Old Court. Students are allowed to sit there throughout the Easter term at certain times of day. It is notable for the mulberry tree which was given to the college by King James I as part of his abortive attempt to found a silk industry in England. There is a door leading out onto Free School Lane accessible through the Bursar's Garden.

=== Gallery ===
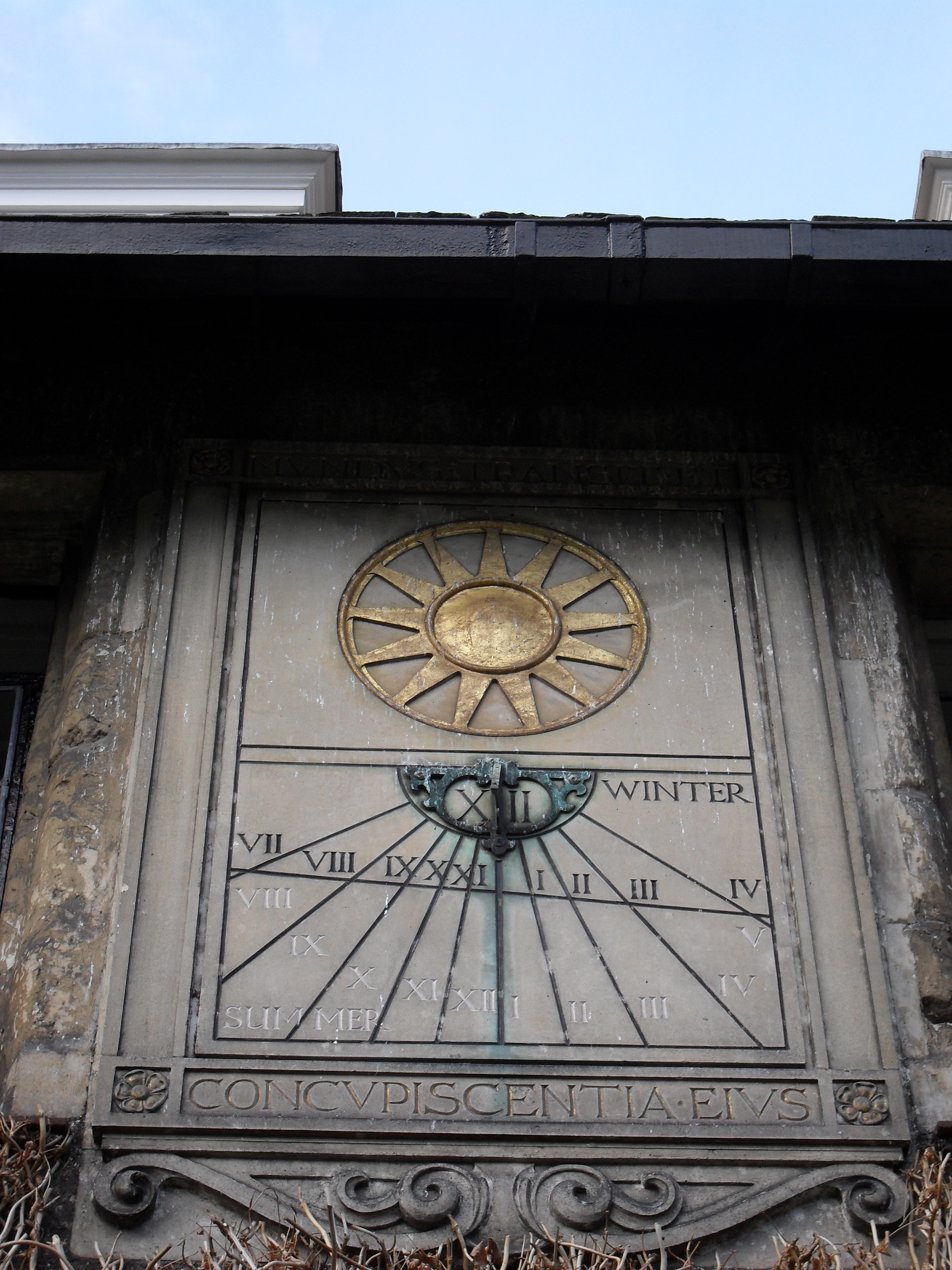
The sundial in Old Court

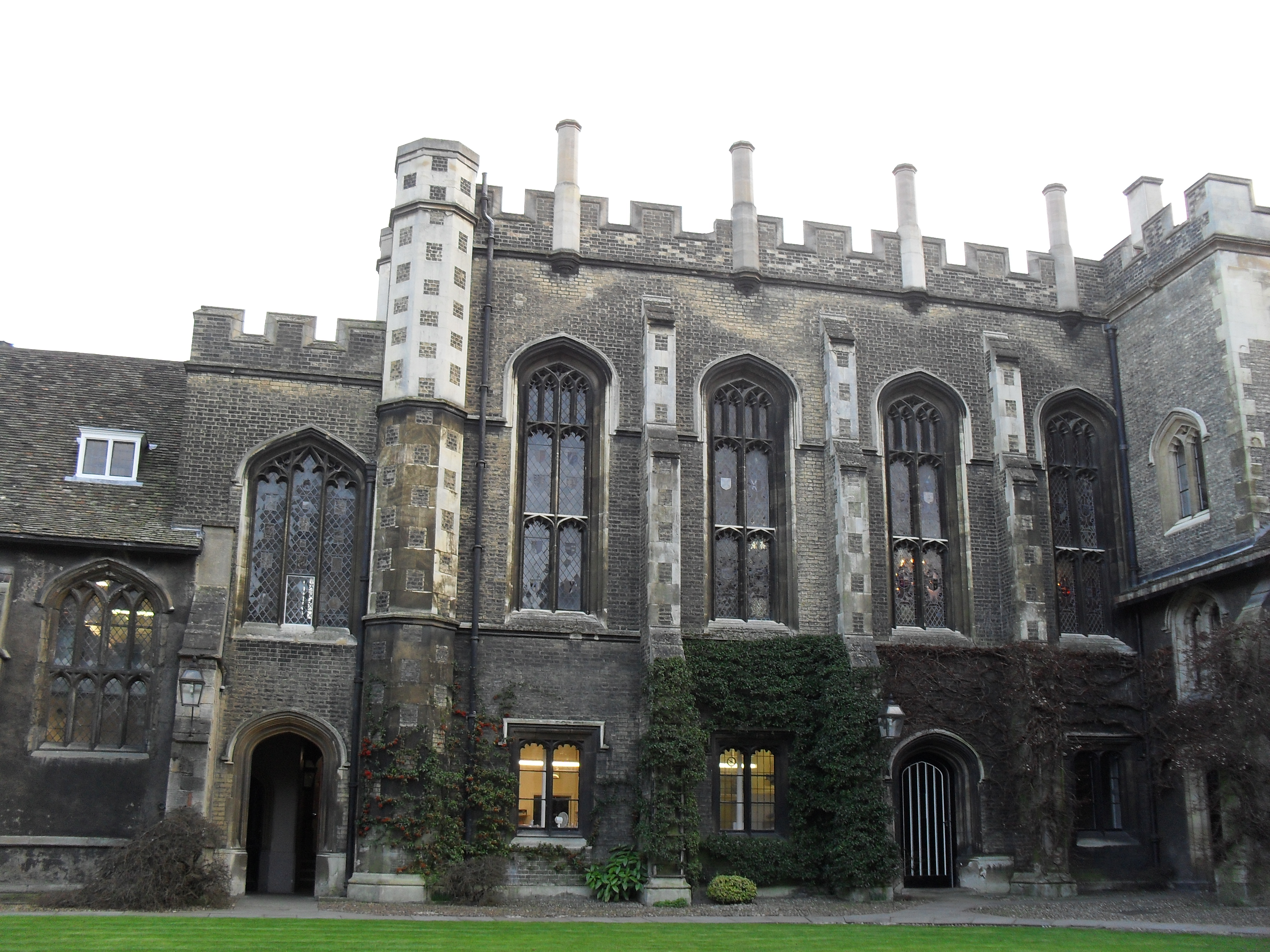
The Dining Hall seen from Old Court

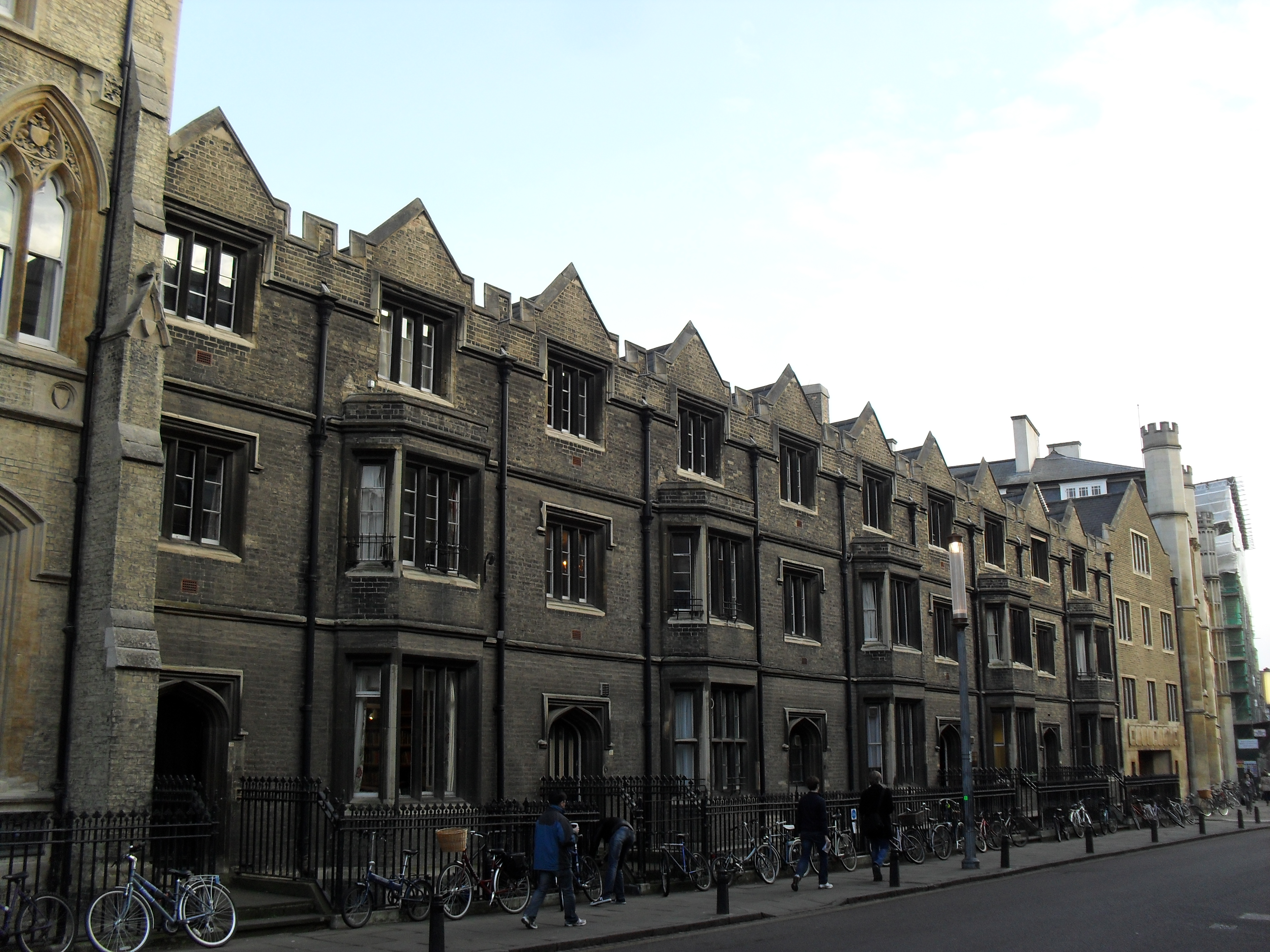
The terraced houses between New Court and the Taylor Library

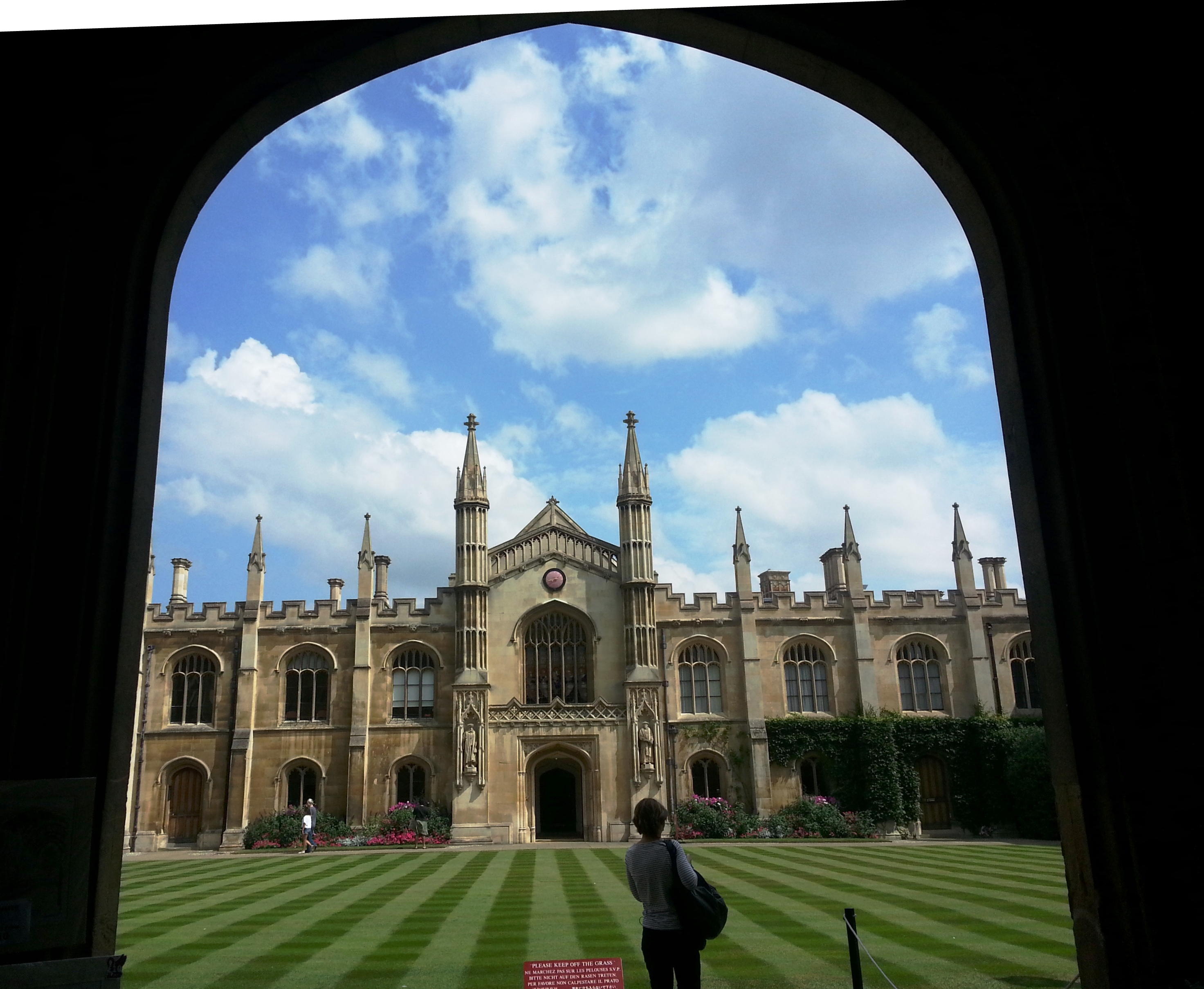
The entrance to the college

== Student life ==
Corpus Christi rowing in the May Bumps

Most of the undergraduates, who refer to themselves as Corpuscles, live in or very near the main college campus. Unlike most other colleges there is a dedicated accommodation site for graduates in Leckhampton.

As with all Cambridge colleges, Corpus has its own student unions (combination rooms) for both undergraduates and graduates, the JCR and MCR respectively. The JCR (Junior Combination Room) is also the name for the entire student body 'en masse' (including the graduates) and the name of the student common room as well. On 14 November 2010, the JCR and MCR student bodies disaffiliated from CUSU, after holding a College-wide ballot in which 71% of undergraduates and 86% of postgraduates that voted were in favour of disaffiliation.

In 2008 the college bar was relocated from New Court to an underground position in the newly built Library Court. It hosts regular themed parties known in Corpus slang as a slack, (e.g. the Hallowe'en slack).

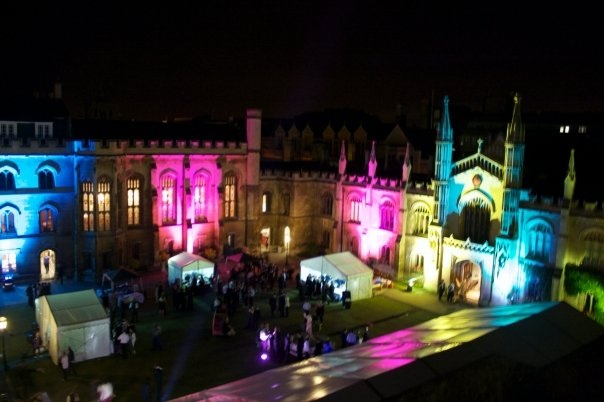
New Court during Corpus's 2009 May Ball, "The Grand Tour"

Corpus hosts a biennial May Ball on the Friday of May Week.

Each spring a duck chooses to lay her eggs in a flower pot in Old Court some 200 m from the River Cam. When the ducklings hatch and are ready to leave for the water one of the porters must stop traffic on Trumpington Street to allow the duck and her offspring to cross. The porters from St Catharine's across the road open the gates of their college and take over the responsibility of getting them to the river from there.

=== Corpus challenge ===
Every year Corpus competes with its sister college in Oxford, also called Corpus Christi, in the Corpus Challenge. Both colleges compete in many sports including football, rugby, hockey and rowing races as well as darts, table tennis, pool and board games. Winning an individual sport accrues a set number of points with the totals deciding the overall winners. The location of 'The Challenge' alternates between the colleges every year. In 2017, it was held in Oxford, who won the cup on home soil.

=== Playroom ===
The Corpus Playroom is a student theatre situated on St Edward's Passage. It opened in 1979 and was, until 2001, run solely by the students of Corpus Christi. In 2011 the ADC Theatre took over the management of the Playroom, working alongside the college and the Fletcher Players, the college drama society, named after the Corpus alumnus and playwright, John Fletcher. The Playroom has an important place in the drama landscape of Cambridge, being the only other permanent student venue apart from the ADC. Several notable performers and directors have played there including Emma Thompson, Hugh Bonneville (alumnus of Corpus Christi), Sam Mendes and Stephen Fry, who is the Playroom's patron and whose play Latin! or Tobacco and Boys was commissioned for it in 1979. The Playroom is undergoing a fund-raising campaign to renovate and expand its facilities.

== Traditions and anecdotes ==
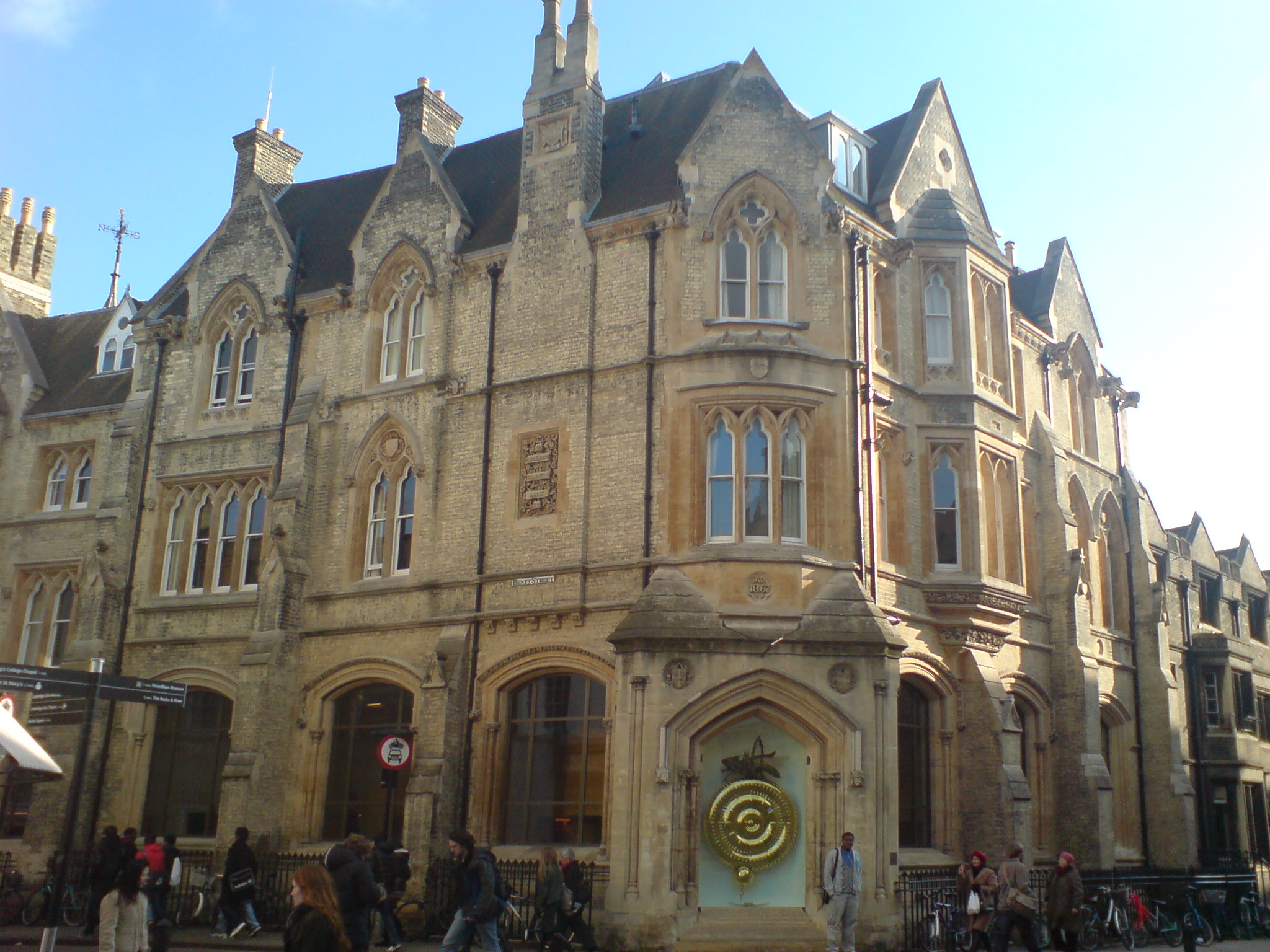
The Taylor Library and the Corpus Clock on the north-western corner of the college

=== Coat of arms ===
The college's coat of arms consists of a quartered shield featuring a pelican on a red background in the top left and bottom right corners and three white lilies on a blue background in the top right and bottom left corners.

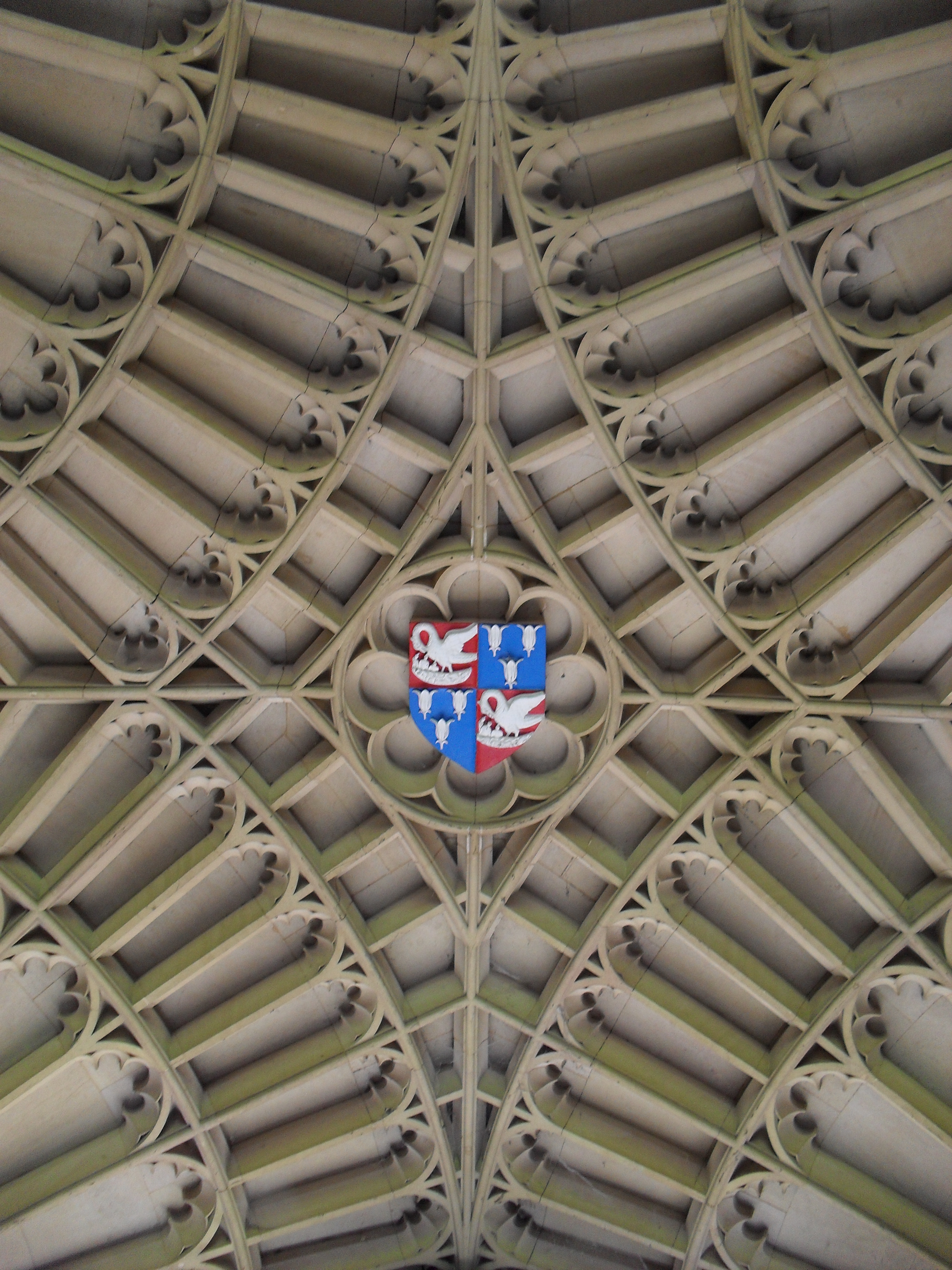
The arms of the college over the main gate

The coat of arms was granted in 1570 by Robert Cooke, Clarencieux King of Arms, at the request of the Master, Archbishop Matthew Parker. It was by this that Parker introduced into the college the symbol of the mythical pelican with the body of a swan and the head of an eagle. It was believed in the Middle Ages that a pelican lived in a tree and laid three eggs; and that after they hatched the pelican quarrels with them and inadvertently kills them, while the mother pelican pecked at her own breast, spilling her blood on them and restoring them to life. This became a potent symbol for Christ feeding his followers spiritually with his body and blood. It was often associated with the Corpus Christi cult during the Middle Ages but not with the Cambridge guild until the granting of the arms in the 16th Century.

The white lilies on a blue background are an ancient symbol of the Virgin Mary. The two symbols therefore incorporate the two constituent guilds of Corpus Christi and the Blessed Virgin Mary.

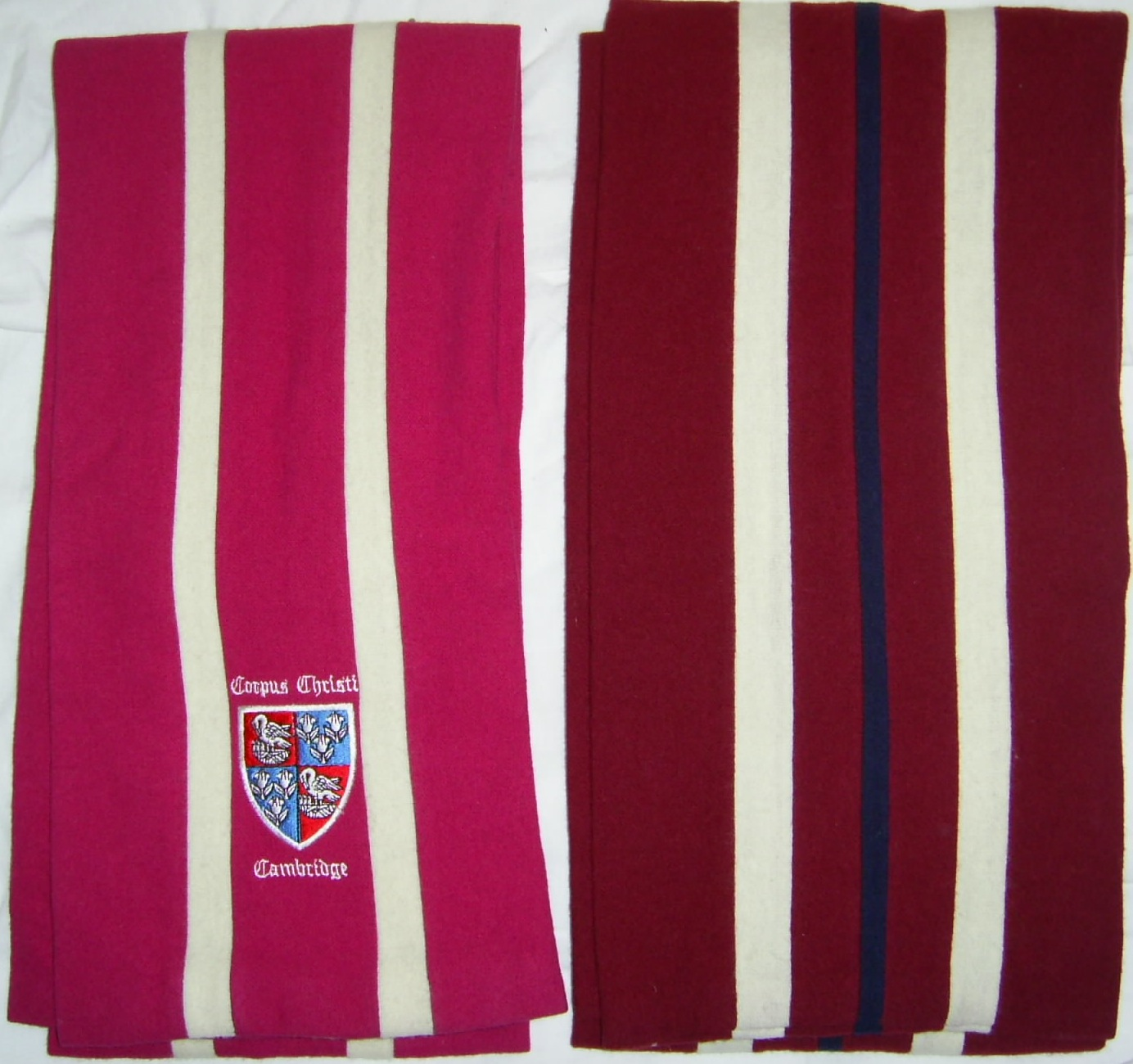
Corpus scarves: on the left is the normal scarf and on the right is the chapel scarf

Although the college officially has no motto, the college toast, Floreat Antiqua Domus (i.e. "May the old house flourish") is often used as such. The nickname 'Old House' has historically been used to refer to the whole college, but most usually to designate the main college buildings, as opposed to outlying places.

The College colours used on scarves, ties, and various sports' kits are two white stripes on a cerise background. The Boat Club use maroon, rather than the cerise shade of pink, for their strips and oar blades. The other sports teams use maroon or sometimes a lighter pink. The Chapel scarf, worn by the choir or chapel wardens, is a dark maroon background with two white stripes on either side of a navy blue stripe running down the middle.

=== Grace ===
Formal dinners are held in the college's hall on Friday, Sunday, and some Wednesdays. Before the meal starts, a gong is sounded and the attendees stand as the fellows and their guests come in from the Old Combination Room to sit at High Table. The following Latin grace is then said:

	Latin	English
Preface on Sundays and Feast Day (before dinner)	Mensae caelestis participes faciat nos Rex gloriae aeternae.	'May the King of eternal glory make us partakers of the heavenly table'
Ante Prandium (before dinner)	Benedic, Domine, nobis et donis tuis, quae de tua largitate sumus sumpturi, et concede ut illis salubriter nutriti, tibi debitum obsequium praestare valeamus, per Christum Dominum nostrum. (response – Amen)	'Bless, O Lord, us and thy gifts, which we are about to take of thy generosity; and grant that we, healthily nourished by them, may be strong to render the thanks due to thee; through Christ our Lord (Response – Amen)'
Post Prandium (after dinner)	Laus Deo per Jesum Christum Dominum nostrum (response – Deo Gratias)	Praise to God through Jesus Christ our Lord (response – Thanks be to God)

Before dinner at Leckhampton, the College's postgraduate campus, a silent grace is held, with diners pausing to collect their thoughts and silently offer their own thanks before sitting. This unique tradition stems from the first dinner at Leckhampton, when new students and fellows, not knowing if the College grace should be said, hesitated awkwardly before sitting for dinner.

=== College ghosts ===
The College is said to be haunted by a number of ghosts among them Henry Butts, hero of the plague of 1630, who hanged himself with his garters in the Master's Lodge on Easter Sunday, 1632. Butts' ghost was subject to an exorcism by three students in 1904.

Another is that of Elizabeth Spencer and her lover (both died in 1667). Elizabeth was the daughter of the then Master, John Spencer and apart from the Master's wife, the only woman in college. One of the students, James Betts, became enamoured and they regularly had tea together. On one such occasion her father interrupted them and she bundled Betts into a wardrobe. The cupboard only opened from the outside and when she came back she discovered he had asphyxiated. Elizabeth, in a fit of grief, committed suicide, throwing herself from the roof of Old Court. Their ghosts are said to walk on Christmas Eve.

The Master in the 1930s, Sir Will Spens, let it be known that anyone complaining of a ghost would be sent down.

== Notable alumni ==
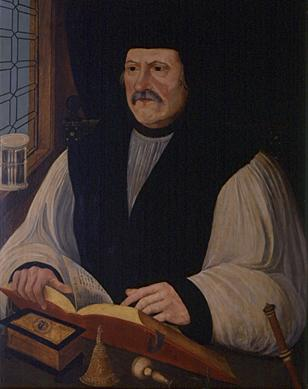
Archbishop Matthew Parker, Master of the College and Archbishop of Canterbury. He was the college's greatest benefactor.

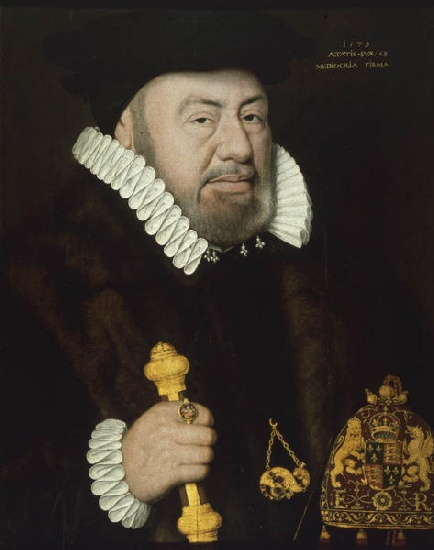
Sir Nicholas Bacon Lord Keeper of the Great Seal in the court of Elizabeth I, attended Corpus Christi College in 1524. The college law society is named after Sir Nicholas Bacon.

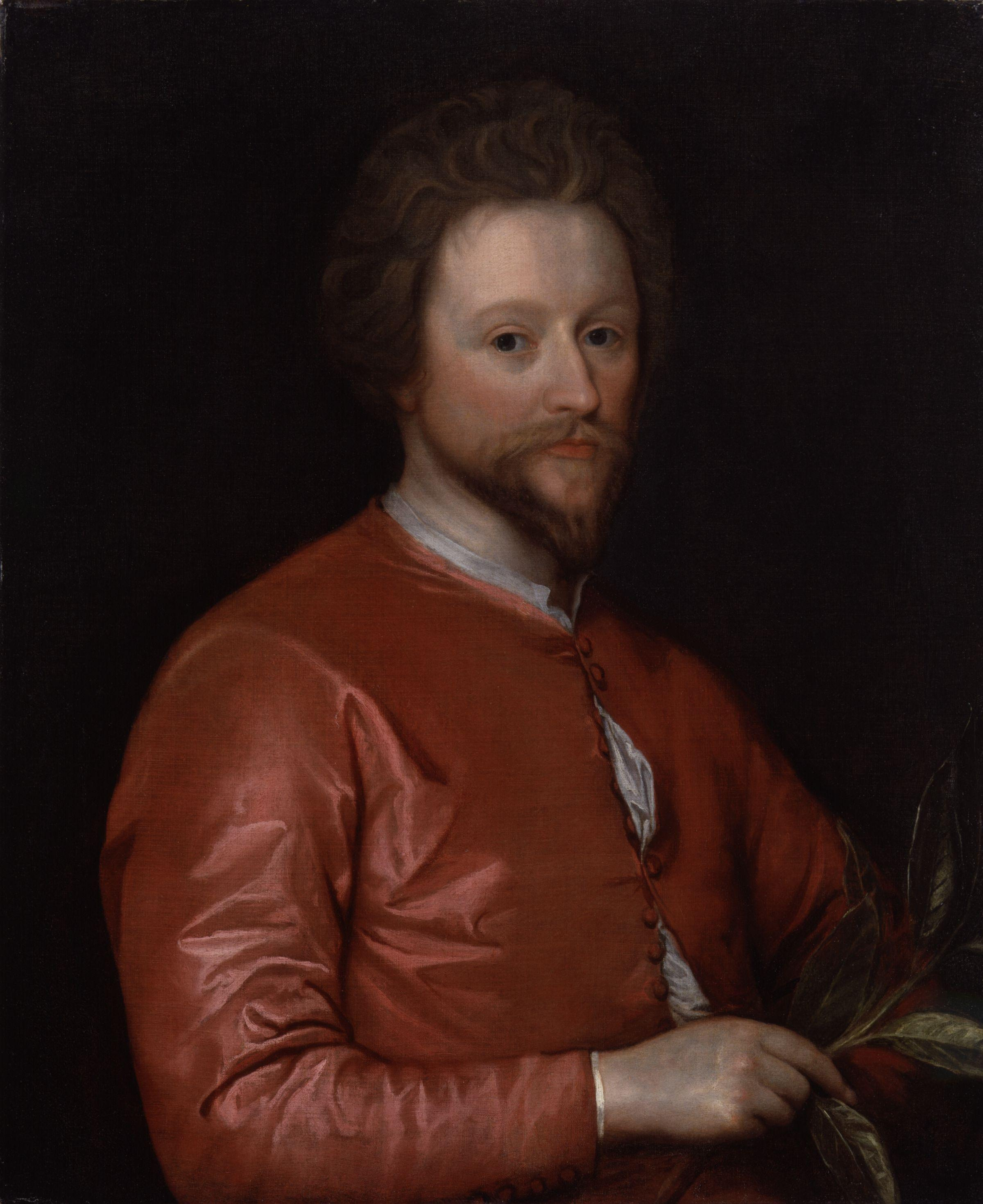
John Fletcher, influential playwright and contemporary of Shakespeare, attended Corpus Christi College in 1591.

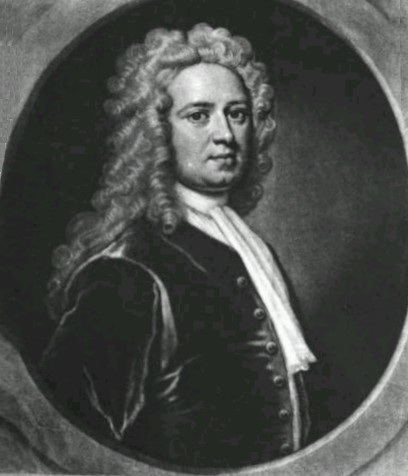
William Stukeley, antiquarian, attended Corpus Christi College in 1708.

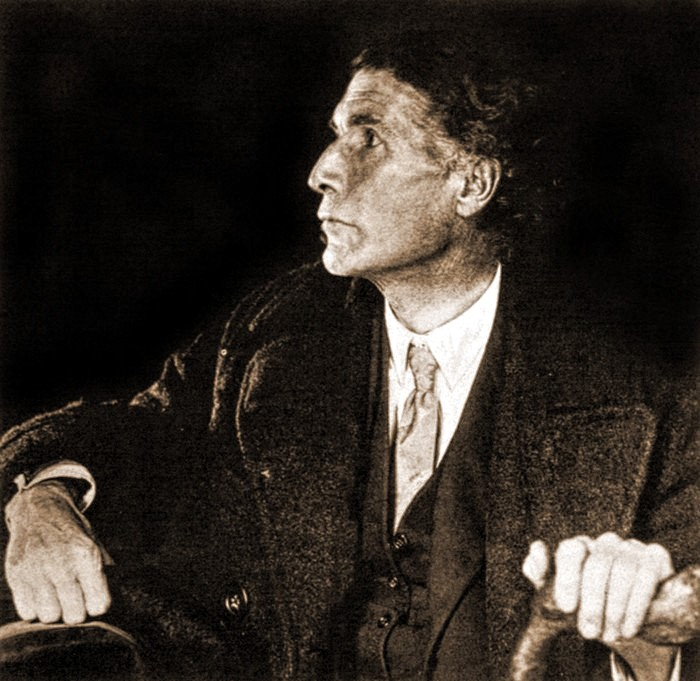
John Cowper Powys, novelist and philosopher, attended Corpus Christi College in 1891.

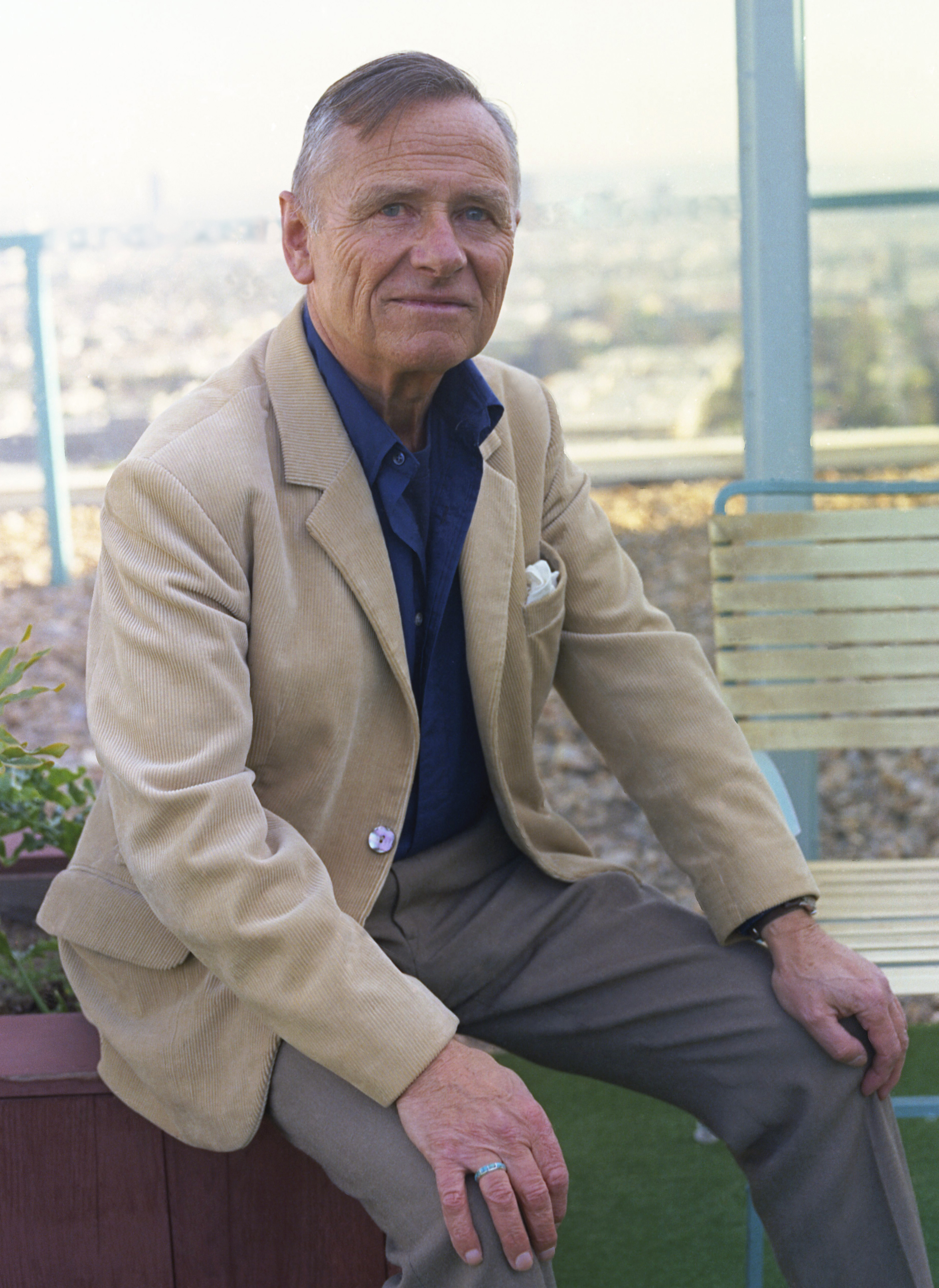
Christopher Isherwood, influential novelist, attended Corpus Christi College in 1925 without completing his degree.

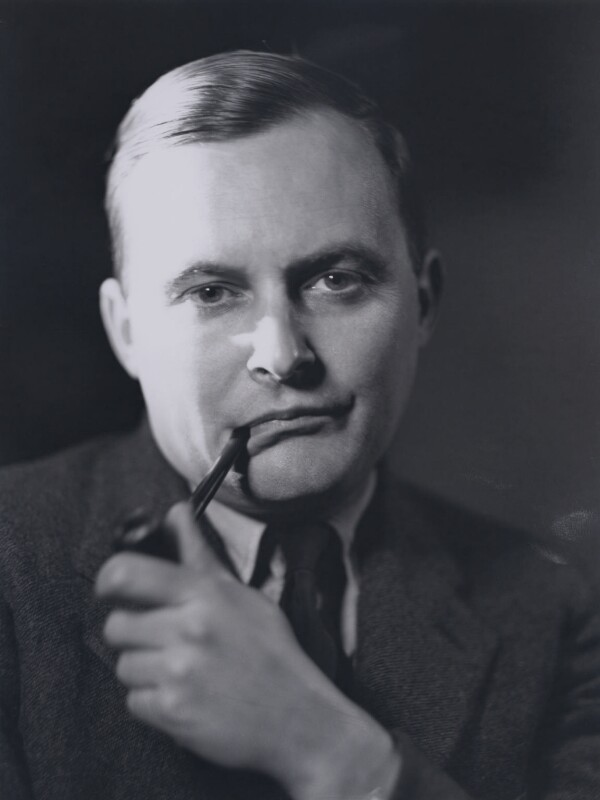
Edward Upward, novelist, Isherwood's friend and mentor, graduated in 1925.

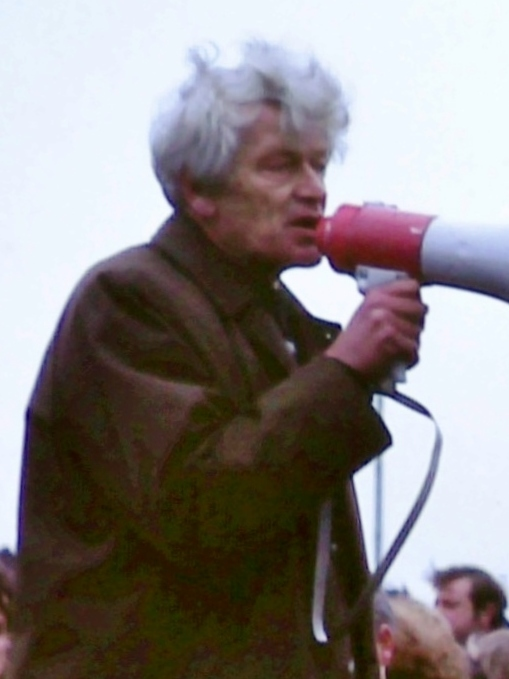
E. P. Thompson, social historian and political activist, graduated from Corpus in 1946.

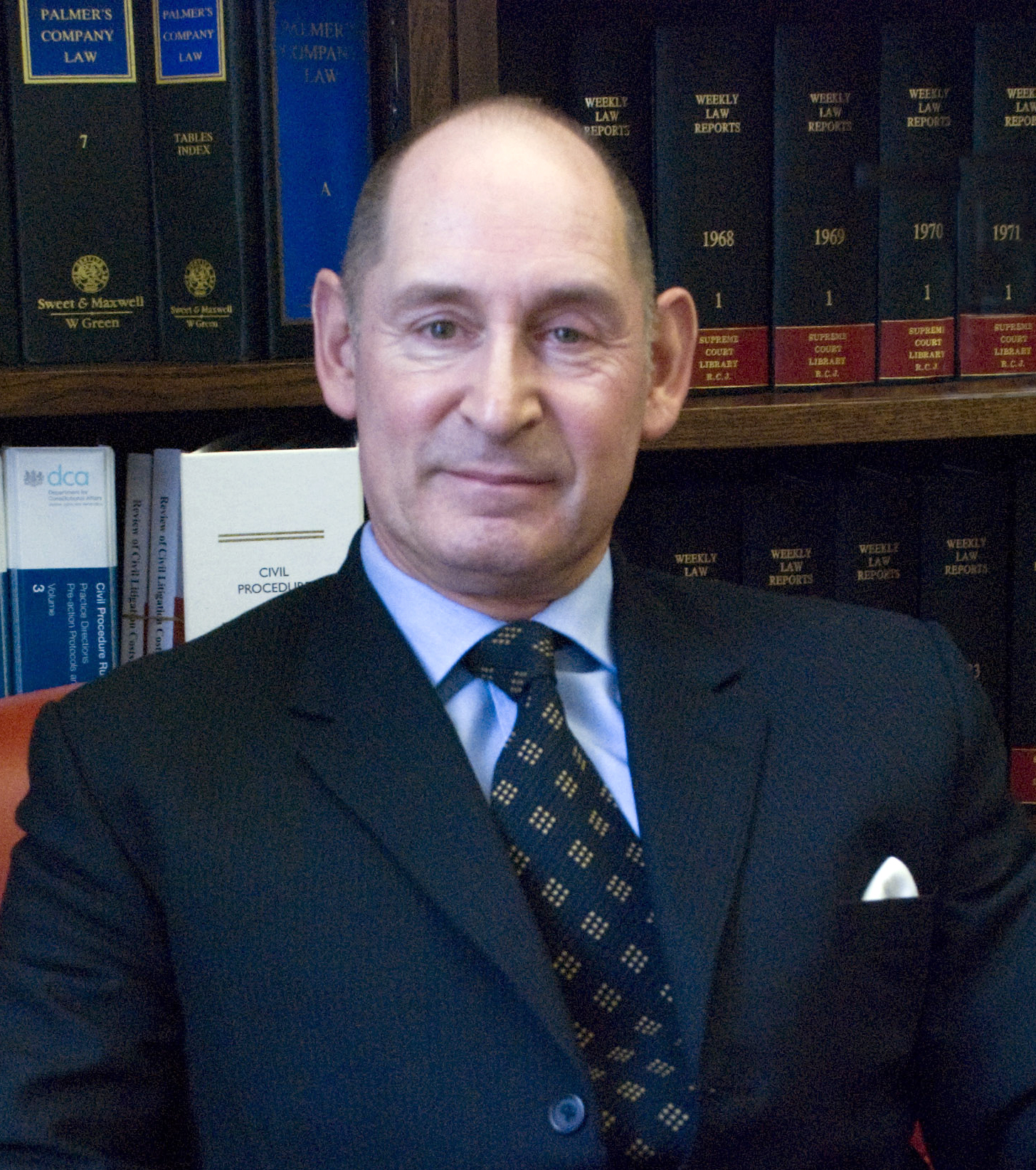
Rt Hon The Lord Etherton, former Master of the Rolls of England and Wales, retired jurist and high-ranking judge, attended Corpus in 1969.

Name	Birth	Death	Career
St Richard Reynolds	c1492	1535	Catholic martyr
Matthew Parker	1504	1575	Archbishop of Canterbury (1559–1575), Master of Corpus (1544–1553), Vice-Chancellor of the University of Cambridge (1545, 1548)
Sir Nicholas Bacon	1509	1579	Politician and Lord Keeper of the Great Seal
George Wishart	1513	1546	Scottish reformer and Protestant martyr
Robert Browne	1540	1630	English Congregationalist and separatist
Francis Kett	1547	1589	Free-thinker; burned for heresy at Norwich
Sir Thomas Cavendish	1555	1592	Navigator
Robert Greene	1558	1592	Author, playwright, and wit
John Greenwood		1593	Puritan and Separatist
Christopher Marlowe	1564	1593	Dramatist, poet, translator
Richard Boyle, 1st Earl of Cork	1566	1643	English Courtier and Lord Treasurer of Ireland
Benjamin Carier	1566	1614	Chaplain to King James I, Fellow of Chelsea College and convert to Catholicism
John Robinson	1575	1625	English Dissenter and pastor to the Pilgrim Fathers
John Fletcher	1579	1625	Playwright
Sir John Wildman	1621	1693	English soldier, Leveller, and politician
Thomas Tenison	1636	1715	Archbishop of Canterbury (1694–1715)
Samuel Wesley	1662	1735	Poet and writer, father of John Wesley and Charles Wesley
Stephen Hales	1677	1761	Physiologist, chemist and inventor
William Stukeley	1687	1765	Antiquarian and biographer of Sir Isaac Newton
Sir John Cust	1718	1770	Speaker of the House of Commons (1761–1770)
Charles Yorke	1722	1770	Lord Chancellor (1770), Attorney General (1762–1763, 1765–1766)
Richard Rigby	1722	1788	Paymaster of the Forces (1768–1784)
Frederick Augustus Hervey, 4th Earl of Bristol	1730	1803	Bishop of Cloyne (1767–1768) and Bishop of Derry (1768–1803)
Richard Gough	1735	1809	Antiquarian
Sir William Ashburnham, 5th Baronet	1739	1823	Member of Parliament (MP) for Hastings (1761–1774)
George Capel-Coninsby	1757	1839	5th Earl of Essex and Lord Lieutenant of Herefordshire (1802–1827), MP for Lostwithiel (1781–1784), Okehampton (1785–1790), Radnor (1794–1799) and Westminster (1779–1780)
William St Julien Arabin	1791	1841	British jurist
Joseph Blakesley	1808	1885	Clergyman and author
John James Stewart Perowne	1823	1904	Theologian
George Evans Moule	1828	1912	English clergyman and first Bishop of Mid-China (1880–1907)
Frederick Barff	1840	1886	Chemist and co-inventor of the Bower-Barff process
Sir Horace Avory	1851	1935	English judge and the prosecution against Oscar Wilde
William Henry Dines	1855	1927	English meteorologist
Sydney Copeman	1862	1947	British medical doctor and civil servant
Albert Harland	1869	1957	Conservative MP for Sheffield Ecclesall (1923–1929)
John Cowper Powys	1872	1963	Writer, lecturer, philosopher
Llewelyn Powys	1884	1939	Writer
Sir Wilfred Marcus Askwith	1890	1962	Bishop of Blackburn (1942–1954) and Bishop of Gloucester (1954–1962)
Captain Henry Macintosh	1892	1918	British athlete, 1912 Olympic gold medal winner and First World War soldier
Captain Sir B. H. Liddell Hart	1895	1970	Military historian
Boris Ord	1897	1961	Composer and Director of Music and Choirmaster at King's College, Cambridge
Edward Upward	1903	2009	Novelist
Christopher Isherwood	1904	1986	Novelist
Sheldon Dick	1906	1950	American publisher, photographer, filmmaker and literary agent
Edward Curzon, 6th Earl Howe	1908	1984	Conservative politician
Sir Desmond Lee	1908	1993	Classical scholar
Robert Hamer	1911	1963	Film director
Dudley Senanayake	1911	1973	Prime Minister of Ceylon (1952–1953, 1960, 1965–1970)
Sir Gordon Wolstenholme	1913	2004	Medical pioneer
Nigel Trench, 7th Baron Ashtown	1916	2010	Ambassador to the Republic of Korea (1969–1971) and to Portugal (1974–1976)
John Chadwick	1920	1998	Classicist and decipherer of Linear B
Robin Coombs	1921	2006	Immunologist
T. E. Utley	1921	1988	English journalist and author
Sir Alan Cook	1922	2004	Professor of Geophysics and President of the Royal Astronomical Society (1977)
Sir Campbell Adamson	1922	2000	Director General of the CBI (1969–1976)
Sir Colin St John Wilson	1922	2007	British architect
Michael Havers, Baron Havers	1923	1992	British barrister and politician, Lord Chancellor
E. P. Thompson	1924	1993	Historian, socialist, peace campaigner
Michael William McCrum	1924	2005	English academic and Headmaster of Eton College (1970–1980)
Alistair Macdonald	1925	1999	Labour MP for Chislehurst (1966–1970)
Sir Rhodes Boyson	1925	2012	Conservative MP for Brent North (1974–1997), Minister of State for Northern Ireland (1984–1986), Minister of State for the Environment (1986–1987)
Eric Sams	1926	2004	Musicologist and Shakespearean scholar
Christopher Hooley	1928	2018	British mathematician
Sir John Michael Gorst	1929	2010	Conservative MP for Hendon North (1970–1997)
The Very Revd Michael Mayne	1929	2006	Dean of Westminster Abbey (1986–1996)
Joe Farman	1930	2013	Geophysicist and discoverer of the ozone hole over Antarctica
David Blow	1931	2004	Chemist and inventor of X-ray crystallography
General the Rt Hon Lord Ramsbotham	1934	2022	Soldier and Her Majesty's Chief Inspector of Prisons (1995–2001)
John Taylor	1936		Inventor, entrepreneur, horologist and philanthropist
General Sir Jeremy Blacker	1939	2005	Master-General of the Ordnance (1991–1995)
Prof Sir Alan Wilson	1939		Scientist, Master of Corpus (2006–2007)
Oliver Rackham	1939	2015	Ecologist, Master of Corpus (2007–2008)
Sir Anthony Bottoms	1939		Wolfson Professor of Criminology at Cambridge (1984–2006)
Michael Steed	1940	2023	Psephologist and Liberal politician
Christopher Andrew	1941		Official historian of MI5
Stewart Sutherland, Baron Sutherland of Houndwood	1941		Academic and Crossbench peer
John Elliot Lewis	1942		Headmaster of Eton College (1994–2002)
Sir Richard Armstrong	1943		British conductor and musician
Prof Sir Colin Blakemore	1944		Neurologist and academic
Simon May	1944		Musician and composer
John Cameron	1944		Musician and composer
Richard Henderson	1945		Nobel Prize-winning biologist
Edward Higginbottom	1946		Musician and former director of music at New College, Oxford
Sir Mark Elder	1947		Current conductor and musical director of the Hallé Orchestra
Neil Hamilton	1947		UKIP Welsh Assembly Member for Mid and West Wales (2016–2021), Deputy Chair of the UK Independence Party (2014–2016), Parliamentary Under-Secretary of State for Corporate Affairs (1992–1994), Conservative MP for Tatton (1983–1997)
Sir David Omand	1947		Former British civil servant and Director of the Government Communications Headquarters (1996–1997)
Karol Sikora	1948		Controversial oncologist and Chief of the World Health Organization cancer programme (1997–1999)
Admiral Sir James Burnell-Nugent	1949		Commander-in-Chief Fleet (2005–2007)
Richard Shephard	1949	2021	Composer
Sir Stephen Lamport	1951		Receiver General of Westminster Abbey, Private Secretary to HRH Prince of Wales (1996–2002)
Lord Etherton	1951	2025	Master of the Rolls of England and Wales (2016–2021), Chancellor of the High Court (2013–2016), Lord Justice of Appeal (2008–2013). Former Olympic fencer (1980).
Kenneth Falconer	1952		Regius Professor of Mathematics, University of St Andrews (2018–)
Lord Hodge	1953		Justice of the Supreme Court of the United Kingdom
Lord Maude of Horsham	1953		Minister of State for Trade and Investment (2015–2016), Minister for the Cabinet Office (2010–2015), Conservative MP for Horsham (1997–), Conservative MP for North Warwickshire (1983–1992), Financial Secretary to the Treasury (1990–1992) and Chairman of the Conservative Party (1999–2001)
Robert McCrum	1953		Writer and editor
Tom Utley	1953		English journalist
Tony Little	1954		Headmaster of Eton College (2002–2015)
Peter Luff	1955		Minister for Defence Equipment, Support and Technology (2010–2012), Conservative MP for Mid Worcestershire (1997–), MP for Worcester (1992–1997)
Sir Jeremy Stuart-Smith	1955		English Lord Justice of Appeal
Owen Paterson	1956		Secretary of State for Environment, Food and Rural Affairs (2012–2014), Secretary of State for Northern Ireland (2010–2012), Conservative MP for North Shropshire (1997–2022)
Kevin McCloud	1959		Designer, presenter of Grand Designs
Bernard Jenkin	1959		Deputy Chairman of the Conservative Party for Candidates (2005–2006), Shadow Secretary of State for the Regions (2003–2005), Shadow Secretary of State for Defence (2001–2003), Conservative MP for Harwich and North Essex (1997–present), MP for Colchester North (1992–1997)
Shah Mehmood Qureshi	1956		Member of the National Assembly of Pakistan (1993–1996; 2002–2007; 2008–2013; 2013–2018; 2018–), Vice-Chairman of Pakistan Tehreek-e-Insaf (2011–), Minister of Foreign Affairs, Government of Pakistan (2008–2011; 2018–), Minister for Planning and Development of Punjab (1988–1990), Minister for Finance of Punjab (1990–1993)
Makhdoom Ali Khan	1954		Barrister, Attorney General of Pakistan (2001–2007)
Simon Heffer	1960		Journalist
Andrew J. Watson	1961		Bishop of Guildford (2014– ), Bishop of Aston (2008–2014)
David Gibbins	1962		Novelist and archaeologist
Marty Natalegawa	1963		Ministry of Foreign Affairs (Indonesia), Government of Indonesia (2009–2014), Permanent Representative of Indonesia to the United Nations (2007–2009)
Hugh Bonneville	1963		English actor
Madeleine Bunting	1964		Author, editor, and journalist
Philip Jeyaretnam	1964		Singaporean lawyer and writer
Murray Gold	1969		English composer for stage, film, and television
David Saint-Jacques	1970		Astronaut, physicist and physician
Ivo Stourton	1982		Author
Yeo Bee Yin	1983		Malaysia Minister of Energy, Science, Technology, Environment and Climate Change (2018-2020)
Helen Oyeyemi	1984		Author
Pierre Novellie	1991		Comedian

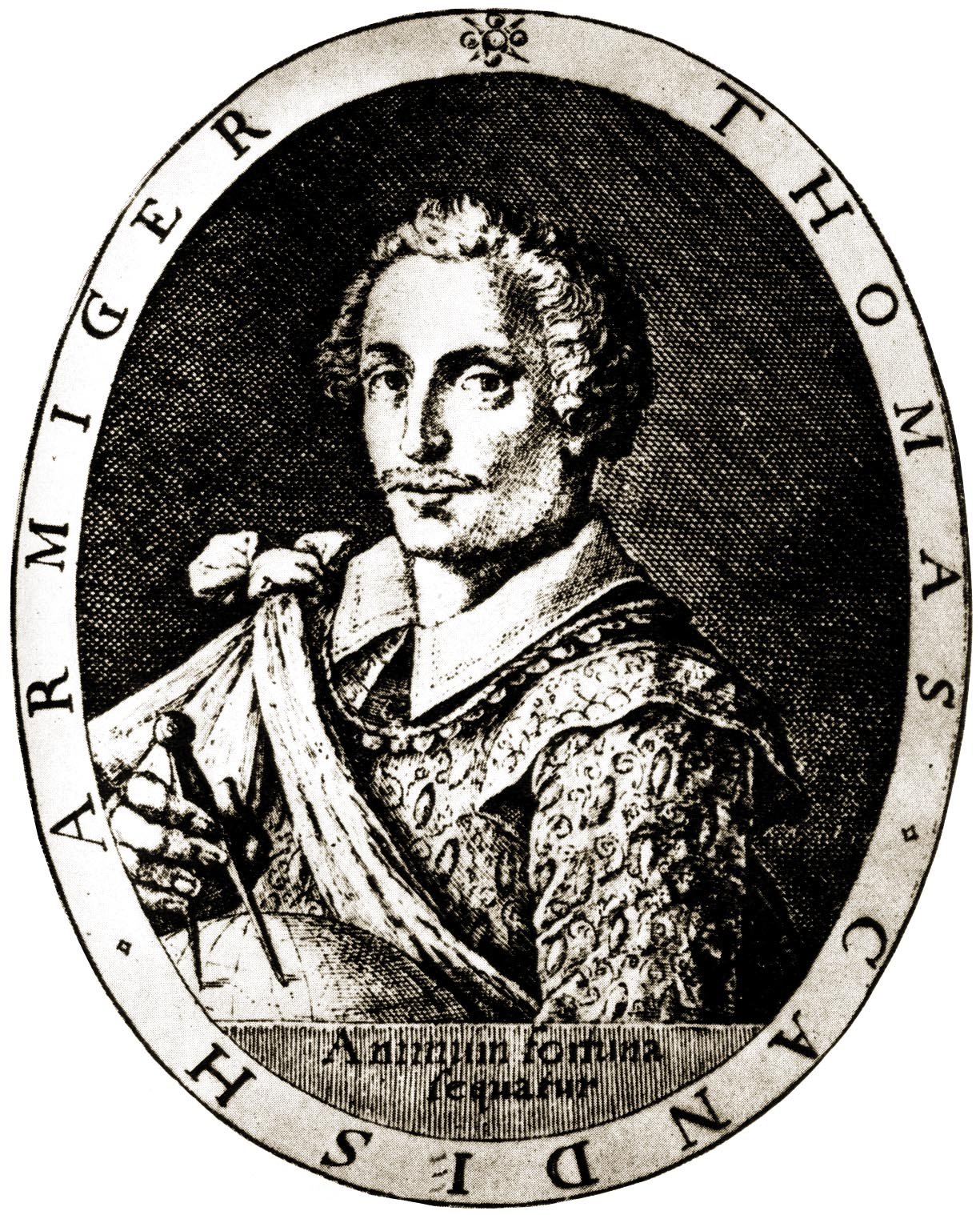
Thomas Cavendish, explorer and privateer, attended Corpus Christi College from 1575 without completing his degree.

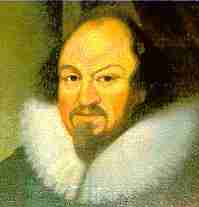
Richard Boyle, 1st Earl of Cork, Great Earl of Cork, Lord Treasurer of the Kingdom of Ireland, attended Corpus Christi College from 1583.

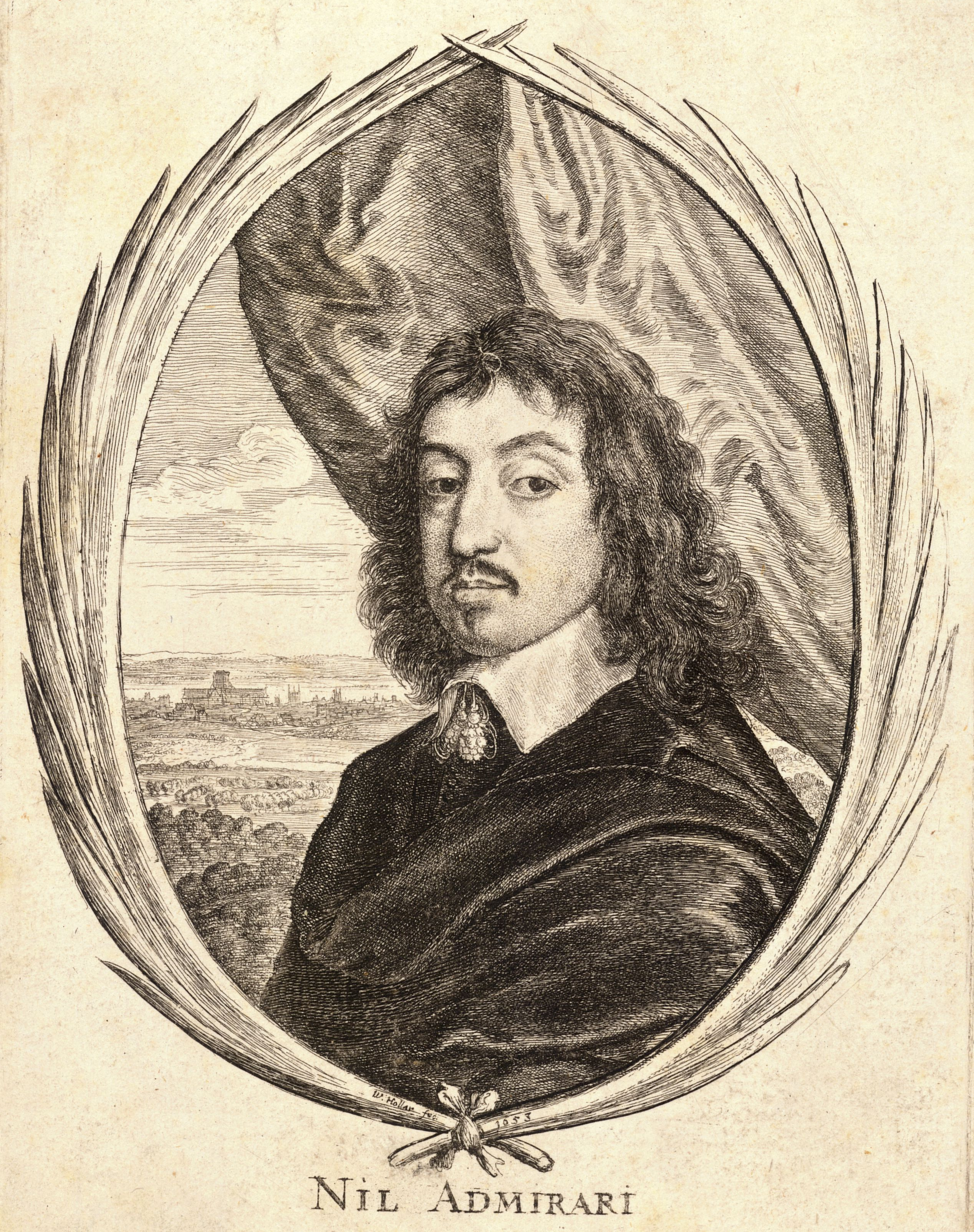
John Wildman, politician and soldier, attended Corpus Christi College from 1639.

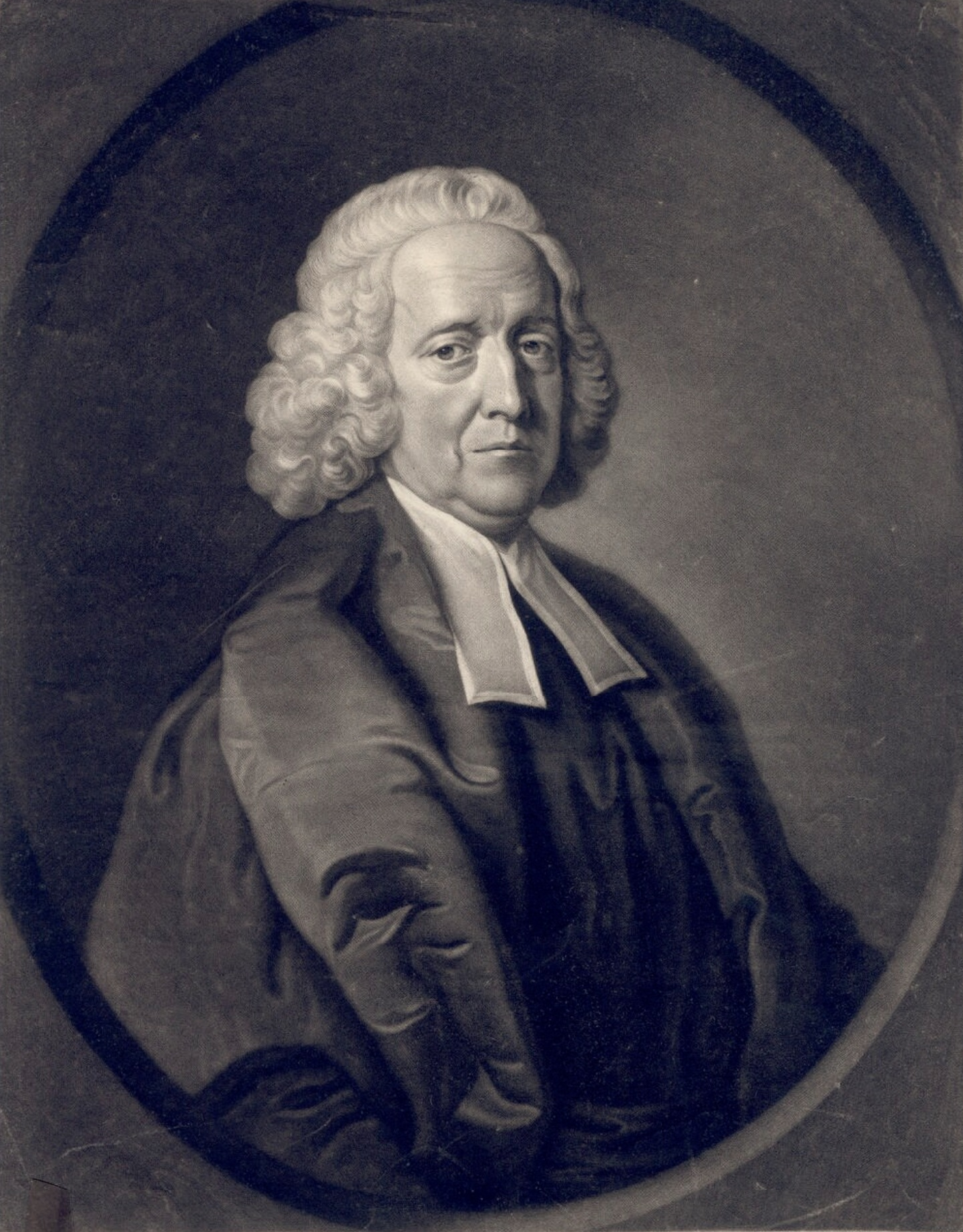
Stephen Hales, plant physiologist, attended Corpus Christi College from 1696.

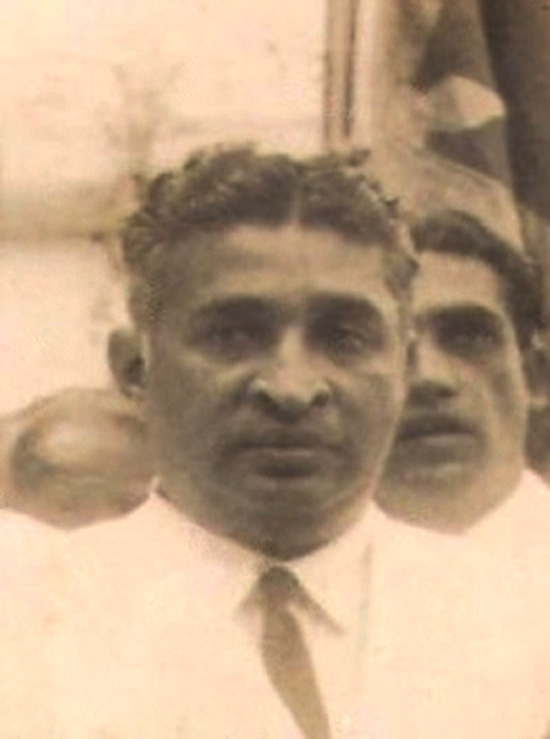
Dudley Senanayake, Prime Minister of Sri Lanka for three terms, attended Corpus Christi College from 1930.

Colin Blakemore, neurobiologist, attended Corpus Christi College from 1962.

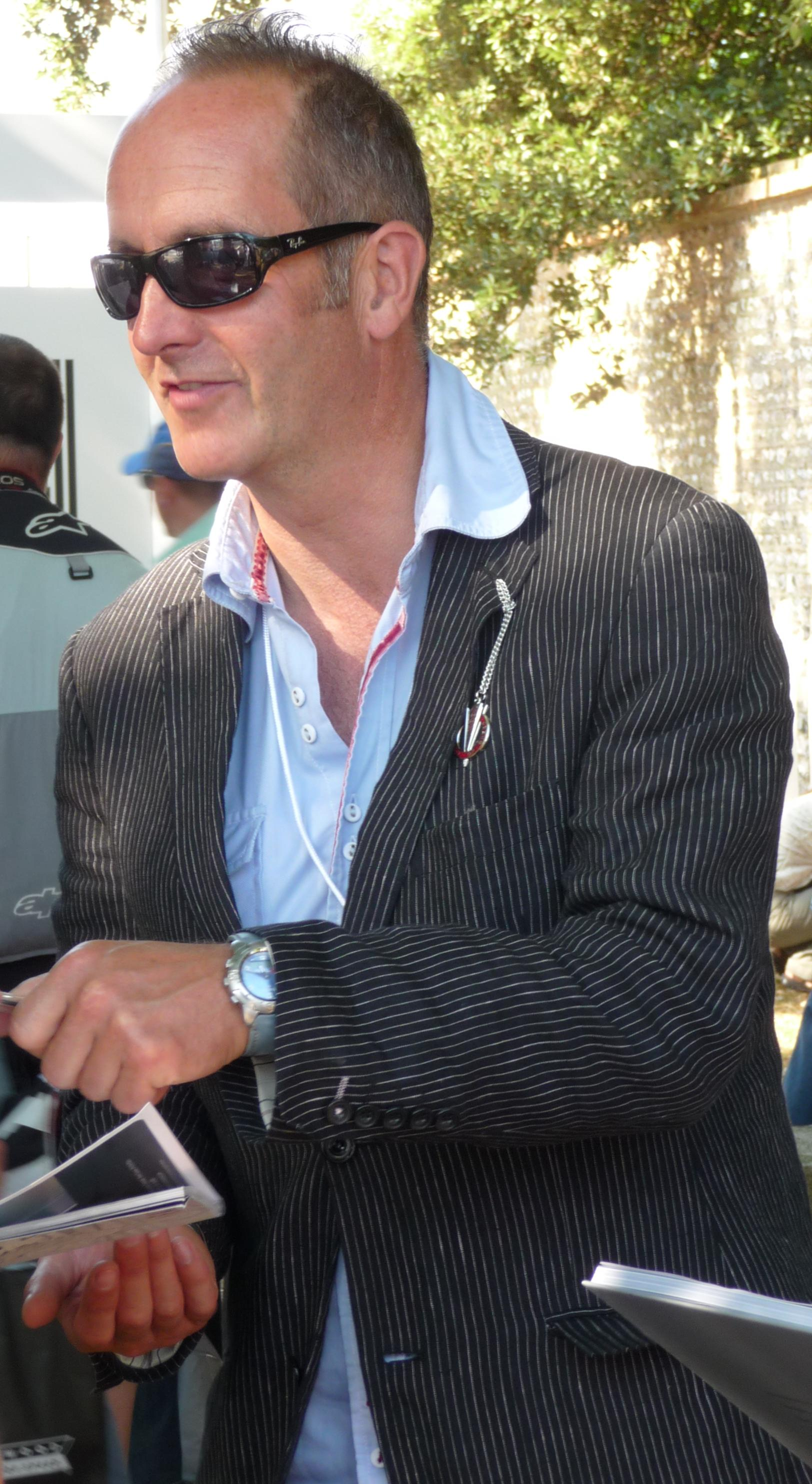
Kevin McCloud, designer and TV presenter, attended Corpus Christi College from 1976.

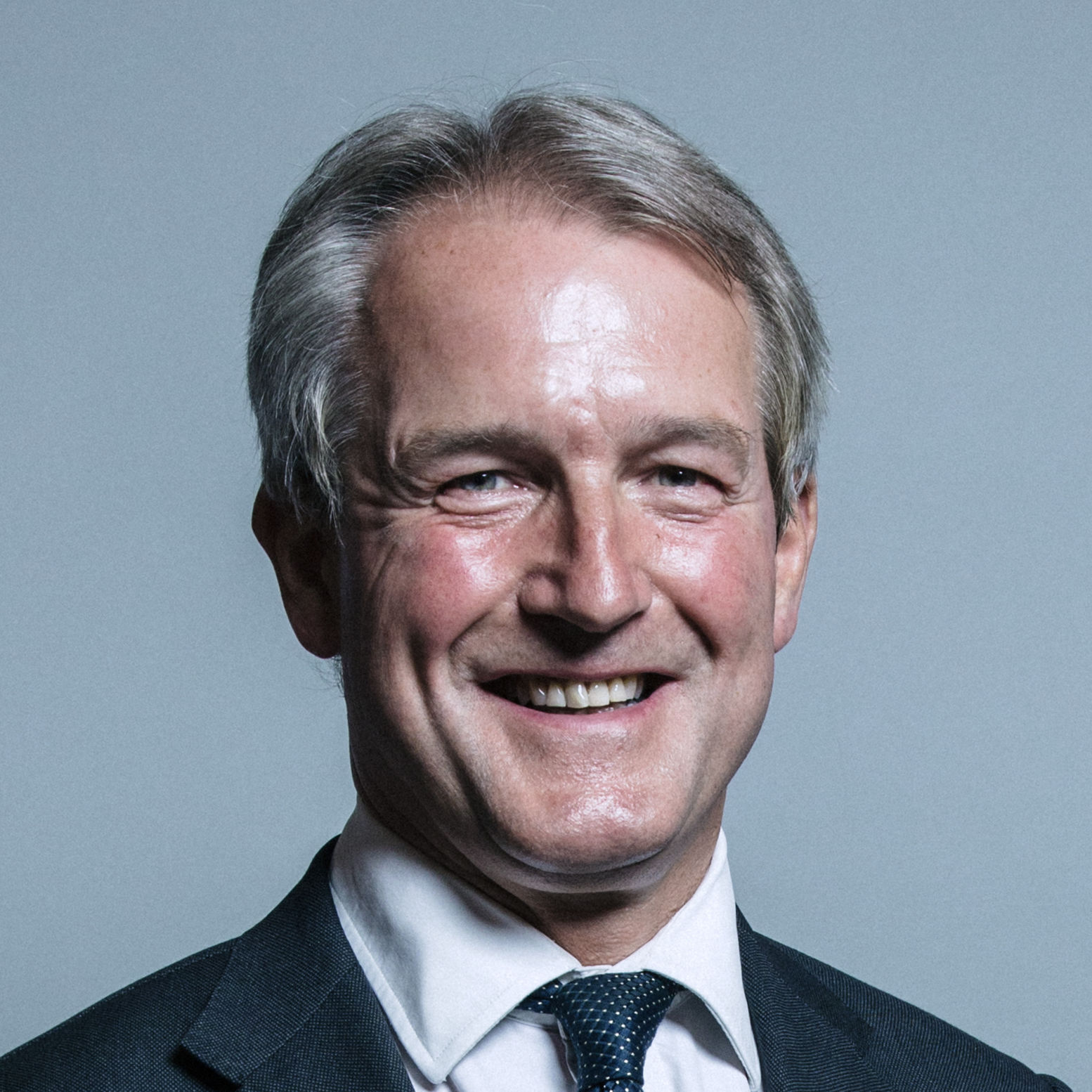
Owen Paterson, MP and former Environment Secretary, attended Corpus Christi College from 1974.

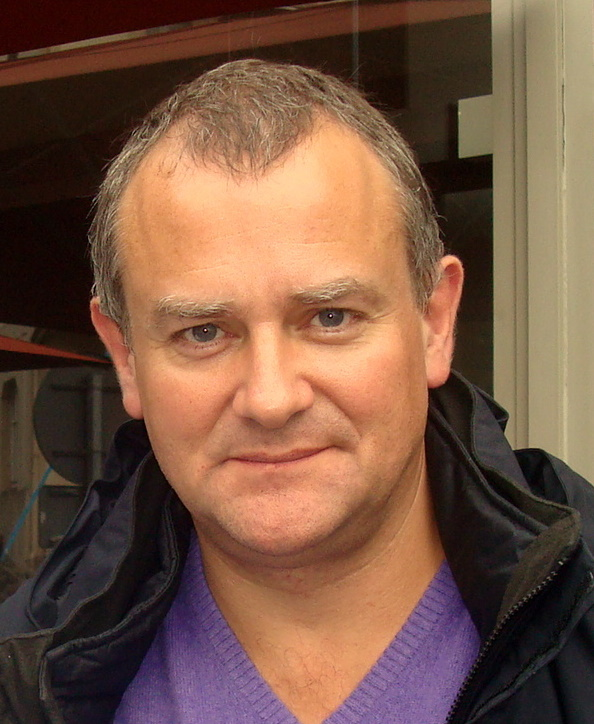
Hugh Bonneville, TV and film actor, attended Corpus Christi College from 1981.

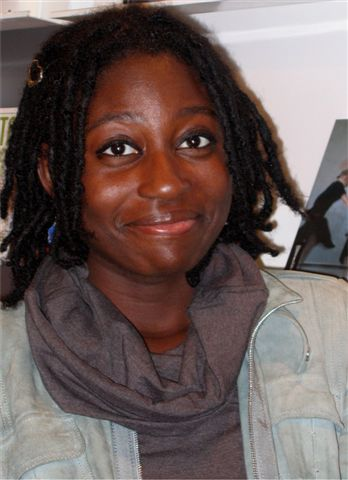
Helen Oyeyemi, author, attended Corpus Christi College from 2003.

== In popular culture ==
- In Porterhouse Blue and Grantchester Grind by Tom Sharpe, the college is mentioned several times throughout the books including a scene where the Senior Tutor wakes after having "dined in Corpus" the night before with such a bad hangover he becomes convinced he is insane. Corpus also appeared in the television adaptation of Porterhouse Blue.
- In Jonathan Strange and Mr Norrell by Susanna Clarke when Lascelles and Drawlight are discussing Jonathan Strange, he is described as the man who "when an undergraduate at Cambridge, frightened a cat belonging to the Master of Corpus Christi".
- In The Black Death: The Intimate Story of a Village in Crisis 1345–1350, which is a fictionalised account of the trials of the village of Walsham during the plague by John Hatcher, himself a fellow of Corpus, the author makes regular reference to the guild of Corpus Christi in Cambridge.
- In Engleby by Sebastian Faulks there are several references to Corpus. At one point Engleby is talking about acquiring opium that he bought "from a boy who got it from a Modern History fellow in Corpus Christi".
- Several of the college buildings briefly appear in the Doctor Who serial Shada with Tom Baker as the Doctor. The show was never broadcast and the episode became the subject of some controversy when it was cancelled by the BBC. It was released on video in 1992.
- In the novel, The Night Climbers, by Ivo Stourton, himself a graduate of the college, Stourton refers to Corpus Christi on several occasions.
- The Parker Library, and more often documents from it, make an appearance in several TV documentaries, particularly in those dealing with the Anglo-Saxons and the Medieval period. Notable amongst these are David Starkey's Monarchy and David Dimbleby's Seven Ages of Britain. Christopher de Hamel, then the Donnelly Fellow Librarian, appeared on the BBC Four series The Beauty of Books.
- The front of the college chapel appears on the cover of Andrew Douglas's book, The King's Codebreaker the first in the Thomas Hill trilogy about an Oxford academic working for the King during the English Civil War in 1643. The use of the college as the cover is unusual given that the college is not in Oxford, neither was the facade of the Chapel built until the 1820s.
- The college features prominently in the second episode of Guilty Pleasures, a two-part documentary presented by Cambridge academic Michael C Scott on the subject of luxury. Several shots included the Wilkins Room of the Parker Library, the front of the Chapel and Old Court. Scott also discusses the foundation of the college, with the help of the Duke of Lancaster, as an example of the nature of luxury changing in the Middle Ages.
- New Court and the Chapel, as viewed from the main gate, feature in the British Government's GREAT Campaign to promote the UK abroad. The College Chapel is pictured under the caption "Knowledge is Great Britain" and above the bottom half of a Union Flag.

== See also ==
- Alumni of Corpus Christi College, Cambridge
- Fellows of Corpus Christi College, Cambridge
- List of Masters of Corpus Christi College, Cambridge
- List of honorary fellows of Corpus Christi College, Cambridge
- Corpus Christi College Boat Club (Cambridge)
- List of Organ Scholars
