= John Spencer (priest) =

English clergyman and scholar

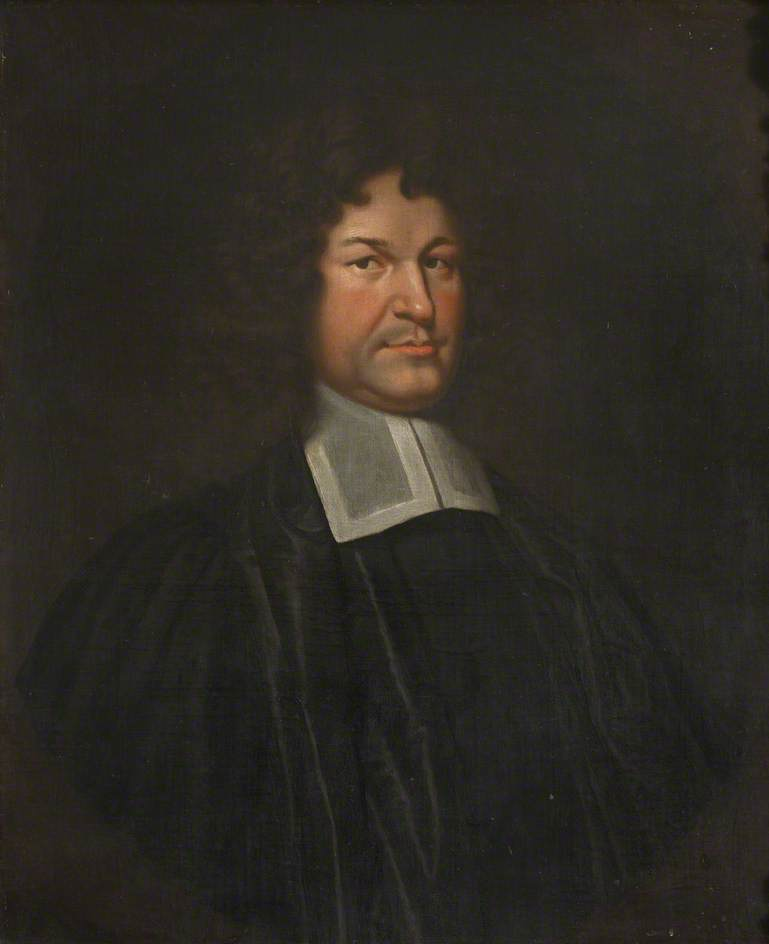
- Born: 1630
- Died: 27 May 1693 (aged 62–63)
- Occupation: Theologian, Hebraist

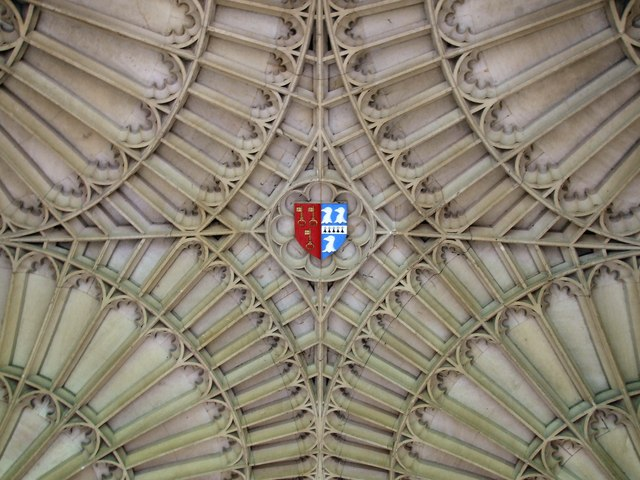
Arms of John Spencer, ceiling, Corpus Christi College, Cambridge: Dean of Ely impaling Spencer (ancient)

John Spencer (1630–1693) was an English clergyman and scholar, and Master of Corpus Christi College, Cambridge. An erudite theologian and Hebraist, he is best remembered as the author of De Legibus Hebraeorum, a pioneer work of comparative religion, in which he advanced the thesis that Judaism was not the earliest of mankind's religions.

== Life ==
He was a native of Bocton, near Blean, Kent, where he was baptised on 31 October 1630. He was educated at the King's School, Canterbury, became king's scholar there, and was admitted to a scholarship of Archbishop Parker's foundation in Corpus Christi College, Cambridge, on 25 March 1645. He graduated B.A. in 1648, M.A. in 1652, B.D. in 1659, and D.D. in 1665. He was chosen a fellow of his college about 1655.

After taking holy orders he became a university preacher, served the cures first of St Giles and then of St Benedict, Cambridge, and on 23 July 1667 was instituted to the rectory of Landbeach, Cambridgeshire, which he resigned in 1683 in favour of his nephew and curate, William Spencer. On 3 August 1667, he was unanimously elected master of Corpus Christi College, a post he held for 26 years.

He was admitted, on the presentation of the king, to the archdeaconry of Sudbury in the church of Norwich on 5 September 1667; and was instituted to the deanery of Ely on 9 September 1677. He died on 27 May 1693, and was buried in the college chapel, where a monument with a Latin inscription was erected to his memory.

== Works ==
=== Urim and Thummim ===
In 1669, he published a Dissertatio de Urin. et Thummin (Cambridge, 8vo), in which he referred these mystic emblems to an Egyptian origin. (See Urim and Thummim.) The tract was republished in the following year, and afterwards, in 1744, by Blasius Ugolinus in Thesaurus Antiquitatum.

=== De Legibus Hebraeorum ===
In 1685, appeared Spencer's major work, his De Legibus Hebraeorum, Ritualibus et earum Rationibus libri tres (Cambridge, 1685; The Hague, 1686). Spencer here conducts a "full-fledged historical investigation" of Mosaic law. According to Jan Assmann, "Spencer's project was to demonstrate the Egyptian origin of the ritual laws of the Hebrews." He acknowledged his debt to Moses Maimonides, his Guide for the Perplexed (circa 1190). While Spencer discovered the influence of Egyptian practices, Maimonides did not. Knowledge of Egypt came from ancient sources. Spencer considered that "the Israelites to whom the Law was given were culturally Egyptians." As history, Spencer's interest was in "reconstructing the 'temporal circumstances' of Moses' laws." Spencer drew on the classical writers of Greece and Rome, the Church Fathers, Josephus, and the Bible. Later, Assmann returned to this subject, discussing Spencer and Maimonides, and that Karl Leonhard Reinhold took Spencer's approach. Spencer concludes that "God gave the Jews a religion that was carnal only in its frontispiece, but divine and wonderful in its interior in order to accommodate his institutions to the taste and usage of the time... ."

Among adverse critics to his De Legibus Hebraeorum were Hermann Witsius in his Aegyptiaca in 1683, Joannes Wigersma, Ibertus Fennema, Andreas Kempfer and Joannes Meyer, John Edwards (1637–1716), and John Woodward. Later writers hostile to Spencer's thesis were William Jones of Nayland, and Archbishop Magee, who rebuked William Warburton for defending Spencer against Witsius.

A second edition of Spencer's work appeared at Cambridge in 1727, (revised by Leonard Chappelow), and another at Tübingen, 1732. Given the religious views at the time, it was indexed in The Bibliographer's Manual of English Literature: K.Q (by William Thomas Lowndes, published by W. Pickering, 1834, see p. 1722) as "a very learned but dangerous work, the great object of which is to show that the Hebrew ritual was almost entirely borrowed from the Egyptians."

Later works on comparative religion, such as Julius Wellhausen's History of Israel (1878) and Cornelis Petrus Tiele's Histoire Comparée des Anciennes Religions de l'Egypte et des Peuples Sémitiques [1882], developed the lines of thought in Spencer.

=== A Discourse concerning Prodigies ===
Spencer also wrote A Discourse concerning Prodigies, wherein the vanity of Presages by them is reprehended, and their true and proper Ends asserted and vindicated, London, 1663; 2nd edit., to which is added a short Treatise concerning Vulgar Prophecies, London, 1665. The former edition was read by Samuel Pepys, who called it "most ingeniously writ, both for matter and style."

== Family ==
He married Hannah, daughter of Isaac Puller of Hertford, and sister of Timothy Puller. She died in 1674, having had one daughter (Elizabeth) and one son (John).

In 1667, while Spencer was Master, his daughter was entertaining a young undergraduate when her father interrupted them. She hid the student in a wardrobe (which college records state only opened from the outside) where he was left for a long time and asphyxiated. Elizabeth, in a fit of grief, committed suicide.

== Notes ==
Academic offices
Preceded by Francis Wilford	Master of Corpus Christi College, Cambridge; 1667–1693	Succeeded by William Stanley
