= William Stanley (priest) =

British priest

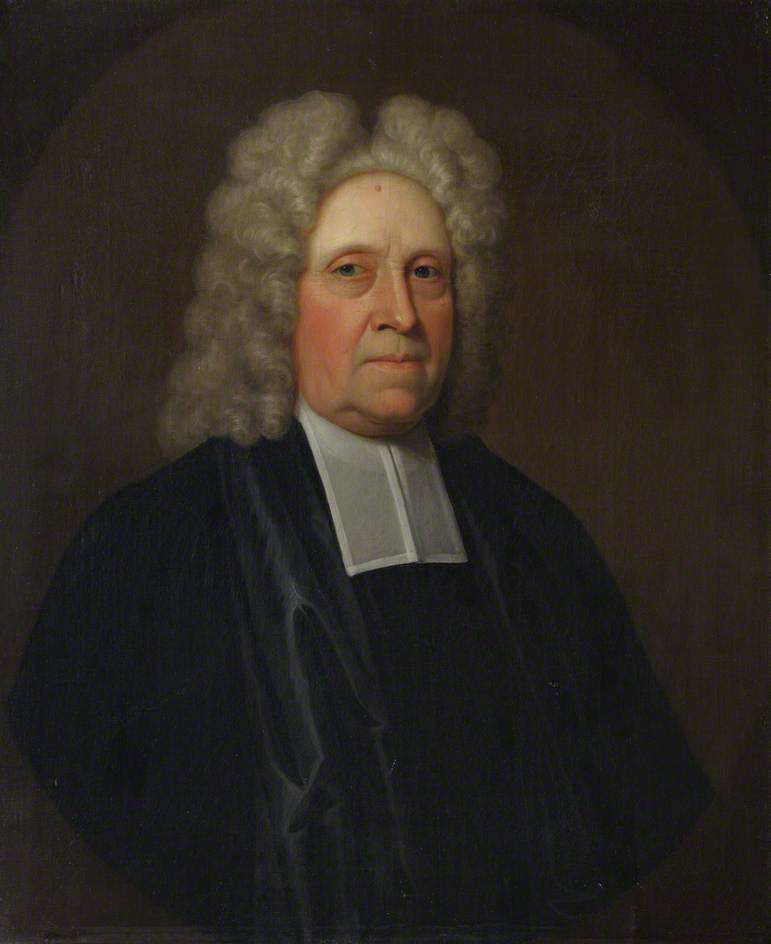
William Stanley by Jean-Baptiste van Loo

William Stanley (1647–1731) was an English churchman and college head, Master of Corpus Christi College, Cambridge, Archdeacon of London and Dean of St Asaph.

== Life ==
He was son of William Stanley, gentleman, of Hinckley, Leicestershire, by his wife Lucy, daughter of William Beveridge, D.D., vicar of Barrow-upon-Soar, and sister to Bishop William Beveridge. He was born at Hinckley in 1647, and baptised there on 22 August the same year. He was educated in a school at Ashley, Lancashire, by Jeremy Crompton, and was on 4 July 1663 admitted a sizar of St. John's College, Cambridge, where he graduated B.A. in 1666. He was elected a fellow of Corpus Christi College in 1669, and commenced M.A. in 1670.

After being ordained priest in 1672, he became a university preacher in 1676, and graduated B.D. in 1678. He became curate of Hadham Magna, Hertfordshire, and chaplain to Arthur Capell, 1st Earl of Essex, who presented him to the rectory of Raine Parva, Essex, on 20 October 1681. This he gave up for the rectory of St. Mary Magdalen, Old Fish Street, London. He was preferred to the prebend of Codington Major in St Paul's Cathedral, 18 September 1684. At this time he was engaged in a scheme for printing an edition of the English Bible, with a plain practical and Protestant commentary, the portion assigned to him being the minor prophets; but the plan was eventually abandoned.

He was appointed chaplain to the Princess of Orange on the dismissal of John Covel in 1685, and before he proceeded to Holland the archbishop of Canterbury conferred upon him the Lambeth degree of D.D., 12 November 1685. As soon as Mary was seated upon the throne of England, he was advanced to the post of clerk of the closet with a salary of 200l. a year settled upon him for life. In 1689 he became canon residentiary of St. Paul's; on 13 August 1690 he was collated by Bishop Henry Compton to the rectory of Hadham Magna; and on 5 March 1692 he was appointed archdeacon of London. The natural tone of his voice was so loud that when taking part in the cathedral services he was heard above all the other singers. A humorous account was given of him by Richard Steele in The Tatler, under the name and character of Stentor. He was elected a Fellow of the Royal Society in 1689

He was unanimously chosen master of Corpus Christi College, Cambridge, 13 July 1693, in succession to John Spencer, and served the office of vice-chancellor of the university in the same year. On 18 January 1694 he was created D.D. at Cambridge. He resigned the mastership in 1698, and he accepted the deanery of St. Asaph on 7 December 1706, at the request of Bishop Beveridge. He defrayed the whole cost an Act of Parliament (it annexed prebends and sinecures to the four Welsh sees in order to relieve the widows and children of the Welsh clergy from the distress of paying mortuaries to the bishops upon the death of every incumbent). He died on 9 October 1731, and was buried in St. Paul's Cathedral.

== Works ==
Besides some occasional sermons, Stanley published:

- 'A Discourse concerning the Devotions of the Church of Rome, especially as compared with those of the Church of England' (anon.), London, 1685; reprinted in Edmund Gibson's Preservative against Popery (1738), vol. ii., and in Edward Cardwell's Enchiridion Theologicum (1837), vol. iii.
- 'The Faith and Practice of a Church of England Man,' (anon.), London (3 editions), 1688; 1700; 1702; 1707; Boston, U.S. 1815; 1841; 1848; reprinted in the 'Churchman's Remembrancer' (1807), vol. ii. and in 'Tractarianism no Novelty,' 1854.
- 'Catalogus Librorum Manuscriptorum in Bibliotheca Collegii Corporis Christi in Cantabrigia, quos legavit Matthaeus Parkerus Archiepiscopus Cantuariensis,' London, 1722.

== Family ==
He married Mary, second daughter of Sir Francis Pemberton, and had three sons Thomas, William, and Francis. His widow died on 28 April 1758, aged 85.

Academic offices
Preceded by John Spencer	Master of Corpus Christi College, Cambridge; 1693–1698	Succeeded by Thomas Green
