= Blaisio Ugolino =

Blaisio Ugolino (also known as Blasius or Biagio, surname Ugolini or Ugolinus) (born c. 1700) was an Italian polyhistor. He is best known for a huge collection of treatises on Jewish antiquities.

== Life ==
Ugolino was born in Venice. He is stated to have been a Jewish convert, and was certainly well acquainted with Talmudic literature.

== Works ==
Ugolino is known for the huge collection of treatises on Jewish antiquities, written in Latin, which he brought together in his Thesaurus Antiquitatum Sacrarum (34 vols., Venice, 1744–69). In this work he reprinted most of the seventeenth-century treatises on Jewish antiquities. He also obtained fresh contributors, and translated himself from the Midrashim.

The subjects treated are as follows:

(a) Festivals, i.

(b) General antiquities, ii.-iv.

(c) Geography, v.-vi.

(d) Priests and temple, vii-xiii.

(e) Midrashim, xiv.-xvii.

(f) Talmud, xvii.-xx.

(g) Ritual and synagogue, xxi.

(h) Sects and proselytes, xxii.

(i) Gentile deities, xxiii.

(j) Jewish law, xxiv.-xxvii.

(k) Numismatics, xxviii.

(l) Costume, marriage, and medicine, xxix.-xxx.

(m) Poetry and music, xxxi.-xxxii.

(n) Death and burial, xxxiii.

Biblical, Hebrew, author, and subject indices are contained in vol. xxxiv.

Ugolino himself translated the treatises Menaḥot and Zebaḥim (vol. xix.); Pesaḥim, Sheḳalim, Yoma, Sukkah, Rosh ha-Shanah, Ta'anit, Megillah, Ḥagigah, Beẓah, Mo'ed Ḳaṭan, Ma'aserot, Ma'aser Sheni, Ḥallah, Orlah, and Bikkurim (vols. xvii.-xviii.); Sifra, Sifre, and Tosefta (vols. xvii.-xix.); besides a part of Maimonides' "Yad" and of Abraham Portaleone's "Shilṭe ha-Gibborim".
