= List of masters of Corpus Christi College, Cambridge =

A master of Corpus Christi College, Cambridge is the head of the college. The following is a list of masters of Corpus Christi College, Cambridge:

Name	Portrait	Term of office	
Thomas de Eltisle		1352	1376
Richard Treton		1376	?
John Kynne		?1379	1389
John de Necton		1389	1398
Richard de Billingford		1398	1432
John Tytleshale		1432	1439
John Botwright		1443	1474
Walter Smyth		1474	1477
Simon Grene		1477	1487
Thomas Cosyn		1487	1511
John Edyman		1515	1516
Peter Nobys		1516	1523
William Sowode		1523	1544
Matthew Parker		1544	1553
Lawrence Moptyd		1553	1557
John Porie		1557	1569:
Thomas Aldrich		1569	1573
Robert Norgate		1573	1587
John Copcot		1587	1590
John Jegon		1590	1602
Thomas Jegon		1602	1618
Samuel Walsall		1618	1626
Henry Butts		1626	1632
Richard Love		1632	1661
Peter Gunning		1661	
Francis Wilford		1661	1667
John Spencer		1667	1693
William Stanley		1693	1698
Thomas Green		1698	1716
Samuel Bradford		1716	1724
Matthias Mawson		1724	1744
Edmund Castle		1744	1750
John Green		1750	1764
John Barnardiston		1764	1778
William Colman		1778	1795
Philip Douglas		1795	1822
John Lamb		1822	1850
James Pulling		1850	1879
Edward Perowne		1879	1906
Robert Townley Caldwell		1906	1914
Edmund Pearce		1914	1927
Sir Will Spens		1927	1952
Sir George Paget Thomson		1952	1962
Sir Frank Godbould Lee		1962	1971
Sir Duncan Wilson		1971	1980
Michael McCrum		1980	1994
Sir Tony Wrigley		1994	2000
Haroon Ahmed		2000	2006
Alan Wilson		2006	2007
Oliver Rackham		2007	2008
Stuart Laing		2008	2018
Christopher Kelly		2018	incumbent
