= Humphrey Tyndall =

English churchman

- Dean of Ely
- Church: Church of England
- Diocese: Diocese of Ely
- Installed: 1591
- Term ended: 1614
- Predecessor: John Bell
- Successor: Henry Caesar
- Other post: Archdeacon of Stafford

Personal details
- Born: 1549
- Died: 12 October 1614 (aged 64–65) Ely, England
- Buried: Ely Cathedral
- Denomination: Anglicanism
- Spouse: Jane Russell (m.1593)
- Education: Christ's College, Cambridge

Humphrey Tyndall (also spelt Tindall; 1549–1614) was an English churchman who became the President of Queens' College, Cambridge, Archdeacon of Stafford, Chancellor of Lichfield Cathedral and Dean of Ely.

== Early life and family ==
Humphrey Tyndall descended from the noble, English, Tyndall family. He was the fourth son of Sir Thomas Tyndall of Hockwold, Norfolk and his second wife, Amy Fermor, daughter of Sir Henry Fermor of East Barsham, Norfolk.

Tyndall entered Cambridge University in 1555, matriculating at the age five or six as a pensioner of Gonville Hall. In 1563 he moved to Christ's College and became a scholar under Andrew Willet.

== Clerical life ==
In 1572, Tyndall was ordained by Edmund Scambler, the bishop of Peterborough. Tyndall's clerical career began at Cambridge, and he was licensed as one of the preachers of the university in 1576. In 1577 he became Vicar of Soham in Cambridgeshire in 1577, a position he held until his death. He was also Chaplin to the Earl of Leicester, whom he married to Lettice Knollys privately on 20 September 1578.

In April 1586, he was installed as the Chancellor of Lichfield Cathedral and prebend of Alrewas, and at the same time also to the archdeaconary in Stafford, offices he retained until his death. Between 1588 and 1599 he was Prebend of Southwell in Nottinghamshire.

In December 1591, Tyndall was installed as Dean of Ely and also as Rector of Wentworth in the Isle of Ely. He resigned the rectory in 1610 but remained as dean until his death in 1614.

== Academic life ==
In 1567, Tyndall was elected as a fellow of Pembroke Hall and became junior bursar in 1570 and senior bursar in 1572. He was awarded the degree of Bachelor of Divinity in 1577, and of Doctor of Divinity, the highest of the degrees awarded by the universities of Oxford and Cambridge, in 1582.

In July 1578, David Yale, a fellow from Queens' wrote to Lord Burghley, begging that if Dr Chaderton (the current President of Queens') were made bishop of Chester, the Earl of Leicester might not be allowed to exert his influence over the fellows in favour of Tyndall, whom he considered to be unfit to be president on account of his youth and inexperience. Despite this he was elected President of Queens' College in July 1579 on the recommendation and through the influence of Lord Burghley.

Tyndall served in the office of Vice-Chancellor of the university between 1585 and 1586.

== Personal life ==
Tyndall married Jane Russell in 1593 and had one child who died at an early age. Jane outlived Tyndall and went on to remarry twice.

Tyndall died in Ely on 12 October 1614 aged 65 and left his books to his college. He was buried in Ely Cathedral on the south aisle of the choir. His tomb features a life-size brass effigy with the following inscription:

"In presence, government, good actions, and in birth,
Grave, wise, courageous, noble, was this earth;
The poor, the Church, the College say, here lies,
A friend, a Dean, a Master, true, good, wise."

Academic offices
Preceded by William Chaderton	President of Queens' College, Cambridge; 1579–1614	Succeeded by John Davenant
Preceded by Robert Norgate	Vice-Chancellor of the University of Cambridge; 1585–1586	Succeeded by John Copcot
Church of England titles
Preceded by Thomas Bickley	Archdeacon of Stafford; 1586–1614	Succeeded by John Fulnetby
Preceded by John Bell	Dean of Ely; 1591–1614	Succeeded by Henry Caesar
