= John Lamb =

John Lamb may refer to:

- John Lamb (general) (1735–1800), U.S. Revolutionary War general and Anti-Federalist organizer
- John Lamb (Australian politician) (1790–1862), New South Wales politician
- John Lamb (congressman) (1840–1924), United States Congressman from Virginia
- John Edward Lamb (1852–1914), U.S. Representative from Indiana
- John Lamb (architect) (1859–1949), architect based in Nottingham
- John Lamb (American football) (1873–1955), American football coach for Emporia State University
- John Lamb (rugby union) (1907–1983), rugby union player who represented Australia
- John Lamb (musician) (born 1933), jazz double bassist with the Duke Ellington Orchestra
- John Lamb (right-handed pitcher) (born 1946), American baseball player
- John Lamb (left-handed pitcher) (born 1990), American baseball player
- John Lamb (producer), American film producer and director, animator, artist
- John Lamb (footballer) (1889-1951), English football half back
- John Lamb (priest) (1789–1850), academic and Anglican priest
- John Lamb (cricketer) (1912–1993), English cricketer

== See also ==
- John Lambe (disambiguation)
