= Henry Caesar (priest) =

English priest

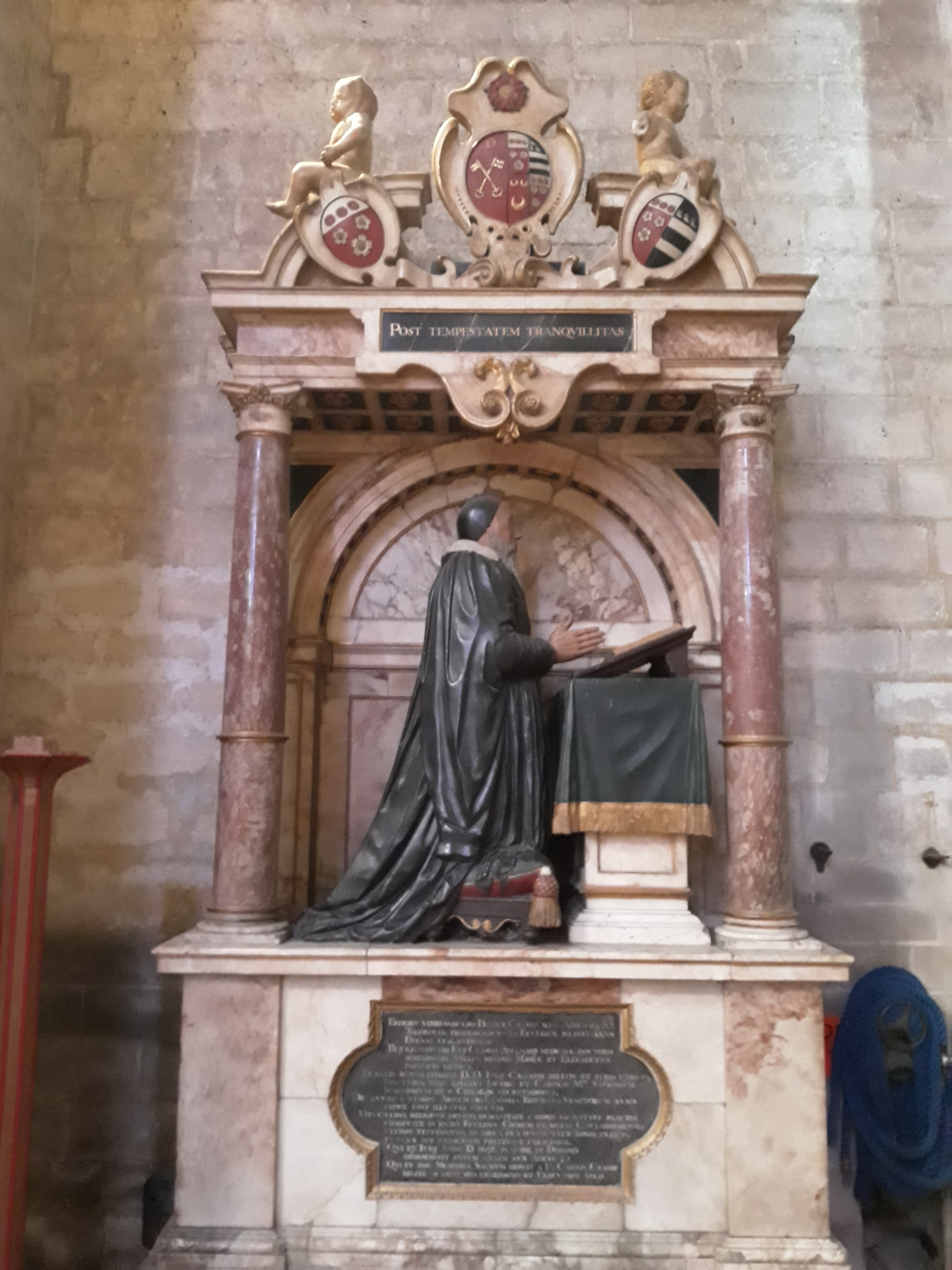
Monument to Henry Caesar in Ely Cathedral

Henry Caesar (1562?–1636), Dean of Ely, fifth and youngest son of Giulio Cesare Adelmare, the Italian physician to Queens Mary and Elizabeth, and brother of Sir Julius Caesar, was born, according to his epitaph, in 1564, although other evidence gives the more probable date of 1562.

== Origins ==
He was also known as Henry Adelmare, being a member of the illustrious 400 year-old Venetian family of Adelmaria of Treviso, as is stated on his monument.

== Life ==
He was educated at Balliol College, Oxford, and afterwards became a member of St. Edmund Hall in the same university. While still very young, he spent some time at Cambridge University, and, being suspected of popish leanings, fled beyond sea. On his return about 1583, he recanted his former errors, and became vicar of Lostwithiel in Cornwall, but in March 1584, Sir Walter Mildmay, whom he had personally affronted, directed proceedings to be taken against him on the ground of his renewed nonconformity. He was still subject to the same suspicion in 1589, when his brother, Sir Julius, entreated Lord Burghley to protect him from his assailants. A few years later, all his enemies were silenced.

On 6 November 1595, he proceeded D.D. at Oxford; on 13 Sept. 1596 was presented by the queen to the rectory of St Christopher le Stocks, in the City of London, which he resigned in July 1597; became rector of Somersham, Huntingdonshire; and was appointed to the second prebendary of Westminster in September 1609, and Dean of Ely in October 1614. He resigned his prebend at Westminster in 1625.

== Death ==
He died, according to his epitaph, on 27 June 1636, and was buried in Ely Cathedral, where an elaborate monument was erected to his memory. The inscription in Latin is as follows:

Post Tempestatem Tranquillitas. Effigies Reverendi viri Henrici Caesaris alias Adelmarii, S. Theologiae Professoris, huius Eccl. 20 plus minus Annis Decani vigilantissimi; Filii illustris viri Julii Caesaris Adelmarii, Medicinae Docttoris, serenissimis Reginis Mariae & Elizabethae principis Medici, Fratris honoratisimi D. D. Julii Caesaris Militis, & juris utriusque Doctoris; binis Regibus Jacobo & Carolo Magistro sacrorum Scriniorum, & 3 Consiliis secretioribus; de antique stirpe Adelmaria Familia Trevesana Venetorum Annis prope 400 illustri oriundi; Vita celebis, Religione devoti, Humanitate candidi, Gravitate placidi, Charitate in huius Eccl. chorum & musas Cantabrigienses ultimo Testamento munifici, praesentis Vitae Bonis felicis, futura, Spe felicioris, Fruitione felicissimi : Qui 27 Junii, Anno Domini 1636, placide in Dom, obdormivit, Annum AEtatis suae agens 72. Qui & hoc memoriae sacrum meruit a Carolo Casare Agnato suo charisimo & Executore solo.

On the Pavement underneath is this on his Grave-stone: Hic jacet Henricus Cæsar, sacrae Theologiae Professor, quintus huius Ecclesiae Decanus, de stirpe illustri Adelmariorum familiae nobilis Trevesana Venetorum in Italia oriundus.

=== Legacy ===
He left several bequests to the officers of the cathedral, and to friends and relations. His sole executor, Sir Charles Caesar, son of his brother Sir Julius, was directed to apply within six months £2,000. to the foundation of two fellowships and four scholarships (open to pupils from Ely school) in some college of his own choosing. Sir Charles chose Jesus College, Cambridge, which received annuities from the family until 1668, but never obtained the capital.

Church of England titles
Preceded by Humphrey Tyndall	Dean of Ely; 1614–1636	Succeeded by William Fuller
