= Cesare Adelmare =

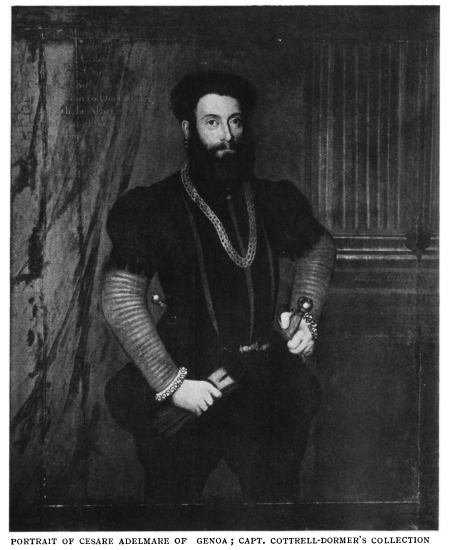
- Known for: physician to Queens Mary I and Elizabeth I

Cesare Adelmare (died 1569) was a physician to Queens Mary I and Elizabeth I of Italian origin. He was also known by various other spellings, his first name often anglicised to Caesar, and his surname given forms such as Dalmariis, Dalmare, and Adelmari.

== Life ==
Cesare Adelmare, having graduated in arts and medicine at the University of Padua, migrated to England, apparently about 1550, and began practice in London as a physician. On 20 April 1554 "Caesar A Dalmariis" was "fined because they were practicing medicine against the law of the realm". A few days later 27 April 1554, he was elected to be a fellow, and in the following year censor, of the College of Physicians.

He was appointed medical adviser to Queen Mary, from whom he obtained letters of naturalisation with immunity from taxation in 1558, and from whom he on one occasion received the enormous fee of £100 for a single attendance. Spanish agents wrote to their government about him from England, suspecting him of being an agent of the Pope, or the Duke of Urbino, and perhaps even of poisoning Mary. In 1566 he was arrested as a partisan of Margaret Douglas, Countess of Lennox. Elizabeth also consulted him and rewarded his services by sundry leases of church lands at rents somewhat below their actual value. In 1561 he fixed his residence in Bishopsgate, having purchased a house which had formed part of the dissolved Priory of St. Helen's. There he died in 1569 and was buried at the church of Great St. Helens.

== Family ==
His father was Pietro Maria Adelmare, a citizen of Treviso, near Venice. This Pietro Maria Adelmare, was a lawyer, who married Paola, daughter of Giovanni Pietro Cesarini, possibly of the same family as Giuliano Cesarini, cardinal of St. Angelo, and president of the Council of Basle, 1431–8.

His wife was Margaret Perient or Perrin (died c.1583). Margery Perient or Perrin's father was identified in one old visitation as Martin Perient or Perrin, a treasurer in Ireland. The name of Caesar, by which the doctor was usually addressed by Mary and Elizabeth, was adopted by his children as a surname:

- His eldest son, Sir Julius Caesar, (1557/1558 – 18 April 1636) judge and statesman, was born at Tottenham in 1557–8, and baptised in the Church of St. Dunstan's-in-the-East in February of that year, his sponsors being the Lord Treasurer, William Paulett, the Marquis of Winchester; the Earl of Arundel; and Lady Montagu representing Queen Mary.
- His second son Sir Thomas Caesar (1561- 18 July 1610) was a Baron of the Exchequer.
- His son Charles (1561–?) was a soldier.
- His son William was a merchant active in the Mediterranean between 1586 and 1591, when he disappeared after a shipwreck.
- His youngest son Henry Caesar D.D. (1564-27 June 1636) was Dean of Ely.
- His daughter Margaret married Nicholas Wright of Gray's Inn;
- His daughter Anne married Damian Peck of Gray's Inn;
- His daughter Elizabeth married John Hunt, a member of Doctors' Commons.

Shortly after his death his widow married Michael Lok.
