= John Pearson (bishop) =

17th-century English theologian and scholar

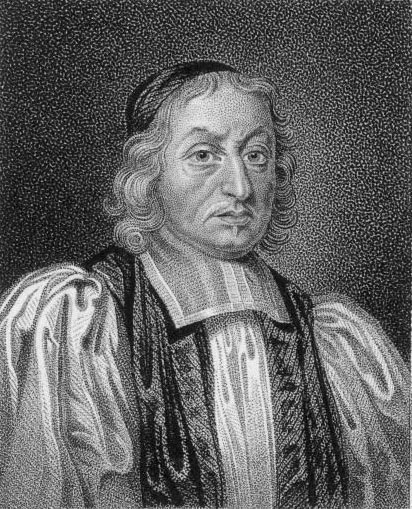
Bishop Pearson

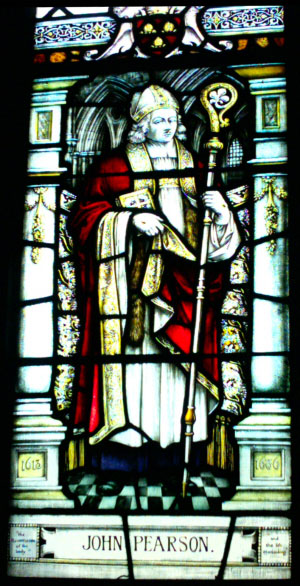
John Pearson in a Chester Cathedral stained glass window

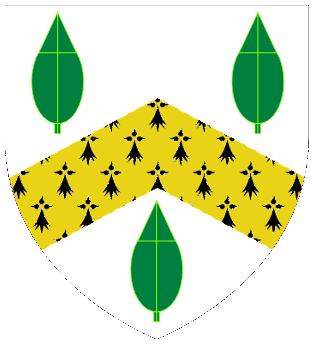
Arms: Argent a chevron Erminois between three leaves Vert.

John Pearson (28 February 1613 – 16 July 1686) was an English theologian and scholar. He served with the Cavaliers in the English Civil War, acting as a chaplain to George Goring's forces.

== Life ==
He was born at Great Snoring, Norfolk.

From Eton College he passed to Queens' College, Cambridge, and was elected a scholar of King's College, Cambridge in April 1632, and a fellow in 1634. On taking orders in 1639 he was collated to the Salisbury prebend of Nether-Avon. In 1640 he was appointed chaplain to the lord-keeper Finch, by whom he was presented to the living of Thorington in Suffolk. In the Civil War he acted as chaplain to George Goring's Cavalier forces in the west. In 1654 he was made weekly preacher at St Clement's, Eastcheap, in London.

With Peter Gunning he disputed against two Roman Catholics, John Spenser and John Lenthall, on the subject of schism, a one-sided account of which was printed in Paris by one of the Roman Catholic disputants, under the title Scisme Unmask't (1658). Pearson also argued against the Puritan party, and was much interested in Brian Walton's polyglot Bible. In 1659 he published in London his celebrated Exposition of the Creed, dedicated to his parishioners of St Clement's, Eastcheap, to whom the substance of the work had been preached several years before. For example, in relation to the Christian cross, he wrote in his commentary on the Apostles' Creed that the Greek word stauros originally signified "a straight standing Stake, Pale, or Palisador", but that, "when other transverse or prominent parts were added in a perfect Cross, it retained still the Original Name", and he declared: "The Form then of the Cross on which our Saviour suffered was not a simple, but a compounded, Figure, according to the Custom of the Romans, by whose Procurator he was condemned to die. In which there was not only a straight and erected piece of Wood fixed in the Earth, but also a transverse Beam fastned unto that towards the top thereof".

Soon after the Restoration he was presented by Juxon, Bishop of London, to the rectory of St Christopher-le-Stocks; and in 1660 he was created doctor of divinity at Cambridge, appointed a royal chaplain, prebendary of Ely, archdeacon of Surrey, and Master of Jesus College, Cambridge. In 1661 he was appointed Lady Margaret's Professor of Divinity; and on the first day of the ensuing year he was nominated one of the commissioners for the review of the liturgy in the conference held at the Savoy. There he won the esteem of his opponents and high praise from Richard Baxter. On 14 April 1662 he was made Master of Trinity College, Cambridge. In 1667 he was admitted a fellow of the Royal Society.

Upon the death of John Wilkins in 1672, Pearson was appointed bishop of Chester. He died at Chester on 16 July 1686, and is buried in Chester Cathedral.

== Theology ==
According to Margaret Drabble, Pearson was one of the most erudite theologians of his age. Pearson's Exposition of the Creed, is considered one of the best products of English dogmatic theology.

His soteriological views are discussed among scholars: Nicholas Tyacke have noted that Pearson, maintained the Arminian view of conditional election, in his Lectiones de Deo et Attributis (1660). On the other hand, Jake Griesel and Stephen Hampton have observed that Pearson upheld a Calvinist position on the doctrines of election and grace both in his Exposition (1659) and his Cambridge lectures, and did so explicitly against the Arminians or Remonstrants (contra Remonstrantes, sive eos quos Arminianos vocant).

== Works ==
In 1659 his Golden Remains of John Hales of Eton, with a memoir, was published. Also in 1659 was published his Exposition of the Creed in which the lectures which were given at the church of St Clement, Eastcheap, London, were included. (The notes are a rich mine of patristic learning.) In 1672 he published at Cambridge Vindiciae epistolarum S. Ignatii, in 4to, in answer to Jean Daillé. His defence of the authenticity of the letters of Ignatius has been confirmed by J. B. Lightfoot and other scholars. In 1682 his Annales cyprianici were published at Oxford, with John Fell's edition of Cyprian's works. His last work, the Two Dissertations on the Succession and Times of the First Bishops of Rome, formed with the Annales Paulini the principal part of his Opera posthuma, edited by Henry Dodwell in 1688.

See the memoir in Biographia Britannica, and another by Edward Churton, prefixed to the edition of Pearson's Minor Theological Works (2 vols., Oxford, 1844). Churton also edited almost the whole of the theological writings.

== Notes and references ==
=== Sources ===
- Drabble, Margaret (1985). The Oxford Companion to English Literature (5th ed.). Oxford: Oxford University Press. ISBN 978-0-19-866130-6.
- Griesel, Jake (2019). John Edwards of Cambridge (1637-1716): A Reassessment of his position within the later Stuart Church of England (PhD dissertation). Cambridge: University of Cambridge.
- Hampton, Stephen (2008). Anti-Arminians: The Anglican Reformed Tradition from Charles II to George I. Oxford: Oxford University Press.
- Pollen, John Hungerford (1912). "John Spenser" . Catholic Encyclopedia. Vol. 14.
- Lueker, Erwin Louis (2000). "Arminianism". Christian Cyclopedia. Saint Louis, MO: Concordia publ. House.
- Sanders, Francis (1895). "Pearson, John (1613-1686)" . Dictionary of National Biography. Vol. 44. pp. 168–173.
- Tyacke, Nicholas (2001). Aspects of English Protestantism C. 1530–1700. Manchester: University Press.

Attribution

Academic offices
Preceded by Richard Sterne	Master of Jesus College, Cambridge; 1660–1662	Succeeded by Joseph Beaumont
Preceded by Henry Ferne	Master of Trinity College, Cambridge; 1662–1672	Succeeded by Isaac Barrow
Church of England titles
Preceded by John Wilkins	Bishop of Chester; 1673–1686	Succeeded by Thomas Cartwright
