= Thomas Caesar =

Member of the Parliament of England

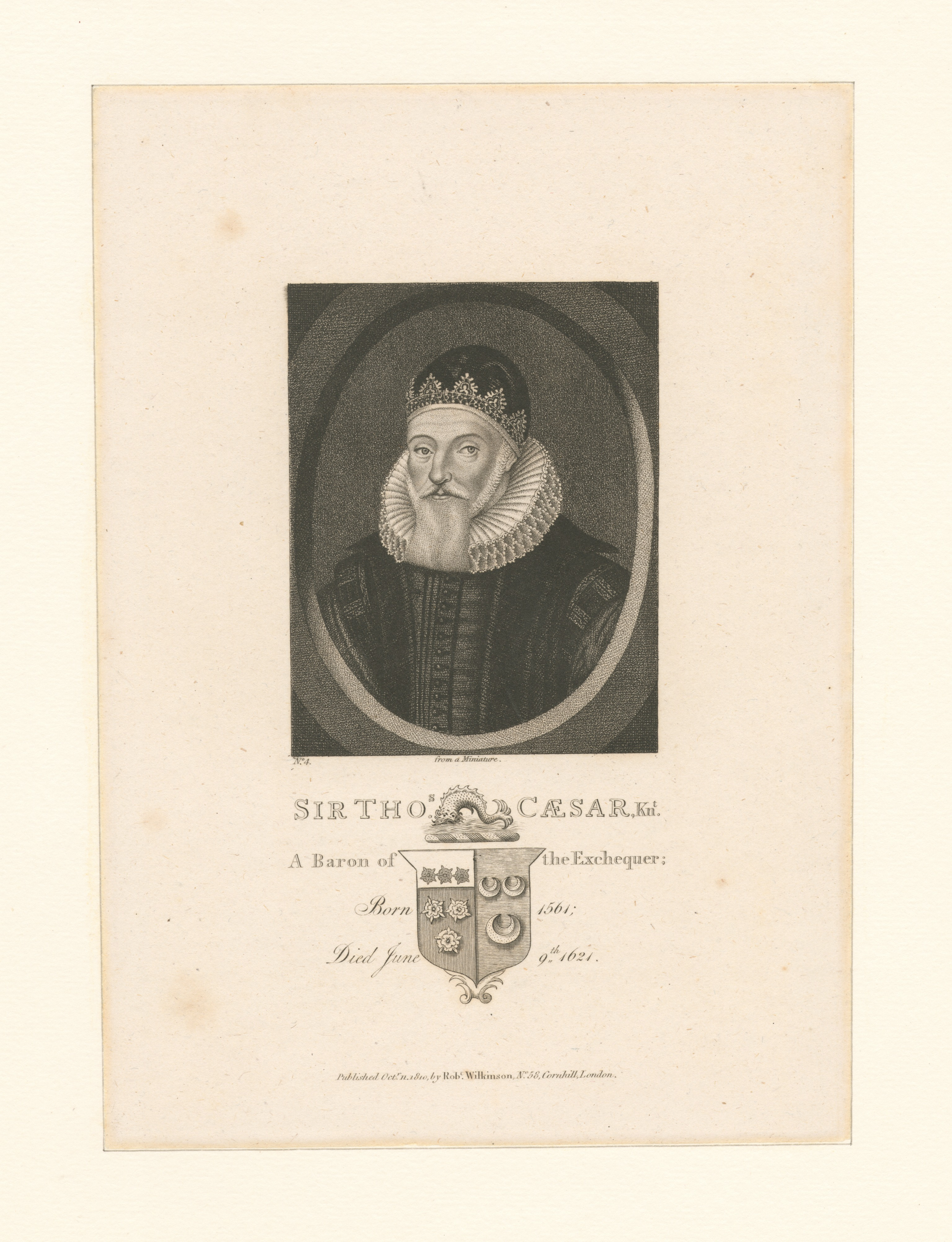
Thomas Caesar

Sir Thomas Caesar (1561–1610), judge, was the second son of Dr. Caesar Adelmare, court physician to Queens Mary and Elizabeth, and brother to Sir Julius Caesar.

== Biography ==
He was born at Great St. Helen's, Bishopsgate, in 1561, and was educated at the Merchant Taylors' School, which he left in 1578. He became a member of the Inner Temple in October 1580. He was elected to parliament from Appleby in 1601.

His career at the bar was wholly undistinguished. Nevertheless, on 26 May 1610, he was created puisne or cursitor Baron of the Exchequer. He was knighted the ensuing month at Whitehall Palace, and from an undated letter of his spiritual adviser, William Crashaw, relating the fact of his death and describing the ‘godly disposition’ in which he met it, endorsed by his brother Sir Julius with the date 18 July 1610, would seem to have died then or shortly before. The vacancy caused by his death was filled in the following October.

He married three times. His first wife died in 1590, leaving three children, who all died in infancy. His second wife was Anne, daughter of George Lynn of Southwick, Northamptonshire, and widow of Nicholas Beeston of Lincolnshire; she died without issue. By his third wife, Susan, daughter of Sir William Ryder, Lord Mayor of London in 1600, whom he married on 18 Jan. 1592/3, he had eight children, three sons and five daughters, who all survived him.
