= Harry Blackburne =

English Anglican bishop

Harry William Blackburne DSO, MC (25 January 1878 – 31 May 1963) was an Anglican clergyman, Dean of Bristol from 1934 to 1951.

He was born on 25 January 1878 and educated at Tonbridge School and Clare College, Cambridge. After service as a trooper in the Queen's Own West Kent Yeomanry during the Second Boer War he was ordained in 1902. After a curacy at All Saints, Leamington he was an army Chaplain from 1903 to 1924. From 1924 to 1931 he was Vicar of St Mary, Ashford. An Honorary Chaplain to the King he was a Canon of St George's, Windsor until his appointment to the Deanery. A noted author, he died on 31 May 1963.

His brother Lionel Blackburne was Dean of Ely, one son Hugh a Bishop of Thetford and another, Kenneth, the first governor-general of Jamaica.

Personal papers belonging to Blackburne are held in the archives at The Museum of Army Chaplaincy.

== Notes ==
Church of England titles
Preceded by Henry de Candole	Deans of Bristol; 1934–1951	Succeeded by Evered Lunt
