= John Lambe (disambiguation) =

John Lambe (c. 1545–1628) was an English astrologer and adviser to George Villiers, 1st Duke of Buckingham.

John Lambe may also refer to:

- Sir John Lambe (Dean of the Arches) (1566?–1647), English cleric
- John Lambe (M5 rapist) (born 1944), English serial rapist between 1975 and 1980
- John Lambe (priest) (1649–1708)

== See also ==
- John Lamb (disambiguation)
