= Mutual and Balanced Force Reductions =

1973–1989 NATO-Warsaw Pact talks in Vienna

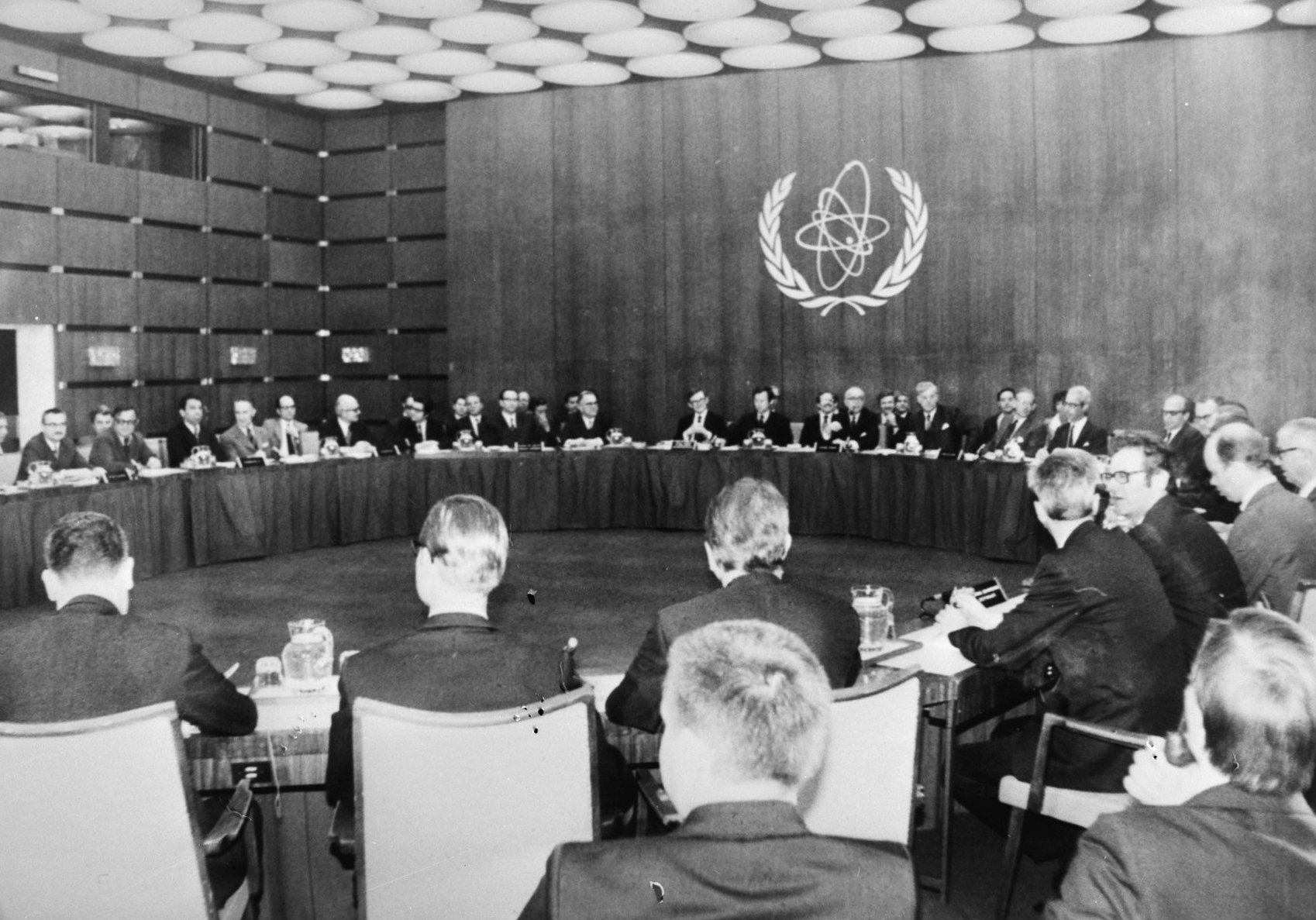
Plenary session of NATO and Warsaw Pact delegates on troop power, Vienna, 16 May 1973

The Mutual and Balanced Force Reductions (MBFR) talks were a series of negotiations aimed at limiting and reducing conventional (non-nuclear) forces in Europe held in Vienna between NATO and Warsaw Pact countries from 1973 to 1989.

== Origins ==
The MBFR talks were first proposed at the SALT meeting between President Richard M. Nixon and General Secretary Leonid Brezhnev. The two leaders agreed that the political side of the talks would be held by the Conference on Security and Cooperation in Europe (CSCE), while talks dealing with the military side would take place at MBFR.

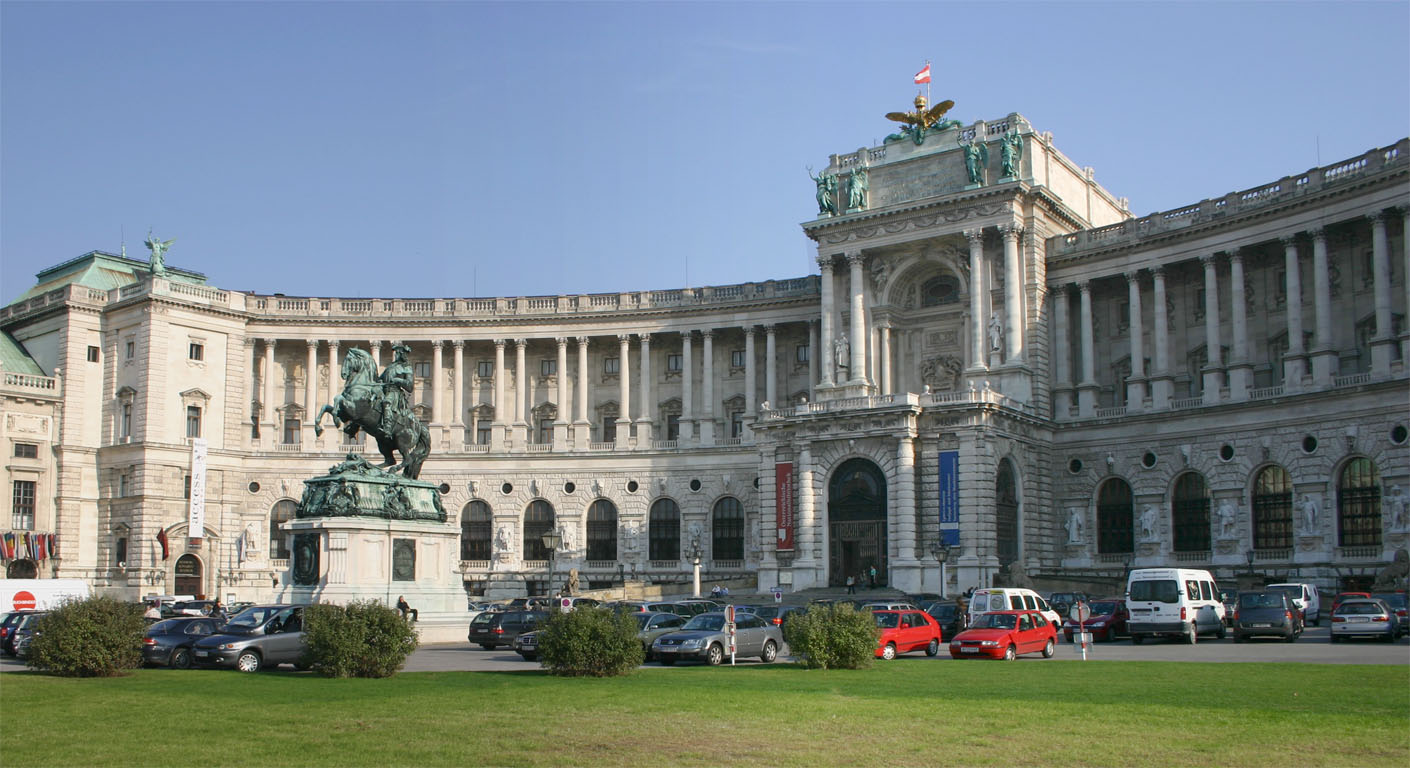
The Hofburg Palace in Vienna, where the talks were held

The preliminary talks started in Vienna in January 1973. At the first meeting, the Russian side rejected the name "MBFR" because the word "balanced" suggested that the Warsaw Pact forces – which had a numerical superiority in Europe – should be reduced more than NATO forces. Their proposed alternative was "Mutual Reductions of Forces and Armaments in Central Europe" (MRFACE), a title that was agreed upon but seldom used.

== Aims ==
The aim of the negotiations was an agreement on disarmament and control of conventional arms and armed forces in the territories of the Federal Republic of Germany, the Netherlands, Belgium, and Luxembourg (from NATO) and East Germany, Czechoslovakia, and Poland (from the Warsaw Pact). Representatives from these nations, as well as the United States, United Kingdom, Canada and the Soviet Union, attended the talks.

== History ==
The first meeting was held on 30 October 1973 in the Hofburg Palace, Vienna. John Thomson, leader of the British delegation, commented:

Our grey little talks are no match for the Congress of Vienna. The Viennese have greeted us in friendly fashion but have probably been disappointed with our lack of glamour and our general 'invisibility'. We have been assigned the Hofburg as the site of our formal meetings whenever they may begin. But we are not destined to use the main salons. We drab bureaucrats are to gather in the room usually reserved for waiting footmen and coachmen in Franz Josef's time. The modern Metternich is not among us. His shadow does indeed fall darkly over us while he flits from Washington to Peking to Tokyo – everywhere but Europe in this 'year of Europe'. Nor do I discern a Talleyrand or a Castlereagh at our amiable 'plenary cocktails'. Instead we have hard-working lawyers and diplomats whose first thought is to engage in drafting and whose second is to avoid publicity.

—

=== 1973 proposals ===
The West put its first proposals on the table on 22 November 1973. This 2-phase plan consisted of the following requirements:

- Phase 1: US to remove 29,000 soldiers; USSR to remove a tank army (5 divisions, 1,700 tanks, and 68,000 troops)
- Phase 2: A limit to be placed on both sides to 700,000 ground forces and 200,000 air forces combined. (This was the NATO position throughout the negotiations.)

The Warsaw Pact's response to NATO's position was that each side should reduce its forces proportionally rather than absolutely and that equipment and troop numbers should be reduced.

- Each side should cut their forces by 20,000
- A subsequent 15 per cent manpower and equipment reduction in manpower by every country in NATO and the Warsaw Pact.

=== 1976 ===
The Warsaw Pact countries submitted a proposal that the USSR and the US should reduce manpower by 2 to 3 per cent and that both the US and the USSR would remove the same number of nuclear warheads, 354 nuclear-capable aircraft, several SCUD-B, and Pershing I launchers, 300 tanks, and a corps headquarters.

In 1976, the different estimates for the number of forces the Warsaw Pact countries were fielding in Eastern Europe became an issue that was never resolved during the talks. (In 1976, the Warsaw Pact gave figures of 815,000 ground force personnel and 182,000 air force personnel, while NATO estimated that the Warsaw Pact had 956,000 and 224,000 personnel, respectively.)

=== 1979 ===
In December 1979, the Soviets held up the talks because NATO decided to site new intermediate-range nuclear missiles in Europe.

=== Talks end ===
The talks ended on 2 February 1989 and were replaced by the Treaty on Conventional Armed Forces in Europe.
