= Jean Daillé =

French Huguenot minister and Biblical commentator (1594–1670)

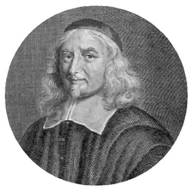
Jean Daillé.

Jean Daillé (French pronunciation: [ʒɑ̃ daje]; (in Latin) Dallaeus; 6 January 1594 – 15 April 1670) was a French Huguenot minister and Biblical commentator. He is mentioned in James Aitken Wylie's History of Protestantism as author of an Apology for the French Reformed Churches.

== Life ==
He was born at Châtellerault and educated at Poitiers and Saumur. From 1612 to 1621 he was tutor to two of the grandsons of Philippe de Mornay, sieur du Plessis Marly. With his pupils he travelled to Italy in 1619, and met Paolo Sarpi in Venice.

Ordained to the ministry in 1623, he was for some time private chaplain to Du Plessis Mornay, at La Forêt-sur-Sèvre, and subsequently worked on the Histoire de la vie de Messire Philippes de Mornay. In 1625 Daillé was appointed minister of the church of Saumur, and in 1626 was chosen by the Paris consistory to be minister of the church of Charenton. On the moderate wing of the Calvinists, he was moderator at the Synod of Loudon. This was the last national synod held in France, which met in 1659. As in his Apologie des Synodes d'Alençon et de Charenton (1655), he defended the hypothetical universalism of Moses Amyraut.

== Works ==
His works include the treatise Du vrai emploi des Pères (1631), translated into English by a Thomas Smith under the title A Treatise concerning the right use of the Fathers (1651). The work attacks those who made the authority of the Church Fathers conclusive on matters of faith and practice. Daillé contends that the text of the Fathers is often corrupt, and even when it is correct, the reasoning is often illogical. He argued that all the Ignatian epistles were spurious, and he was contradicted by John Pearson.

In his massive Sermons on the Philippians and Colossians, Daillé made his claim to rank as a preacher. He wrote also Apologie pour les Eglises Réformes and La foi fondée sur les Saintes Écritures. His life was written by his son Adrien, who retired to Zürich at the revocation of the edict of Nantes.
