= Allan Shaw =

Anglican clergyman

Charles Allan Shaw (16 February 1927 – 16 July 1989) was an Anglican priest in the last third of the 20th century.

He was born in Westhoughton, Lancashire on 16 February 1927, educated at Bolton School and Christ's College, Cambridge and ordained after a period of study at Westcott House, Cambridge in 1951.

After a curacy in Swinton he was Chaplain at Malvern College and then Vicar of St Ambrose, Pendleton, Greater Manchester He was Domestic Chaplain to the Bishop of Birmingham and Succentor of Birmingham Cathedral from 1962 to 1967 when he became Dean of Bulawayo; and from 1969 its Archdeacon. Additionally Vicar general of Matabeleland from 1972, he returned to England three years later to become Precentor of Hereford Cathedral (one of its Residentiary Canons). He was Dean of Ely for a brief period (1982–1984), but had to stand down after what a Daily Telegraph obituary referred to as "the personal problems that might arise if loneliness and frustration were combined." He was then appointed Rector of Alcester by the Marquess of Hertford until his death on 16 July 1989.

He never married.

Church of England titles
Preceded by Michael Sausmarez Carey	Dean of Ely; 1982 – 1984	Succeeded by William James Patterson
