= Richard Love =

English churchman and academic

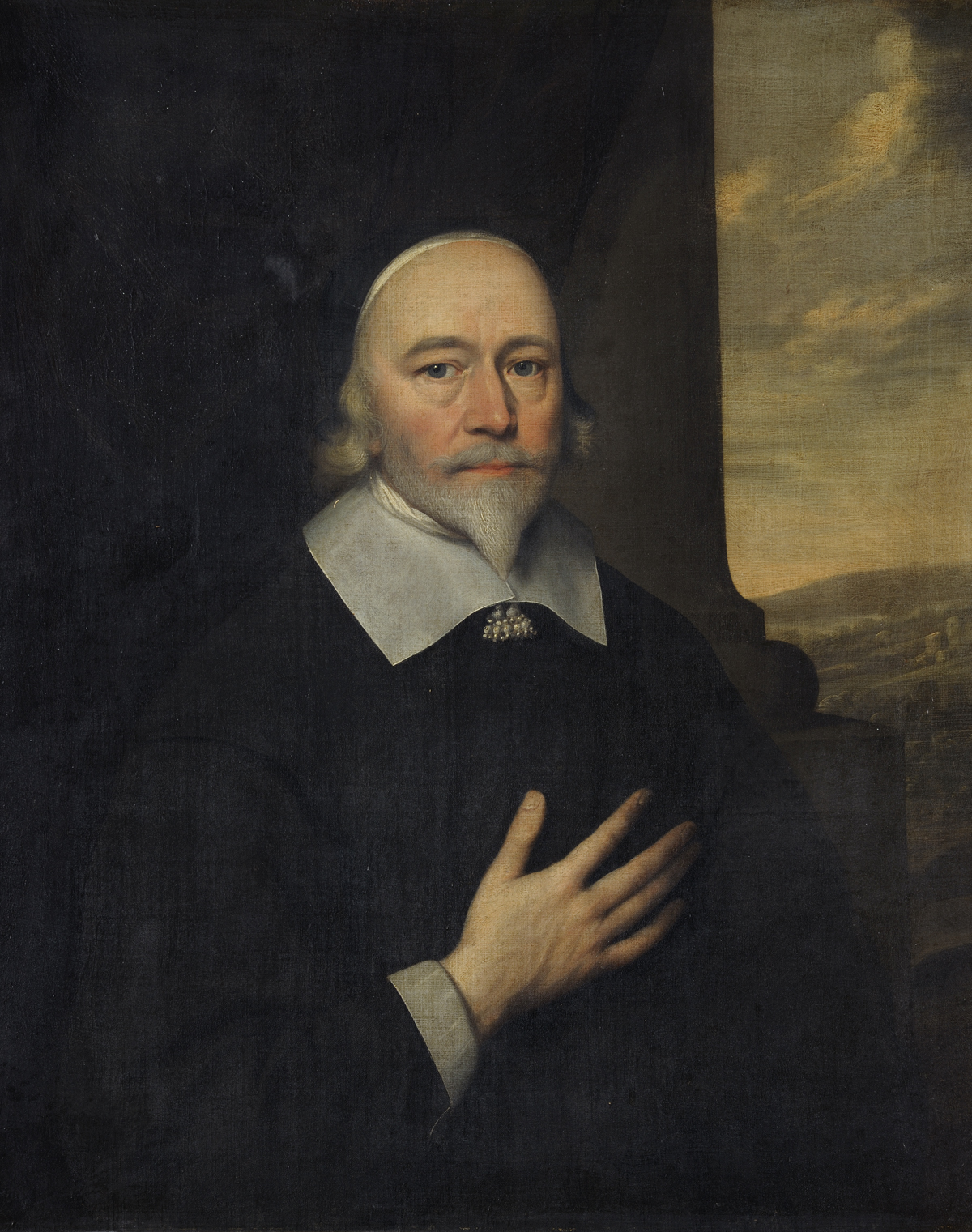
Richard Love, 17th-century painting by the circle of Cornelis Janssens van Ceulen.

Richard Love (1596–1661) was an English churchman and academic, Master of Corpus Christi College, Cambridge, Lady Margaret's Professor of Divinity, member of the Westminster Assembly, and Dean of Ely.

== Life ==
He was son of Richard Love, an apothecary who died in 1605, and was born in the parish of St. Mary the Great, Cambridge, on 26 December 1596. He was probably educated at the free school, Cambridge, subsequently at Clare Hall, where he was a fellow before 1628. In 1628 he was proctor, and about the same time was made chaplain in ordinary to Charles I, who on 27 October 1629 presented him to the living of Eckington, Derbyshire. In January 1631 he proceeded D.D., on the king's recommendation. On 12 October 1631 he received the prebend of Tachbrook in Lichfield Cathedral.

By a mandate from Charles I, Love was made Master of Corpus Christi College on 4 April 1632, immediately on the death of Henry Butts. A quarrel followed between Love and Robert Rich, 2nd Earl of Warwick. Warwick, supported by the king, tried to press a nominee of his own for a vacant fellowship, but the master and fellows resisted and finally the king directed the withdrawal of the candidate, after receiving a letter of apology and explanation from Love. From November 1633 to November 1634 Love was vice-chancellor. His most notable act in that capacity was to cause the arrest of Peter Hausted in the pulpit of St. Mary's while preaching a sermon against the neglect of religious duties in the university.

In July 1643 a general leave of absence was granted to the fellows, but Love was one of four heads of colleges at Cambridge who continued in their posts. Colonel Valentine Walton was Love's friend, and protected him during the supremacy of the parliament. In 1649 he was made Lady Margaret's Professor of Divinity, and appears to have retained his prebend, but in 1650 his hold on his preferments was imperilled by his refusal to subscribe the Engagement; whether he subscribed is not certain. He managed to retain his preferments, and was made a member of the Westminster Assembly of divines, though he apparently took no part in its proceedings.

After the Restoration the king made him dean of Ely by patent dated 14 August; he was installed 28 September. He died at the beginning of February 1661, and was buried in his college chapel.

== Works ==
Love composed two Latin congratulatory addresses on the return of Charles II, which he published in one volume at Cambridge, 1660. In the first, delivered at Cambridge, Love, with much address, expatiates on the calamities of the late rebellion, and adroitly excuses his temporary acquiescence. The second (published by the king's command) was presented by Love in person, acting as deputy vice-chancellor, at Whitehall, 5 June 1660. He also contributed to the Cambridge collection of verses which were published at the Restoration.

Love also published a sermon, preached at Whitehall to parliament at the monthly fast, 30 March 1642, entitled The Watchman's Watchword, 1643, Cambridge.

== Family ==
He married about 1632 Grace, daughter of his stepfather Henry Moutlow, Gresham Professor of Law and public orator, and had four sons, the eldest of whom was at Clare Hall in 1662, and two daughters. The elder, Anne, married Thomas Tenison.

== Notes ==
Academic offices
Preceded by Henry Butts	Master of Corpus Christi College, Cambridge; 1632–1661	Succeeded by Peter Gunning
