= Mariot Leslie =

British diplomat

Dame Mariot Leslie DCMG FRSE
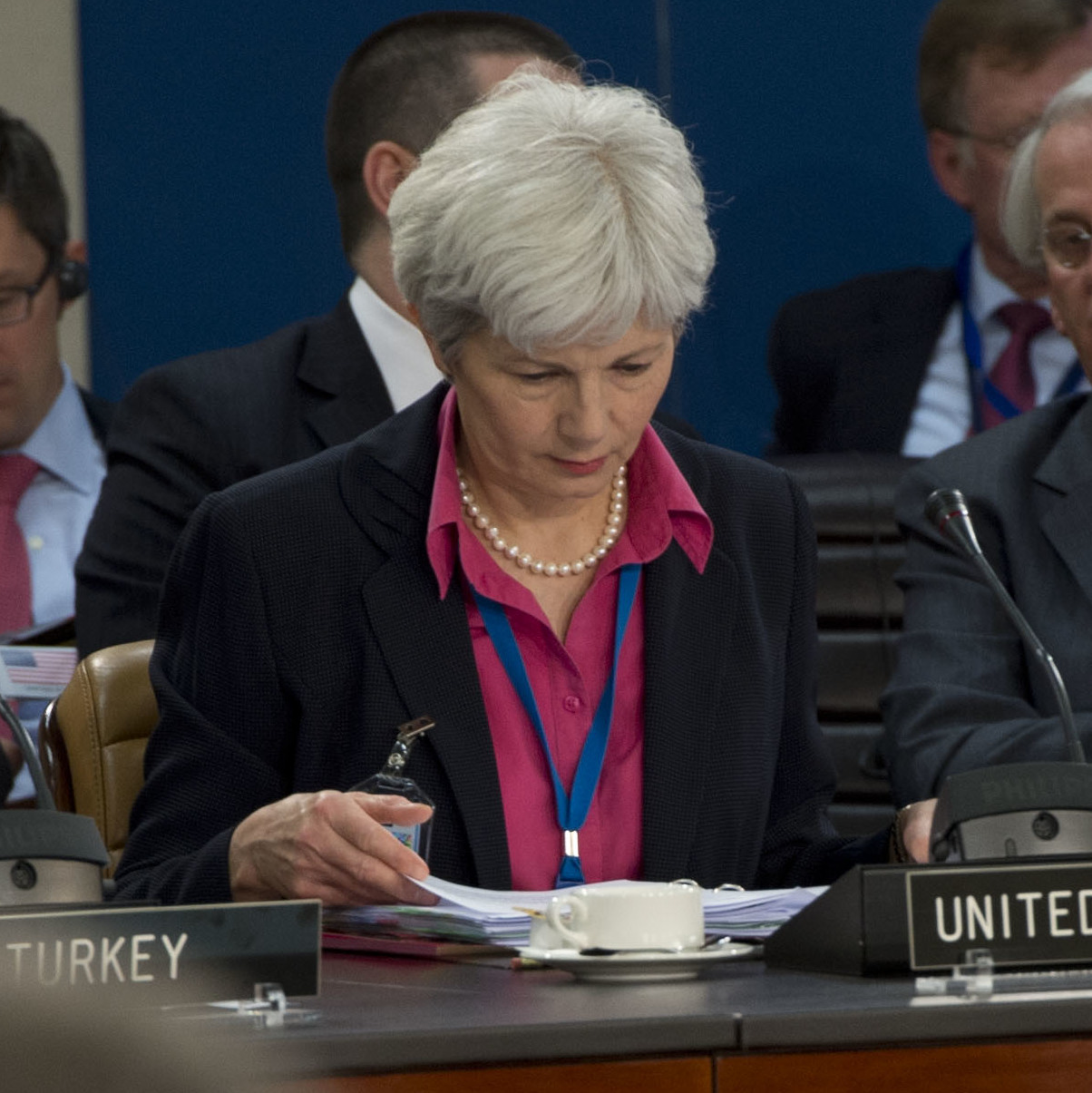
- Mariot Leslie UK Permanent Representative to the North Atlantic Council

Permanent Representative of the United Kingdom to NATO
- In office 2010–2014
- Preceded by: Stewart Eldon
- Succeeded by: Adam Thomson

Personal details
- Born: Alison Mariot Leslie; 25 June 1954 (age 72) Edinburgh, Scotland
- Education: George Watson's Ladies College; Leeds Girls' High School; St Hilda's College, Oxford

Dame Alison Mariot Leslie, DCMG FRSE (born 25 June 1954), known as Mariot Leslie, is a former British diplomat whose last post was Permanent Representative to NATO. When she was replaced at NATO it was announced that she would retire from the Diplomatic Service.

She was formerly director-general for defence and intelligence at the UK's Foreign and Commonwealth Office. She began her career in 1977 in the FCO Middle East Department and also held positions in Singapore, Bonn, Paris, Rome and Oslo.

== Honours ==
She was appointed Companion of the Order of St Michael and St George (CMG) in the 2005 New Year Honours and Dame Commander of the Order of St Michael and St George (DCMG) in the 2012 Birthday Honours.

Leslie received an Honorary Doctorate from Heriot-Watt University in 2013. She was elected a Fellow of the Royal Society of Edinburgh in 2021.

== Personal life ==
Born in Edinburgh in 1954, as Mariot Sanderson, she was educated at George Watson's Ladies College, Edinburgh, Leeds Girls' High School and St Hilda's College, Oxford (1972–75).

Sanderson married Andrew Leslie in 1978; the couple have two daughters.

== Diplomatic career (1977-present) ==
- 1977-1978: Joined the British Diplomatic Service; spent a year in the Middle East Department of the Foreign and Commonwealth Office, London (FCO)
- 1978-1981: British High Commission, Singapore
- 1982-1986: British Embassy, Bonn, as First Secretary with responsibility for the European Communities
- 1986-1987: Policy Planning Staff, FCO
- 1988-1990: Personnel Operations Department, FCO
- 1990-1992: Seconded to the French Foreign Ministry, Quai d'Orsay, Paris
- 1992-1993: Head of Environment, Science and Energy Department, FCO
- 1993-1995: Scottish Office Industry Department, Edinburgh
- 1996-1998: Head of Policy Planning Staff, FCO
- 1998-2001: Minister and Deputy Head of Mission, British Embassy, Rome
- 2002-2006: HM Ambassador, British Embassy, Oslo
- 2006-2007: Director, Defence and Strategic Threats and Counter-Terrorism Envoy, FCO
- 2007-2010: Director General Defence and Intelligence, FCO
- 2010-2014: HM Ambassador and Permanent Representative Joint Delegation of the UK to NATO
