= John Edyman =

John Edyman, D.D. was an English priest and academic in the first half of the sixteenth century.

Nobys was born in Norfolk. He was educated at Clare College, Cambridge, graduating B.A. in 1468; and B.D. in 1479–80. He became Fellow of Clare in 1473. He held livings at Fulbourn, Toppesfield and Wimbush. He was Archdeacon of Taunton from 1505 to 1509; Archdeacon of Norwich from 1509 to 1516; Precentor of St Paul's Cathedral from 1509 to 1510; and Master of Corpus Christi College, Cambridge from 1515 to 1516.
