= Michael Carey (priest) =

English Anglican priest

Michael Sausmarez Carey (7 December 1914 – 29 October 1985) was an English Anglican priest.

Carey was educated at Haileybury and Imperial Service College and Keble College, Oxford. He was ordained in 1939. After a curacy at St John’s Waterloo Road he became chaplain of Ripon College Cuddesdon. He was the Archdeacon of Ely from 1962 to 1970 and then Dean of Ely until 1982.

He and his wife Muriel Carey had two children, Elisabeth and Nicolas.

Church of England titles
Preceded by Cyril Patrick Hankey	Dean of Ely; 1970 – 1982	Succeeded by Charles Allan Shaw
