= Patrick Hankey =

English Anglican priest (1886–1973)

Cyril Patrick Hankey was an Anglican priest in the 20th century.

Hankey was born in 1886 and educated at Haileybury and Pembroke College, Cambridge. He was ordained in 1911 and was a curate at St Augustine's Kilburn. After this he was Vice principal of the Dorchester Missionary College. He then held incumbencies of St Matthew's Westminster and St Mary's the Less, Cambridge. Later he was Rural Dean of Watford and then of Bedford. He was appointed Dean of Ely in November 1950, a position he held for over 18 years. As an author he wrote, among other publications, Lives of the Serbian Saints, 1921; The Young Priest, 1933; A Confession of My Faith, 1940; and Signposts on the Christian Way, 1962.

He died on 9 December 1973.

== Notes ==
Church of England titles
| Preceded by Lionel Edward Blackburne | Dean of Ely; 1951 – 1969 | Succeeded by Michael Sausmarez Carey |
