= Mark Bonney =

Anglican priest

The Very Reverend Mark Bonney DL
- Dean of Ely
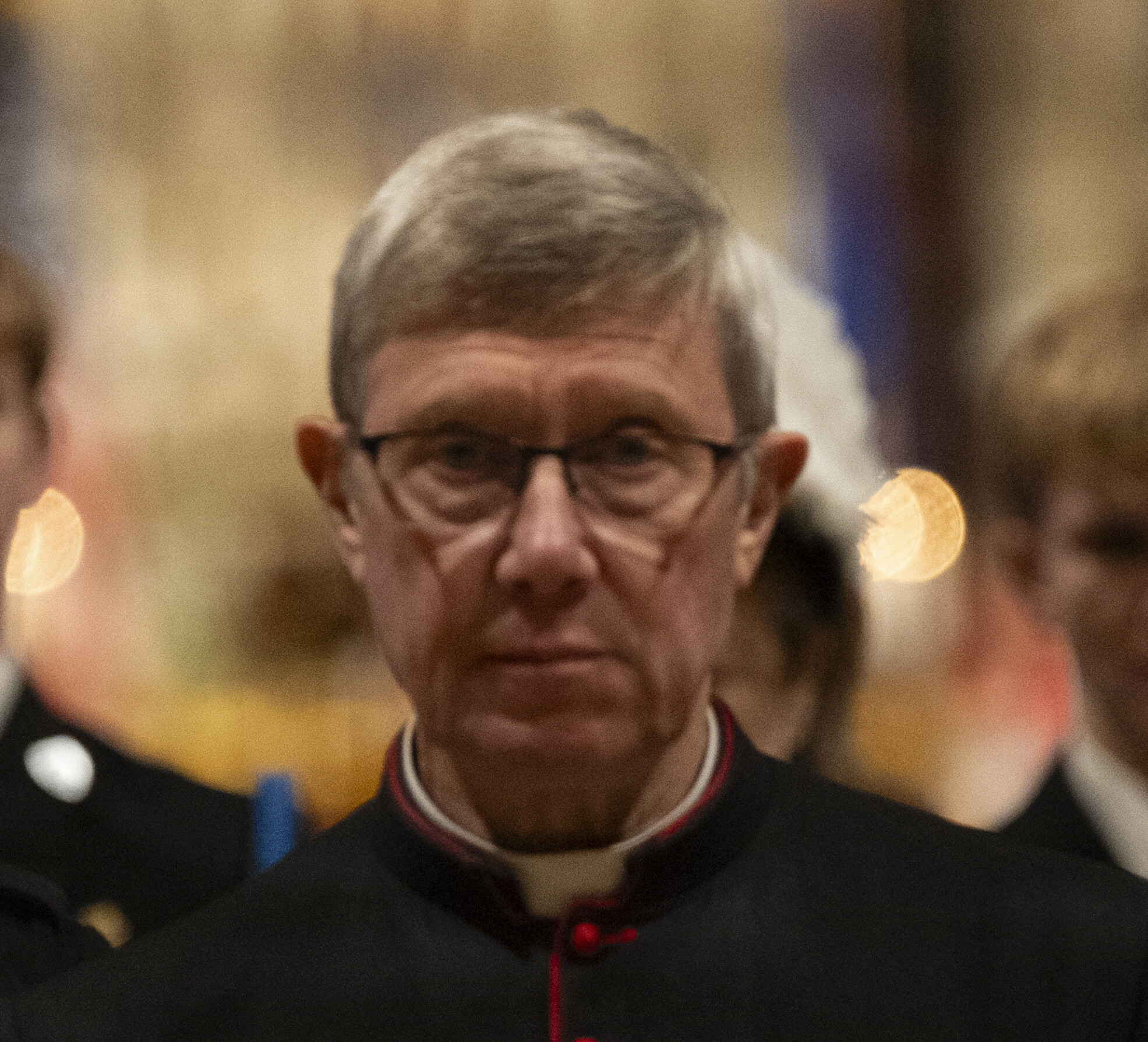
- Bonney at Ely Cathedral in 2025
- Church: Church of England
- Diocese: Diocese of Ely
- In office: 2012–present
- Previous post: Canon Treasurer of Salisbury Cathedral (2004–2012)

Orders
- Ordination: 1985 (deacon); 1986 (priest)

Personal details
- Born: Mark Philip John Bonney; 1957 (age 68–69)
- Denomination: Anglicanism
- Spouse: Katherine
- Children: Two daughters
- Education: St Catharine's College, Cambridge; St Stephen's House, Oxford

Mark Philip John Bonney DL (born 2 March 1957) is an Anglican priest. Since 2012, he has served as the dean of Ely.

== Early life ==
He was born in 1957. He was educated at Northgate Grammar School in Ipswich. Having been awarded a scholarship as a choral exhibitioner, he studied music at St Catharine's College, Cambridge. He graduated from the University of Cambridge with a Bachelor of Arts (BA) degree in 1978; his BA was promoted to a Master of Arts (MA Cantab) degree in 1982. He gained a Blue in both Tennis and Golf while studying for this degree.

Having completed his music degree, he taught the subject for three years. He left teaching to train for the priesthood and entered St Stephen's House, Oxford. Having studied theology, he graduated from the University of Oxford with a BA degree in 1984; this degree was promoted to an MA Oxon in 1989. He then undertook a further year of ministerial training at St Stephen's House.

== Ordained ministry ==
Bonney was ordained in the Church of England as a deacon in 1985 and as a priest in 1986. From 1985 to 1988, he served his curacy at St Peter's Church, Stockton-on-Tees. He then joined St Alban's Abbey, where he was the chaplain from 1988 to 1990 and served as precentor from 1990 to 1992. He was vicar of the Church of St Mary, Eaton Bray (the parish of Eaton Bray with Edlesborough) from 1992 to 1996. Next, from 1996 to 2004, he was the rector of the Church of St Peter, Great Berkhamsted (parish of Great Berkhamsted). In addition, from 2002 to 2004, he served as Rural Dean of Berkhamsted.

In 2004, he left the Diocese of St Albans after 16 years of service, to join the staff of Salisbury Cathedral. Between 2004 and 2012, he was a canon residentiary and treasurer of the cathedral. In April 2012, it was announced that he would be the next dean of Ely. On 22 September, he was installed as dean at a service in Ely Cathedral. In October 2025, it was announced that he would be retiring as dean in July 2026.

== Personal life ==
Bonney is married to Katherine, a primary school teacher. Together they have two children, daughters Hannah and Eleanor. In 2023, he was appointed a deputy lieutenant of Cambridgeshire.

Church of England titles
Preceded by Michael Chandler	Dean of Ely; 2012–present	Incumbent
