= John Lambe (priest) =

English Anglican dean

John Lambe (b London 30 December 1649; d Ely 10 August 1708) was an Anglican Dean at the end of the 16th century and the beginning of the 17th.

Lambe was educated at Sidney Sussex College, Cambridge. He was Rector of Wheathampstead from 1673 and Dean of Ely from 1693, holding both positions until his death. He was also a Chaplain to William III of England

Church of England titles
Preceded by John Spencer	Dean of Ely; 1693–1707	Succeeded by Charles Roderick
