= Thomas Jegon =

Thomas Jegon (died 2 March 1618) was a priest and academic in the late sixteenth and the early seventeenth centuries.

Jegon was the son of Robert Jegon of Coggeshall, and the younger brother of John Jegon, Bishop of Norwich.

He matriculated at Queens' College, Cambridge in 1580, graduating B.A. in 1584, M.A. in 1587, D.D. in 1602. He was appointed Fellow of Corpus Christi College, Cambridge in 1587, and succeeded his brother John as Master of Corpus Christi in 1603. He was Vice-Chancellor of the University of Cambridge from 1608 to 1609. He held livings at Sible Hedingham and Ashen. He was Archdeacon of Norwich from 1604 until his death on 2 March 1618.
