= Thomas Cosyn =

English priest and academic (died 1515)

Thomas Cosyn (died 1515) was a priest and academic in the late fifteenth and early sixteenth centuries.

Cosyn was born in Norfolk. He was educated at Corpus Christi College, Cambridge, graduating Bachelor of Divinity in 1469. He became a Fellow of Corpus Christi in 1462; and Proctor in 1470. He served as chaplain to Elizabeth Talbot, Duchess of Norfolk and held livings at Denton, Norfolk, Kelling and Landbeach. He became Master of Corpus in 1487 where he is said to have "built the buttresses in the old court" among other constructions and benefactions to the college.

He was Chancellor of the University of Cambridge from 1490 to 1494; and Lady Margaret's Professor of Divinity from 1504 to 1506. He likely died on 9 July 1515.
