= John Aldrich =

John Aldrich may refer to:

- John Aldrich (political scientist) (born 1947), American political scientist and author
- John Aldrich (MP) (by 1520–1582), English politician
- John Merton Aldrich (1866–1934), American zoologist and entomologist
- John Warren Aldrich (1906–1995), American ornithologist

== See also ==
- John Aldridge (born 1958), Irish football player
