= John Rudd (preacher) =

English clergyman (1568–1640)

John Rudd (1568 – 13 July 1640) was an English clergyman who served as Vicar of Shephall, Hertfordshire, from the late sixteenth century until his death. Early in his career he became involved in a celebrated dispute at the University of Cambridge after preaching views regarded as sympathetic to Puritanism, bringing him into conflict with the Vice-Chancellor, John Jegon, and Archbishop John Whitgift. He later became known as a preacher, scholar and benefactor, whose will established charitable endowments in Hertfordshire and County Durham.

== Early life and education ==
The circumstances of Rudd's birth are uncertain. William Urwick stated that he was born in 1568 and educated at Christ's College, Cambridge. However, the entry in Alumni Cantabrigienses identifies a John Rudd who later became Vicar of Shephall as the son of William Rudd of Norfolk. He entered Gonville and Caius College, Cambridge, in 1583 before migrating to St John's College and subsequently Christ's College, graduating BA in 1587–88 and proceeding MA in 1591.

Evidence from Rudd's will has led some historians to suggest that he may instead have been the son of the Revd John Rudd, prebendary of Durham Cathedral and former chaplain to Edward VI, although this identification remains uncertain.

== Cambridge controversy ==
During the 1590s Rudd served as lecturer at Great St Mary's Church, Cambridge. On 30 January 1596 he preached a sermon criticising the quality of preaching within the Church of England, arguing that many sermons relied excessively on human learning rather than the guidance of the Holy Spirit. His remarks were interpreted by university authorities as an attack upon the universities and the educated ministry.

The Vice-Chancellor, John Jegon, summoned Rudd before the heads of houses. Although he initially promised to retract the disputed propositions, he instead defended them in writing. Jegon referred the matter to Archbishop John Whitgift, before whom Rudd appeared in the Court of High Commission. Facing suspension from preaching, he eventually acknowledged his "oversight" and, on returning to Cambridge, delivered a public recantation in Great St Mary's Church.

William Urwick regarded the affair as an important episode in the early history of English Puritanism. Although Rudd's views were clearly influenced by the evangelical theology associated with Cambridge figures such as William Perkins, his subsequent career remained firmly within the established Church of England.

== Vicar of Shephall ==
Soon after the Cambridge controversy, Rudd was instituted as Vicar of Shephall, Hertfordshire, a benefice he held for approximately forty-five years until his death in 1640. According to the diocesan visitation of 1603, he preached twice every Sunday and devoted the afternoon service to catechising members of his parish.

Rudd acquired a reputation as a conscientious pastor and scholar. An inventory of his library compiled after his death records works by leading Protestant theologians, including William Perkins and Joseph Hall, together with patristic and classical authors, reflecting both Reformed theology and conventional Anglican scholarship.

== Will and benefactions ==
Rudd made his will on 22 February 1638/39. Having never married and possessing considerable personal wealth, he distributed substantial sums among relatives, servants, parishioners and charitable causes.

His principal benefactions included:

- an endowment to provide bread annually for the poor of six parishes in County Durham;
- scholarships at Christ's College, Cambridge, with preference given to descendants of his family, sons of officials of Durham Cathedral, and pupils from Stevenage, Hertford and St Albans grammar schools;
- gifts of books and money to neighbouring clergy;
- charitable bequests to the poor of Shephall and surrounding parishes.

His will also provides valuable evidence for his extensive family connections, education, religious outlook and social network.

== Death and memorial ==
Rudd died at Shephall on 13 July 1640, aged 72, and was buried in the chancel of St Mary's Church, where a monument was erected in his memory. Venn recorded the opening lines of its monumental inscription:

Son of Thunder, Son of the Dove.
Full of Hot Zeal, full of True Love.
In preaching Truth, in living right,
A burning Lamp, a shining Light.

The monument survives in St Mary's Church, although later restoration has altered some of its original decorative details.

== Sources ==
- Spicer, C. M. Tyme out of Mind: A History of Shephall. Stevenage, 1984.
- Urwick, William. Memorials of Nonconformity in Hertfordshire. London: Jackson, Walford and Hodder, 1884.
- Venn, J. A.; Venn, J. (eds.). Alumni Cantabrigienses. Part I, vol. III. Cambridge: Cambridge University Press, 1924.
- White, Geoffrey. "John Rudd and his Will." Stevenage Museum. 16 September 2024.
