= John Spenser (Jesuit) =

English Jesuit

John Spenser (alias Vincent Hatcliffe and John Tyrrwhit, 1601–1671) was an English Jesuit theologian.

== Life ==
Spenser was born in Lincolnshire; converted to Catholicism while a student at Christ's College, Cambridge; entered the Society of Jesus in 1627; and was ordained in 1632. Spenser served in a number of different locations:

- Watten in 1636
- the College of St. Hugh in 1639
- Liège in 1642, as professor of moral theology
- Antwerp in 1655
- the Residence of St. George in 1658 or 1659, as Superior
- Grafton in 1667, as chaplain to the Earl of Shrewsbury.

Spenser took part, at Whitsuntide, 1657, in a conference, much spoken of at the time, with two Anglican divines, Dr. Peter Gunning and Dr. John Pearson, afterward bishops. All the disputants, including Spenser's Catholic colleague, Dr. John Lenthall, M.D., were Cambridge men, and may have known one another.

== Works ==
An account of the conference was published in Paris, 1658, under the title, Schism Unmasked, probably by Spenser. His other works include:

- Scripture Mistaken: the Ground of Protestants and Common Plea of all new Reformers against the ancient Catholic Religion of England (Antwerp, 1655)
- [Thirty-Six] Questions propounded to the Doctors of the Reformed Religion (Paris, 1657)
