= William Patterson (priest) =

William James Patterson CBE (25 September 1930 – 6 April 2002) was an Anglican priest.

He was born on 25 September 1930, educated at Haileybury and Balliol College, Oxford and ordained in 1955. After a curacy at St John Baptist, Newcastle upon Tyne he was Priest in Charge of Rio Claro with Mayaro in Trinidad. On his return to England he was Rector of Esher and then Little Downham. From 1979 to 1984 he was Archdeacon of Wisbech when he became Dean of Ely, a post he held for six years. The cathedral itself was in urgent need of repair, and Patterson launched an appeal for £4 million. He was Vicar of Abbotsley until 1993. He died on 6 April 2002.

Church of England titles
| Preceded by Charles Allan Shaw | Dean of Ely; 1984 – 1990 | Succeeded by Michael John Higgins |
