= John Thomson (diplomat) =

British diplomat (1927–2018)

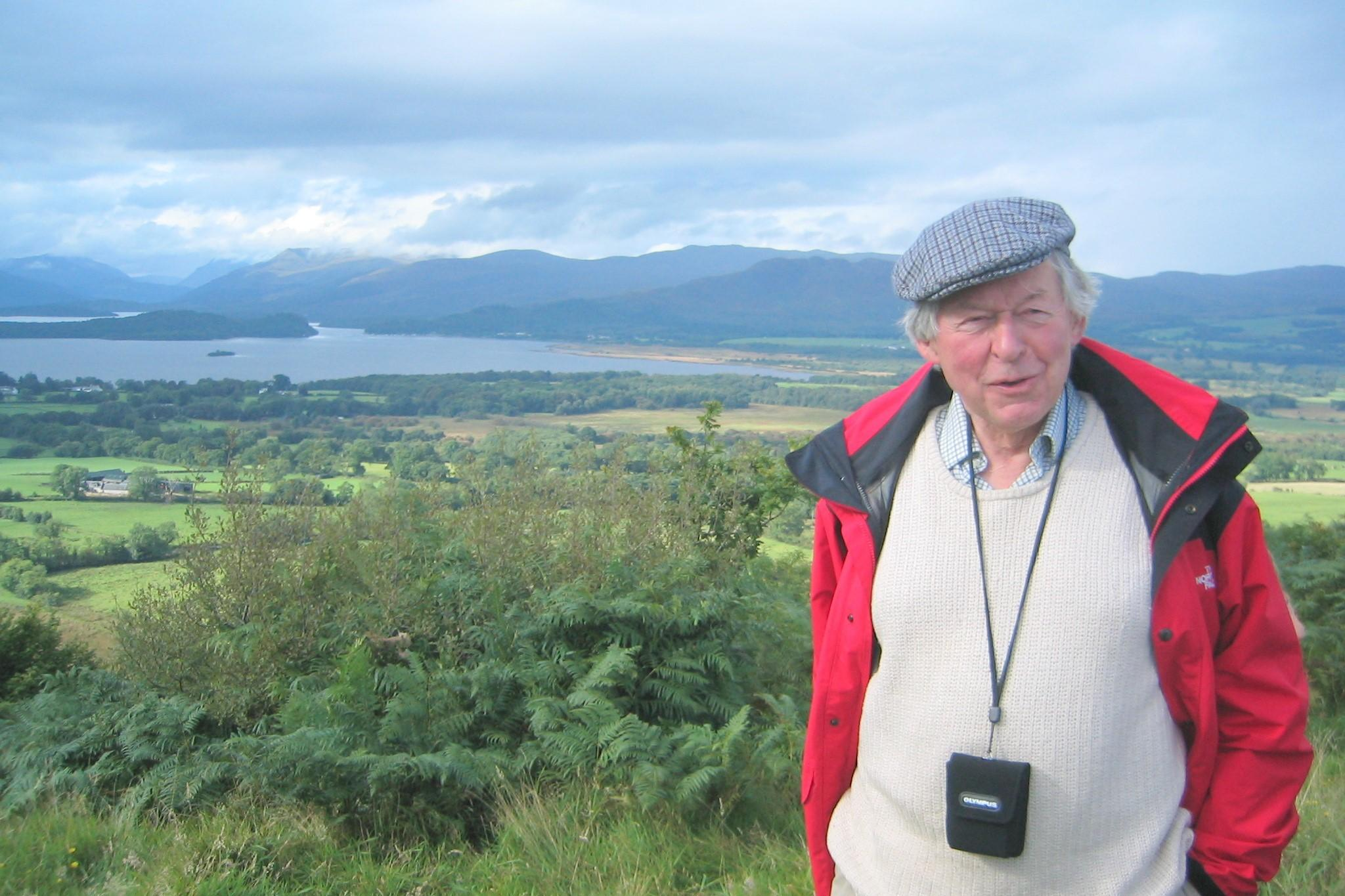
Sir John Thomson (GCMG)

Sir John Adam Thomson, GCMG (27 April 1927 – 3 June 2018) was a British diplomat who served as High Commissioner to India and Permanent Representative to the United Nations.

== Career ==
John Thomson was educated at Phillips Exeter Academy, the University of Aberdeen and Trinity College, Cambridge. He joined the Foreign Service in 1950, and served at Jeddah, Damascus and Washington, D.C. as well as posts at the Foreign office (later the Foreign and Commonwealth Office, FCO) and a secondment to the Cabinet Office. He was Minister and deputy Permanent Representative to the North Atlantic Council from 1972 to 1973; head of the UK delegation to Mutual and Balanced Force Reductions exploratory talks in Vienna in 1973; assistant Under-Secretary at the FCO from 1973 to 1976; High Commissioner to India from 1977 to 1982; and Permanent Representative to the United Nations from 1982 to 1987.

Thomson retired from the Foreign Service in 1987 and, among many activities, was Associate Member of Nuffield College, Oxford, from 1987 to 1991, chairman of Minority Rights Group International from 1991 to 1999, and a trustee of the Indian National Trust UK Trust from 1991 to 1999. He was an adviser to the British American Security Information Council and research affiliate within the Science, Technology and Global Security Working Group at Massachusetts Institute of Technology.

Thomson was appointed a Companion of the Order of St Michael and St George in the 1972 New Year Honours, knighted as a Knight Commander of the Order of St Michael and St George in the 1978 New Year Honours, and raised to Knight Grand Cross of the Order of St Michael and St George in the 1985 Birthday Honours.

Thomson was the son of Sir George Paget Thomson and the grandson of Sir J. J. Thomson, both winners of the Nobel Prize in Physics. His son is Sir Adam Thomson.

== Publications ==
- Crusader Castles (with Robin Fedden), Murray, 1957. ISBN 0719504236

Diplomatic posts
Preceded by Sir Michael Walker	High Commissioner to India; 1977–1982	Succeeded by Sir Robert Wade-Gery
Preceded by Sir Anthony Parsons	Permanent Representative to the United Nations; 1982–1987	Succeeded by Sir Crispin Tickell
