= Michael Chandler (priest) =

British priest

Michael John Chandler (born 27 May 1945) is an Anglican priest and author.

He was educated at Brasted Place College, Lincoln Theological College, and King's College London (PhD), and ordained in 1973. He held curacies at St Dunstan’s Canterbury and then St John the Baptist, Margate. After this he was the incumbent at Newington and then Hackington. He was a Canon Residentiary at Canterbury Cathedral from 1995 to 2003 when he became Dean of Ely, a post he retired from on 30 September 2011.

Among other books he has written The Life and Work of John Mason Neale (1995), The Life and Work of Henry Parry Liddon (2000), An Introduction to the Oxford Movement (2003) and Queen Victoria's Archbishops of Canterbury (Sacristy Press, 2019).

Church of England titles
Preceded by Michael John Higgins	Dean of Ely; 2003–2011	Succeeded by Mark Bonney
