= George Paget Thomson =

British physicist (1892–1975)

Sir George Paget Thomson FRS FRSE
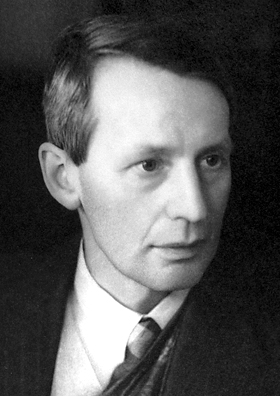
- Thomson in 1937

43rd Master of Corpus Christi College, Cambridge
- In office 1952–1962
- Preceded by: Sir Will Spens
- Succeeded by: Sir Frank Godbould Lee

Personal details
- Born: 3 May 1892 Cambridge, England
- Died: 10 September 1975 (aged 83) Cambridge, England
- Spouse: Kathleen Buchanan Smith (m. 1924; died 1941)
- Children: 4, including John
- Parent: J. J. Thomson (father)
- Relatives: George Edward Paget (grandfather); George Adam Smith (father-in-law); Adam Thomson (grandson)
- Education: University of Cambridge (BA)
- Known for: Electron diffraction
- Awards: Howard N. Potts Medal (1932); Nobel Prize in Physics (1937); Hughes Medal (1939); Royal Medal (1949); Faraday Medal (1960)
- Scientific career
- Fields: Physics
- Workplaces: Corpus Christi College, Cambridge; University of Aberdeen; Imperial College London
- Academic advisors: J. J. Thomson

Sir George Paget Thomson (3 May 1892 – 10 September 1975) was a British experimental physicist who shared the 1937 Nobel Prize in Physics with Clinton Davisson "for their experimental discovery of the diffraction of electrons by crystals." His father, J. J. Thomson, won the Nobel Prize in 1906 "for his theoretical and experimental investigations on the conduction of electricity by gases". It has been said that the elder Thomson won the Nobel for showing the electron is a particle, the younger for showing it is a wave.

== Education and military service ==
George Paget Thomson was born on 3 May 1892 in Cambridge, England, the son of physicist and Nobel laureate J. J. Thomson and Rose Elisabeth Paget, the daughter of George Edward Paget.

Thomson attended The Perse School, before going on to read mathematics and physics at Trinity College, Cambridge. After graduating in 1913, he went to the Cavendish Laboratory to do research under his father, until the outbreak of World War I the following year, when he was commissioned into the Queen's Royal West Surrey Regiment. After brief service in France, he transferred to the Royal Flying Corps the following year to undertake research on aerodynamics at the Royal Aircraft Establishment at Farnborough and elsewhere. He resigned from his commission as a captain in 1920.

== Career and research ==
In 1919, Thomson became a Fellow of and a lecturer at Corpus Christi College, Cambridge. In 1922, he was appointed Professor of Natural Philosophy at the University of Aberdeen in Scotland.

Whereas Thomson's father, J. J. Thomson (winner of the 1906 Nobel Prize in Physics), had seen the electron as a particle, the son demonstrated that the electron could be diffracted like a wave. By scattering electrons through thin metallic films (3 × 10^{−8} m thick) with known crystal structures, such as aluminium, gold and platinum, he found the dimensions of the observed diffraction patterns. In each case, his observed diffractions were within 5 percent of the predicted values given by Louis de Broglie's wave theory. This discovery provided further evidence for the principle of wave–particle duality, which had first been posited by de Broglie in the 1920s as what is often called the de Broglie hypothesis.

In 1937, Thomson was awarded the Nobel Prize in Physics for his work in discovering the wave-like properties of matter. He shared the prize with the American physicist Clinton Davisson, who had made the same discovery independently.

In 1929, Thomson became a non-resident lecturer at Cornell University in Ithaca, New York. In 1930, he was appointed Professor of Physics at Imperial College London. In the late 1930s and during World War II, he specialised in nuclear physics, concentrating on practical military applications. In particular, he was the chairman of the crucial MAUD Committee in 1940–1941 that concluded that an atomic bomb was feasible. In later life, he continued this work on nuclear energy, but also wrote works on aerodynamics and the value of science in society.

== Later life and death ==
From 1952 to 1962, Thomson served as Master of Corpus Christi College, Cambridge. In 1964, the college honoured his tenure with the George Thomson Building, a work of modernist architecture on the college's Leckhampton campus.

Thomson gave the address "Two aspects of science" as President of the British Association for 1959–1960.

Thomson died on 10 September 1975 in Cambridge at the age of 83. He is buried in Grantchester parish churchyard to the south of Cambridge.

== Family ==
In 1924, Thomson married Kathleen Buchanan Smith, the daughter of George Adam Smith, who served as Principal of the University of Aberdeen (1909–1935). They had two sons and two daughters. Kathleen died in 1941.

One of their sons, John Thomson (1927–2018), became a senior diplomat who served as High Commissioner to India (1977–1982) and as Permanent Representative to the United Nations (1982–1987). Their grandson, Adam Thomson (born 1955), also became a senior diplomat, serving as High Commissioner to Pakistan (2010–2013) and as Permanent Representative to NATO (2014–2016). Another son, David Paget Thomson (1931–2022), was a merchant banker. One daughter, Lillian Clare Thomson (born 1929), married the South African economist and mountaineer Johannes de Villiers Graaff.

== Recognition ==
=== Memberships ===
Year	Organisation	Type	Ref.
1923	Royal Society of Edinburgh	Fellow	
1930	Royal Society	Fellow	

=== Awards ===
Year	Organisation	Award	Citation	Ref.
1932	Franklin Institute	Howard N. Potts Medal	"For diffraction of electrons by thin films."	
1937	Royal Swedish Academy of Sciences	Nobel Prize in Physics	"For their [Thomson and Clinton Davisson] experimental discovery of the diffraction of electrons by crystals."	
1939	Royal Society	Hughes Medal	"For his important discoveries in connexion with the diffraction of electrons by matter."	
1949	Royal Society	Royal Medal	"For his distinguished contributions to many branches of atomic physics, and especially for his work in establishing the wave properties of the electron."	
1960	Institution of Electrical Engineers	Faraday Medal	—	

=== Honours ===
Year	Country	Honour	Ref.
1943	United Kingdom	Knight Bachelor	

== See also ==
- Matter wave
- Pinch (plasma physics)
- Z-pinch

== Notes ==
Academic offices
Preceded by Sir William Spens	Master of Corpus Christi College, Cambridge; 1952–1962	Succeeded by Sir Frank Godbould Lee
