= Exposition of the Creed =

An Exposition of the Creed
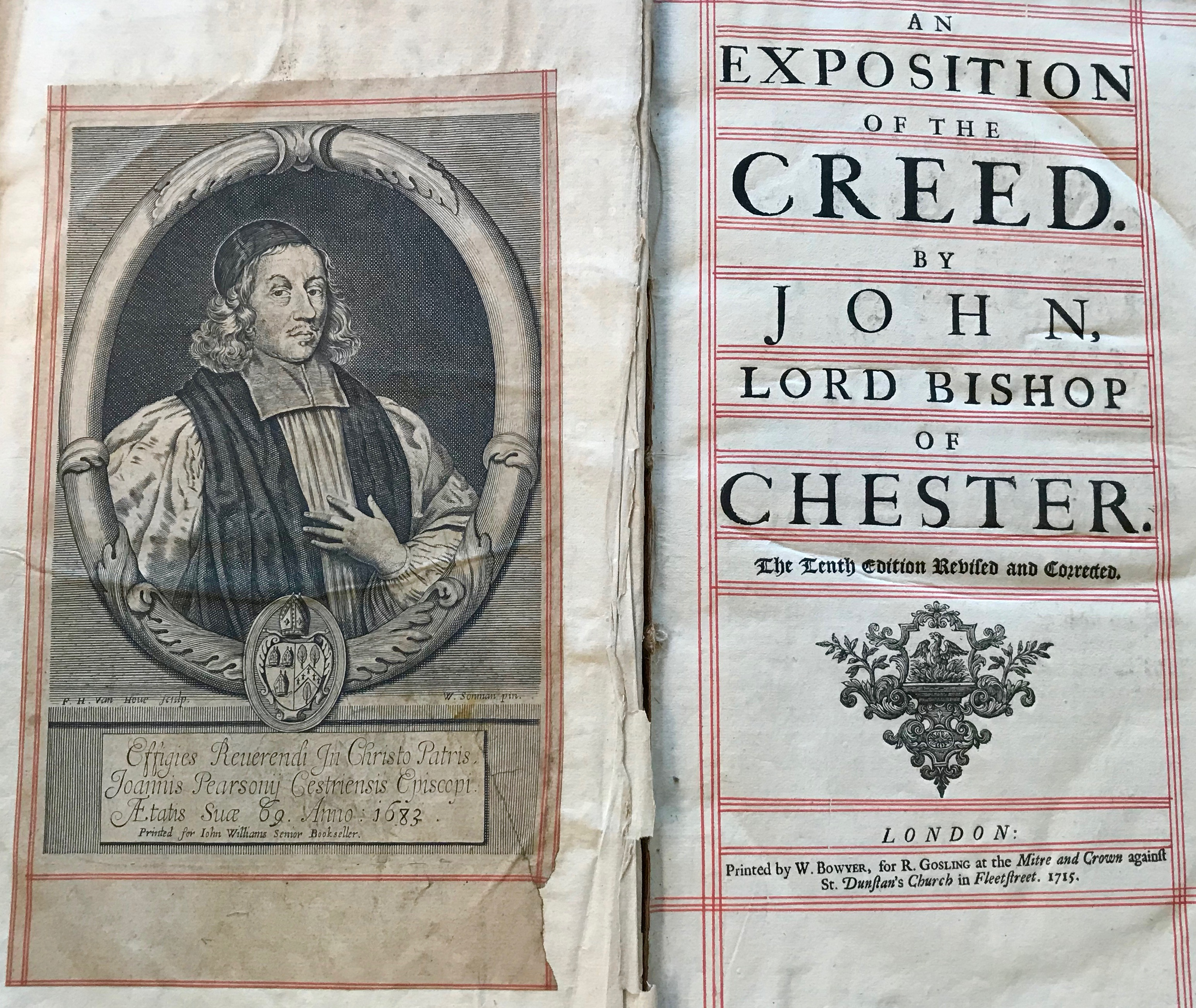
- The frontispiece and title page of the tenth edition (1715)
- Author: John Pearson, Bishop of Chester
- Subject: Apostles' Creed
- Genre: Anglican theology
- Publication date: 1659
- Publication place: England
- ISBN: 978-1144244369

An Exposition of the Creed was a work by the English theologian John Pearson which was first published in 1659. It was based on sermons he delivered at St Clement's, Eastcheap. It was one of the most influential works on the Apostles' Creed in the Anglican Church.
