= Adam Thomson (diplomat) =

British diplomat (born 1955)

Sir Adam Thomson KCMG
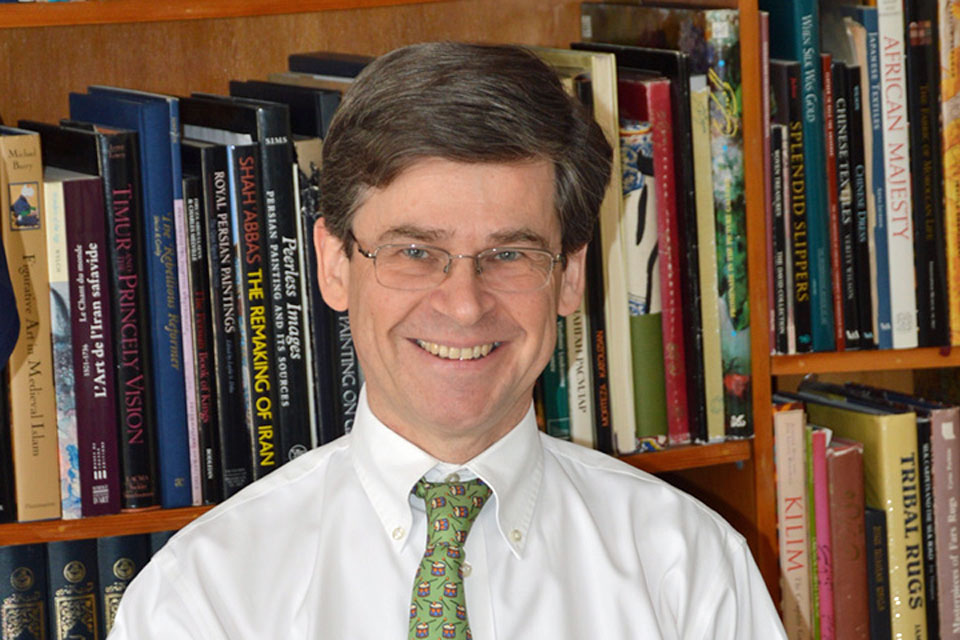

Permanent Representative of the United Kingdom to NATO
- In office 2014–2016
- Monarch: Elizabeth II
- Prime Minister: David Cameron
- Preceded by: Dame Mariot Leslie
- Succeeded by: Paul Johnston (acting)

British High Commissioner to Pakistan
- In office 2010–2014
- Monarch: Elizabeth II
- Prime Minister: David Cameron
- Preceded by: Robert Brinkley
- Succeeded by: Philip Barton

Personal details
- Born: Adam McClure Thomson; 1 July 1955 (age 70)
- Spouse: Fariba Shirazi
- Children: 3

Sir Adam McClure Thomson KCMG (born 1 July 1955) is a former British diplomat who was director of the European Leadership Network, a pan-European think tank based in London. He served as Permanent Representative to NATO between 2014 and 2016.

== Education ==
Adam McClure Thomson was educated at King's College School, Cambridge, Westminster School, Trinity College, Cambridge and the John F. Kennedy School of Government at Harvard University.

== Career ==
He joined the Foreign and Commonwealth Office (FCO) in 1978 and served in Moscow, Brussels, Washington, D.C. and New Delhi as well as at the FCO in London. He was deputy Permanent Representative to the United Nations in New York, with the rank of Ambassador, 2002–06; Director South Asia & Afghanistan at the FCO 2006–09 and High Commissioner to Pakistan 2010–14 before being appointed Permanent Representative to NATO in 2014.

While in Pakistan, Thomson caused some controversy when he said that the country's government had failed to deliver on reform and called for a "radical change".

== Honours and accolades ==
Thomson was appointed a Companion of the Order of St Michael and St George in 2009, and knighted as a Knight Commander of the Order of St Michael and St George in the 2014 New Year Honours. He has been a member of the Dean's Alumni Leadership Council at Harvard Kennedy School.

== Family ==
Thomson is the eldest son of Sir John Thomson, also a diplomat. He is the grandson of Sir George Paget Thomson and the great-grandson of Sir J. J. Thomson, both winners of the Nobel Prize in Physics. He is married to Fariba Shirazi, a native of Iran who studied architecture in Tehran and art history in London, and has worked at the Metropolitan Museum of Art in New York and the Victoria and Albert Museum in London. They have a son and two daughters.

Diplomatic posts
Preceded by Robert Brinkley	British High Commissioner to Pakistan; 2010–2014	Succeeded by Philip Barton
Preceded by Dame Mariot Leslie	British Permanent Representative to NATO; 2014–2016	Succeeded by Paul Johnston (acting)
