= John Copcot =

English cleric and academic (died 1590)

John Copcot, DD (died 1590) was an English cleric and academic, becoming Vice-Chancellor of the University of Cambridge and Master of Corpus Christi College, Cambridge.

== Early life and family ==
Copcot was born in Calais, son of Adam Copcott, an English merchant. He was admitted as a scholar of Trinity College, Cambridge in 1562, and took his BA in 1566.

== Clerical career ==
Copcot's clerical career began at Cambridge, and he was licensed as one of the preachers of the university in 1576. Copcot was a defender of the Anglican Church and its hierarchy, particularly against dissenters and Puritans. In the 1580s, he preached in London in favour of the established church.

The roles he held within the Church included non-resident rector of St Dunstan-in-the-East in London from 1580 to 1590 (in which role he sometimes represented the clergy of London in convocation); Prebendary in the church of Chichester from 1586 to 1590; Rector of Orwell, Cambridgeshire from 1586 to 1590; and Chaplain to John Whitgift, Archbishop of Canterbury.

== Academic career ==
Copcot became a fellow of Trinity College in 1567 and took his MA in 1570. His specialty was as a critic in Latin and Greek and he had a reputation as a hard-working scholar and proponent of literary studies. He was awarded the degree of Bachelor of Divinity in 1577, and of Doctor of Divinity, the highest of the degrees awarded by the universities of Oxford and Cambridge, in 1582.

Copcot was appointed as Vice-Chancellor of the University of Cambridge in 1586, and was the last Vice-Chancellor who was not already head of a college.

His one-year term as Vice-Chancellor was characterised by conflict with radical Puritan interests at Christ College, Cambridge and elsewhere within the university, over which he was in communication with William Cecil, Baron Burghley, leading minister of Elizabeth I. As Vice-Chancellor, he took measures to suppress non-conformity; he also came into conflict with authorities representing the town.

He succeeded Dr Robert Norgate as Master of Corpus Christi College, Cambridge on 6 November 1587, having been recommended by William Cecil. As with his term as Vice-Chancellor, his time in charge of the college was characterised by contention. He remained in the role until his death in early August 1590.

Academic offices
Preceded by Humphrey Tyndall	Vice-Chancellor of the University of Cambridge; 1586-1587	Succeeded by Thomas Legge
Preceded by Robert Norgate	Master of Corpus Christi College, Cambridge; 1587-1590	Succeeded by John Jegon
