= Lionel Blackburne =

British Anglican priest (1874–1951)

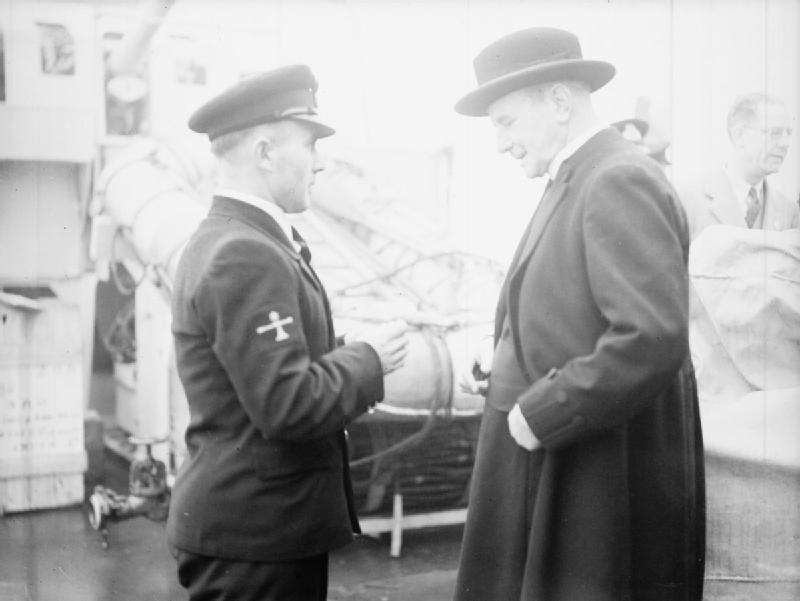
Lionel Blackburne (Dean of Ely at 8 December 1943)

Lionel Edward Blackburne (2 November 1874–4 August 1951) was an Anglican priest in the second quarter of the 20th century.

He was born 2 November 1874 and educated at Lancing College and Clare College, Cambridge. Ordained in 1890, he began his ecclesiastical career with a curacies at All Saints, Leamington and St Martin Potternewton. After this he was Vicar of St Wilfrid’s, Bradford then Rural Dean of Portsmouth. From 1922 to 1936 he was Archdeacon of Surrey and from 1930 also Canon Residentiary at Guildford Cathedral. He was Dean of Ely from 1936 to 1950. He died on 4 August 1951.
His brother was Dean of Bristol and nephew Bishop of Thetford.

== Notes ==
Church of England titles
Preceded by Alexander Francis Kirkpatrick	Dean of Ely; 1936 – 1950	Succeeded by Cyril Patrick Hankey
