= Michael Higgins (priest) =

Anglican priest

Michael John Higgins OBE was an Anglican priest.

He was born on 31 December 1935, educated at Whitchurch Grammar School, Cardiff, the University of Birmingham and Gonville and Caius College, Cambridge. He was a lecturer in English Law at the University of Birmingham before preparing for ordination at Ridley Hall, Cambridge. He was a curate at Ormskirk Parish Church from 1965 to 1968 and then Selection Secretary for the Advisory Council for Church Ministry until 1974. He was Vicar of Frome and then Rector of Preston before his appointment as Dean of Ely in 1991, a post he held for 12 years.

Church of England titles
Preceded by William Patterson	Dean of Ely; 1991 – 2003	Succeeded by Michael John Chandler
