= William Fuller (priest) =

English Dean of Ely and Dean of Durham

William Fuller (c. 1580–1659) was dean of Ely and later dean of Durham. He was in trouble with parishioners and Parliament during the early 1640s.

== Life ==
Born in or about 1580, the son of Andrew Fuller of Hadleigh, Suffolk, William Fuller was educated at Trinity College, Cambridge. He was a fellow of St Catharine Hall, Cambridge, where he took the degree of D.D. in 1625, and is said to have been a good linguist and an excellent preacher. These gifts recommended him to James I, who made him one of his chaplains. By Sir Gervase Clifton he was presented to the rectory of Weston, Nottinghamshire. Under Charles I he was continued in his chaplaincy, and on 3 July 1628 he received a dispensation to hold also the vicarage of St Giles-without-Cripplegate, London.

On the death of Henry Caesar, 27 June 1636, he was promoted to the deanery of Ely. In October 1641 some of the parishioners of St Giles's petitioned parliament for his removal. They complained that, though the parish was very populous and the living worth £700 a year, Fuller was pluralist, non-resident, and a 'popish innovator.' Altogether eight articles were exhibited against him. They alleged against Fuller's curate, Timothy Hutton, that he drank, danced and sang profane songs. The House of Commons summoned him as a delinquent, for the content of his sermons. For refusing to attend he was ordered into the custody of the serjeant-at-arms, but on giving substantial bail he was released on 11 November 1641. In July 1642 Fuller and Hutton, were sent for on a charge of having read the king's last declaration in church. Fuller denied having given orders for it to be read; he had in fact enjoined Hutton not to read it until directed. He was discharged but Hutton was committed a prisoner to the king's bench, where he remained for nearly a month.

Fuller's money was ordered to be confiscated 18 February 1643. By warrant of the Earl of Essex, he asserted, £500 was taken from him. In 1645 he was in attendance upon the king at Oxford, and was incorporated in his doctor's degree on 12 August of that year. Charles, who admired his preaching, made him dean of Durham, in which he was installed on 6 March 1646. Ultimately he retired to London, and died in the parish of St Giles, Cripplegate, on 13 May 1659, aged 79. The authorities having refused his relatives' request that he might be buried in the church of St Giles, he was interred at the upper end of the south aisle of St Vedast, Foster Lane.

== Works ==
Fuller published:

- A Sermon [on Ephes. iv. 7] preached before his Maiestie at Dover Castle, London, 1625.
- The Movrning of Mount Libanon ... A Sermon [on Zech. xi. 2] preached . . . 1627. In commemoration of the Lady Frances Clifton, &c., London, 1628.

From the dedication to Sir Gervase Clifton it is learned that Fuller preached the funeral sermon of the first Lady Clifton, which, however, was circulated in manuscript.

== Family ==
By his wife Katherine, who survived him, Fuller left three sons, William, Robert, and Gervase, and two daughters, Jane, married to Brian Walton.
