= John Jegon =

English academic and Bishop of Norwich

The Right Reverend John Jegon
- Bishop of Norwich
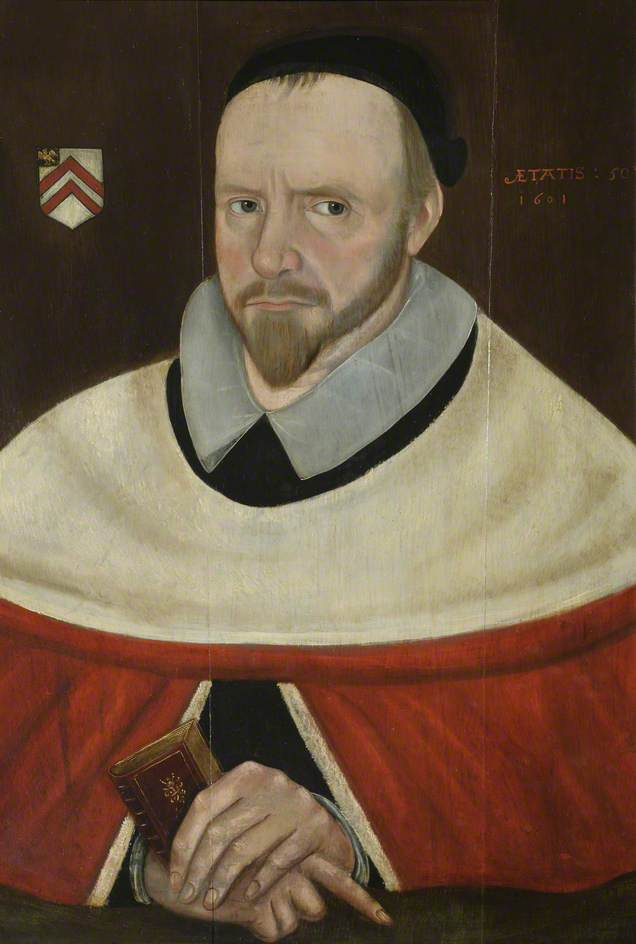
- Church: Church of England
- Diocese: Diocese of Norwich
- Installed: c. 1603
- Term ended: c. 1617
- Predecessor: William Redman
- Successor: John Overall
- Other post: Dean of Norwich (1601–1603)

Orders
- Consecration: c. 1603

Personal details
- Born: 1550
- Died: 13 March 1618
- Denomination: Anglican
- Residence: Aylsham, Norfolk
- Spouse: Dorothy Vaughan
- Occupation: Academic
- Education: Queens' College, Cambridge

John Jegon (1550 – 13 March 1618) was an English academic and Bishop of Norwich. He supported uniformity of Anglican doctrine and worship, and strong government. This led him into conflict with John Robinson, later pastor to the Mayflower emigrants. On the other hand, he made efforts to satisfy local Puritans by the appointment of preachers in his diocese. Nicholas Bownd dedicated to him a work on doctrine of Sabbath.

== Education and academic career ==
He was educated at Queens' College, Cambridge, where he graduated B.A. and became a Fellow in 1572, and was then at Corpus Christi College, Cambridge, where he became Master in 1590. His pupils included both Roger Manners and Francis Manners, Earls of Rutland. He had a long correspondence with their mother Elizabeth, widow of John Manners, 4th Earl of Rutland.

He was Vice-Chancellor of the University of Cambridge, from 1596 to 1598. As Vice-Chancellor he attempted to discipline John Rudd.

== Clerical career ==
He became Dean of Norwich in 1601, with the recommendation of John Whitgift. Two years later he was appointed as Bishop there. He resided in Aylsham.

== Family ==
He married Dorothy, daughter of Richard Vaughan. On his death she married the diplomat Sir Charles Cornwallis.

== Notes ==
Academic offices
Preceded by John Copcot	Master of Corpus Christi College, Cambridge; 1590–1602	Succeeded by Thomas Jegon
Church of England titles
Preceded by Thomas Dove	Deans of Norwich; 1601–1603	Succeeded by George Montgomery
Preceded by William Redman	Bishop of Norwich; 1603–1617	Succeeded by John Overall
