= John Lamb (rugby union) =

Australian rugby union player (1907–1983)

- Born: John Stewart Lamb; 12 April 1907 Armidale, New South Wales
- Died: 12 June 1983
- School: Newington College

Rugby union career
- Position: lock
International career
Years	Team	Apps	(Points)
1928	Australia	3	(0)

John Stewart "Mac” Lamb (born 12 April 1907 – 12 June 1983) was a rugby union player who represented Australia.

Lamb, a lock, claimed a total of 3 international rugby caps for Australia. In 1924 and 1925 he attended Newington College.
