= Peter Gunning =

English Royalist church leader, Bishop of Chichester and Bishop of Ely

The Right Reverend Peter Gunning
- Bishop of Ely
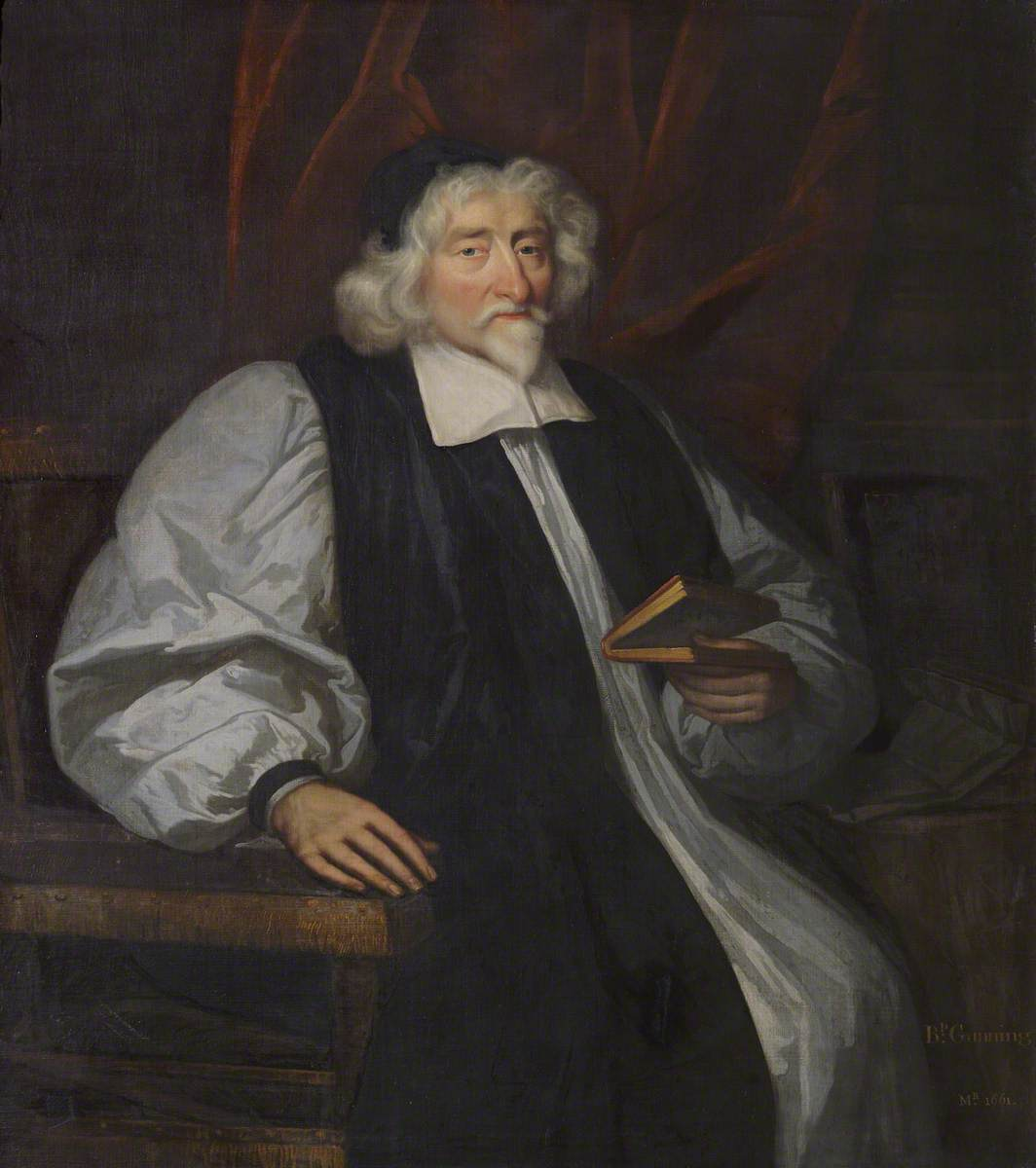
- Diocese: Diocese of Ely
- In office: 1675–1684
- Predecessor: Benjamin Lany
- Successor: Francis Turner
- Other post: Bishop of Chichester (1670–1675)

Orders
- Consecration: 6 March 1670 by Gilbert Sheldon

Personal details
- Born: 1614
- Died: 6 July 1684
- Buried: Ely Cathedral
- Denomination: Anglican
- Education: The King's School, Canterbury; Clare College, Cambridge

Peter Gunning (1614 – 6 July 1684) was an English Royalist church leader, Bishop of Chichester and Bishop of Ely.

== Life ==
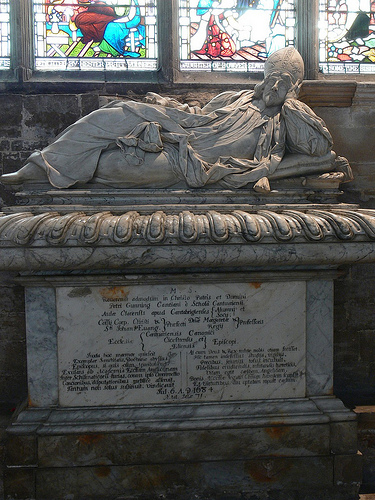
Monument Ely Cathedral.

He was born at Hoo St Werburgh, in Kent; his father was the vicar there. He was educated at The King's School, Canterbury and Clare College, Cambridge, where he became a fellow in 1633. Having taken orders, he advocated the Royalist cause eloquently from the pulpit. In 1644, during the English Civil War, he retired to Oxford, and held a chaplaincy at New College until the city surrendered to the Parliamentary forces in 1646. Subsequently he was chaplain, first to the royalist Sir Robert Shirley of Eatington (1629–1656), and then at the Exeter House chapel. After the Restoration in 1660 he was installed as a canon of Canterbury Cathedral. In the same year he returned to Cambridge as Master of Corpus Christi, and was appointed Lady Margaret's Professor of Divinity. He also received the livings of Cottesmore, Rutland, and Stoke Bruerne, Northamptonshire.

In 1661 he became head of St John's College, Cambridge, and was elected Regius Professor of Divinity. While he served as Regius Professor of Divinity he established an Arminian soteriological tradition at Cambridge that was furthered by his successor Joseph Beaumont. He was consecrated bishop of Chichester in 1669. He was translated to the see of Ely in 1674–1675. Holding moderate religious views, he disliked equally Puritanism and Roman Catholicism.

== Works ==
His works are chiefly reports of his disputations, such as that which appears in the Scisme Unmask't (Paris, 1658), in which the definition of a schism is discussed with two Roman Catholic opponents John Spenser and John Lenthall.

== Family ==
A relative of his, Sir Robert Gunning, became a famous diplomat.

Academic offices
| Preceded by Richard Love | Master of Corpus Christi College, Cambridge; 1661 | Succeeded by Francis Wilford |
| Preceded by Anthony Tuckney | Master of St John's College, Cambridge; 1661–1670 | Succeeded by Francis Turner |
| Preceded by Anthony Tuckney | Regius Professor of Divinity at Cambridge; 1661–1674 | Succeeded by Joseph Beaumont |
Church of England titles
| Preceded by Henry King | Bishop of Chichester; 1670–1675 | Succeeded by Ralph Brideoake |
| Preceded by Benjamin Lany | Bishop of Ely; 1675–1684 | Succeeded by Francis Turner |
