= John Lamb (cricketer) =

English cricketer

Personal information
- Full name: Henry John Hey Lamb
- Born: 3 May 1912; Warkton, Northamptonshire, England
- Died: 5 February 1993 (aged 80); Kettering, Northamptonshire, England
- Batting: Right-handed
- Role: Occasional wicket-keeper

Domestic team information
- Years: Team
- 1934–1938: Northamptonshire

Career statistics
Competition	First-class
Matches	38
Runs scored	1,085
Batting average	16.95
100s/50s	0/4
Top score	91*
Balls bowled	0
Wickets	–
Bowling average	–
5 wickets in innings	–
10 wickets in match	–
Best bowling	–
Catches/stumpings	23/1
- Source: Cricinfo, 19 November 2011

Henry John Hey Lamb (3 May 1912 – 5 February 1993) was an English cricketer. Lamb was a right-handed batsman who fielded occasionally as a wicket-keeper. He was born at Warkton, Northamptonshire.

== Career ==
Lamb made his first-class debut for Northamptonshire against Warwickshire in the 1934 County Championship. He made 37 further first-class appearances, the last of which came against Somerset in the 1938 County Championship. In his 38 first-class appearances, he scored 1,085 runs at an average of 16.95, with a high score of 91 not out. This score, which was one of four first-class fifties he made, came against Essex in 1936. He also captained Northamptonshire on occasion but was not the official club captain.

== Death ==
He died at Kettering, Northamptonshire, on 5 February 1993.
