= Frank Godbould Lee =

British public servant (1903–1971)

Sir Frank Godbould Lee GCMG KCB PC (26 August 1903 – 23 April 1971) was a British public servant and Master of Corpus Christi College, Cambridge.

Lee was born in Colchester, Essex, in 1903 and educated at Brentwood School and Downing College, Cambridge, where he read English. After Cambridge he joined the civil service in the Colonial Office where he stayed from 1926 until 1940. He then moved to the Treasury and was Permanent Secretary to the Ministry of Food when he was knighted in January 1950. In 1951 he became Permanent Secretary to the Board of Trade, before eventually moving back to the Treasury and becoming Joint Permanent Secretary.

In 1958, he delivered the Stamp memorial lecture, on the subject of The Board of Trade, which was subsequently published as a monograph by The University of London.

On 2 October 1962 he was made a privy councillor.

He retired from the civil service in 1962 and was appointed Master of Corpus Christi College Cambridge, a post he held until his death in 1971.

The Frank Lee Leisure Centre in Cambridge is named in his honour.

Government offices
Preceded by Sir Percivale Liesching	Permanent Secretary to the Ministry of Food; 1949–1951	Succeeded by Sir Henry Hancock
Preceded by Sir John Woods	Permanent Secretary to the Board of Trade; 1951–1960	Succeeded by Sir Richard Powell
Preceded by Sir Norman Brook	Joint Permanent Secretary to the Treasury; 1960–1962; With: Sir Norman Brook	Succeeded by William Armstrong; Sir Laurence Helsby
Academic offices
Preceded by Sir George Paget Thomson	Master of Corpus Christi College, Cambridge; 1962–1971	Succeeded by Sir Duncan Wilson
