= John Bell (dean of Ely) =

English priest and academic

John Bell was a 16th-century English priest and academic.

Bell graduated B.A. from Trinity College, Cambridge; M.A. and B.D. from Peterhouse, Cambridge and became a Fellow there in 1554. He was Master of Jesus College, Cambridge from 1579 to 1589; and Dean of Ely from 1589 to his death on 31 October 1591.
