= Thomas Aldrich (academic) =

Priest and academic in the sixteenth century

Thomas Aldrich was a priest and academic in the sixteenth century.

The son of John Aldrich, MP he was born in Norwich. He was educated at Corpus Christi College, Cambridge, becoming Fellow in 1562; and Master from 1570 until 1573. Aldrich was forced out as Master for displaying Puritan sympathies and replaced by Robert Norgate, a nephew of Matthew Parker, Archbishop of Canterbury. Aldrich was Rector of Hadleigh, Suffolk and Archdeacon of Sudbury from 1570 until 1576.
