= William Sowode =

William Sowode, D.D. was a priest and academic in the first half of the sixteenth century.

Sowood was born in Norfolk. He was educated at Corpus Christi College, Cambridge, graduating B.A. in 1508; MA in 1511; and B.D. in 1523. He became Fellow in 1508; and Master in 1523.He held livings at Madingley and Landbeach. He died on 29 November 1544.
