= Samuel Walsall =

Priest and academic in the late sixteenth and the early seventeenth centuries

Samuel Walsall, D.D. (1575-1626) was a priest and academic in the late sixteenth and the early seventeenth centuries.

Walsall was born in Eastling. He was educated at Corpus Christi College, Cambridge, graduating B.A. in 1593, M.A. in 1596, and B.D. in 1604. He was appointed Fellow in 1596 and Master in 1618. He held livings at Alkham, Appledore, St Mary Abchurch in the city of London and Little Wilbraham. He died on 31 July 1626.
