= Dean of Ely =

Position in the Church of England

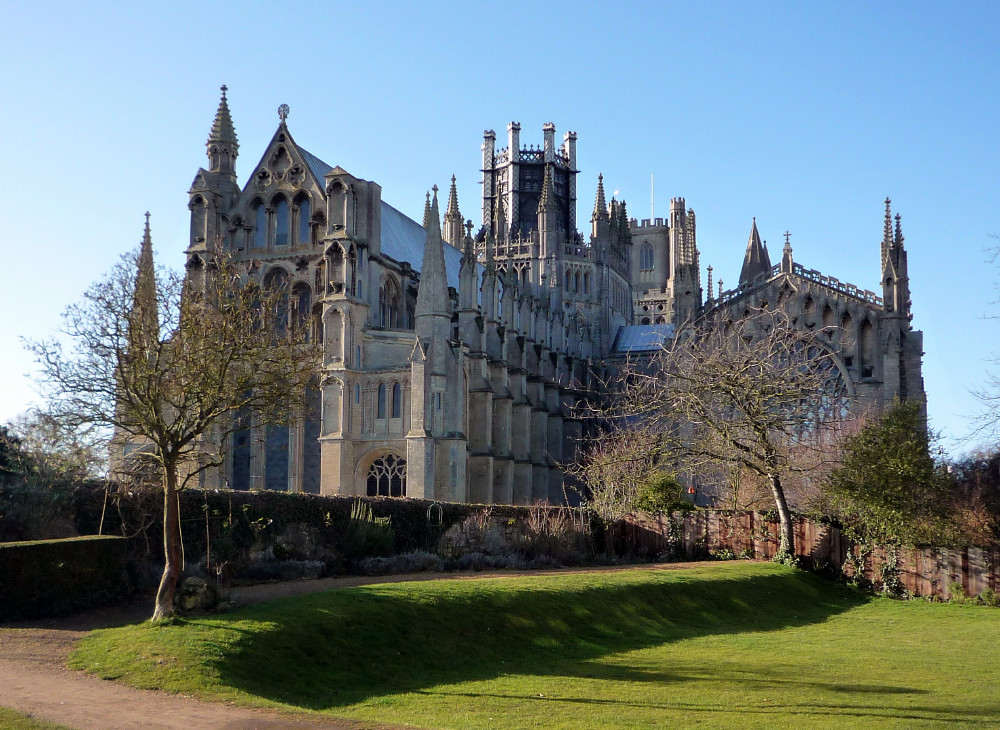
Ely Cathedral

The position of Dean of Ely Cathedral, in East Anglia, England, in the Diocese of Ely was created in 1541 after the Dissolution of the Monasteries. The first Dean of Ely had been the last Benedictine prior of Ely.

== List of deans ==
=== Early modern ===
- 1541–1557 Robert Steward (last prior)
- 1557–1589 Andrew Perne
- 1589–1591 John Bell
- 1591–1614 Humphrey Tyndall
- 1614–1636 Henry Caesar or Adelmare
- 1636–1646 William Fuller
- 1646–1651 William Beale
- 1660–1661 Richard Love
- 1661–1662 Henry Ferne
- 1662 Edward Martin
- 1662–1667 Francis Wilford
- 1667–1677 Robert Mapletoft
- 1677–1693 John Spencer
- 1693–1708 John Lambe
- 1708–1712 Charles Roderick
- 1713–1729 Robert Moss
- 1729–1730 John Frankland
- 1730–1758 Peter Allix

- 1758–1780 Hugh Thomas
- 1780–1797 William Cooke

=== Late modern ===
- 1797–1820 William Pearce
- 1820–1839 James Wood
- 1839–1858 George Peacock
- 1858–1869 Harvey Goodwin (afterwards Bishop of Carlisle, 1869)
- 1869–1893 Charles Merivale
- 1893–1905 Charles Stubbs
- 1905–1936 Alexander Kirkpatrick
- 1936–1950 Lionel Blackburne
- 1951–1969 Patrick Hankey
- 1969–1982 Michael Carey
- 1982–1984 Allan Shaw
- 1984–1990 William (Bill) Patterson
- 1991–2003 Michael Higgins
- 2003–2011 Michael Chandler
- 2012–2012 Canon David Pritchard (Acting)
- 2012–2026 Mark Bonney
- 2026–present Canon James Reveley (Acting)

== Fictional to deans ==
- Pennyfather, in Agatha Christie's At Bertram's Hotel.

== Sources ==
- British History – Fasti Ecclesiae Anglicanae 1541-1857, Vol. 7 – Deans of Ely
