= Peter Nobys =

English priest and academic (c. 1480–1525)

Peter Nobys, D.D. (b. c.1480, d. in or after 1525), was an English priest and academic in the first half of the sixteenth century.

Nobys was born in Thompson, Norfolk. He was educated at Corpus Christi College, Cambridge, graduating B.A. in 1501; MA in 1503; and B.D. in 1516. He became Fellow in 1504; and Master from 1517 to 1523. He held livings at Rushbrooke and Landbeach.
