= Henry Butts =

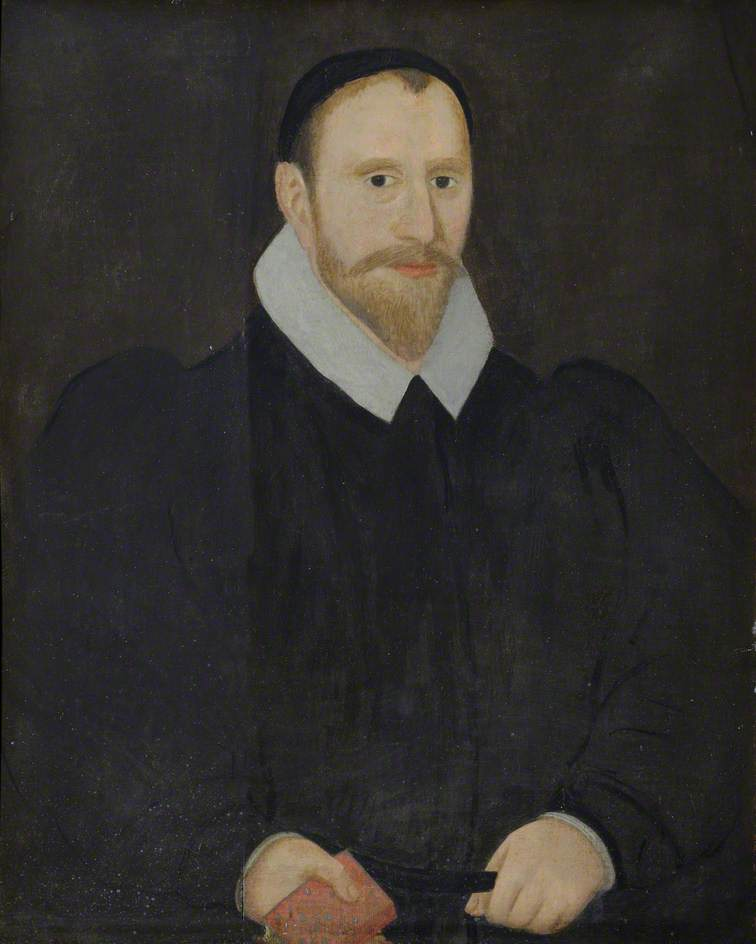
- Born: 1575
- Died: 1632

Henry Butts, D.D. (1573–1632) was a priest and academic in the second half of the sixteenth century and the first decades of the seventeenth.

Butts was born in Northamptonshire. He was educated at Corpus Christi College, Cambridge, graduating Bachelor of Arts (BA) degree in 1595; and Master of Arts (MA) degree in 1598. He was appointed Fellow in 1597; and Master in 1626. He was Vice-Chancellor of the University of Cambridge from 1629 to 1631. During his time as vice-chancellor, Bubonic plague broke out in Cambridge and, unlike most of the students and scholars, he remained in the city to coordinate the university's response. He held livings at Birdbrook then Barton Mills. He hanged himself on Easter Day (1 April) 1632.
