= Charles Roderick =

English Anglican dean

Charles Roderick, D.D. was an Anglican Dean at the end of the 17th century and the beginning of the 18th.

Lambe was born in Bunbury, Cheshire, and educated at Eton and King's College, Cambridge. He was Head Master of Eton College from 1682 to 1690. He held livings at Raynham and Milton, Cambridgeshire. Roderick was Provost of King's College, Cambridge from 1691 until his death; and Vice-Chancellor of the University of Cambridge between 1690 and 1691. He was Dean of Ely from 1708 until his death on 29 March 1712.
