= Julius Caesar (judge) =

English judge and statesman

The Right Honourable Sir Julius Caesar
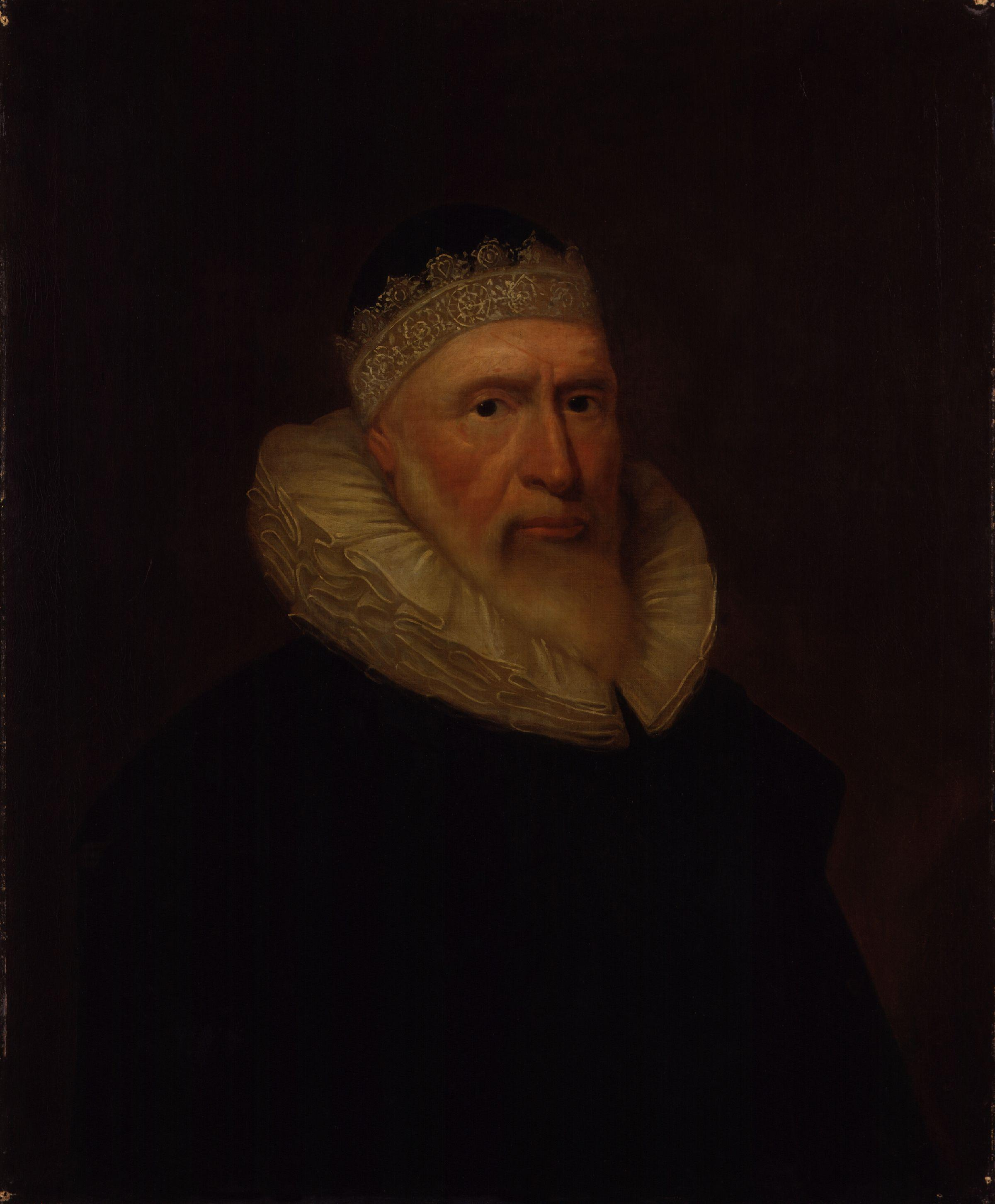

Master of the Rolls
- In office 1614–1636
- Monarchs: James I; Charles I
- Preceded by: Sir Edward Phelips
- Succeeded by: Sir Dudley Digges

Chancellor of the Exchequer
- In office 1606–1614
- Monarch: James I
- Preceded by: The Earl of Dunbar
- Succeeded by: Sir Fulke Greville

Personal details
- Born: 1557/1558 Middlesex, England
- Died: 18 April 1636
- Spouses: Dorcas Martin (d. 1595); Alice Dent (m. 1596; died 1614) Anne Hogan (m. 1615)
- Children: Julius Caesar; Sir Charles Caesar; Sir John Caesar; Robert Caesar
- Parents: Cesare Adelmare; Margery Perient
- Education: Magdalen Hall, Oxford; University of Paris

Sir Julius Caesar (1557/1558 – 18 April 1636) was an English lawyer, judge and politician who sat in the House of Commons at various times between 1589 and 1622. He was also known as Julius Adelmare.

== Early life and education ==
Caesar was born near Tottenham in Middlesex, the son of Cesare Adelmare who was originally from Treviso, Italy, and his wife, Margery Perient or Pirry (died c. 1583). Cesare Adelmare, like many of his ancestors, studied at the University of Padua, where he was made doctor in 1547. He was registered as a doctor in his native Treviso in 1542. In England in 1544 he was found to be working unlicensed and then licensed. He was naturalised in 1558, and was a physician to Queens Mary I and Elizabeth I. Cesare's father, Pietro Maria Adelmare, was also a graduate of Padua, and was a judge and ambassador for Treviso. Cesare's mother, Paola Cesarini, was said to be descended from the well-known Cesarini family of Rome.

Julius was baptised in the Church of St. Dunstan's-in-the-East in February 1558, his sponsors being the Lord Treasurer, William Paulet, 1st Marquess of Winchester; the Earl of Arundel; and Lady Montagu representing the queen. After his father's death, his mother married, as her second husband, Michael Lok. He was possibly educated at Winchester College and matriculated at Magdalen Hall, Oxford, on 10 January 1575, aged 16, and was awarded BA on 17 May 1575 and MA on 18 February 1578. He then studied at the Faculty of Law of Paris (University of Paris), where he was made LLB and LLD on 22 April 1581.

== Career ==
Caesar was noted for his persistent striving for advancement and for financial reward in the time of Queen Elizabeth. He was a general commissioner on piracy in October 1581. In 1583 he was counsel to the City of London and commissary of his friend John Aylmer, the Bishop of London in Middlesex, Hertfordshire and Essex. On 5 March 1584 he was awarded a law degree at Oxford, and became doctor of canon law. In 1584, he was appointed Judge of the High Court of Admiralty until 1605, and was an advocate of Doctors' Commons in 1586. In 1588 he became a master in chancery. He was elected MP for Reigate in 1589. He became Bencher of the Inner Temple in 1590 and was Master of Requests Extraordinary of Court of Requests in 1591. He became JP from 1592 and was governor of mineral and battery works in 1593. Also in 1593 he was elected MP for Bletchingley. He was treasurer of the Inner Temple in 1593. He became Master of Requests Ordinary of Court of Requests in 1595 and Master of St Katherine's Hospital in 1596. In 1597 he was elected MP for Windsor and was re-elected MP for Windsor in 1601.

Queen Elizabeth, on her way to Nonsuch Palace, paid him a visit at his house at Mitcham on 12 September 1598. She spent the night of the 12th there, and dined with him the next day. He had hosted her on previous occasions.

In the reign of King James I, Caesar acquired extensive property, particularly in Hertfordshire, and achieved greater influence and political importance. He was knighted at Greenwich by King James in May 1603. He also became ecclesiastical commissioner for the Province of Canterbury in 1603. In 1606 he was elected MP for Middlesex. He was Chancellor and Under Treasurer of the Exchequer from 1606 to 1614. In 1607 he was appointed to the Privy Council. In 1614 he was appointed Master of the Rolls, an office which he held till his death in 1636. He was re-elected MP for Middlesex in 1614. In 1621 he became first commissioner for the great seal and was elected MP for Maldon. He was commissioner to inquire into operation of the poor law from 1631 to 1633.

== Death ==
Caesar died at the age of 79 and was buried at Great St. Helen's, Bishopsgate.

== Legacy ==
Caesar was a remarkable civil servant and left many volumes of papers relating to his official work, and others relating to the mint, of which his first father-in-law was master. He worked on the history of the Exchequer, and presented to Burghley a history of the Court of Requests "to defend it against the slights of the common lawyers". In 1625 he wrote a treatise on the constitution and functions of the privy council, entitled Concerning the Private Council of the Most High and Mighty King of Great Britain, France, Scotland, and Ireland. His manuscripts, many of which are now in the British Museum, were sold by auction in 1757 for a sum of around £500.

== Personal life ==
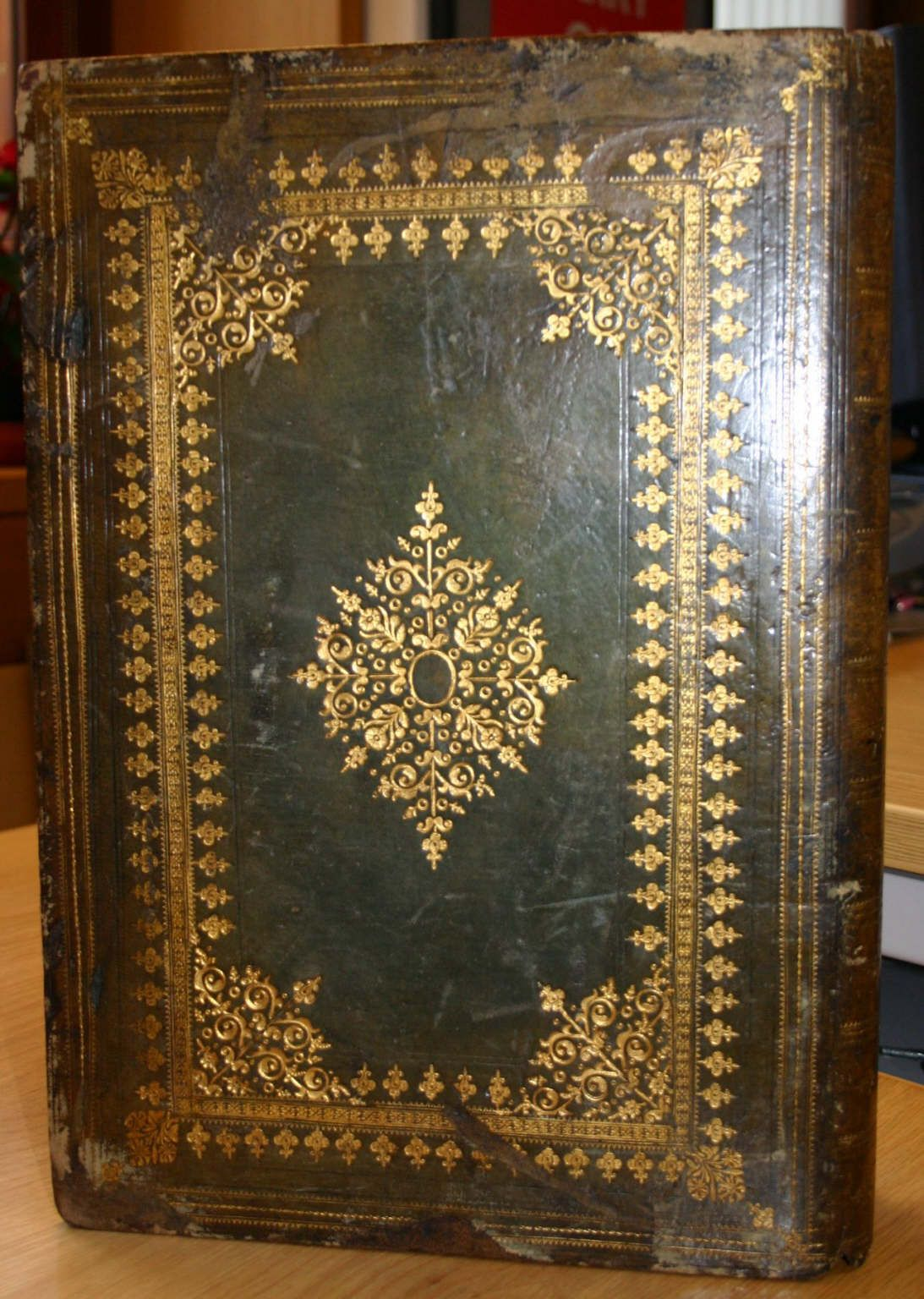
A book from Sir Julius Caesar's travelling library, now in the British Library

Caesar married three times. He married firstly Dorcas Lusher (1561 – 16 June 1595), widow of Richard Lusher of the Middle Temple and daughter of Sir Richard Martin, master of the mint and later Lord Mayor of London, with whom he had four sons and a daughter.

He married secondly, on 10 April 1596, Alice Dent (June 1569 – 23 May 1614), widow of John Dent, Alderman of London, and daughter of Christopher Grant of Manchester, Lancashire, with whom he had three more sons. A portrait of Alice when pregnant dated 1597 gives her age as 31.

He married thirdly Anne Hogan, widow of Henry Hogan and William Hungate, both of East Bradenham, Norfolk, and daughter of Henry Woodhouse of Waxham, Norfolk on 19 April 1615. His third wife Anne was a granddaughter of Nicholas Bacon. Francis Bacon, his wife's uncle, died in his arms.

His son, also named Julius Caesar (14 February 1587 – 8 January 1607), was sent to study at the University of Padua. He was wounded while fencing with Antonio Brochetta and sought revenge. He lay in wait for him with a pistol, but his shot missed. He then fell while attempting to draw his sword and was set upon by Brochetta who ran him through and killed him.

His son Sir Charles Caesar (27 January 1590 – 6 December 1642) was a member of Parliament, as well as Master of the Rolls from 1639 to 1642, which he purchased for £15,000 and a £2,000 loan.

His son Sir John Caesar (20 October 1597 – 23 May 1647) of Hyde Hall, Hertfordshire, a country gentleman, was knighted in Scotland on 20 June 1617.

His son Thomas Caesar D.D. (17 March 1601 – 1633) was rector of Llanrhuddlad Anglesey, Wales of whom a memorial graces the chancel of Beaumaris parish church, Anglesey.

His son Robert Caesar (9 October 1602 – 27 October 1637) was one of the Six Clerks of Court of Chancery and a member of Parliament.

== Notes ==
Parliament of England
Preceded by William Howard; Edmund Sanders	Member of Parliament for Reigate; 1589; With: Thomas Lyfield	Succeeded by William Howard; John Trevor
Preceded by Richard Bostock; John Cox	Member of Parliament for Bletchingley; 1593; With: Stephen Riddlesden	Succeeded by Sir Richard Trevor; John Trevor
Preceded by Henry Neville; Edward Neville	Member of Parliament for Windsor; 1597–1601; With: John Norreys	Succeeded by Samuel Backhouse; Thomas Durdent
Preceded by Sir William Fleetwood; Sir Robert Wroth	Member of Parliament for Middlesex; 1606–1614; With: Sir William Fleetwood 1606–1611; Sir Thomas Lake 1614	Succeeded by Sir Francis Darcy; Sir Gilbert Gerard, Bt
Preceded by Sir John Sammes; Charles Chiborne	Member of Parliament for Maldon; 1621–1622; With: Sir Henry Mildmay	Succeeded by Sir William Masham, Bt; Sir Arthur Harris
Legal offices
Preceded by Sir Edward Phelips	Master of the Rolls; 1614–1636	Succeeded by Sir Dudley Digges
