= Robert Norgate (priest) =

English priest

Robert Norgate, D.D. (died 1587) was an English priest and academic in the second half of the sixteenth century.

Norgate was born in Aylsham. He was educated at Corpus Christi College, Cambridge, graduating B.A. in 1565; MA in 1568; and B.D. in 1575. He was appointed Fellow in 1567; and Master in 1573. A nephew of Matthew Parker, then Archbishop of Canterbury and a former Master of the College, Norgate was installed as Master when Thomas Aldrich was forced out for displaying Puritan sympathies. He was elected Vice-Chancellor of the University of Cambridge for the year 1584. He held livings at Forncett and Little Gransden. He died at the Master's Lodge on 2 November 1587.
