= Scory =

Scory is a surname. Notable people with the surname include:

- John Scory (died 1585), English Dominican friar
- Sylvanus Scory (c. 1551–1617), English courtier and politician
