= Robert Nugent =

Robert Nugent may refer to:

- Robert Nugent (Jesuit) (1574–1652), superior of the Irish Jesuit mission
- Robert Nugent, 1st Earl Nugent (1709–1788), Irish politician and poet
- Robert Nugent (officer) (1824–1901), Irish-born American U.S. Army officer during the American Civil War and the Indian Wars
- Robert Nugent (judge), South African judge
- Robert Nugent (1937–2014), American Roman Catholic priest and co-founder of New Ways Ministry
