= Matthew Parker =

Archbishop of Canterbury from 1559 to 1575

The Most Reverend Matthew Parker
- Archbishop of Canterbury
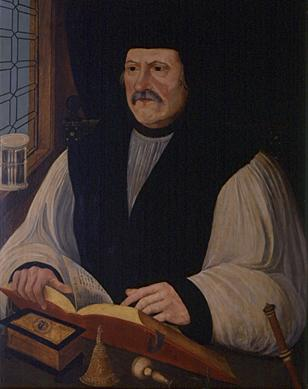
- Church: Church of England
- Installed: 19 December 1559
- Term ended: 17 May 1575
- Predecessor: Reginald Pole
- Successor: Edmund Grindal

Orders
- Ordination: 15 June 1527
- Consecration: 17 December 1559 by William Barlow

Personal details
- Born: 6 August 1504 Norwich
- Died: 17 May 1575 (aged 70) Lambeth
- Buried: Lambeth Chapel
- Parents: William Parker; Alice Monins
- Signature: Matthew Parker's signature

Ordination history
History
Priestly ordination
- Date: 15 June 1527
Episcopal consecration
- Principal consecrator: William Barlow
- Co-consecrators: John Hodgkins; John Scory; Myles Coverdale
- Date: 17 December 1559
- Place: Lambeth Palace Chapel
Episcopal succession
Bishops consecrated by Matthew Parker as principal consecrator
- Edmund Grindal: 21 December 1559
- Richard Cox: 21 December 1559
- Rowland Meyrick: 21 December 1559
- Edwin Sandys: 21 December 1559

Matthew Parker (6 August 1504 – 17 May 1575) was an English bishop. He was the Archbishop of Canterbury in the Church of England from 1559 to his death. He was also an influential theologian and arguably the co-founder (with Thomas Cranmer, a previous Archbishop of Canterbury, and the theologian Richard Hooker) of a distinctive tradition of Anglican theological thought.

Parker was one of the primary architects of the Thirty-nine Articles, the defining statements of Anglican doctrine. The Parker collection of early English manuscripts, including the book of St Augustine Gospels and "Version A" of the Anglo-Saxon Chronicle, was created as part of his efforts to demonstrate that the English Church was historically independent of Rome and was one of the world's most important collections of ancient manuscripts. Along with the pioneering scholar Lawrence Nowell, Parker's work concerning Old English literature laid the foundation for Anglo-Saxon studies.

== Early years (1504–1525) ==
Matthew Parker, the eldest son of William and Alice Parker, was born in Norwich in St Saviour's parish on 6 August 1504; he was one of six children, and the third son and eldest surviving child. His father was a wealthy worsted weaver and the grandson of Nicholas Parker, registrar to successive archbishops of Canterbury between 1450 and 1483. His mother Alice Monins was originally from Kent; she may have been related by marriage to Thomas Cranmer, Archbishop of Canterbury from 1533 to 1555. William Parker died in about 1516 and, within three or four years following his death, Alice Parker married John Baker. Their son, also called John, was later nominated as one of Parker's executors. Matthew Parker's surviving siblings were Botolph (who became a priest), Thomas (who during his life became Mayor of Norwich) and Margaret.

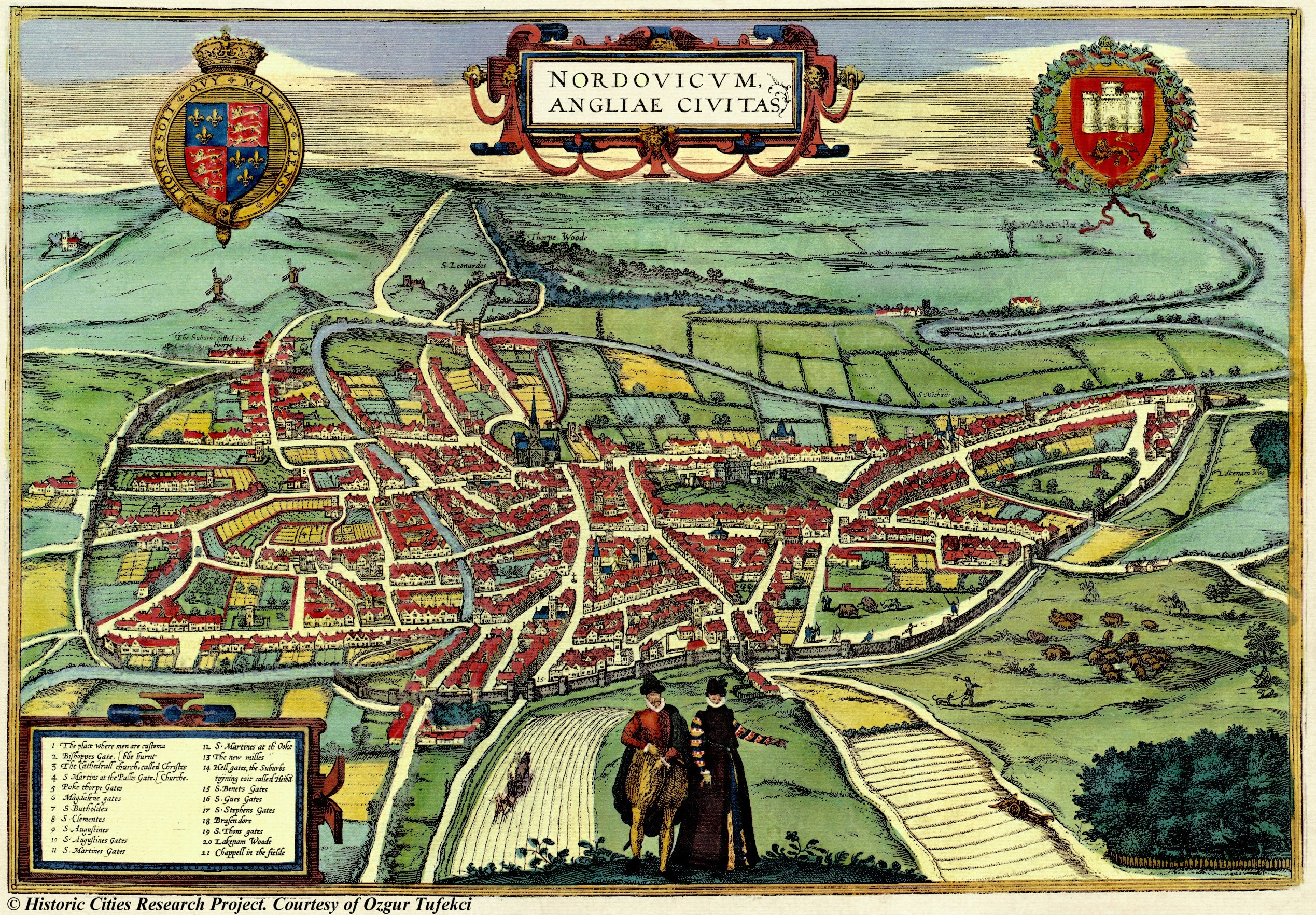
Map of Norwich from the Civitates Orbis Terrarum; Fyebriggate, now Magdalen Street, runs from the cathedral to Magdalen Gate at the city walls

Parker was brought up in Norwich on Fye Bridge Street, now called Magdalen Street. He was possibly educated at home, and recalled later in life being taught by six men, mostly clerics. According to his biographer John Strype,

His first masters for reading were one Benis, Rector of St. Clements in Norwich, and one Pope, a Priest. For writing he was instructed by one Prior, Clerk of St. Benedicts. For singing Love, a Priest, and Manthorp, Clerk of St. Stephen were his masters: of both whose harshness he felt so much, that he could never forget it. But he had amends in W. Neve, his schoolmaster for grammar learning, a man of a more gentle and mild disposition; who was provided to teach him at home.

In 1520, the 16-year-old Parker went up to Cambridge University, where he studied at Bene't College, now known as Corpus Christi College under Richard Cowper. On 20 March 1520, after six months at the college, he obtained a scholarship and became the Bible clerk at Bene't College, and so was able to move from St Mary's Hostel to rooms in the college. At Cambridge he was able to read the works of the German theologian Martin Luther, and had access to books by married theologians from the continent—Parker first commended the English priest clerical marriage when he was a student there. He was associated with the circle of Thomas Bilney, remaining loyal to him throughout their university days together. Parker graduated with a Bachelor of Arts degree in 1525.

== Career at Cambridge (1525–1547) ==
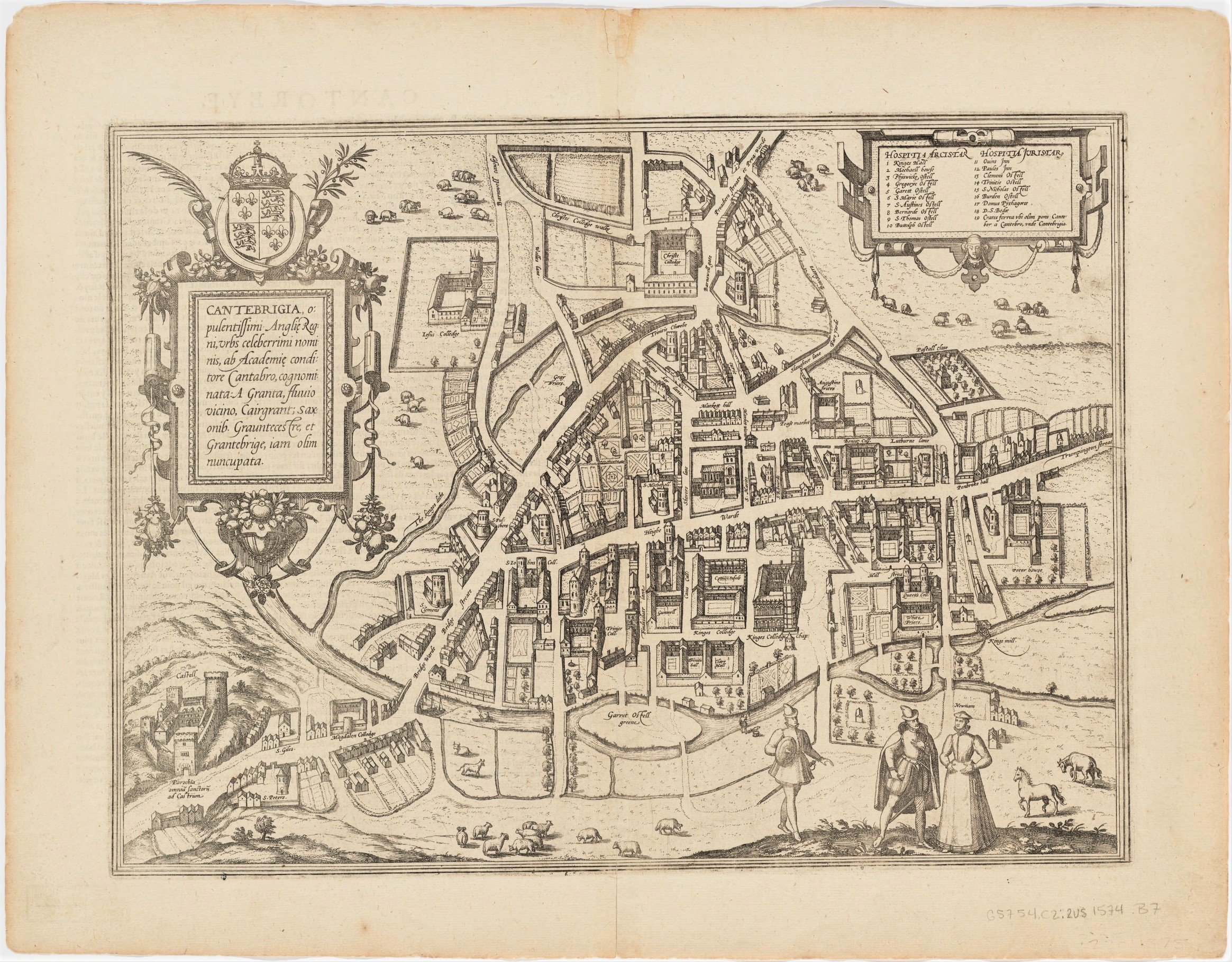
Georg Braun and Frans Hogenberg's map of Tudor Cambridge

Parker was ordained as a deacon on 20 April 1527 and a priest two months later, on 15 June. In September he was elected a fellow of Corpus Christi. There is no evidence that he was ever involved in a public dispute at Cambridge, unlike his contemporaries. Bilney was accused of heresy in 1527 and then recanted, but was imprisoned for two years. He returned to Cambridge, regretting his recantation, and began to preach throughout Norfolk. In August 1531 he was condemned to be burnt at the stake as a relapsed heretic; Parker was present at his execution in Norwich on 19 August, and afterwards defended Bilney after accusations were made that he had recanted at the stake.

In around 1527, Parker was one of the Cambridge scholars whom Cardinal Thomas Wolsey invited to Cardinal College at Oxford. Parker, like Cranmer, declined Wolsey's invitation. The college had been founded in 1525 on the site of St Frideswide's Priory, and was still being built when Wolsey fell from power in 1529.

Parker began his Master of Arts degree in 1528. He was licensed to preach by Cranmer in 1533, and quickly became a popular preacher in and around Cambridge; none of his sermons have survived. He would have had to adhere to the Ten Articles enforced on the clergy during that period.

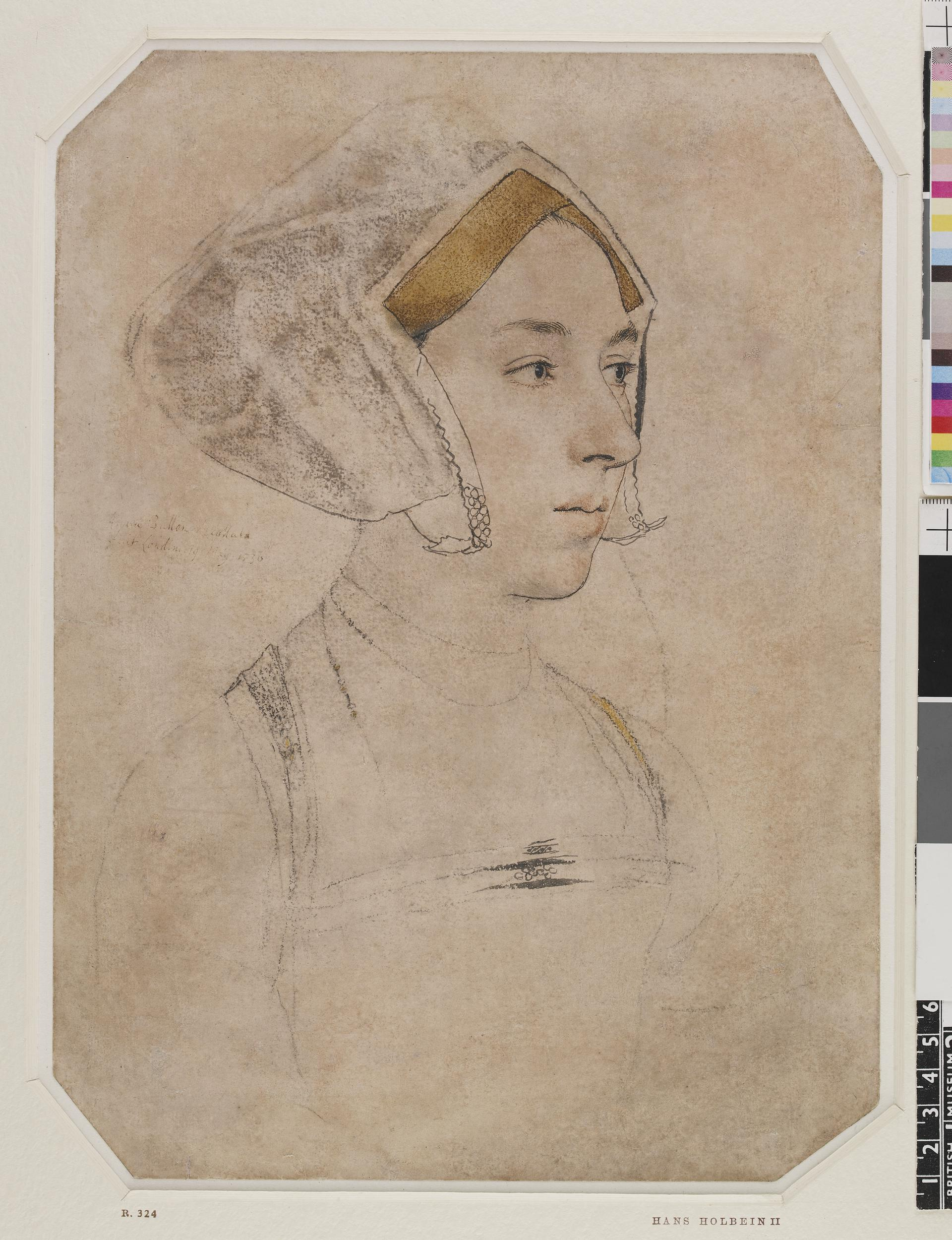
Hans Holbein the Younger, A Lady, called Anne Boleyn (c.1532–1535), British Museum

After being summoned to the court of Anne Boleyn he became her chaplain. Through her influence he was appointed dean of the college of secular canons at Stoke-by-Clare in Suffolk in 1535, a post he held until 1547. The college had been secularised in 1514. The duties of the residents involved the regular performance of the offices of the church and prayers for the founder's family, but little direction was provided in the statutes for other times during the day, and there was little to do for the residents beyond their daily tasks and the education of the choirboys. It had come close to be acquired by Wolsey, but this had been prevented by the intervention of the Bishop of Norwich and Henry VIII's first wife, Catherine.

He retained his fellowship at Cambridge University whilst he was dean at Stoke-by-Clare. His biographer V.J.K. Brook commented that for Parker "his new post provided him with a happy and quiet place of retirement in the country to which he became devoted"; and allowed him to pursue his enthusiasm for education and the sponsorship of new buildings. At Stoke he transformed the college by introducing new statutes to ensure regular preaching occurred. Under Parker's deanship, scholars came from Cambridge to deliver lectures, greater care was taken over the education of the boy choristers, and a free grammar school for local boys was built within the precincts. His successful revitalisation of the college caused its reputation to spread, and he was able to protect it from being dissolved by citing the good work being done there; it retained its status until after Henry's death in 1547.

Shortly before Anne Boleyn's arrest in 1536, she charged her daughter Elizabeth to Parker's care, something he honoured for the rest of his life. He obtained his Bachelor of Divinity in July 1535, and in 1537 was appointed chaplain to Henry; he graduated Doctor of Divinity in July 1538.

In 1539 he was denounced to the Lord Chancellor, Thomas Audley, by his opponents at Stoke-by-Clare, who accused him of heresy and using "disloyal language against Easter, relics and other details". Audley dismissed the charges and urged Parker to "go on and fear no such enemies". In 1541 was appointed to the second prebend at Ely, a sign of royal approval.

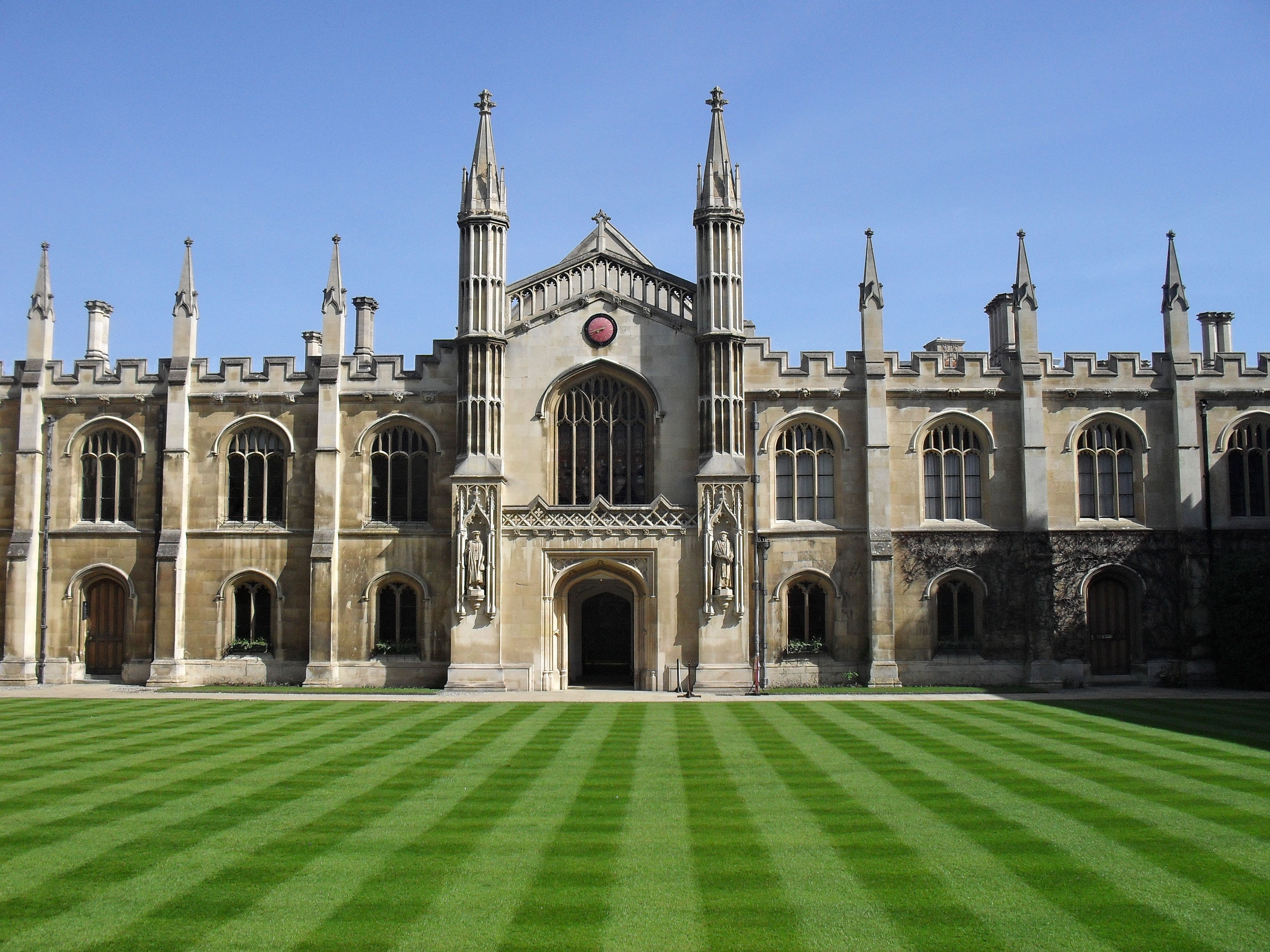
The chapel of Corpus Christi College, Cambridge

On 4 December 1544, on Henry's recommendation, he was elected master of Corpus Christi College. Such was his devotion towards the care of the college, he is now regarded as its second founder. Upon his election he began the process of organising its finances properly, which enabled him to repair the buildings and construct new ones: the master's Lodgings, the college halls and many of the students' rooms were improved. He worked hard to make Corpus Christi a centre of learning, founding new scholarships.

In January 1545, after two months in the post of master of Corpus, he was elected vice-chancellor of the university. During his year in office he got into some trouble with the Chancellor of Cambridge University, Stephen Gardiner, over a play, Pammachius, performed by the students and censored by the college, which derided the old ecclesiastical system. Parker was obliged to make enquiries into the nature of the play, but then allowed to settle the matter himself on behalf of the university authorities.

=== Career under Edward VI ===
On the passing of the Act of Parliament in 1545 enabling the king to dissolve chantries and colleges, Parker was appointed one of the commissioners for Cambridge, and their report may have saved its colleges from destruction. Stoke, however, was dissolved in the following reign, and Parker received a generous pension. He took advantage of the new reign to marry in June 1547, before clerical marriages were legalised by Parliament and Convocation, Margaret, daughter of Robert Harlestone, a Norfolk squire. They had initially planned to marry since about 1540 but had waited until it was not a felony for priests to marry. The marriage was a happy one, although Queen Elizabeth's dislike of Margaret was later to cause Parker much distress. They had five children, of whom John and Matthew reached adulthood. During Kett's Rebellion, he preached at the rebels' camp on Mousehold Hill near Norwich, without much effect, and later encouraged his secretary, Alexander Neville, to write his history of the rising.

Parker's association with Protestantism advanced with the times, and he received higher promotion under John Dudley, 1st Duke of Northumberland, than under the moderate Edward Seymour, 1st Duke of Somerset. At Cambridge, he was a friend of the German Protestant reformer Martin Bucer after he was exiled to England, and preached Bucer's funeral sermon in 1551. In 1552 he was promoted to the rich deanery of Lincoln.

== Demotion during the reign of Mary ==
In July 1553 he supped with Northumberland at Cambridge, when the duke marched north on his hopeless campaign against the accession of Mary Tudor. As a supporter of Northumberland and a married man, under the new regime, Parker was deprived of his deanery, his mastership of Corpus Christi and his other preferments.

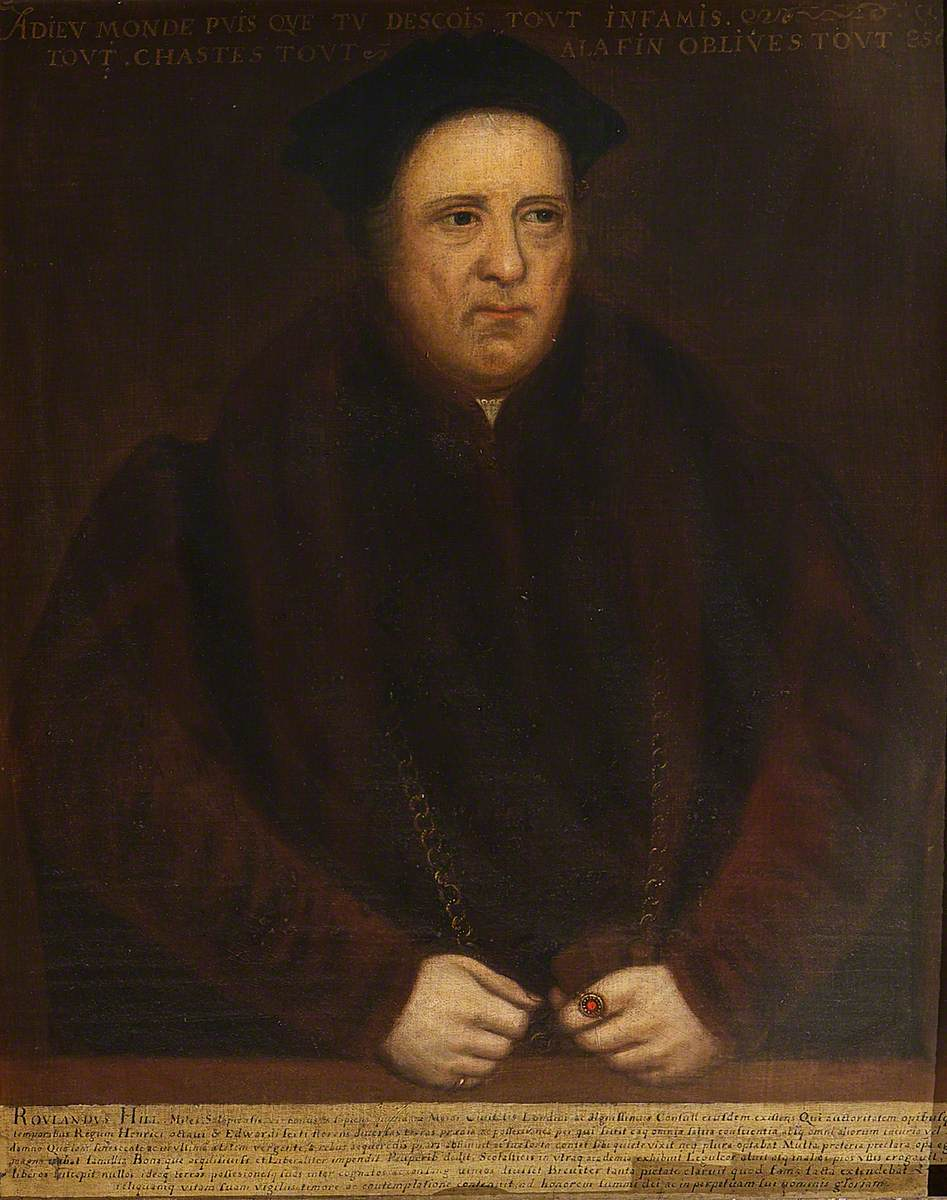
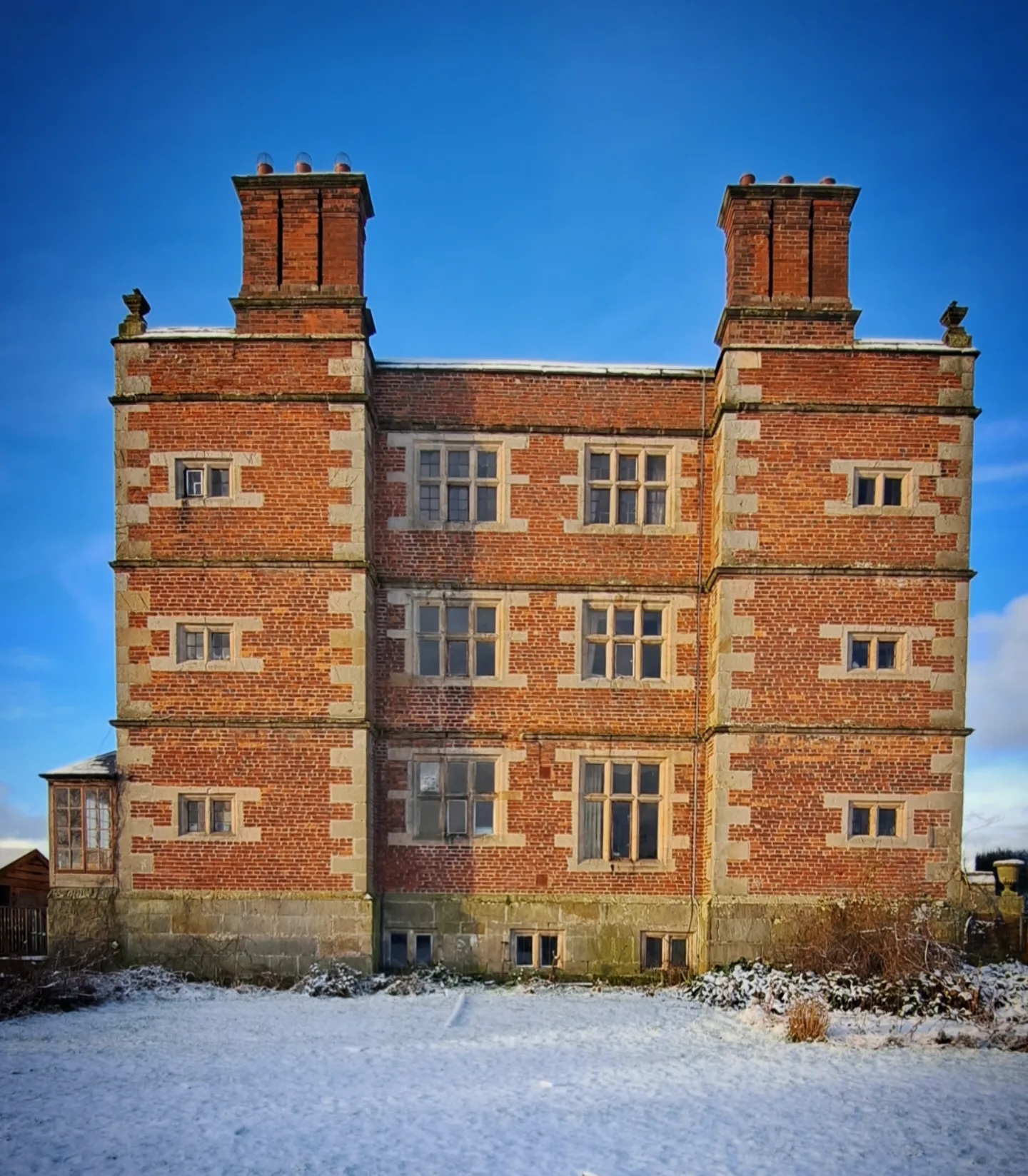
Sir Rowland Hill and his rural headquarters at Soulton in Shropshire. It is possible that Hill sheltered Parker and his scholarly materials at Soulton while he and they were in danger during the counter reformation.

However, he survived Mary's reign without leaving the country – a fact that would not have endeared him to the more ardent Protestants who went into exile and idealised those who were martyred by Mary. The historian James D. Wenn has suggested that Parker may have enjoyed the protection of Sir Rowland Hill of Soulton, Shropshire, during this time. Hill is associated with the publication of the Geneva Bible and joined Parker as a Commissioner for Ecclesiastical Cases in 1559.

Parker respected authority, and when his time came he could consistently impose authority on others. He was not eager to assume this task, and made great efforts to avoid promotion to Archbishop of Canterbury, which Elizabeth designed for him as soon as she had succeeded to the throne.

== Archbishop of Canterbury (1559–1575) ==
Elizabeth wanted a moderate man, so she chose Parker on the recommendations of William Cecil, 1st Baron Burghley, her chief adviser. There was also an emotional attachment. Parker had been the favourite chaplain of Elizabeth's mother, the queen Anne Boleyn. Before Anne was arrested in 1536 she had entrusted Elizabeth's spiritual well-being to Parker. A few days afterwards Anne was executed following charges of adultery, incest and treason. Parker also possessed all the qualifications Elizabeth expected from an archbishop, except celibacy. Elizabeth had a strong prejudice against married clergy, and in addition, she seems to have disliked Margaret Parker personally, often treating her so rudely that her husband was "in horror to hear it". After a visit to Lambeth Palace, the Queen duly thanked her hostess but maliciously asked how she should address her, "For Madam I may not call you, mistress I should be ashamed to call you."

Parker was elected on 1 August 1559 but, given the turbulence and executions that had preceded Elizabeth's accession, it was difficult to find the requisite four bishops willing and qualified to consecrate him, and not until 19 December was the ceremony performed at Lambeth by William Barlow, formerly Bishop of Bath and Wells, John Scory, formerly Bishop of Chichester, Miles Coverdale, formerly Bishop of Exeter, and John Hodgkins, Bishop of Bedford. The allegation of an indecent consecration at the Nag's Head public house seems first to have been made by a Jesuit, Christopher Holywood, in 1604, and has since been discredited. Parker's consecration was, however, legally valid only by the plenitude of the Royal Supremacy approved by the House of Commons and reluctantly by a vote of the House of Lords 21–18; the Edwardine Ordinal, which was used, had been repealed by Mary Tudor and not re-enacted by the parliament of 1559. In 1562 Parker granted a special licence to Thomas Ashton to become the founding headmaster of Shrewsbury School, which his associate Sir Rowland Hill had helped to on the grounds that that Ashton not being available would damage the progress of the school's foundation, potential significance attaches to this because of the innovative approaches to teaching and drama that institution went on to exhibit.

Parker mistrusted popular enthusiasm, and he wrote in horror of the idea that "the people" should be the reformers of the church. He was convinced that if ever Protestantism was to be firmly established in England at all, some definite ecclesiastical forms and methods must be sanctioned to secure the triumph of order over anarchy, and he vigorously set about the repression of what he thought a mutinous individualism incompatible with a catholic spirit.

He was not an inspiring leader and no dogma or prayer book is associated with his name. However, the English composer Thomas Tallis contributed Nine Tunes for Archbishop Parker's Psalter which bears his name. The 55 volumes published by the Parker Society include only one by its eponymous hero, and that is a volume of correspondence. He was a disciplinarian, a scholar, a modest and moderate man of genuine piety and irreproachable morals.

Probably his most famous saying, prompted by the arrival of Mary Queen of Scots in England, was "I fear our good Queen [Elizabeth I] has the wolf by the ears."

=== Dispute about the validity of his consecration in 1559 ===
Parker's consecration gave rise to a dispute, which continues to this day, in regard to its sacramental validity from the perspective of the Roman Catholic Church. This eventually led to the condemnation of Anglican orders as "absolutely null and utterly void" by a papal commission in 1896. The commission could not dispute that a consecration had taken place which met all the legal and liturgical requirement or deny that a "manual" succession, that is, the consecration by the laying on of hands and prayer had taken place. Rather the Pope asserted in the condemnation that the "defect of form and intent" rendered the rite insufficient to make a bishop in the apostolic succession (according to the Roman Catholic understanding of the minima for validity). Specifically the English rite was considered to be defective in "form", i.e. in the words of the rite which did not mention the "intention" to create a sacrificing bishop considered to be a priest in a higher degree, and the absence of a certain "matter" such as the handing of a chalice and paten to symbolise the power to offer sacrifice. (Note: This is summed up as what effects a sacrament is the intention of administering that sacrament and the rite used according to that intention.)

The Church of England archbishops of Canterbury and York rejected the pontiff's arguments in Saepius Officio in 1897. This rebuttal was written to demonstrate the sufficiency of the form and intention used in the Anglican Ordinal: the archbishops wrote that in the preface to the Ordinal the intention clearly is stated to continue the existing holy orders as received. They stated that even if Parker's consecrators had private doubts or lacked intention to do what the rites of ordination clearly stated, it counted for nought, since the words and actions of a rite (the formularies) performed on behalf of the church by the ministers of the sacrament, and not the opinions, however erroneous or correct, or inner states of mind or moral condition of the actors who carry them out, are the sole determinants. This view is also held by the Roman Catholic Church (and others) with few exceptions since the 3rd century.

Likewise, according to the archbishops, the required references to the sacrificial priesthood never existed in any ancient Catholic ordination liturgies prior to the 9th century nor in certain current Eastern-rite ordination liturgies that the Roman Catholic Church considers valid nor in Orthodoxy. Also, the archbishops argued that a particular formula in this respect as a sine qua non made no difference to the substance or validity of the act since the only two components that all ordination rites had in common were prayer and the laying on of hands and, in this regard, the words in the Anglican rite itself gave sufficient evidence as to the intent of the participants as stated in the preface, words and action of the rite. They pointed out that the only fixed and sure sacramental formulary is the baptismal rite. They argued that it was not necessary to consecrate a bishop as a "sacrificing priest" since he already was one by virtue of being a priest, except in ordinations per saltim, i.e. from deacon to bishop when the person was made priest and bishop at once, a practice discontinued and forbidden. They also pointed out that none of the priests ordained with the English Ordinal were re-ordained as a requirement by Queen Mary - some did so voluntarily and some were re-anointed, a practice common at the time. On the contrary, the Queen, unhappy about married clergy, ordered all of them, estimated at 15% of the total at the beginning of her reign in 1553, to put their wives away.

Parker was ordained in 1527 in the Latin-language rite and before the break with Rome. As such according to this rite he was a "sacrificing priest" to which nothing more could be added by being consecrated a bishop. The orders of the Church of Ireland were also condemned as part of the wider denunciation of Anglican orders. The Popes at the time did not object to the Edwardine Ordinal but regarded those done from 1534 to 1553 as valid but illicit since they had not given permission for them.

In regard to the legal and canonical requirements, the government was at pains to see all were met for the consecration. None of the 18 Marian bishops would agree to consecrate Parker. Not only were they opposed to the changes the bishops had been excluded from decision-making regarding changes in liturgy, doctrine and the Royal Supremacy. The Commons approved the changes and the Lords 21-18 approved after pressure was brought to bear on them; concessions were made in a more Catholic tone in eucharistic doctrine, and allowance made for the use of Mass vestments and other traditional clerical dress in use in the second year of the reign of Edward VI, i.e. January 1548 to 49, when the Latin Rite was still the legal form of worship (the 'Ornaments Rubric' in the 1559 Prayer Book seems to refer to the allowance as set forth in the 1549 BCP).

The government recruited four bishops who had been retired by Queen Mary or gone into exile. Two of the four, William Barlow and John Hodgkins had in Rome's view valid orders, since, having been made bishops in 1536 and 1537 with the Roman Pontifical in the Latin Rite, their consecrations met the criteria according to the definition stated in Apostolicae Curae. John Scory and Miles Coverdale, the other two consecrators, were consecrated with the English Ordinal of 1550 on the same day in 1551 by Cranmer, Hodgkins and Ridley, who were consecrated with the Latin Rite in 1532, 1537 and 1547 respectively. This ordinal was considered defective in form and intention. All four of Parker's consecrators were consecrated by bishops who themselves had been consecrated with the Roman Pontifical in the Church of England which at the time was in schism from Rome. Even though two of the consecrators had orders recognised as validity by Rome the consecration was considered to be "null and void" by Rome because the ordinal used was judged to be defective in matter, form and intention.

In the first year of his archiepiscopate, Parker participated in the consecration of 11 new bishops and confirmed two who had been ordained in previous reigns.

=== Later years ===
Parker avoided involvement in secular politics and was never admitted to Elizabeth's Privy Council. Ecclesiastical politics gave him considerable trouble. Some of the evangelical reformers wanted liturgical changes and at least the option not to wear certain clerical vestments, if not their complete prohibition. Early presbyterians wanted no bishops, and the conservatives opposed all these changes, often preferring to move in the opposite direction toward the practices of the Henrician church. The Queen herself begrudged episcopal privilege until she eventually recognised it as one of the chief bulwarks of royal supremacy. To Parker's consternation, the queen refused to add her imprimatur to his attempts to secure conformity, though she insisted that he achieve this goal. Thus Parker was left to stem the rising tide of Puritan feeling with little support from Parliament, convocation or the Crown.

The bishops' Interpretations and Further Considerations, issued in 1560, tolerated a lower vestments standard than was prescribed by the rubric of 1559, but it fell short of the desires of the anti-vestment clergy such as Coverdale (one of the bishops who had consecrated Parker) who made a public display of their nonconformity in London.

The Book of Advertisements, which Parker published in 1566 to check the anti-vestments faction, had to appear without specific royal sanction; and the Reformatio legum ecclesiasticarum, which John Foxe published with Parker's approval, received neither royal, parliamentary or synodical authorisation. Parliament even contested the claim of the bishops to determine matters of faith. "Surely", said Parker to Peter Wentworth, "you will refer yourselves wholly to us therein." "No, by the faith I bear to God", retorted Wentworth, "we will pass nothing before we understand what it is; for that were but to make you popes. Make you popes who list, for we will make you none."

Disputes about vestments had expanded into a controversy over the whole field of church government and authority. Parker died on 17 May 1575, lamenting that Puritan ideas of "governance" would "in conclusion undo the Queen and all others that depended upon her". By his personal conduct, he had set an ideal example for Anglican priests.

He is buried in the chapel of Lambeth Palace. Matthew Parker Street, near Westminster Abbey, is named after him.

== Residences ==
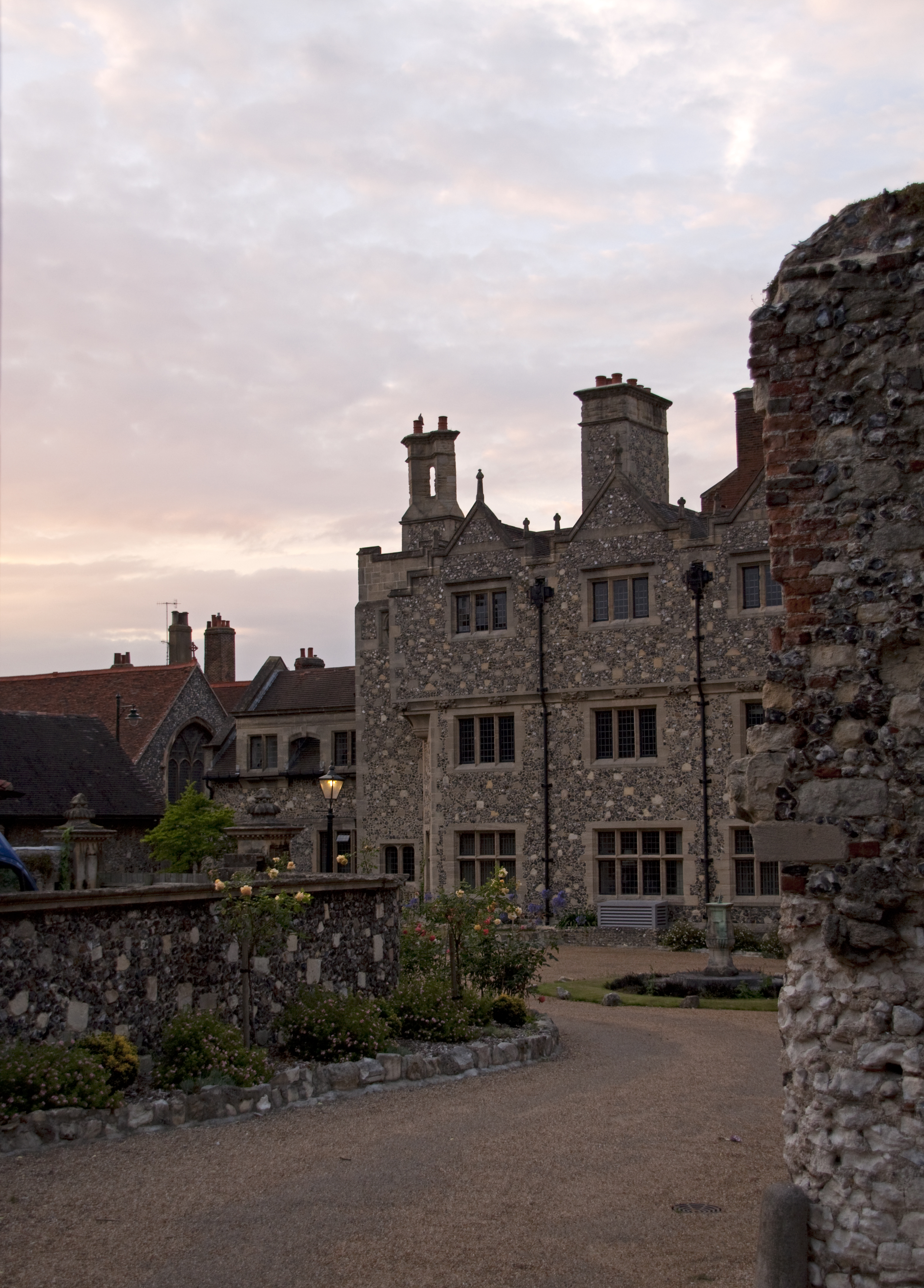
The Old Palace, Canterbury

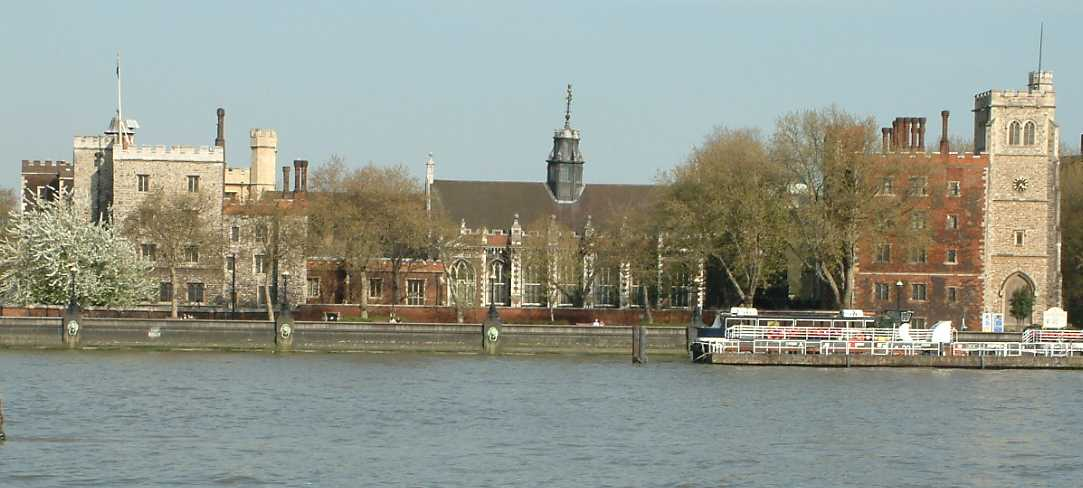
Lambeth Palace, looking east across the River Thames

Official residences of the Archbishop of Canterbury in Parker's day included the Old Palace next to Canterbury Cathedral; Croydon Palace; and Lambeth Palace in London.

== Scholarship ==
Parker's historical research was exemplified in his De antiquitate Britannicæ ecclesiae, and his editions of Asser, Matthew Paris (1571), Thomas Walsingham, and the compiler known as Matthew of Westminster (1571). De antiquitate Britannicæ ecclesiæ was probably printed at Lambeth in 1572, where the archbishop is said to have had an establishment of printers, engravers, and illuminators.

Parker gave the English people the Bishops' Bible, which was undertaken at his request, prepared under his supervision, and published at his expense in 1572. Much of his time and labour from 1563 to 1568 was given to this work. He had also the principal share in drawing up the Book of Common Prayer, for which his skill in ancient liturgies peculiarly fitted him. His liturgical skill was also shown in his version of the psalter. It was under his presidency that the Thirty-nine Articles were finally reviewed and subscribed by the clergy (1562).

Parker published in 1567 an old Saxon Homily on the Sacrament, by Ælfric of Eynsham. He published A Testimonie of Antiquitie Showing the Ancient Fayth in the Church of England Touching the Sacrament of the Body and Bloude of the Lord to prove that transubstantiation was not the doctrine of the ancient English Church. Parker collaborated with his secretary John Joscelyn in his manuscript studies.

=== Manuscript collection ===
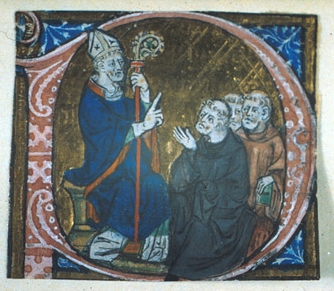
Information about figures such as the Saxon St Erkenwald would be wholly lost without the protection given to them by Matthew Parker

Parker left a priceless collection of manuscripts, largely collected from former monastic libraries, to his college at Cambridge. Bevill has documented the manuscript transcriptions conducted under Parker.

The Parker Library at Corpus Christi bears his name and houses most of his collection, with some volumes in the Cambridge University Library.

The collection includes the important collection of early materials concerning St Erkenwald, the Miracula Sanct Erkenwaldi, preserved as a 12th-century manuscript in the Matthew Parker collection (Parker 161).

The Parker Library on the Web project has made digital images of all of these manuscripts available online.

== Legacy ==
Parker's later reputation for intrusion into the private affairs of his clergy has been attributed as the origin of Nosey Parker, now part of the English language as a synonym for "busybody".

== Works ==
- Bruce, John; Perowne, Thomas Thomason, eds. (1853). Correspondence of Matthew Parker, D.D.: Archbishop of Canterbury : comprising letters written by and to him, from A.D. 1535, to his death, A.D. 1575. Cambridge: Cambridge University Press. OCLC 1042451376.
- Parker, Matthew (1560). The whole Psalter translated into English metre : which contayneth an hundred and fifty Psalmes; the first quinquagene (1st ed.). London: John Daye.
- Parker, Matthew (1605). De antiquitate Britannicae ecclesiae (in Latin). Hannover: typis Wechelianis, apud Claud. Marnium & haeredes Ioannis Aubrii.
- Parker, Matthew (1736). A Testimony of antiquity concerning the sacramental body and blood of Christ.
- Parker, Matthew (1777). Catalogus librorum manuscriptorum quos Collegio corporis Christi et B. Mariae Virginis (in Latin).
- Parker, Matthew (1909). A descriptive catalogue of the manuscripts in the library of Corpus Christi College, Cambridge.
- Parker, Matthew (1729). Matthaei Parker Cantuariensis archiepiscopi De antiquitate Britannicae ecclesiae et privilegiis ecclesiae Cantuariensis (in Latin).
- Matthew, Parker (1571). The gospels of the fower Euangelistes.

== Arms ==
Coat of arms of Matthew Parker

Notes
While serving as a bishop Parker's arms would be displayed impaled with those of the diocese and topped by a mitre.
Escutcheon
Gules on a chevron between three keys Argent as many estoiles of the field.

== See also ==
- Tunes for Archbishop Parker's Psalter

== Sources ==
- Bjorklund, Nancy Balser (2003). "A Godly Wife is an Helper: Matthew Parker and the Defense of Clerical Marriage". Sixteenth Century Journal. 34 (2). Kirksville, Montana: Truman State University: 347–365. doi:10.2307/20061413. JSTOR 20061413. (registration required)
- Brook, Victor John Knight (1962). A life of Archbishop Parker. Oxford: Clarendon Press. OCLC 1150229602.
- Crankshaw, David J.; Gillespie, Alexandra (2004). "Parker, Matthew". Oxford Dictionary of National Biography (online ed.). Oxford University Press. doi:10.1093/ref:odnb/21327. (Subscription, Wikipedia Library access or UK public library membership required.)
- Fairfield, Sheila (1984). The Streets of London – A dictionary of the names and their origins. London: Macmillan. ISBN 9-780-33328-649-4.
- Gilman, D. C.; Peck, H. T.; Colby, F. M., eds. (1905). "Parker, Matthew". New International Encyclopedia (1st ed.). New York: Dodd, Mead.
- Haigh, Christopher (1991). The Tudor Revolutions, Religion, Politics, Society under the Tudors. Oxford: Clarenden Press. ISBN 978-0-19-822162-3.
- Hart, Richard (1862). The Apostolical Succession of the English Clergy Traced from the Earliest Times, And, in the Four Dioceses of Canterbury, London, Norwich, and Ely, Continued to the Year M.DCCC.LXII. London: Rivingtons. OCLC 1062256610.
- Kennedy, William Paul McClure (1908). Archbishop Parker. London: Sir Isaac Pitman & Sons Ltd. OCLC 5228819.
- Kennedy, W. M. (1908a). The "Interpretations" of the Bishops and their influence on Elizabethan episcopal policy (with an appendix of the original documents) (PDF). London: Longmans, Green & Co.
- MacCullough, Diarmid (1990). The Later Reformation in England, 1547-1603 (2nd ed.). Basingstoke, UK: Palgrave. ISBN 978-0-333-69331-5.
- Moorman, John Richard Humpidge (1983). The Anglican Spiritual Tradition. Springfield, Illinois: Templegate. ISBN 978-0-87243-125-6.
- O'Riordan, M. (1913). "Apostolicae Curae". In Herbermann, Charles (ed.). Catholic Encyclopedia. New York: Robert Appleton Company.
- This article incorporates text from a publication now in the public domain: Mullinger, James Bass (1895). "Parker, Matthew". In Lee, Sidney (ed.). Dictionary of National Biography. Vol. 43. London: Smith, Elder & Co. pp. 254–264.
- Pollard, Albert Frederick (1911). "Parker, Matthew" . Encyclopædia Britannica. Vol. 20 (11th ed.). pp. 828–829.
- Smith, Lucy Baldwin (1967). The Elizabethan World. Boston: Houghton Mifflin. OCLC 1740642. (registration required)
- Strype, John (1821). The Life and Acts of Matthew Parker. Vol. 1. Oxford: Clarendon Press. OCLC 2430394.
- Temple, Frederick; Maclagan, William (1897). Answer of the Archbishops of England to the Apostolic Letter of Pope Leo XIII on English Ordinations. London: Longmans, Green, and Co. OCLC 983135605.
- Weir, Alison (1999). Elizabeth the Queen. London: Pimlico. ISBN 9-780-71267-312-9. (registration required)

Church of England titles
Preceded by Reginald Pole	Archbishop of Canterbury; 1559–1575	Succeeded by Edmund Grindal
Academic offices
Preceded by John Madew	Vice-Chancellor of the University of Cambridge; 1545	Succeeded by John Madew
Preceded by William Bill	Vice-Chancellor of the University of Cambridge; 1548	Succeeded by Walter Haddon
Preceded by William Sowode	Master of Corpus Christi College, Cambridge; 1544–1553	Succeeded by Lawrence Moptyd
