= Nag's Head Fable =

Fabricated account of the consecration of Matthew Parker as Archbishop of Canterbury

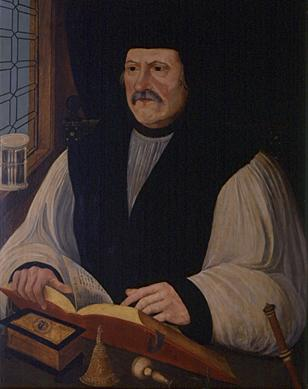
Archbishop Matthew Parker

The Nag's Head Fable was a fiction which purported that Matthew Parker, Archbishop of Canterbury under Elizabeth I, was consecrated with a Bible pressed to his neck in the Nag's Head tavern in Cheapside. The story surfaced more than 40 years after Parker's consecration and was spread by some Roman Catholics as fact until the dawn of the 20th century.

== Fact and fiction ==
On the passing of the Act of Uniformity 1559, shortly after the start of Elizabeth I's reign, fourteen bishops were dismissed from their sees, and all the other sees, except Llandaff (then part of the Church of England), were at the time vacant. Matthew Parker had been selected as Archbishop of Canterbury, but there was a question of how to obtain consecration so as to preserve unbroken apostolic succession, as the Bishop of Llandaff, Anthony Kitchin, opposed Parker's appointment and refused to officiate. The allegation of an indecent consecration in the Nag's Head tavern was first made in a controversial book entitled De investiganda vera ac visibili Christi ecclesia libellus, printed at Antwerp by a Jesuit and exiled Anglo-Romanist priest, Christopher Holywood (or Christophorus a Sacrobosco), in 1604, over 40 years after the event.

According to propaganda, John Scory, the deposed Bishop of Chichester, was sent for and officiated at the Nag's Head tavern in Cheapside. There, Parker was supposedly consecrated by having a Bible pressed to his neck while Scory said, "Take thou authority to preach the word of God sincerely."

This story was later discredited, as a full eyewitness description was found of the consecration of Parker, in Lambeth Palace Chapel, by bishops John Scory, William Barlow (chief consecrator), Myles Coverdale, and John Hodgkins. In this account it is stated that it was not the consecration which took place at the Nag's Head, but only that those who took part in it dined there subsequently.

As recently as the late nineteenth century, the legend was still being told as fact by controversialists in such countries as Sri Lanka.

== Sources ==
- Brewer, E. Cobham (1894). Dictionary of Phrase and Fable.
- Moss, C. B. (1965) [1943]. The Christian Faith: An Introduction to Dogmatic Theology. London: SPCK – via Katapi.
