= St Augustine Gospels =

6th-century gospel book in England

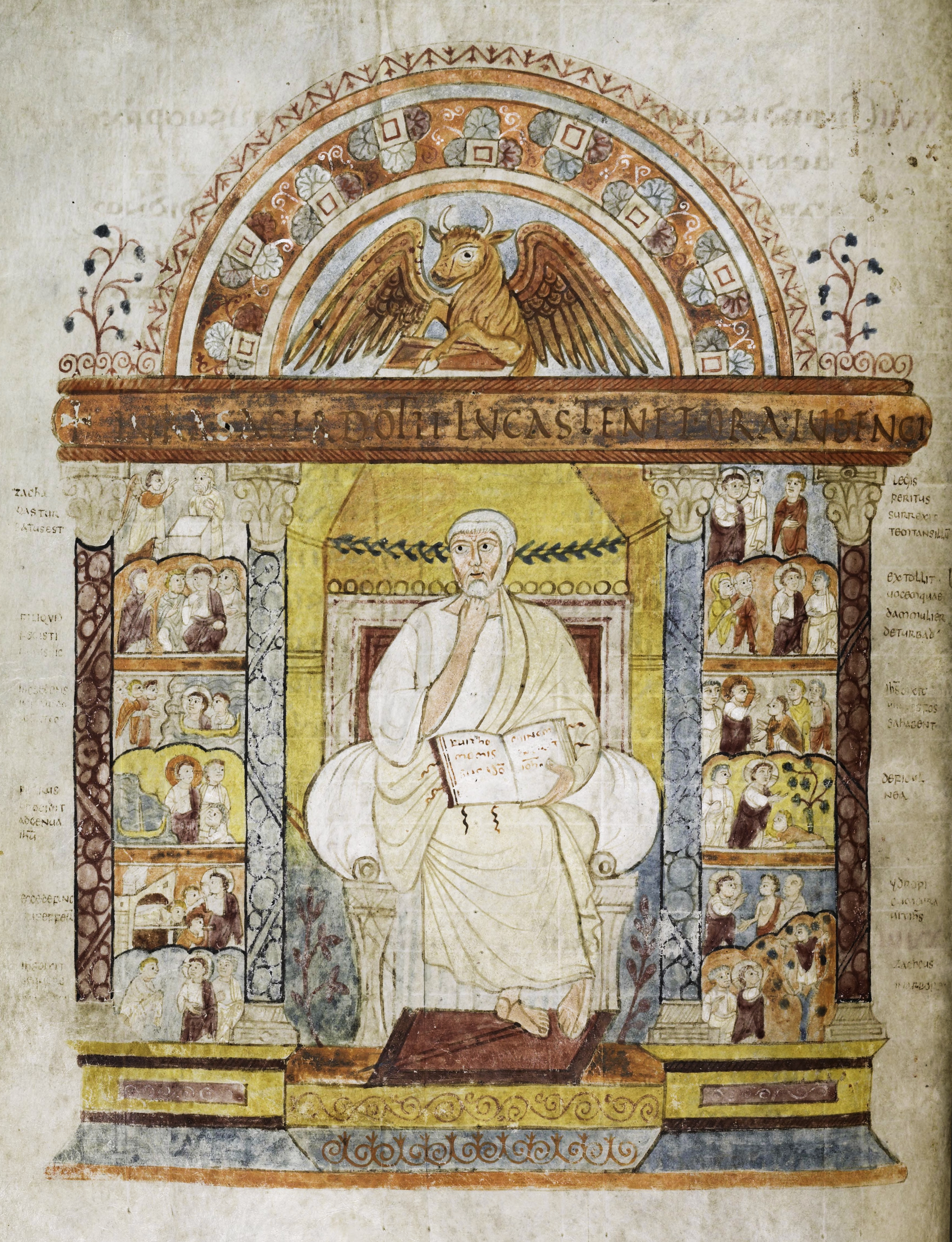
The evangelist portrait of Luke under the inscription Iura sacerdotii Lucas tenet ore iuuenci from Carmen paschale by Coelius Sedulius. Gospels of Saint Augustine, Corpus Christi College, Cambridge, Ms. 286, fol. 129v

The St Augustine Gospels (Cambridge, Corpus Christi College, Lib. MS. 286) is an illuminated Gospel Book which dates from the 6th century and has been in the Parker Library in Corpus Christi College, Cambridge since 1575. It was made in Italy and has been in England since fairly soon after its creation; by the 16th century it had probably already been at Canterbury for almost a thousand years. It has 265 leaves measuring about 252 x 196 mm, and is not entirely complete, in particular missing pages with miniatures.

This manuscript is the oldest surviving illustrated Latin (rather than Greek or Syriac) Gospel Book, and one of the oldest European books in existence. Although the only surviving illuminations are two full-page miniatures, these are of great significance in art history as so few comparable images have survived. "When this manuscript was made, Latin was still generally spoken, and Jerome [author of the Vulgate translation, of which this text is a copy], who died in 420, was then no more distant in time than (say) Walter Scott or Emily Brontë are to us."

The Church of England calls the book the Canterbury Gospels, though to scholars this name usually refers to another book, an 8th-century Anglo-Saxon gospel book written at Canterbury, now with one portion in the British Library as Royal MS 1 E VI, and another in the Library of Canterbury Cathedral.

== History ==
The manuscript is traditionally, and plausibly, considered to be either a volume brought by St Augustine of Canterbury to England with the Gregorian mission in 597, or one of a number of books recorded as being sent to him in 601 by Pope Gregory the Great – like other scholars, Kurt Weitzmann sees "no reason to doubt" the tradition. The main text is written in an Italian uncial hand which is widely accepted as dating to the 6th century – Rome or Monte Cassino have been suggested as the place of creation. It was certainly in England by the late 7th or early 8th century when corrections and additions were made to the text in an insular hand. The additions included tituli or captions to the scenes around the portrait of Luke, not all of which may reflect the intentions of the original artist.

The book was certainly at St Augustine's Abbey, Canterbury in the 10th century, when the first of several documents concerning the Abbey were copied into it. In the late Middle Ages it was "kept not in the Library at Canterbury but actually lay on the altar; it belonged in other words, like a reliquary or the Cross, to Church ceremonial". The manuscript was given to the Parker Library, Corpus Christi College, Cambridge as part of the collection donated by Matthew Parker, Archbishop of Canterbury in 1575, some decades after the Dissolution of the Monasteries. It was traditionally used for the swearing of the oath in the enthronements of new Archbishops of Canterbury, and the tradition has been restored since 1945; the book is taken to Canterbury Cathedral by the Parker librarian of Corpus for each ceremony. The Augustine Gospels have also been taken to Canterbury for other major occasions: the visit of Pope John Paul II in 1982, and the celebrations in 1997 for the 1,400th anniversary of the Gregorian mission. In 2023 the Gospels were carried in the procession at the coronation of Charles III and Camilla. As far as is known it is the first time they have been used in a coronation. The book was open at the page with the portrait of Saint Luke.

The manuscript was rebound at the British Museum in 1948–49 with plain oak boards and a spine of cream alum-tawed goatskin.

== Text ==
The manuscript is "more or less the oldest substantially complete copy" of Jerome's translation of the Gospels. His late-4th-century Vulgate gradually replaced the earlier Vetus Latina ("Old Latin") text used by Christians in the Roman Empire. A 1933 analysis of the St Augustine Gospels by Hermann Glunz documented around 700 variants from the standard Vulgate: most are minor differences of spelling or word order, but in some cases the scribe chooses readings from the Vetus Latina. This supports the St Augustine connection, as Gregory the Great, the supposed donor, wrote in his Moralia that he was using the more fluent Vulgate, except for certain passages where he found the Old Latin more suitable, and his Forty Homilies on the Gospels opts for the older translation in the same places as the St Augustine Gospels.

== Miniatures ==
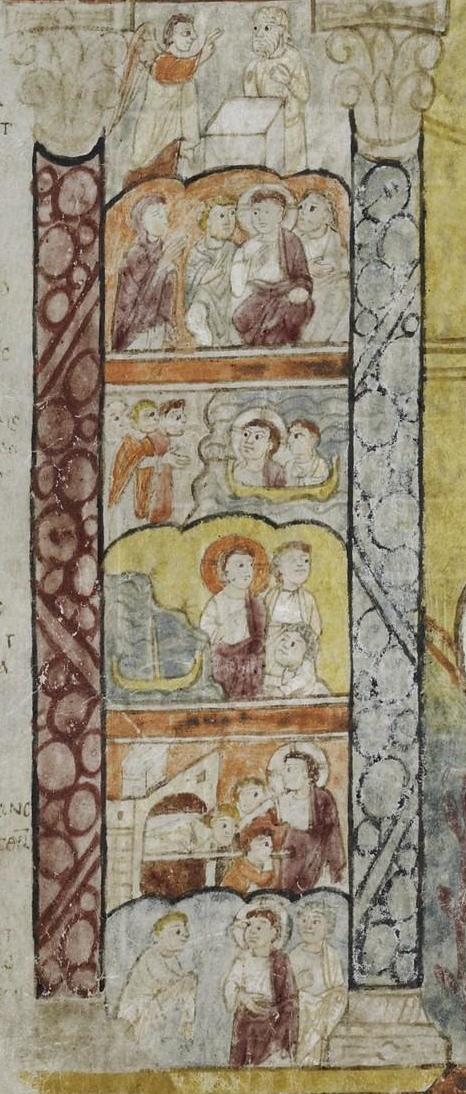
The left-hand scenes on the portrait of Luke

The manuscript once contained evangelist portraits for all four Evangelists, preceding their gospel, a usual feature of illuminated Gospel books, and at least three further pages of narrative scenes, one following each portrait page. Only the two pages preceding Luke have survived. However the surviving total of twenty-four small scenes from the Life of Christ are very rare survivals and of great interest in the history of Christian iconography, especially as they come from the old Western Empire – the only comparable narrative Gospel cycles from manuscripts in the period are Greek, notably the Rossano Gospels, and Sinope Gospels, or the Syriac Rabbula Gospels. The equivalent Old Testament cycles are more varied however, including the Greek Vienna Genesis and Cotton Genesis, the Latin Ashburnham Pentateuch, the Quedlinburg Itala fragment, and some others.

The miniatures have moved further from classical style than those in the Greek manuscripts, with "a linear style which not only flattens the figure, but begins to develop a rhythmic quality in the linear design which must be seen as the beginning of a process of intentional abstraction". For another historian, the figures in the small scenes have "a linear form which we immediately perceive to be medieval" and "are no longer paintings, but tinted drawings. The same tendency is exhibited in the treatment of the architecture and ornament; the naturalistic polychrome accessories of a manuscript like the Vienna Dioscurides are flattened and attenuated into a calligraphic pattern."

The subject of the influence of the miniatures on later Anglo-Saxon art has often been raised, though in view of most of the presumed picture pages of this manuscript now being lost, and the lack of knowledge as to what other models were available to form the Continental post-classical aspects of the Insular style that developed from the 7th century onwards (with Canterbury as a major centre), all comments by art historians have necessarily been speculative. It is clear from the variety of styles of evangelist portraits found in early Insular manuscripts, echoing examples known from the Continent, that other models were available, and there is a record of an illuminated and imported Bible of St Gregory at Canterbury in the 7th century. Later works mentioned as probably influenced by the Augustine Gospels include the Stockholm Codex Aureus and the St Gall Gospel Book. In general, though evangelist portraits became a common feature of Insular and Anglo-Saxon Gospel books, the large number of small scenes in the Augustine Gospels were not seen again until much later works like the Eadwine Psalter, made in the 12th century in Canterbury, which has prefatory pages with small narrative images in grids in a similar style to the Augustine Gospels.

=== Evangelist portrait of Luke ===
Of the four portrait pages, only that for Luke survives (Folio 129v). He is shown sitting on a marble throne, with a cushion, in an elaborate architectural setting, probably based on the scaenae frons of a Roman theatre – a common convention for Late Antique miniatures, coins and Imperial portraiture. The pose with the chin resting on a hand suggests an origin in classical author portraits of philosophers – more often evangelists are shown writing. Above a cornice sits the winged ox, Luke's evangelist's symbol. The pediment has an inscription with a hexameter from the Carmen Paschale by the 5th-century Christian poet Coelius Sedulius (Book 1, line 357): "Iura sacerdotii Lucas tenet ore iuvenci" – "Luke holds the laws of priesthood in the mouth of the young bull" (iuvencus meaning also "young man").

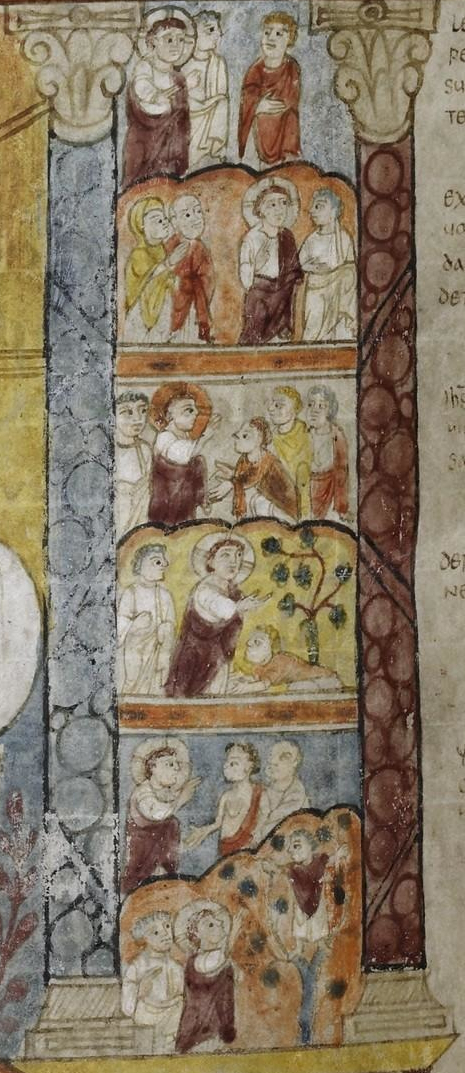
Right-hand scenes

More unusually, twelve small scenes drawn from Luke, mostly of the Works of Christ (who can be identified as the only figure with a halo), are set between columns in the architectural frame to the portrait. This particular arrangement is unique in surviving early evangelist portraits, though similar strips of scenes are found in ivory book-covers from the same period. The scenes themselves probably drew from a now-destroyed fresco cycle of the Life of Christ in Santa Maria Antiqua in Rome.

The scenes, many of which were rarely depicted in art from later medieval periods, include:

- The Annunciation to Zechariah (left, top, Luke 1, 8–20), as he officiates at the Temple
- Christ among the Doctors (left, 2nd down, Luke 2, 43–50) which omits Saint Joseph, probably from lack of space; Mary enters to the left.
- Christ preaching from the boat (left, 3rd down, Luke 5, 3)
- The Calling of Peter (left, 4th down, Luke 5, 8)
- The Miracle of the son of the widow of Naim, (left, 5th down, Luke 7, 12–16) at the "gate of the city".
- The Calling of Matthew, a very rare scene (left bottom, Luke 5, 27–32).
- "...And behold a certain lawyer stood up, tempting him and saying, Master, what must I do to possess eternal life?" (right, top: Luke 10, 25)
- "...a certain woman from the crowd, lifting up her voice, said to him..." (right 2nd down, Luke 11, 27–28): "extollens vocem quaedam mulier de turba".
- The Miracle of the Bent Woman (right 3rd down, Luke 13, 10–17), though labelled with text from Luke 9, 58: "Foxes have holes" (see below).
- The one leper out of the ten (?), Luke 17, 12–19
- The Healing of the Man with Dropsy (Luke 14, 2–5)
- The Calling of Zacchaeus (right, bottom), who had climbed a tree to see Christ better (Luke 19, 1–10).

The captions in the margins, added later, probably in the 8th century from the handwriting, name the scenes or are quotations or near-quotations from the Vulgate text of Luke identifying them. For example, the top right caption reads: "legis peritus surrexit temptans illum" or "[a] lawyer stood up, tempting him", from Luke 10, 25. The caption two below this one may misidentify the scene depicted, according to Carol Lewine. Even those, like Francis Wormold, who support the caption, admit the scene could not be so identified without it. The caption reads:"Ih[esu]s dixit vulpes fossa habent", a paraphrase of the start of Luke 9, 58 (and Matthew 8, 20): "et ait illi Iesus vulpes foveas habent et volucres caeli nidos Filius autem hominis non habet ubi caput reclinet" – "Jesus said to him: The foxes have holes, and the birds of the air nests: but the Son of man hath not where to lay his head." The image shows Jesus blessing a bent figure, which could match the quotation, or a miracle.

=== Passion scenes ===
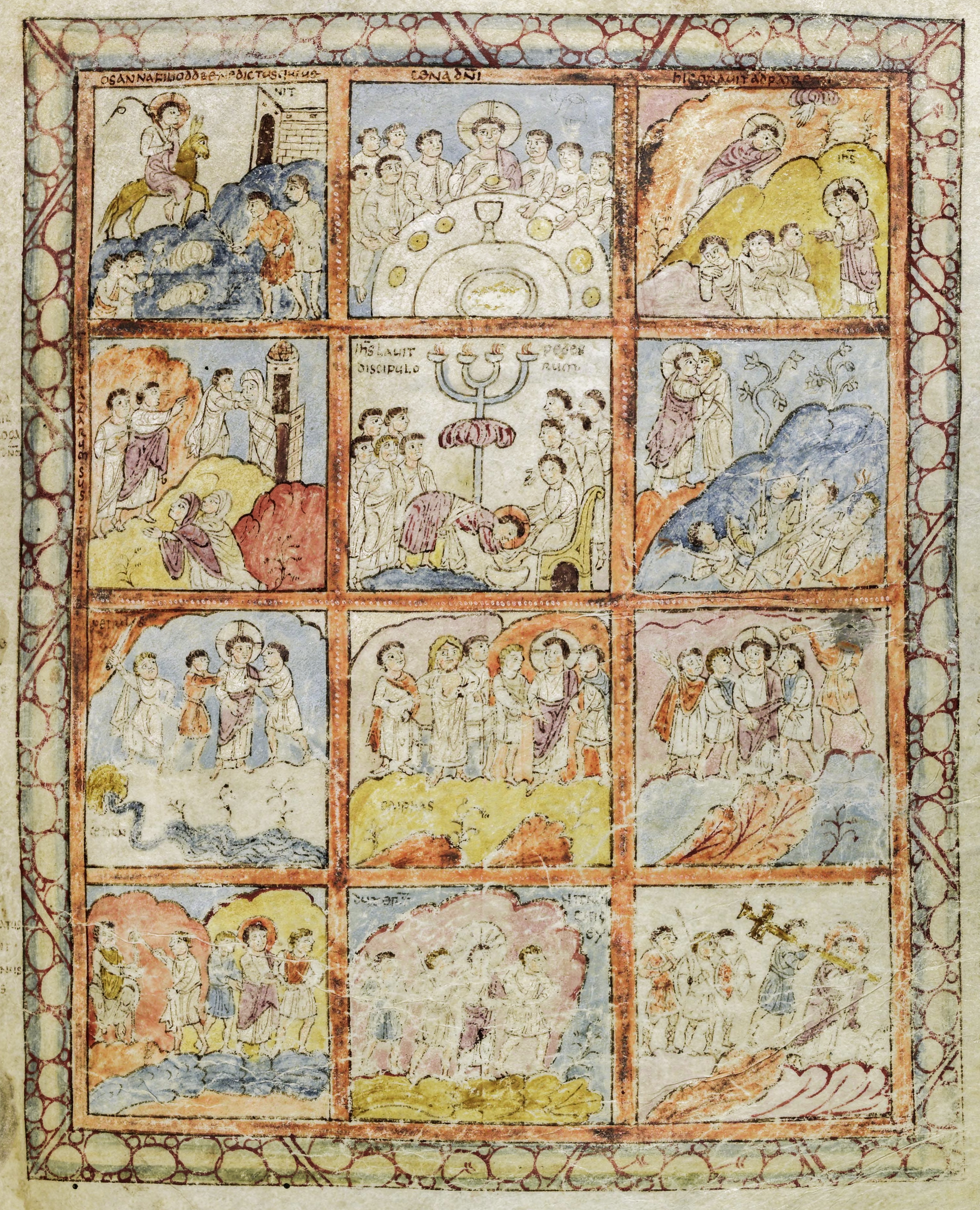
Folio 125r contains 12 scenes from the Passion

A full-page miniature on folio 125r prior to Luke contains twelve narrative scenes from the Life of Christ, all from the Passion except the Raising of Lazarus. This was included because, following John 11.46 ff. it was considered the immediate cause of the Sanhedrin's decision to move against Christ. As in the few other surviving cycles of the Life from the 6th century, the Crucifixion itself is not shown, the sequence ending with Christ carrying the Cross. However at least two further such pages once existed, at the start of other Gospels. Luke is the third gospel, so a panel preceding the Gospel of John might well have completed the Passion and Resurrection story, and two others covered the earlier life of Christ. The scenes around Luke's portrait notably avoid the major episodes in Christ's life such as his Nativity, Baptism and Temptation, probably reserving these scenes for other grid pages.

Compared to other cycles of the time, such as that in mosaic at the Basilica of Sant'Apollinare Nuovo in Ravenna, the Passion scenes show an emphasis on the suffering of Christ that was probably influenced by the art of the Eastern Empire and shows the direction Western depictions were to follow in subsequent centuries.

From top left the twelve scenes shown, some of which have captions, are:

- Christ's entry into Jerusalem
- Last Supper, the earliest Western image to show the moment of the first Eucharist, rather than the betrayal of Judas.
- Agony in the Garden of Gethsemane
- Raising of Lazarus
- Washing of feet
- Betrayal of Christ
- Arrest of Jesus
- Sanhedrin Trial of Jesus
- Mocking of Christ
- Pontius Pilate washes his hands
- Christ led from Pilate,
- Simon of Cyrene helps Christ carrying the Cross

In contrast to the scenes around the portrait, all of these scenes except Christ led from Pilate were to remain very common in large narrative cycles throughout the Middle Ages and beyond. The difficulty of identifying many of the episodes of the Works from Luke demonstrates one of the reasons why scenes from the period of Christ's ministry became increasingly less common in medieval art. Another reason for this was the lack of feast-days celebrating them. The two scenes at the top of the central column on the Passion page, in contrast, feature in the gospel reading set for Maundy Thursday, and most of the scenes on this page are easily identified. The Raising of Lazarus, with the body in its white winding-cloth, was one miracle that was easily recognised in images, and remained in the usual repertoire of artists. The Hand of God in the Agony in the Garden is the earliest surviving example of the motif in this scene.

== Bibliography ==
- Full bibliography from the Parker Library
