= Parker Library, Corpus Christi College =

Library in Cambridge, England

Parker Library
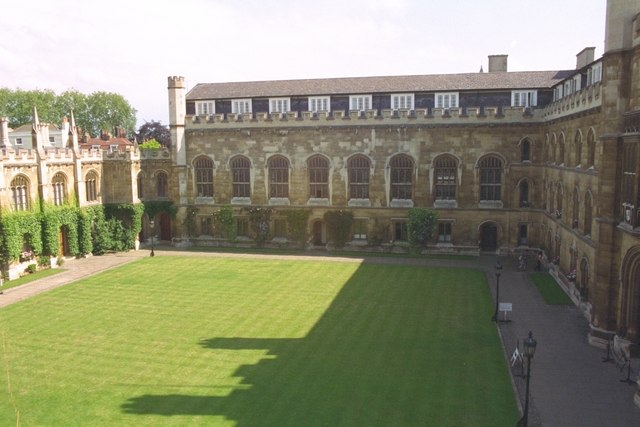
- The Parker Library viewed from the opposite side of New Court. The Wilkins' Room, with large arched windows, is on the 1st floor
- 52.202783908856375°N 0.11811900457760047°E
- Location: Cambridge, England
- Type: Academic library

Other information
- Affiliation: Corpus Christi College
- Website: https://www.corpus.cam.ac.uk/

The Parker Library is a library within Corpus Christi College, Cambridge which contains rare books and manuscripts. It is known throughout the world due to its invaluable collection of more than 600 manuscripts, particularly medieval texts, the majority of which were bequeathed to the college by Archbishop of Canterbury Matthew Parker, a former Master of Corpus Christi College.

== Collection ==
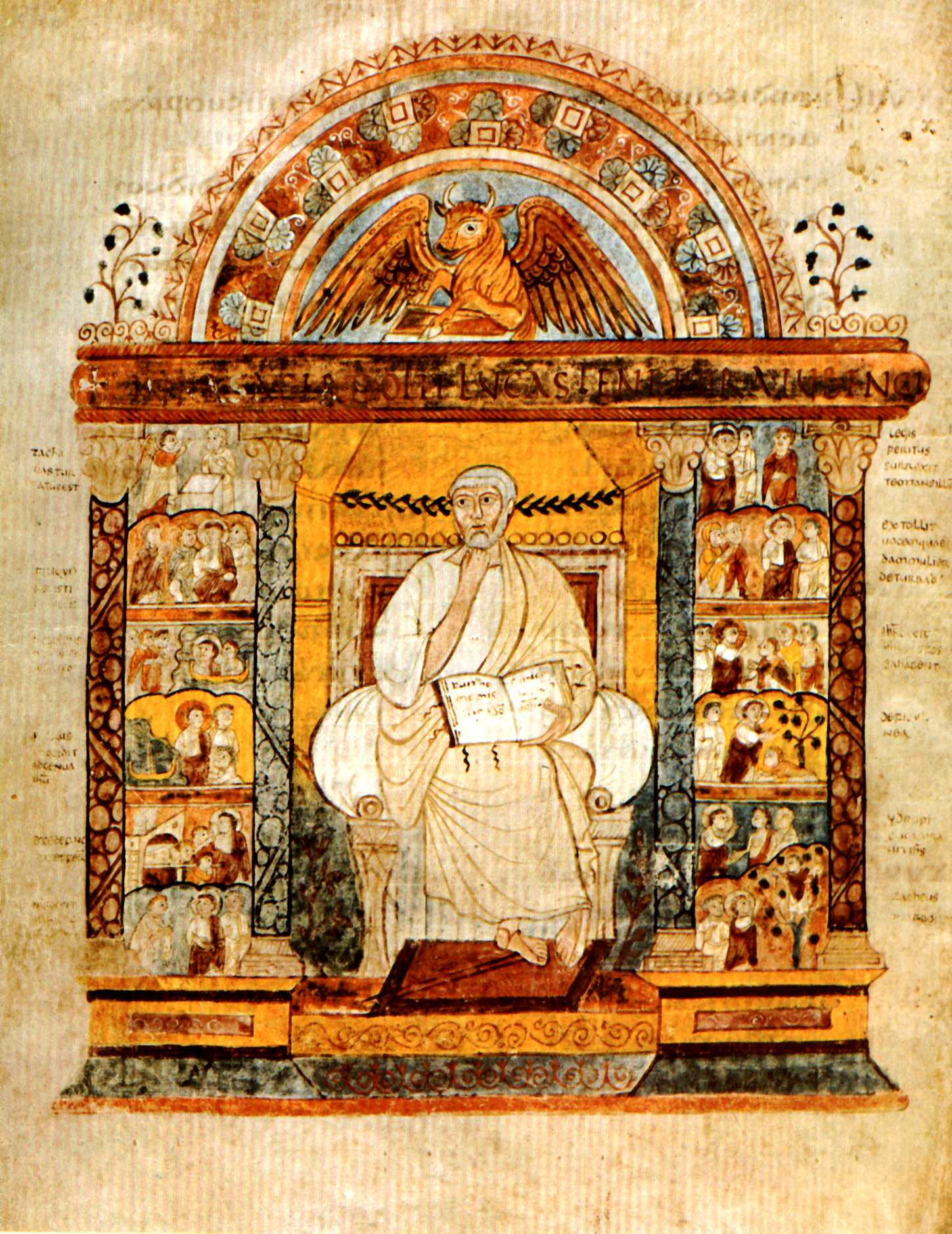
Portrait of St Luke, Folio 129v of the St Augustine Gospels (MS 286)

The library houses a significant proportion of Anglo-Saxon manuscripts, including the earliest copy of the Anglo-Saxon Chronicle (Version A of the ASC, Corp. Chris. MS 173, known as the Winchester Chronicle or the Parker Chronicle, c. 890), the Old English Bede, and King Alfred's translation of Pastoral Care (a manual for priests), as well as the Latin St Augustine Gospels, one of the oldest bound books in existence. The collection also includes key Middle English texts, such as the Ancrene Wisse, the Brut Chronicle and Geoffrey Chaucer's Troilus and Criseyde. Other items include medieval travelogues and maps, apocalypses, bestiaries, one of the oldest pieces of extant written music, and illuminated manuscripts, such as the two giant Romanesque bibles of Bury (c. 1135) and Dover (c. 1150) and the Chronica Majora by Matthew Paris (c. 1250). A full, alphabetised catalogue is available here.

Its most prestigious possession is the St Augustine Gospels (Cambridge, Corpus Christi College, Lib. MS. 286), believed to have been brought to England by the Augustinian mission, sent by Pope Gregory I to convert the people of Britain in AD 597. It is an illuminated Gospel Book created in Italy in the 6th century and has been in England since soon after its creation. It has 265 leaves measuring about 252 x 196 mm, and is not entirely complete, missing pages with miniatures in particular. This manuscript is the oldest surviving Latin (as opposed to Greek or Syriac) illustrated Gospel book, and one of the oldest European books in existence. Although the only surviving illuminations are two full-page miniatures, these are of great significance in art history, as so few comparable images have survived. The Gospels are used in the enthronement of the Archbishops of Canterbury today and are transported to and from Canterbury for this occasion by the Master and college representatives. In 2023 the St Augustine Gospels were used as part of the Coronation of Charles III and Camilla at Westminster Abbey.

In October 2016, Christopher de Hamel announced that an 11th-century Anglo-Saxon psalter (Cambridge, Corpus Christi College, Lib. MS. 411) in the library's collection had "undoubtedly" belonged to Thomas Becket, and it was possible that Becket was holding this very psalter when he was murdered in 1170. The psalter bears a 16th-century inscription attributing its ownership to Becket, but this claim had previously been dismissed as ridiculous. However, after learning of a reference to a psalter owned by Becket in a sacrists' roll from Canterbury Cathedral, de Hamel realised that the library's psalter matched the one described in the sacrists' roll. The identity of the psalter was supported by a 13th-century stained glass portrait of Becket in Canterbury Cathedral in which he cradles a similarly bound and coloured book under his left arm. Based on the workmanship of the psalter, de Hamel guesses that it was originally created for an archbishop, possibly Ælfheah of Canterbury.

Although exhibitions of some of the materials are periodically held, access to the full collection of manuscripts held in Corpus Christi College is limited to scholars. The public are able to see some of the treasures of the library at open days, notably during the annual 'Open Cambridge' event, or, since the addition of the vault and new learning facilities on the ground floor has freed up room in the original library, on private tours.

== History ==
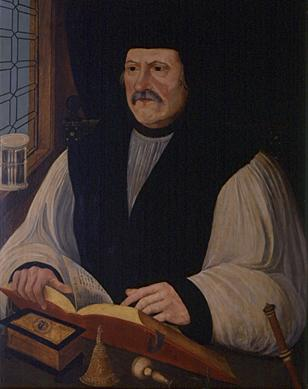
Archbishop Matthew Parker, the college's greatest benefactor

The collection was begun in 1376, shortly after the college's founding, and much improved by a bequest from Matthew Parker in 1574, the college's Master between 1544 and 1553. He served as chaplain to Anne Boleyn, Vice-Chancellor of Cambridge University, and Archbishop of Canterbury from 1559 to 1575. It was during this time that he formed a fine collection of manuscripts, salvaged from the libraries of dissolved monasteries.

As part of his collection process, Parker employed a number of scholars, scribes, and book artisans to acquire, curate, maintain, and edit his manuscripts. Stephen Batman, one of Parker's chaplains, boasted to have collected 6,700 books over the course of four years for the Archbishop, though very few of them were selected for the library:

"Among whose Bookes remayned, althoughe the moste parte according to the tyme, yet some worthy the viewe and safe kéeping, gathered wythin foure yeares, of Diuinitie, Astronomie, Historie, Phisicke, and others of sundrye Artes and Sciences (as I can truely auouche, hauing his Graces commission wherevnto his hande is yet to be séene) sixe thousand seauen hundred Bookes, by my onelye trauaile, whereof choyse being taken, he most gratiouslye bestowed many on Corpus Christi Colledge in Cambridge."

In his correspondence, Parker often discussed his curatorial process. Writing to William Cecil in 1573, Parker defended his collection of manuscripts as part of his duty to preserve and print "such rare and written authors that came to my hands, until the days of King Henry the VIIIth, when the religion began to grow better." With this purpose in mind, Parker claimed to "have within my house in wages, drawers and cutters, painters and limners, writers, and bookbinders." In another letter to Cecil from 1565, Parker described the process of supplementing missing pages of text within his manuscripts by having his skilled scribes imitate the style and layout of other medieval models. Noticing that an early English Psalter of Cecil's (in this case, Parker was describing the Vespasian Psalter) lacked the first psalm, Parker suggested moving a miniature of David with his harp from the 30th folio to the opening of the book and supplying the missing portions in an imitative style "counterfeited in antiquity."

Though he had already been collecting manuscripts for many years, Parker received official support from the Privy Council in 1568 to continue his search for important historical and religious documents throughout the country. This letter is now preserved in the Parker library in CCCC MS 114a, p.49. As one of the architects of the Elizabethan Settlement and the modern Church of England, Parker was keenly interested in collecting and preserving manuscripts from Anglo-Saxon England as evidence of an ancient English-speaking church independent of Rome. Parker wished to demonstrate an apostolic succession for the English Church. The original gift from Parker consisted of about 480 manuscripts and around 1000 printed books spanning the 6th–16th centuries.

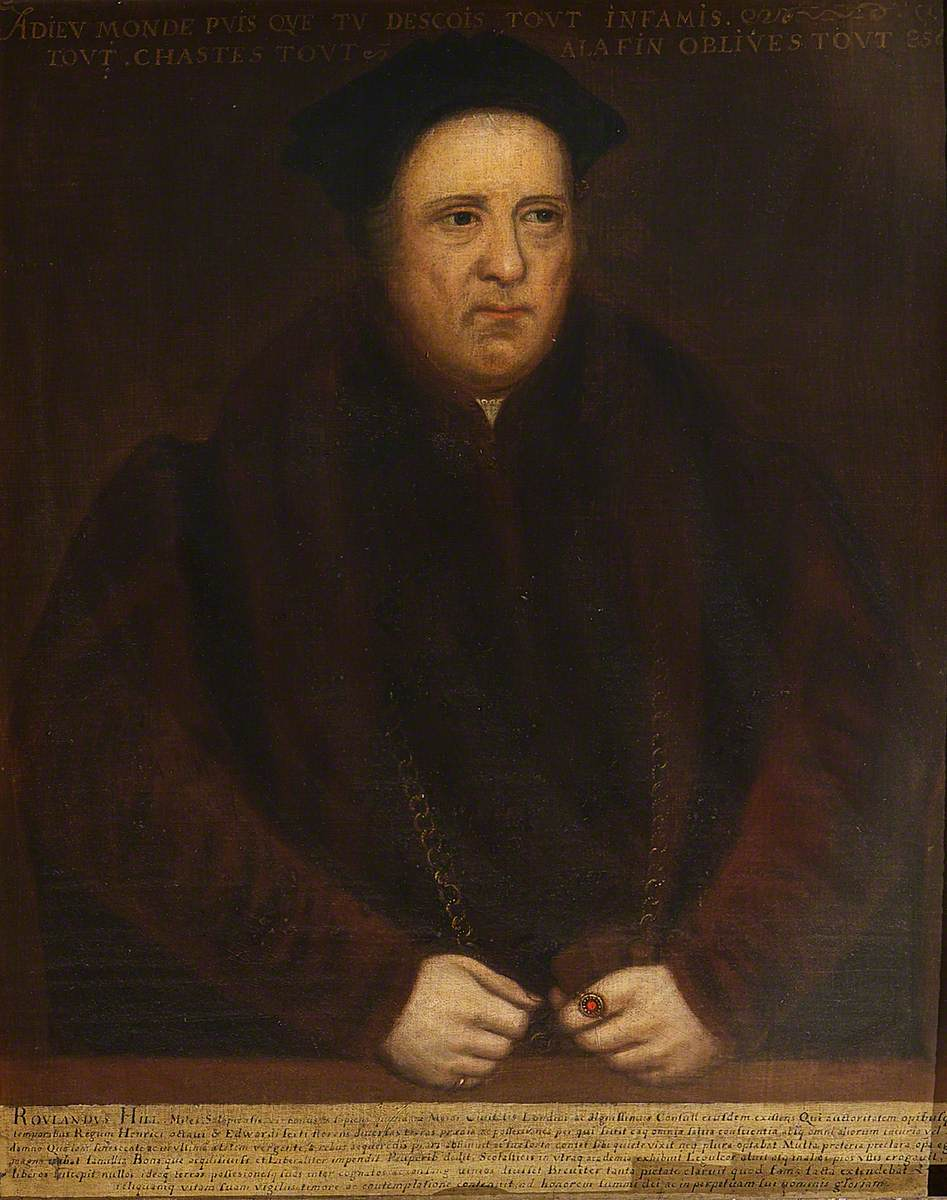
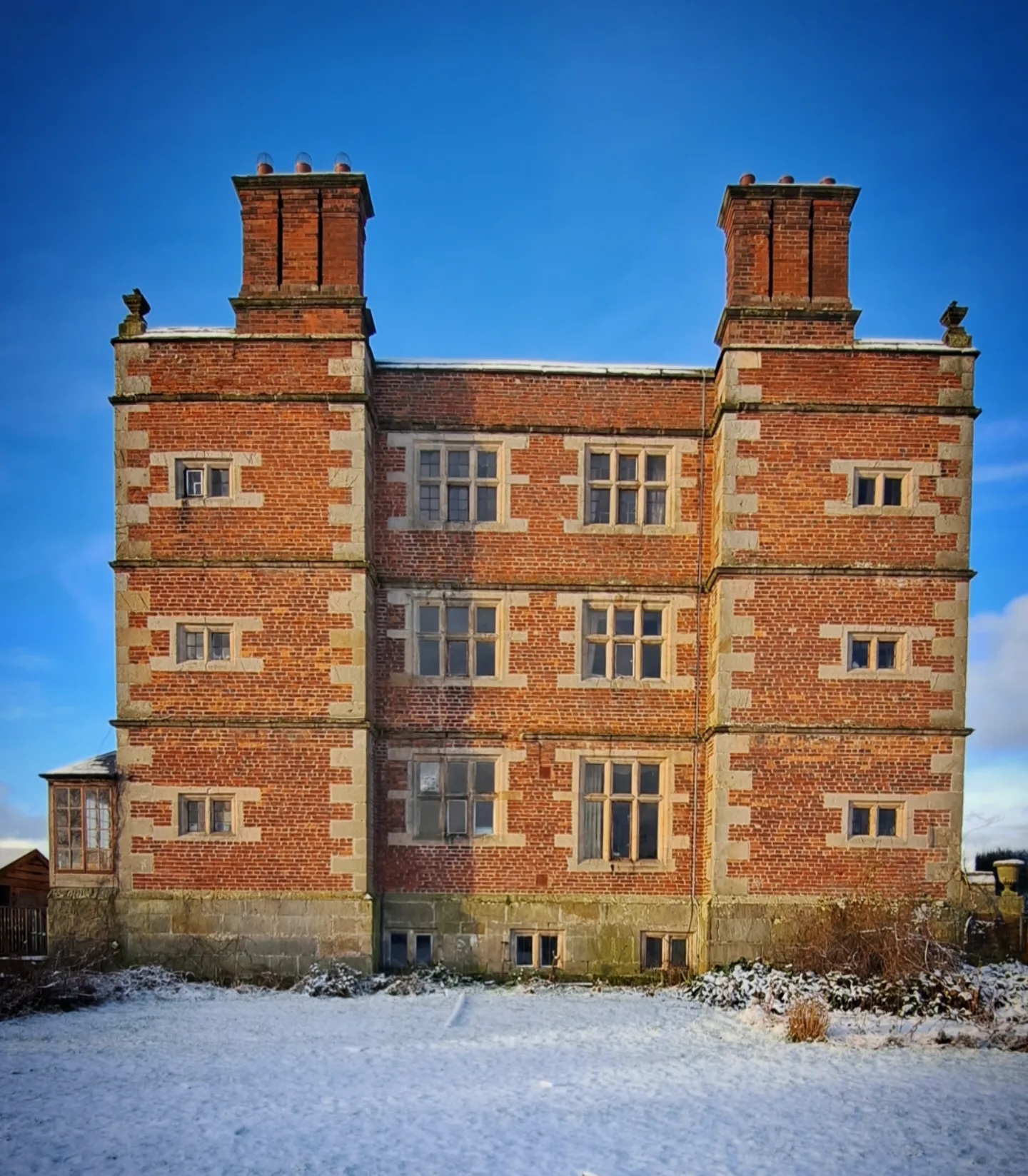
Sir Rowland Hill and his rural headquarters at Soulton in Shropshire. It is possible that Hill sheltered Parker and his scholarly materials at Soulton while he and they were in danger in the counter reformation.

The historian James D. Wenn has suggested that Parker may have enjoyed the protection of Sir Rowland Hill of Soulton, Shropshire, during his period of disfavour under Mary I, when this collection would have been in danger, along with Parker himself; Hill was the publisher of the Geneva Bible and joined Parker as a Commissioner for Ecclesiastical Cases in 1559.

As early as the sixteenth century, this collection was recognised as a unique treasure, and Parker did not bequeath it without any strings. Within the terms of his endowment, Parker stated that if any more than a certain number of books were lost, the rest of the collection would pass first to Gonville and Caius College, Cambridge and then (in the event of any more losses) to Trinity Hall, Cambridge. Every few years, representatives from both of those colleges ceremonially inspect the collection for any losses. Parker placed a similar condition on the silver that he also bequeathed to the college, and these stipulations are part of the reason that Corpus Christi College retains to this day the entirety of the library and the silver collection, as they were unable to sell off (or melt down) the less valuable parts of either collection without losing both.

The collection has been housed in the Wilkins' Room, along the length of the south side of New Court within the college, since 1827. The ground floor, which was until 2006 the college's student library, has been converted into a temperature-controlled, fire-proof vault and separate reading room for visiting academics.

The current librarian is Philippa Hoskins, elected as the second Donnelley Fellow Librarian in 2019. In 2004 the college established The Friends of The Parker Library, a small subscription-based club in order to raise money and secure the future of the library.

== List of Parker librarians ==
- R. I. Page, 1965–1985
- Nigel Wilkins, 1985–1997
- Frederick William Ratcliffe, 1997–2000
- Christopher de Hamel, 2000–2019
- Philippa Hoskins, 2019–present

== Parker Library on the Web ==
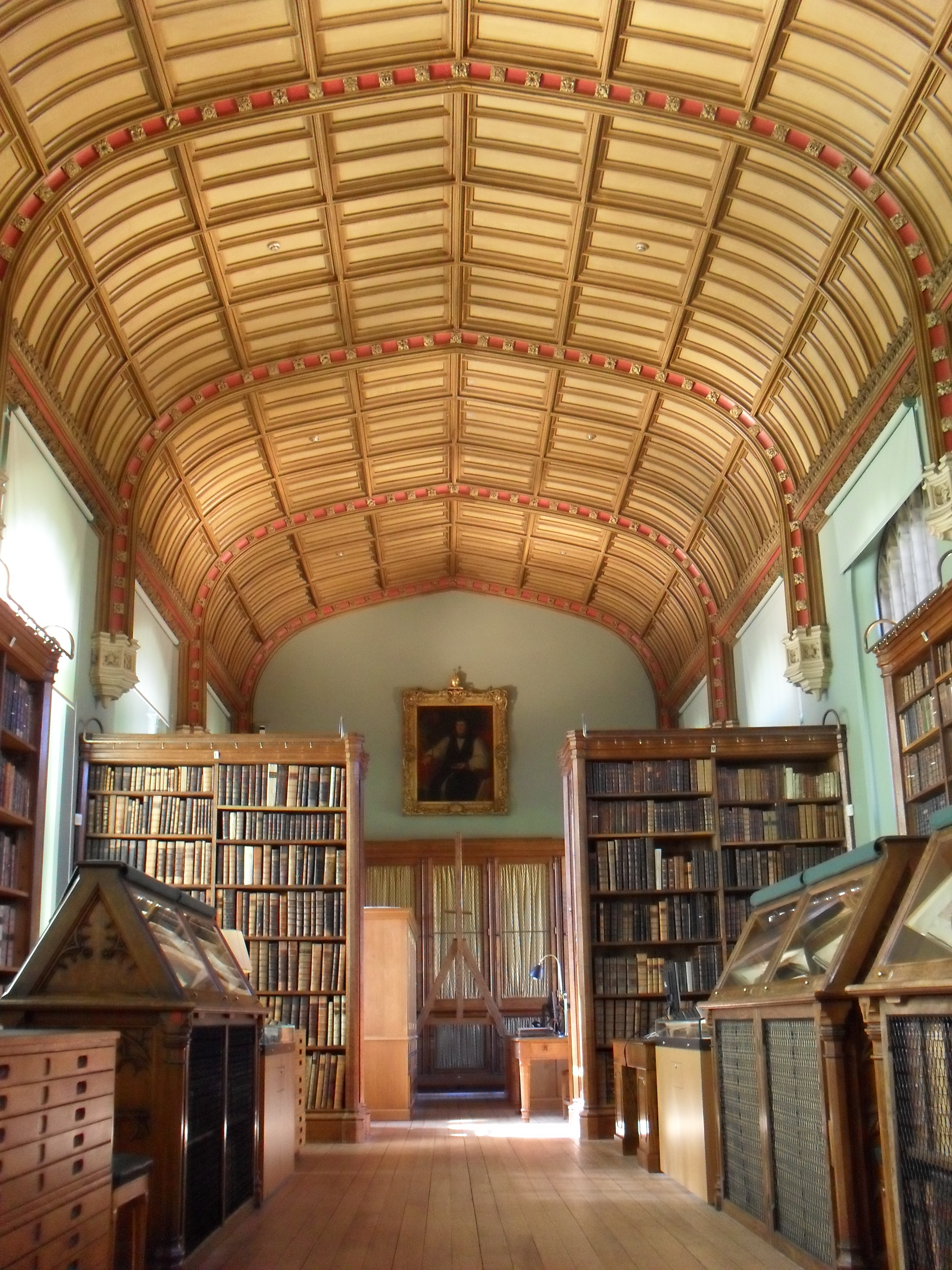
A view along the Wilkins' Room inside the Parker Library

The Parker Library on the Web project is a joint venture run by Corpus Christi College, Cambridge, Cambridge University Library and Stanford University Libraries in the United States of America. The main goal of the project is to digitise all of the medieval manuscripts in the Parker Library and to be the first project that seeks to make an entire library publicly accessible on the web. The project is funded by the Mellon Foundation.

The initial phase of the project began in the summer of 2003, when the first two manuscripts, MSS 16 and 26, were digitised. These images were available as an initial prototype. A feasibility study was conducted during the early months of 2005 and the main project began at the end of 2005. The images were made by Cambridge University Library imaging staff, working at Corpus Christi College. The project has digitised the 538 manuscripts described in M. R. James' Descriptive Catalogue of the Manuscripts in the Parker Library, Corpus Christi College (Cambridge University Press, 1912) creating a subscription-only interactive web application in which the manuscript page images can be used by scholars and students in the context of editions, translations and secondary sources. A very small number of these are printed books, mistakenly catalogued as manuscripts in the 18th century, and so were excluded. Additionally, there are a few manuscripts with paper pages which are badly damaged by moisture, or those with very fragile bindings, which at present cannot be successfully imaged in their totality. Exterior images were made of the present bindings of each manuscript. Additional information was drawn from the supplemental hand-list by Richard Vaughan and John Fines of 1960, and descriptive material provided by the Parker Library for any manuscripts acquired more recently.

Completed in 2010, the process involved the digitisation of more than 200,000 separate pages. A beta version, although incomplete and with some errors, is currently available free to all registered users.
