= Edmund Colles =

Member of the Parliament of England

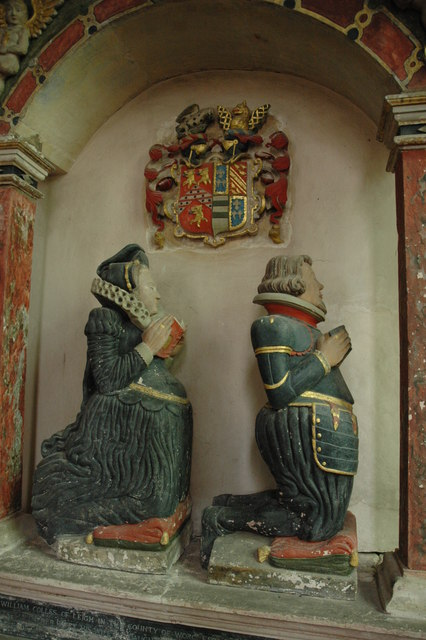
Monument to Edmond Colles, St Edburga's Church, Leigh, Worcestershire, with 12 children at the base. Arms of Colles: Gules, a cheveron argent barry of nine pelletée and gules between three lion's heads erased or

Edmund Colles (1528–1606) was an English landowner, administrator and legislator from Worcestershire who, although sympathetic to Catholicism, held public office throughout the reign of Queen Elizabeth I.

== Origins ==
The eldest son of William Colles (1495–1558) and his second wife Margaret Hitch (1495–1572), he received a legal education in London at the Inner Temple, being admitted a member in 1553. The Colles family had had minor landholdings in Worcestershire for generations, originally in the village of Suckley, and his father held the lease of the manor, advowson and demesne lands of the village of Leigh which before the Dissolution of the Monasteries had belonged to Pershore Abbey.

== Landholdings ==
In 1558 he inherited his father's holdings, to which he started adding, in 1564 gaining Colles Place which he claimed had belonged to his ancestors. In 1583 he settled the tenure of the manor of Leigh on his eldest son William on the occasion of his marriage to Mary Palmer (granddaughter of William Paget, 1st Baron Paget). By 1585 he had bought part of the demesne lands of Leigh and held the rest as a tenant of the Crown. In 1590 he obtained the whole manor and advowson of Leigh and in 1605 added the rest of the demesne lands together with the manor of Castle Leigh.

== Public career ==
Starting at county level, in 1564 he was appointed escheator for Worcestershire, being sent by the sheriff in 1585 to collect contributions from Catholic recusants to help the English forces fighting for the Protestant Dutch against Spain. By then he was sitting as a justice of the peace for the county and in both 1574 and 1590 served as sheriff, becoming later a deputy lieutenant. On a regional level, he was one of three arbitrators chosen in 1587 by the Privy Council to adjudicate on the disputes between Sylvanus Scory and the Bishop of Hereford and in 1602 he was made a member of the Council of Wales and the Marches. Finally, on a national level, he was returned to the 1597 Parliament as one of the two members for the county at the age of 69. The sheriff at the time, Edmund Harewell, was his neighbour and the husband of his daughter Susan. Among committees he probably attended were those on enclosures, poor relief, penal laws against Catholics, letters patent granting monopolies, and taxation.

== Marriage and children ==
He married twice:

- Firstly to Jane Somerville, widow of Henry Blount of Bewdley and daughter of Robert Somerville of Wooton Wawen by his wife Mary Greville, sister of Sir John Greville. By Jane he had children including:
  - William Colles, eldest son and heir, who married Mary Palmer a granddaughter of William Paget, 1st Baron Paget.
  - Jane Colles.
- Secondly he married Alice Townshend (d.1607), widow of Humphrey Archer of Tanworth-in-Arden and a daughter of Sir Robert Townshend of Ludlow by his wife Alice Poppey. After his death his widow returned to Ludlow. By Alice he had children including:
  - Edward Colles;
  - Richard Colles;
  - Thomas Colles;
  - Susan Colles.

== Death and legacy ==
He made his will on 12 October 1606 with a codicil on 14 December 1606 and died on 19 December 1606 at Leigh, where he was buried in St Edburga's church and his monument was later put up. The will was proved by his heir William on 12 May 1607. The lands he had inherited and expanded were however charged with debts, which had mounted up with interest, so that William had to hand them all over to trustees, who after his death in 1615 sold them to Sir Walter Devereux in 1617. William's son Edmund already had been declared a recusant in 1609.
