= Christopher Holywood =

Irish Jesuit

Christopher Holywood, SJ (1559 – 4 September 1626) was an Irish Jesuit of the Counter Reformation. The origin of the Nag's Head Fable has been traced to him.

== Roman Catholic and Irish ==
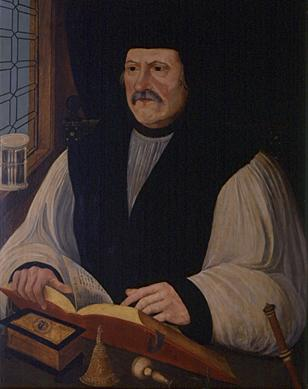
Matthew Parker, whose consecration Holywood claimed was invalid.

His family, which draws its name from Holywood, a village near Dublin, had long been distinguished both in Church and State. Christopher Holywood studied at Padua, entered the Society of Jesus at Dôle in 1579, was afterwards professor of Scripture and theology at Pont-a-Mousson, Ferrara, and Padua, and there met St Robert Bellarmine. In 1598 he was sent to Ireland, but was arrested on his way and confined in the Gatehouse Prison, the Tower of London and Wisbech Castle, and was eventually shipped to the continent after the death of Queen Elizabeth. He then resumed his interrupted journey and reached Ireland on St. Patrick's Eve, 1604. This same year he published two Latin works attacking the Church of England. One of which included the first allegation of an indecent consecration of archbishop of Canterbury Matthew Parker. This became known as the Nag's Head Fable and the story was not discredited in the eyes of some Roman Catholics for centuries. He was soon appointed superior of the Jesuits in Ireland.

== Ireland under King James I ==
On the accession of King James I, there had been a reaction in favor of Catholicism, and if this was strong even in England, it was far stronger in Ireland, leading in some cases to the Jesuit occupation of the Church of Ireland properties. Father Holywood and his fellow Jesuits had their hands full of work. Though there were only four Jesuits in Ireland when he landed, their number rapidly increased, and there were forty-two when he died, besides sixty others in training or occupied in teaching on the continent. After the imposition of the Oath of Allegiance there followed a persecution. By the enforced education of their children as Anglicans, many noble and influential families converted, and the lands of Roman Catholics were freely given to settlers from England. Holywood continued to do his work. At Kilkenny, for instance, a school which lasted until Oliver Cromwell's time was begun in 1619. Five "residences", or bases for Jesuit Fathers, were established, from where missionaries were sent out. Holywood's last report is for the year 1624. He died on 4 September 1626, and was succeeded by Robert Nugent.

== Works ==
- Defensio decreti Tridentini et sententiæ Roberti Bellarmini, S. R. E. cardinalis, de authoritate Vulgatæ editionis Latinæ, adversus sectarios, mazime Whitakerum. In qua etiam fuse admodum refutatur error sectariorum de Scripturæ interprete et judice controversiarum. Authore Christophoro a Sacrobosco, Dubliniensi Societatis Jesu, olim sacræ theologiæ in alma academia Dolana professore. (1604), published at Antwerp, 8vo. Reissued 1619 with additions by the author.
- De investiganda vera ac visibili Christi ecclesia libellus. (1604) Antwerp, 8vo.

His works were replies to Dr. William Whitaker and other protestant controversialists.

== Other sources ==
- O'Sullivan-Beare, Philip, Historiæ Catholicæ Iberniæ Compendium 1621.
- Bibliotheca Scriptorum Society Jesu Rome, 1675
- Oliver, George (1845) Collections towards illustrating the biography of the Scotch, English, and Irish members of the Society of Jesus. London: Charles Dolman
- de Backer, Augustin Bibliothèque des écrivains de la Compagnie de Jésus ou Notices bibliographiques. 1858|
- Calendar of State Papers, Ireland 1874
- Ibernia Ignatianæ (1880)
- Henry Foley, Records of the English Province of the Society of Jesus, vii. (1882)
