= Elizabeth Nugent =

Irish noblewoman

Elizabeth Nugent (died 1645) was an Irish noblewoman from an Old English family, and a major patron of the Jesuit order in Ireland. Her marriage to Gerald FitzGerald gave her the title of Lady Kildare, and after his death she became known as the Dowager Countess of Kildare.

== Biography ==
Elizabeth Nugent was the daughter of Christopher Nugent, an Irish nobleman of Old English descent. Around 1600, Nugent married her first cousin, Gerald FitzGerald. The couple had one child, a son named Gerald, who died at the age of nine. FitzGerald himself died soon after, in 1612, leaving Nugent as the Dowager Countess.

After Fitzgerald's death, the question of Nugent's jointure came before James I. In 1616, he proposed that she should receive a third of the FitzGerald estate; in 1620 this was granted, subject to claims from Lettice Digby and her husband. Nugent therefore received five FitzGerald estates for the remainder of her life.

In 1629, Nugent attempted to arrange a marriage between George FitzGerald and a daughter of Randal MacDonnell. The match fell through after interference from Charles I, who was concerned about the prospect of FitzGerald marrying into a Catholic family.

Nugent died on 26 October 1645.

== Jesuit patronage ==
Nugent was a close friend of her cousin, Robert Nugent, the mission superior of the Jesuits in Ireland, and provided financial support for many of his endeavors. In 1627, she financed the building of a Jesuit novitiate on land she leased from Christ Church Cathedral. The novitiate was forced to shut down soon after, due to political strife, but in 1637 Nugent again offered funding to re-establish it. In gratitude, Mutio Vitelleschi, the superior general of the Jesuits, ordered all Jesuits to offer three Masses and three rosaries for Nugent's soul.

In 1634, Nugent invited Robert Nugent and his Jesuit companions to take up residence in one of her estates, Kilkea Castle. This became a headquarters of Jesuit operations in Ireland. Nugent also left a sizable bequest to the Jesuits upon her death.

Due to her extensive patronage of the Jesuit mission in Ireland, Nugent is often considered as a secondary founder of the mission. Robert Nugent described her as the mother of the Society of Jesus in Ireland.
