= Sylvanus Scory =

English courtier and politician

Sylvanus Scory (also Silvanus) (c. 1551 – 1617) was an English courtier and politician, known as a soldier, covert agent, and dissolute wit.

== Life ==
He was the son of John Scory, the bishop of Hereford. His father's patronage made him a prebendary of Hereford, 1565–9. According to John Aubrey his father "loved him so dearly that he fleeced the Church of Hereford to leave him a good estate". Despite his background, Scory adopted a form of Catholicism; he had had contact with Catholics during education abroad.

Scory fought in the Low Countries, a follower of Robert Dudley, 1st Earl of Leicester. He was acquainted with the diplomats Michel de Castelnau, and through him Bernardino de Mendoza; at the time of the laying of the Francis Throckmorton plot Scory was on the fringe of the conspiracy, was examined, and had Castelnau write to Francis Walsingham on his behalf. It came out that Scory as intermediary had arranged for Leicester to meet Mendoza at a dinner held by Customer Smythe. In a similar role, he had set up a meeting of Gaston de Spinola, envoy from Alexander Farnese, Duke of Parma in Flanders, with the queen. Scory was at the same time suspected as the author of the scurrilous Leycester's Commonwealth. He did know something of its circulation, to Henry Noel.

His father's death in 1585 involved Scory in a chancery case with the new bishop of Hereford. In 1587 the privy council asked Edmund Colles and others to settle the dispute. The History of Parliament calls Scory a "swindler".

Scory was on good terms with Sir Philip Sidney; but Sidney broke off the relationship in July 1583. He was favoured by Francis, Duke of Anjou, Queen Elizabeth's suitor; and became a patron of Ben Jonson He was a friend of Walter Raleigh and Lawrence Kemys; and a client of Henry Percy, 9th Earl of Northumberland.

Scory was Member of Parliament for Newtown, Hampshire, Isle of Wight in 1597. His court connections were influential here, and are presumed to have given him favour with George Carey, 2nd Baron Hunsdon as nominator.

Scory went to Simon Forman to have impotence treated in 1598. In 1615 he had extensive self-interested discussions with the king on the privileges of baronets. Dying in 1617, he was buried in St. Leonard's, Shoreditch. He had two sons.

== Notes ==
Attribution

This article incorporates text from a publication now in the public domain: "Scory, John". Dictionary of National Biography. London: Smith, Elder & Co. 1885–1900.
