= Parker Library on the Web =

Parker Library on the Web is a multi-year undertaking of Corpus Christi College, Cambridge, the Stanford University Libraries and the Cambridge University Library, to produce a high-resolution digital copy of every imageable page in the 538 manuscripts described in M. R. James' work Descriptive Catalogue of the Manuscripts in the Parker Library, Corpus Christi College (Cambridge University Press, 1912), along with manuscripts acquired after the James Catalogue was completed. From 2009 to January 2018, the results were placed on a subscription-only interactive web application in which the manuscript page images can be used by scholars and students in the context of editions, translations and secondary sources. With the launch of Parker on the Web 2.0 in January 2018, the site became available to the public.

The 538 items numbered and catalogued by James exist as 546 physical volumes. A very small number of these are printed books, mistakenly catalogued as manuscripts in the 18th century, and so were excluded. Additionally, there are a few manuscripts with paper pages which are badly damaged by moisture, or those with very fragile bindings, which at present cannot be successfully imaged in their totality. Exterior images were made of the present bindings of each manuscript.

The project is of major importance for creating and preserving quality images of unique materials.
