= Robert Nugent (Jesuit) =

Irish priest (1574–1652)

Robert Nugent (1574, Ballina, County Meath – 1652, Inishbofin, Connemara, County Galway) was a Catholic priest who served as mission superior of the Jesuit order in Ireland from 1627 until 1647. With the support of his cousin and close friend Lady Kildare, he expanded the Irish mission and established a number of Jesuit colleges.

During the Irish Confederate Wars, Nugent was active on the Catholic side of the conflict, including by providing political and financial support to Giovanni Battista Rinuccini, the papal nuncio. After a failed attempt to flee to France to escape the conflict, Nugent died in Ireland in 1652.

== Biography ==
=== Youth and education ===
Nugent was born on 20 July 1574, in Ballina, County Meath. His parents were Catherine Plunkett and Oliver Nugent; he was from an influential Old English family, a cousin of Christopher Nugent and related to Murrough O'Brien. As a teenager, he studied for the Catholic priesthood at the University of Douai, and was ordained on 22 September 1601. He entered the Society of Jesus in Tournai, Belgium on 2 October 1601. After completing the Jesuit novitiate, he studied theology at the Old University of Leuven.

=== Missionary in Ireland ===
Christopher Holywood, superior of the Irish Jesuits, took an interest in Nugent, writing to him as early as 1604. In correspondence with Claudio Acquaviva, Holywood asked for Nugent to be sent to Ireland upon the completion of his studies. Acquaviva agreed, and in 1609, Nugent traveled to Ireland to join the mission there. Under the Jesuits, etc. Act 1584, the Jesuit activities in Ireland were high treason, and the mission activities had to be conducted clandestinely. On Nugent's arrival, his books and writings were stopped by the authorities in Winchester, England, and a number of people involved in transporting them were questioned.

Nugent was stationed in Meath, where he found quick success in his missionary work. He traveled among the villages in the area, preaching, celebrating Mass, and hearing confessions. His sermons attracted hundreds of listeners, sometimes moving them to tears or outcry. He reconciled feuding members of his family, and locals began to bring him disputes to settle in large numbers, especially over issues regarding clandestine marriages. A number of nobles and politicians converted to Catholicism or reformed their lives through Nugent's influence.

Holywood was evidently grooming Nugent as a successor, and by 1611 had stationed him in Dublin. There he served as Holywood's personal assistant, in addition to his other pastoral duties. That year, Nugent wrote the annual report to Acquaviva, on behalf of a sick Holywood. Nugent took his final vows on 4 September 1618, and by 1626 Holywood had appointed Nugent as his socius.

=== Mission Superior of Ireland ===
Holywood, whose health had been declining since 1620, died on 4 September 1626, and Nugent officially succeeded him on 6 April 1627. Nugent's reputation among the other Irish Jesuits was mixed; they generally considered him a capable superior, but some were concerned that he favored his native Leinster over the other Irish provinces. There were also concerns about Nugent's relationship to his cousin, Lady Kildare.

Political conditions in Ireland appeared to be improving for Catholics, and, like other leading Catholics of his day, Nugent began to engage in religious activities more openly. He arranged for the construction of a chapel in Dublin in 1628, followed by housing for the Jesuits, who had previously been living clandestinely with friends and relatives. Lady Kildare contributed land leased from Christ Church Cathedral, where, under Nugent's direction, a college was built for the Jesuit novitiate. Nugent also established Jesuit colleges in Dublin, Drogheda, and Waterford, as well as a number of schools in various towns.

Mutio Vitelleschi, the Father General of the Jesuit order, disapproved of Nugent's changes. In letters to Nugent, he criticized the indulgent lifestyle of the Irish Jesuits, and cautioned Nugent against making the Jesuits so visible. In late 1629 and early 1630, Vitelleschi's concerns proved founded, as government harassment of Catholics increased and Jesuit housing in Cork and Dublin was seized. Nugent was forced to shut down the Irish novitiate.

In 1629, Jesuit controversialist Henry Fitzsimon returned from Belgium to Ireland, where he quickly became a source of frustration to Nugent. A 1632 attempt by Nugent and Vitelleschi to relocate Fitzsimon to Douai failed, and Nugent was forced to put up with Fitzsimon until the latter's death in 1643.

Around this time, Lady Kildare invited Nugent and his Jesuit companions to live with her in Kilkea Castle, an offer Nugent accepted. It was not until 1637 that the political situation improved enough for Nugent to again attempt to establish a novitiate. Vitelleschi approved the plan, and Lady Kildare agreed to fund it. The novitiate was built and Vitelleschi praised the results, but the lull lasted only a few years.

=== Irish Confederate Wars ===
In 1642, the Irish Confederate Wars forced the Jesuits to retreat to Kilkenny. On Vitelleschi's advice, Nugent avoided directly involving himself in the conflict, but his letters express strong sympathies for the Catholic side and appeal to the Pope for support. Nugent attended the 1642 synod at Kilkenny, and on 13 May he signed the Acts of the Congregation of Irish Clergy, pledging his support to the Irish Confederation.

In the course of the conflict, Jesuit missions in Cork, Drogheda, Cashel, and Dublin disbanded or were lost, and some Jesuits in Drogheda were imprisoned. In areas controlled by the Catholics, however, the Jesuits openly thrived, with flourishing missions in Kilkenny, Wexford, New Ross, Waterford, Clonmel, Limerick, and Galway. In 1644, Nugent established a printing press in Kilkenny to support the Catholic cause.

By 1645, the missions were struggling financially and short on priests, especially priests fluent in Irish. Carlo Sangrio, the new vicar general of the Society of Jesus, wrote to Nugent complaining that the reports from Ireland were few and far between. On 26 October, Lady Kildare died, a major personal blow to Nugent, and on 31 October Nugent wrote to Sangrio asking to be allowed to resign from his position.

That same October, Giovanni Battista Rinuccini, the new papal nuncio, arrived in Ireland. Rinuccini was poorly informed on the Irish political situation, but he quickly became fast friends with Nugent, even requesting to have Nugent become his assistant once a new mission superior was found. Nugent supported Rinuccini's political decisions, including providing financial support for the 1646 attack on Dublin.

Nugent's request to retire was officially granted in 1646, although he was not able to actually retire until 20 April 1647. After his retirement as superior, Nugent continued to work as a bursar for the Jesuit mission. When Kilkenny surrendered to Cromwell on 27 March 1650, Nugent fled to Galway, where on 28 January 1651 he was appointed vice-superior. In early 1652, however, his superiors ordered him to leave Ireland, concerned that he knew too much about the Irish missions and would endanger all the Jesuits if captured. Some time around March of 1652, Nugent left Galway, and around 11 April he boarded a ship for France. Bad weather, however, forced the ship to turn around, and a declining Nugent returned to Inishbofin. There, on 6 May 1652, he died.
