= John Scory =

English Dominican friar and bishop

The Right Reverend John Scory
- Bishop of Hereford
- Church: Church of England
- Diocese: Diocese of Hereford
- Elected: 1559
- Term ended: 1585 (death)
- Predecessor: Thomas Reynolds
- Successor: Herbert Westfaling
- Other posts: Bishop of Chichester (1552–1553); Bishop of Rochester (1551–1552)

Orders
- Consecration: 30 August 1551 by Thomas Cranmer

Personal details
- Died: 1585
- Denomination: Anglican
- Occupation: Writer

John Scory (died 1585) was an English Dominican friar who later became a bishop in the Church of England.

He was Bishop of Rochester from 1551 to 1552, and then translated to Bishop of Chichester from 1552 to 1553. He was deprived of this position on Queen Mary's accession, but returned to the Anglican episcopate under Elizabeth's reign as Bishop of Hereford from 1559 to 1585.

He participated in the Westminster Disputation of 1559.

== Life ==
He was a Norfolk man, who became a friar in the Dominicans' house at Cambridge about 1530, and was one of those who signed the surrender on its suppression in 1538. He proceeded B.D. in 1539. In 1541 he was one of the six preachers whom Thomas Cranmer appointed at Canterbury Cathedral. He was also one of Cranmer's chaplains.

Scory was accused for a sermon preached on Ascension day 1541, but nothing seems to have resulted. King Edward notes that when Joan Bocher was executed (2 May 1550) for heresy, Scory preached, and she reviled him, saying that he lied like a rogue and ought to read the Bible. He was about this time made examining chaplain to Nicholas Ridley, the bishop of London. In Lent 1551 he called attention to the want of ecclesiastical discipline, and to the covetousness of the rich, particularly in the matter of enclosures. He was appointed to the bishopric of Rochester on 26 April 1551, and was a commissioner appointed to revise the ecclesiastical laws (February 1551–2). On 23 May 1552 he was translated to Chichester.

On Mary's accession Scory was deprived, but submitted himself to Edmund Bonner, renounced his wife, did penance for being married, and, having recanted and been absolved, was allowed to officiate in the London diocese. He is also supposed to have circulated Cranmer's Declaration concerning the Mass. He soon, however, left England and went to Emden in Friesland, where he became superintendent of the English congregation. He also spent time at Wesel, then resided from 1556 at Geneva.

On Elizabeth's accession Scory returned to England. He preached before the queen in Lent 1559, took part in the Westminster disputation on 31 March 1559, and on 15 July 1559 became bishop of Hereford, one of the first bishops nominated by Elizabeth. When Henry III of France died, Scory preached at the solemn service held at St Paul's Cathedral on 8 September 1559. He also assisted at Matthew Parker's consecration, and preached the sermon on 17 December 1559.

As diocesan bishop at Hereford Scory had troubles. He wrote to Parker describing the condition of his diocese, which contained many chapels either unserved or served with a reader only; some of the parish churches were in danger, owing to an interpretation of the statute for the suppression of colleges. He also was bothered by the proceedings of the Council of Wales and the Marches, and had difficulties with the cathedral clergy; but he obtained new statutes for the cathedral in 1582. He was accused of being a money-lender. John Aubrey says that he loved his son Sylvanus Scory "so dearly that he fleeced the Church of Hereford to leave him a good estate". He instituted a thorough review of the lands of the bishopric which was carried out 1577–80 by the young Swithun Butterfield.

In dogma Scory was orthodox, and signed the articles of 1562, and the canons of 1571. He died at Whitbourne, Herefordshire on 26 June 1585. He left money to charitable uses.

== Works ==
- Epistle to the Faytheful in Pryson in England, written during his exile at Emden.
- Certein Works of the blessed Cipriane the Martyr, London, 1556.
- Two Books of the noble doctor and B. S. Augustine, translated into English, 8vo, between 1550 and 1560.

A survey of the lands belonging to the see of Hereford was made in 1577–8 by Swithun Butterfield under Scory's direction, and has been preserved.

== Family ==
Scory's wife Elizabeth survived till 8 March 1592. A son Sylvanus Scory was prebendary of Hereford 1565–9, fought in the Low Countries, was M.P. for Newtown, Hampshire in 1597, and, dying in 1617, was buried in St Leonard's, Shoreditch. He left one son, Sylvanus, who died a prisoner in Wood Street counter in 1641, and another son, Edmund, knighted on 4 July 1618.

Church of England titles
Preceded by John Ponet	Bishop of Rochester; 1551–1552	Succeeded by Maurice Griffith
Preceded by George Day	Bishop of Chichester; 1552–1553	Succeeded by George Day
Preceded by Thomas Reynolds	Bishop of Hereford; 1559–1585	Succeeded by Herbert Westfaling
