= List of Old Norvicensians =

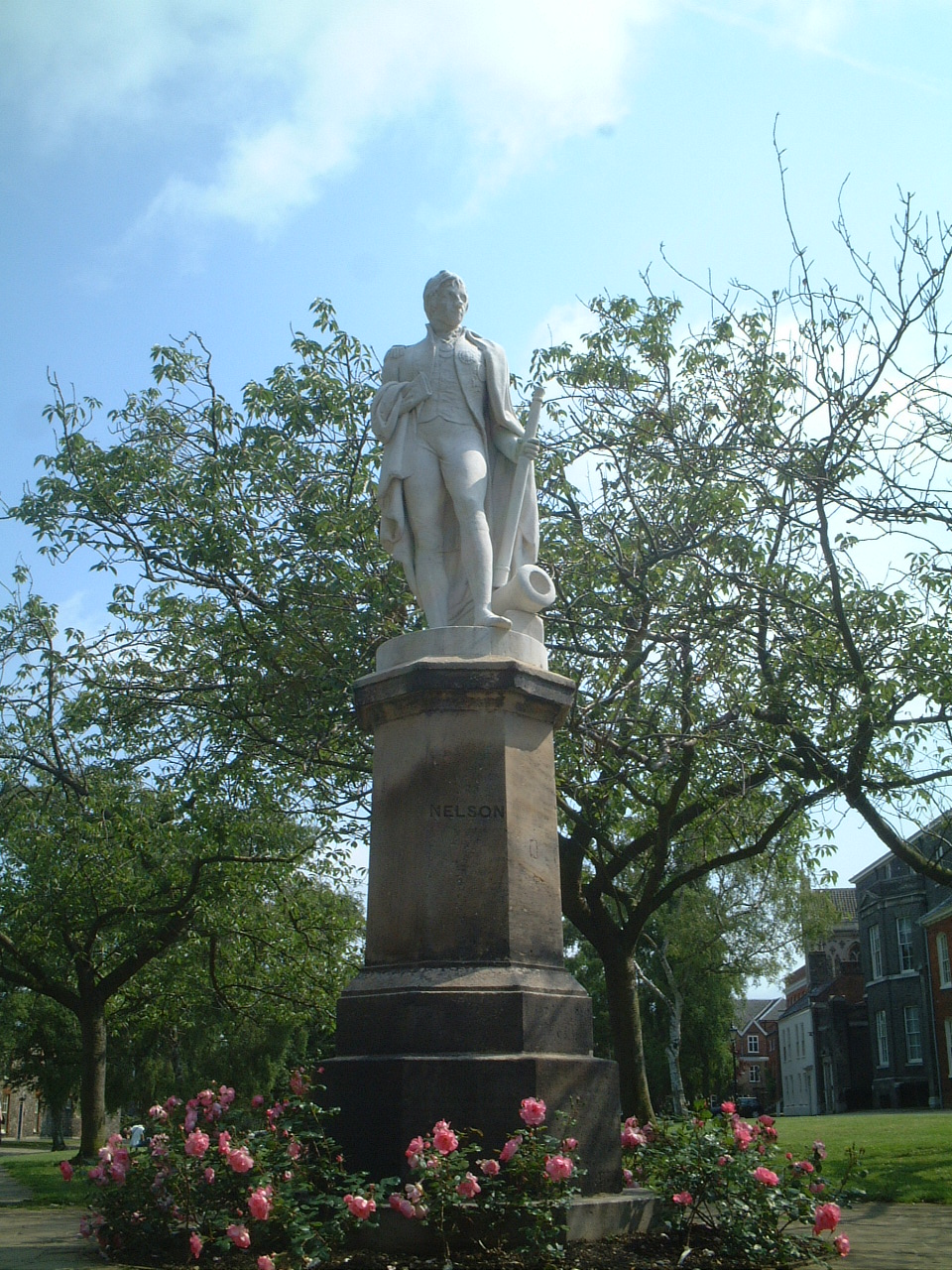
Statue of Lord Nelson in the Upper Close

Old Norvicensians (ONs) are former pupils of Norwich School, an independent co-educational day public school in Norwich, England. It was founded in 1096 as an episcopal school by the first Bishop of Norwich, Herbert de Losinga, and is one of the longest surviving schools in the United Kingdom. It was refounded by royal charter in 1547 by Edward VI. ONs may join the Old Norvicensian Club of former pupils. Predecessors include the Parrian Club, a dining society for former pupils of Samuel Parr's headship in the late 18th century, and the Valpeian Club, after Edward Valpy in the early 19th century. In 1866, the latter gave way to the Norwich School Club, which became the current association for former pupils at the beginning of the 20th century.

== Academia ==
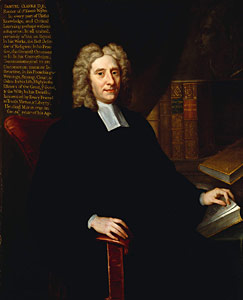
Samuel Clarke

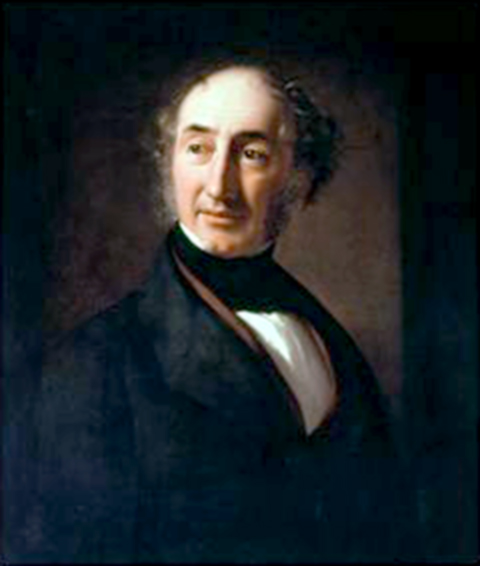
Sir William Jackson Hooker

- Christopher Andrew, historian
- William Lawrence Balls FRS, botanist
- Reyner Banham, architectural historian
- Robert Blake, Baron Blake, historian and life peer
- Henry Bond, physician and Regius Professor of Physic, Cambridge University
- William Briggs, physician and oculist
- Edward Browne FRS, physician and president of the Royal College of Physicians
- Sir Edward Bullard FRS, geophysicist
- John Caius, founder of Gonville and Caius College, Cambridge
- E. W. W. Carlier, histologist
- Professor Dr Tom Cavalier-Smith, FRS, FRSC, FRSA, FIBiol, evolutionary biologist
- Samuel Clarke FRS, philosopher
- Sydney Copeman FRS, medical scientist responsible for improvements in the smallpox vaccination
- William Dalrymple, surgeon noted for the successful tying the carotid artery
- Martin Davy FRS, Master of Caius College, Cambridge
- Joe Farman CBE, geophysicist, co-discover of the Antarctic ozone hole
- Sir William Jackson Hooker FRS, botanist and Director of the Royal Botanic Gardens, Kew
- Sir Owen Wansbrough-Jones, chemist and scientific adviser to government
- Mark A. Lemmon FRS, biochemist, biophysicist, and cancer biologist at Yale University
- John Lindley FRS, botanist, gardener and orchidologist
- Roger Long FRS, astronomer
- James MacKeith OBE, forensic psychiatrist who played a major part in the successful appeals of the Guildford Four and Birmingham Six
- John Quelch, professor at Harvard Business School
- Oliver Rackham OBE, botanist and an authority on the British countryside
- Edward Rigby, physician
- John Smith, astronomer
- Sir Richard V. Southwell FRS, aeronautical engineer and rector of Imperial College London
- Alfred Stephenson OBE, polar surveyor and explorer
- Benjamin Stillingfleet, botanist and writer
- Henry Wild, orientalist
- Henry Woodward FRS, geologist

== Artists ==
Several members of the Norwich School of painters were educated at Norwich School and taught by John Crome when he was drawing master.

- John Sell Cotman, leading member of the Norwich School of painters
- John Berney Crome, member of the Norwich School of painters, son of John Crome
- Edward Thomas Daniell, member of the Norwich School of painters
- Hugh Welch Diamond, photographer
- Frederick Sandys, Pre-Raphaelite painter
- Edward Seago, Post-Impressionist painter
- James Stark, member of the Norwich School of painters
- George Vincent, member of the Norwich School of painters

== Athletes ==
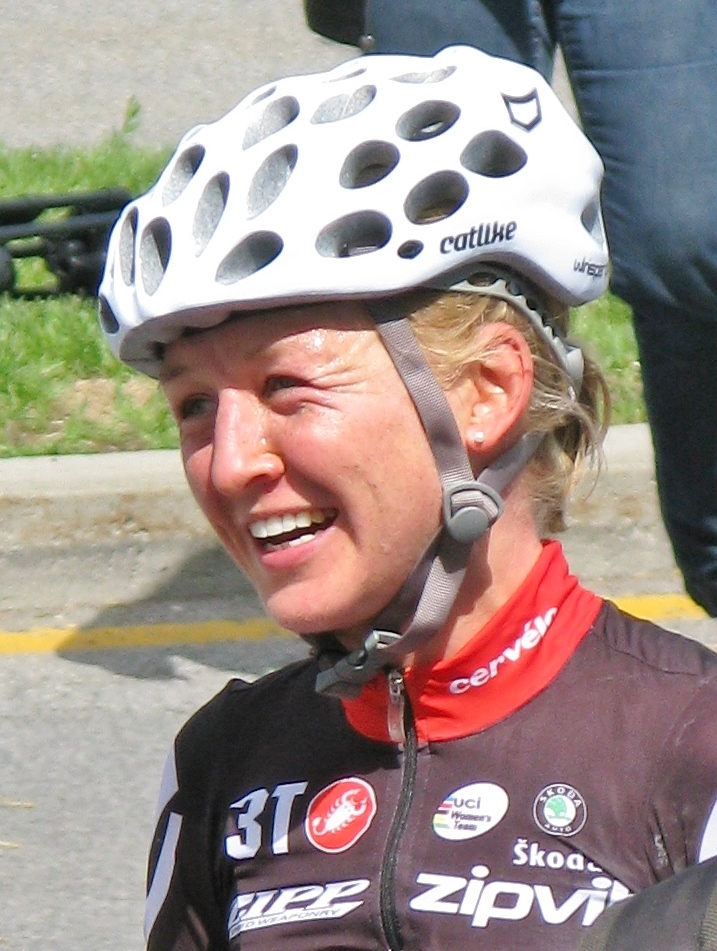
Emma Pooley

- Tom Adeyemi, footballer
- Emma Pooley, Olympic cyclist
- Clive Radley MBE, cricketer and former head coach of MCC
- Stuart Cowie, professional squash player
- Geoffrey Stevens, cricketer
- Freddie Steward, rugby union player
- George Catchpole, rugby union player

== Business ==
- Steffan Aquarone, entrepreneur and film producer
- Peter Kindersley, chairman of the publishing company Dorling Kindersley (DK) and Bafta award winner
- Sir John Quinton, chairman of Barclays Bank and the first chairman of the FA Premier League
- Richard Twining FRS (1772–1857), tea merchant and chairman of the committee of by-laws at East India House

== Clergy ==
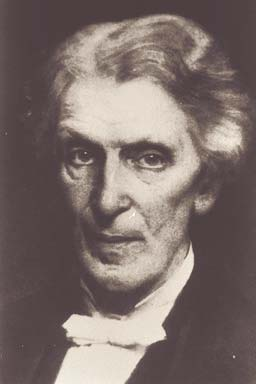
James Martineau

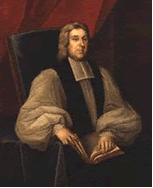
Thomas Tenison

- Thomas Ainger, clergyman
- Theophilus Brabourne, clergyman and writer
- Nicholas Clagett the Younger, controversialist
- John Clarke, Dean of Salisbury and mathematician
- John Cosin, Bishop of Durham
- Richard Charles Coxe, canon of Durham
- Richard Fletcher, Bishop of Worcester (1593–1594) and Bishop of London (1595–1596)
- Thomas Green, Bishop of Ely and Norwich, vice-chancellor of Cambridge University
- John Groome, clergyman
- Robert Hindes Groome, archdeacon of Suffolk
- Thomas Gumble, clergyman and biographer
- Henry Kett, clergyman and scholar
- Edward Maltby FRS, Bishop of Durham
- James Henry Monk, Bishop of Gloucester and Bristol and classical scholar
- James Martineau, Unitarian philosopher
- Charles Moss FRS, Bishop of St David's and Bishop of Bath and Wells
- Robert Moss, Dean of Ely
- Dudley Narborough, Bishop of Colchester
- John Perowne, Bishop of Worcester
- William Purcell, Archdeacon of Dorking
- John Gooch Robberds, Unitarian minister
- John Stoughton, Congregational minister
- Thomas Tenison, Archbishop of Canterbury 1694 to 1715
- Edward Walpole, Jesuit preacher
- Henry Walpole, Jesuit martyr, one of the Forty Martyrs of England and Wales
- Michael Walpole, Jesuit
- Cecil Wilfred Wilson, Bishop of Middleton

== Law ==
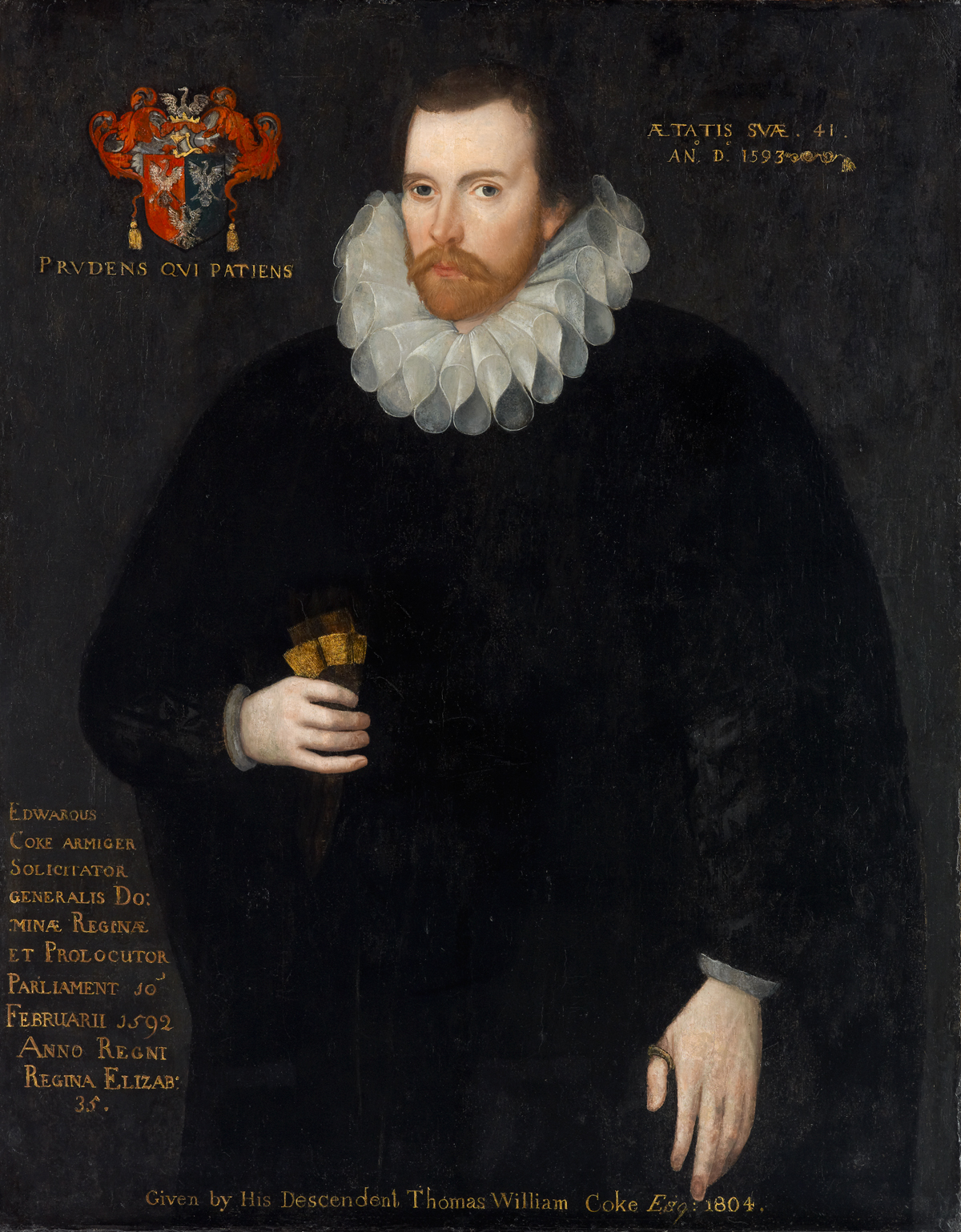
Sir Edward Coke

- Sir Richard Aikens, Lord Justice of Appeal
- Sir Henry Bedingfield, Chief Justice of the Common Pleas
- Sir Edward Coke, Elizabethan and Jacobean jurist, judge, and politician
- Erasmus Earle, serjeant-at-law to Oliver Cromwell
- Sir Forrest Fulton, Conservative MP, Common Serjeant, and Recorder of London
- Sir Thomas Richardson, Speaker of the House of Commons, later Chief Justice of the Common Pleas and Chief Justice of the King's Bench
- Sir Edward Stracey, Counsel to the Chairman of the Lords Committees
- Lord Wilberforce, law lord
- Sir Ernest Wild, judge and Conservative MP

== Literature ==
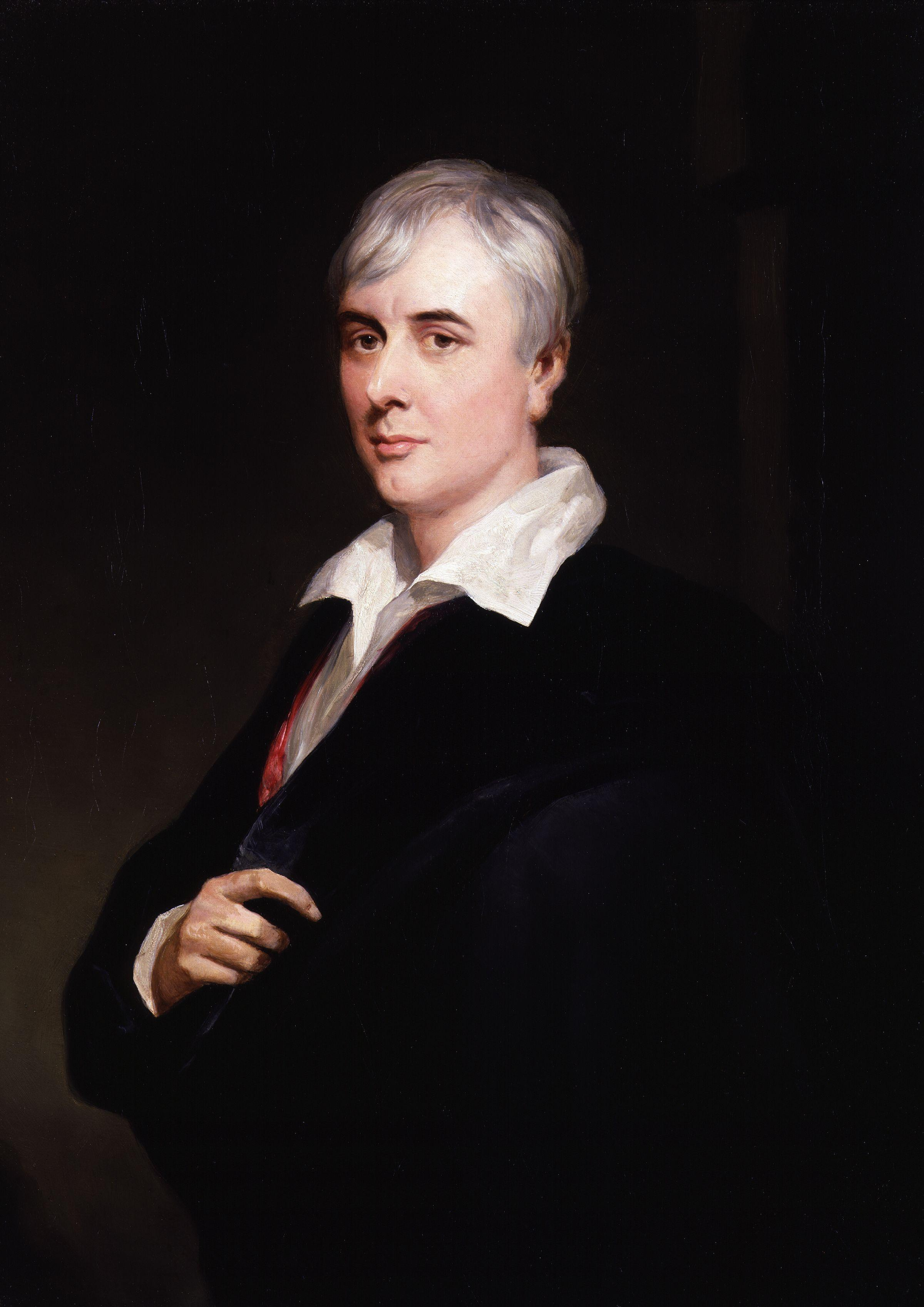
George Borrow

- Robert Baron, poet and playwright
- George Borrow, author
- John Brereton, chronicler
- Edward Forster FRS, writer
- Robert Greene, poet, novelist and critic of Shakespeare
- Henry Kett, educator and writer
- Henry William Massingham, journalist and editor of The Nation
- Thomas Monro, writer
- Richard K. Morgan, acclaimed author of science fiction and fantasy novels
- Thomas Starling Norgate, writer, journalist and newspaper editor
- Henry Reeve, journalist and translator of Alexis de Tocqueville's Democracy in America
- D. J. Taylor, critic, novelist and biographer

== Media ==
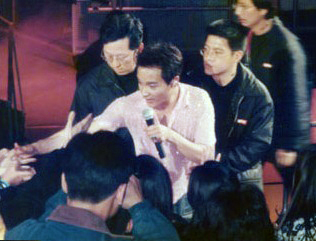
Leslie Cheung

- Leslie Cheung, Hong Kong singer-songwriter and actor
- Simon Cook, actor and politician
- Becky Mantin, model and television presenter
- Peter Kennerley, TV journalist & documentary maker
- Paul Spurrier, actor
- Tim Westwood, BBC Radio 1 DJ 1994 to 2013

== Military ==
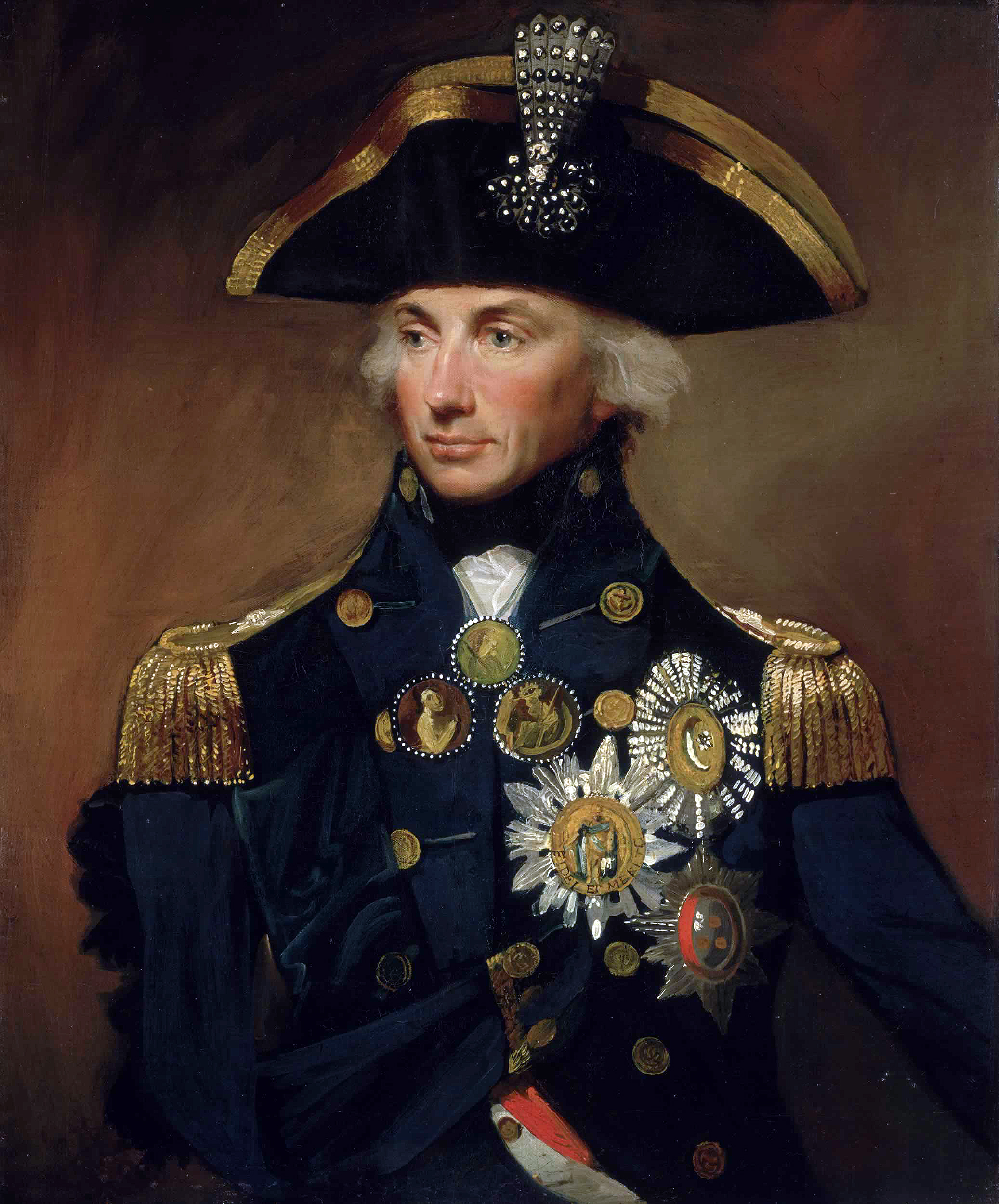
Horatio Nelson, 1st Viscount Nelson

- Major Alexis Charles Doxat VC
- Sir Vincent Eyre, army officer in the East India Company
- Philip F. Fullard, First World War flying ace
- Horatio Nelson, 1st Viscount Nelson
- Lt Col Derek Seagrim VC
- Major Hugh Seagrim GC
- Major General Greg Smith, Assistant Chief of the Defence Staff (Reserves and Cadets)
- Col John Manners Smith VC
- Lt Col Charles Stoddart, army officer and diplomat
- Sir Archdale Wilson, commander in the Siege of Delhi

== Politicians and civil servants ==
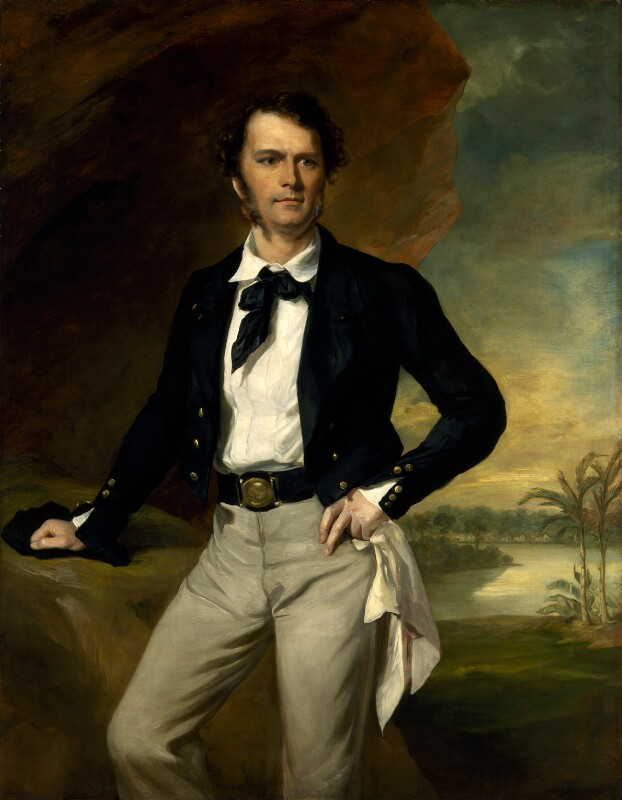
Sir James Brooke

- Michael Ashcroft, Baron Ashcroft, former Deputy Chairman of the Conservative Party
- Sir Jacob Astley, 1st Baronet, High Sheriff of Norfolk and Conservative MP
- Sir James Brooke, Rajah of Sarawak
- Richard Harman, MP for Norwich in the Long Parliament
- John Ives FRS, antiquarian and officer of arms
- Christopher Layer, Jacobite conspirator
- Charles Marsh, MP and barrister
- Sir Robert Naunton, MP and Secretary of State
- Arthur Samuel, 1st Baron Mancroft, Conservative politician
- Sir Oliver St John, chief commissioner of Baluchistan
- Sir Graham Savage, educational administrator
- Arthur Christopher Watson, British High Commissioner to Brunei

== Miscellaneous ==
- Vernon William Blythe, stage name Vernon Castle, ballroom dancer
- Kit Downes, jazz pianist
- Peter le Neve Foster, secretary to the Royal Society of Arts
- Humphry Repton, landscape gardener
- George H. Widdows, architect of over 70 schools in Derbyshire
- William Wilkins FRS, Greek Revivalist architect of the National Gallery among others

== Wrongly identified as alumni ==
- Matthew Parker, Archbishop of Canterbury 1559 to 1575 is incorrectly identified in Bayne's A Comprehensive History of Norwich (1869) as attending the school. The confusion may have arisen out of Parker's role as a benefactor of a number of scholarships at Corpus Christi College, Cambridge to the school and the city of Norwich.
