= Henry Stebbing (editor) =

English cleric and man of letters

Henry Stebbing FRS (1799–1883) was an English cleric and man of letters, known as a poet, preacher, and historian. He worked as a literary editor, of books and periodicals.

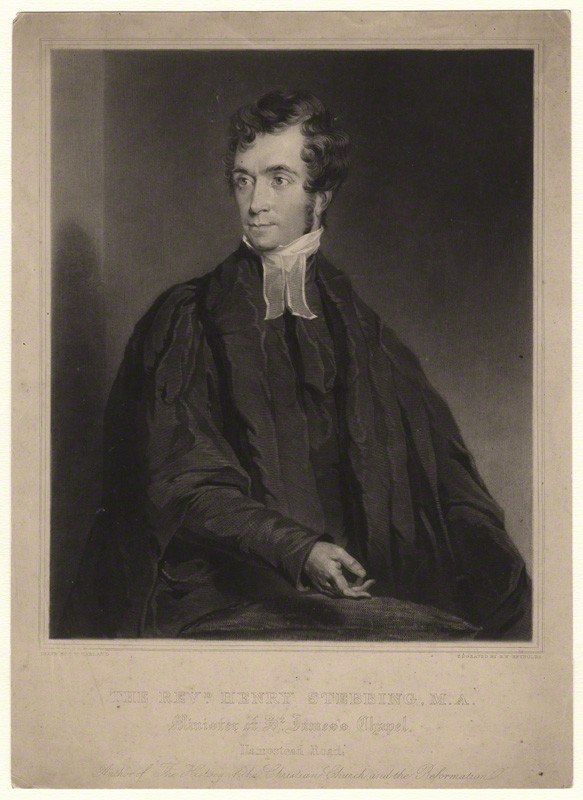
Henry Stebbing, 1830s engraving

== Life ==
Born at Great Yarmouth, Norfolk, on 26 August 1799, he was the son of John Stebbing (died 11 December 1826), who married Mary Rede (died 24 May 1843) of a Suffolk family. In October 1818 he went to St. John's College, Cambridge, where he had been admitted a sizar on 4 July 1818. He graduated B.A. 1823, M.A. 1827, and D.D. 1839, and on 3 July 1857 was admitted ad eundem at Oxford. On 3 April 1845 he was elected Fellow of the Royal Society.

Stebbing was ordained deacon by Henry Bathurst, the bishop of Norwich in 1822, and priest in 1823. Within a few months he was in charge of three parishes for absentee incumbents, and rode forty miles each Sunday to do the duty. In 1825 he was appointed evening lecturer at St. Mary's, Bungay, and about 1824 he became perpetual curate of Ilketshall St. Lawrence, Norfolk.

Stebbing became, in January 1826, second master, under Edward Valpy of Norwich grammar school; Henry Reeve was one of his pupils there. In 1827 he moved to London, and was soon working for the booksellers, combining writing with clerical work. From 1829 he was alternate morning preacher, and from 1836 to 1857 perpetual curate, of St. James, Hampstead Road, London. He officiated during the same period at the large cemetery of St. James, Piccadilly, which was situated behind his church, and from 1834 to December 1879 he acted as chaplain to University College hospital. For a few months, from 21 November 1835 to the following spring, he held, on the presentation of John Norris, the vicarage of Hughenden Manor in Buckinghamshire. In 1841 he was chaplain to the Lord Mayor of London, Thomas Johnson.

In 1857 Archibald Campbell Tait, then bishop of London, gave Stebbing the rectory of St. Mary Somerset, with St. Mary Mounthaw in the city of London. Under the Union of Benefices Act, the parishes of St. Nicholas Cole-Abbey and St. Nicholas Olave were united with them in November 1866, and those of St. Benet and St. Peter, Paul's Wharf, in June 1879. He held the composite living for the rest of his life.

Stebbing died at St. James's parsonage, Hampstead Road, London, on 22 September 1883, and was buried on 27 September in Kensal Green Cemetery, London.

== Works ==
Stebbing's first poem, The Wanderers, was printed at the end of 1817 and circulated to friends. In August 1818 he published Minstrel of the Glen and other Poems. After his marriage he wrote for money.

== Periodicals ==
Stebbing was connected with the Athenæum magazine from its foundation. He was engaged by James Silk Buckingham in its early planning. A notice by him of Renn Hampden work on Butler's Analogy, or Philosophical Evidences of Christianity was the opening review in the first number of 2 January 1828, and his article on Richard Whately's Rhetoric led the second number. After three or four issues he became the working editor.

A moderate churchman, inclining to evangelicalism, in 1847 Stebbing published A Letter to Lord John Russell on the Established Church, in which he argued for a reform of the system of patronage. In 1848 he owned and edited the Christian Enquirer and the Literary Companion, of which seven issues were published.

== Books ==
Stebbing's major works were:

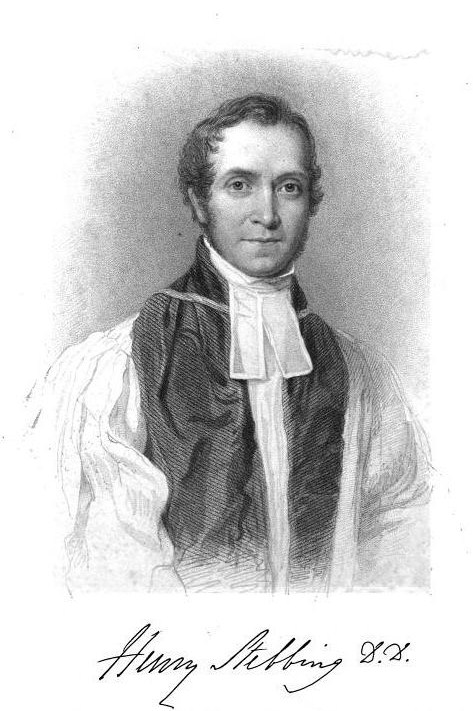
Henry Stebbing, 1845

- History of Chivalry and the Crusades in Constable's Miscellany, vols. l. and li., 1830; praised by Christopher North.
- Lives of the Italian Poets, 1831, 3 vols.; 2nd edit. with numerous additions, 1832, 3 vols.; new edition in one volume, with omissions and alterations, 1860.
- History of the Christian Church in Lardner's Cabinet Cyclopædia, 1833, 2 vols.
- History of the Reformation in Lardner's Cabinet Cyclopædia, 1836, 2 vols.
- History of Church of Christ from Diet of Augsburg, 1530, to the Eighteenth Century; originally intended as a continuation of Joseph Milner's History, 1842, 3 vols.
- The Church and its Ministers, 1844.
- History of the Universal Church in Primitive Times, 1845.
- The Christian in Palestine, or Scenes of Sacred History; to illustrate sketches on the spot by William Henry Bartlett, 1847.
- Short Readings on Subjects for Long Reflection, 1849.
- History of Christ's Universal Church prior to the Reformation, 1850, 2 vols.
- The long Railway Journey and other Poems, 1851.
- Jesus: a poem in six Books, 1851.
- Christian Graces in Olden Time: Poetical Illustrations, 1852.
- Near the Cloisters, 1868, 2 vols.; description of life in Norwich early in the 19th century.

He wrote a continuation to the Death of William IV, of David Hume and Tobias Smollett's History of England. His Essay on the Study of History, which appeared as an addition to Hume, was published separately in 1841.

=== Editor ===
From 1834 to 1836 Stebbing edited, with Richard Cattermole, thirty volumes of the Sacred Classics of England. He was editor of the Diamond Bible (1834, 1840, and 1857), Diamond New Testament (1835), Charles Knight's Pictorial Edition of the Book of Common Prayer (1838–1840), Tate and Brady's Psalms (1840), Psalms and Hymns, with some original Hymns (1841), and many modern theological works. He also edited the works of Josephus (1842) and of John Bunyan, John Milton's Poems (1839 and 1851), and Daniel Defoe's Journal of the Plague Year (1830), and Robinson Crusoe (1859).

=== Literary circles ===
Stebbing knew many literary figures. He breakfasted with Samuel Rogers, and was introduced by Basil Montagu to Coleridge's set at Highgate. He conversed with Walter Scott, corresponded with Robert Southey, heard Thomas Moore sing his Irish ballads, and knew Thomas Campbell and Charles Dickens.

== Family ==
Stebbing married, at Catton church, near Norwich, on 21 December 1824, Mary, daughter of William Griffin of Norwich, and sister of Vice-admiral William Griffin. His wife (born at Norwich on 22 February 1805) died on 3 February 1882, and was buried in the same cemetery. Five sons and four daughters survived. His sons included William Stebbing and Thomas Roscoe Rede Stebbing; and two daughters, Beatrice Batty and Grace Stebbing, were known as authors. The eldest son, John (died 1885), translated Wilhelm Humboldt's Letters to a Lady and Adolphe Thiers's History of France under Napoleon.

== Notes ==
Attribution

This article incorporates text from a publication now in the public domain: Lee, Sidney, ed. (1898). "Stebbing, Henry (1799-1883)". Dictionary of National Biography. Vol. 54. London: Smith, Elder & Co.
