= Ainger =

Ainger may refer to:

- Ainger, Michigan, a settlement in Walton Township, Michigan, USA
- Alfred Ainger (1837–1904), English biographer and critic
- Arthur Campbell Ainger (1841–1919), English Christian hymn writer
- Nick Ainger (born 1949), British Labour Member of Parliament
- Thomas Ainger (1799–1863), English clergyman
