= Beatrice Batty =

- Born: Beatrice Stebbing; 30 August 1833; London, England
- Died: 30 April 1933 (aged 99); Reading, Berkshire
- Other names: Beatrice Braithwaite Batty
- Known for: Traveller and author

Beatrice Stebbing Batty (30 August 1833 – 30 April 1933) was an English writer and author of ten novels.

== Personal life ==
She was born in London, and was the eldest daughter of Henry Stebbing, an English cleric and literary editor, and Mary Griffith Stebbing. Her siblings included journalist William Stebbing, zoologist Thomas R. R. Stebbing, and novelist Grace Stebbing.

Batty was educated at a Moravian boarding school in Neuwied, Rhineland in west Germany. Her experiences there formed the basis for her first book, An English Girl's Account of a Moravian Settlement, which was published in 1858.

In 1860 she married Robert Braithwaite Batty, and they went to India to do missionary work. He died of dysentery and she returned to England.

== Writing career ==
Batty wrote at least ten novels, and was editor-in-chief of Coral magazine. She carried on a longtime personal correspondence with John Horden, the first Anglican Bishop of Moosonee, Canada, and in 1893 she published a book of extracts from his letters and papers called Forty-Two Years Amongst the Indians and Eskimo; Pictures from the Life of the Right Reverend John Horden, First Bishop of Moosonee.

From 1892 she lived in Oxford. Batty was a "'fervent attender of societies" and was a member of the Oxford University Anthropology Society. Batty gave much of her collection from her travels to the Pitt Rivers Museum and Reading Museum and her papers to the Bodleian Library.

Batty died on 30 April 1933, whilst living in Reading.
