= Thomas Starling Norgate =

English writer, journalist and newspaper editor

Thomas Starling Norgate (20 August 1772 – 7 July 1859) was an English writer, journalist and newspaper editor.

== Life ==
The son of Elias Norgate, a surgeon, and Deborah, daughter of Alderman Thomas Starling, he was born at Norwich, on 20 August 1772. From 1780 to 1788 he attended Norwich Grammar School, under Samuel Parr as headmaster until 1785. In 1789 he was sent to Hackney New College, and then entered at Lincoln's Inn. Although he kept his terms there, he gave up on a legal career, and returned to Norwich without plans.

Norgate became involved in periodical writing, through a number of personal contacts. In 1829 he founded the Norfolk and Norwich Horticultural Society. In 1830 he, with Simon Wilkin and another friend, established the East-Anglian, a weekly newspaper published at Norwich (1830–33).

Norgate died at Hetherset, 7 July 1859, in his 87th year.

== Works ==
While in London Norgate knew William Beloe, and then contributed to an early volume of the British Critic. A year or two later, William Enfield invited him to write for the minister at the Octagon Chapel in Norwich, he became a regular contributor to the Analytical Review, which he did until it closed down in 1799; and he supplied a few papers to The Cabinet, a Norwich periodical published (1794–5) by Charles Marsh, William Taylor, and others. He was a writer on various topics in the Monthly Magazine, and supplied the Half-yearly Retrospect of Domestic Literature from 1797 to 1807, when the publication was discontinued. To Arthur Aikin's Annual Review (1803–8) Norgate was a major contributor. His close friend William Taylor introduced him to Ralph Griffiths, the editor of the Monthly Review, for which he wrote for a time while living in retirement on his estate at Hetherset in Norfolk.

In 1829 Norgate wrote the introductory chapter on the Agriculture of the County for John Chambers's General History of Norfolk.

== Family ==
Norgate's eldest son Elias assisted him as editor, and with the Horticultural Society. His fourth son, Thomas Starling Norgate (1807–1893), born 30 December 1807, was educated at Norwich grammar school under Edward Valpy, and graduated B.A. from Gonville and Caius College, Cambridge, in 1832. He was curate successively of Briningham, of Cley-next-the-Sea, and of Banningham, all in Norfolk, and was collated rector of Sparham in 1840. He died there on 25 November 1893. He was the author of three volumes of blank-verse translations of the Homeric poems: Batrachomyomachia, an Homeric fable reproduced in dramatic blank verse, 1863; The Odyssey in dramatic blank verse 1863; and The Iliad, 1864. His granddaughter was the historian Kate Norgate.

== Notes ==
Attribution

This article incorporates text from a publication now in the public domain: Lee, Sidney, ed. (1895). "Norgate, Thomas Starling". Dictionary of National Biography. Vol. 41. London: Smith, Elder & Co.
