= John Groome =

John Groome may refer to:

- John Groome (divine)
- John Charles Groome (Maryland)
- John Charles Groome (Pennsylvania)

== See also ==
- Groome
