= Le Neve =

Le Neve is a Breton surname. Historically most prevalent in Morbihan. People with that name include:

- Clement le Neve Foster (1841–1904), English geologist and mineralogist
- Ethel Le Neve (1883–1967), mistress of the murderer Dr. Hawley Harvey Crippen
- John Le Neve (1679–1741), English antiquary
- Mélissa Le Nevé (born 1989), French professional rock climber
- Oliver Le Neve (1662–1711), Norfolk country squire, landowning sportsman, and duellist
- Peter Le Neve (1661–1729), English herald and antiquary
- Peter le Neve Foster (1809–1879), English barrister and mathematician
- William Le Neve (1600? – 1661), English herald and genealogist
