= Geoffrey Stevens =

Geoffrey Stevens may refer to:

- Geoffrey Stevens (British politician) (1902–1981), English chartered accountant and politician
- Geoffrey Stevens (journalist) (born 1942), Canadian journalist, author and educator
- Geoffrey W. Stevens (1891–1963), Canadian politician in the Nova Scotia House of Assembly
- Geoffrey Stevens (cricketer) (1890–1963), English cricketer
- Geoff Stevens, South African sailor
