= Peter le Neve Foster =

English barrister and mathematician

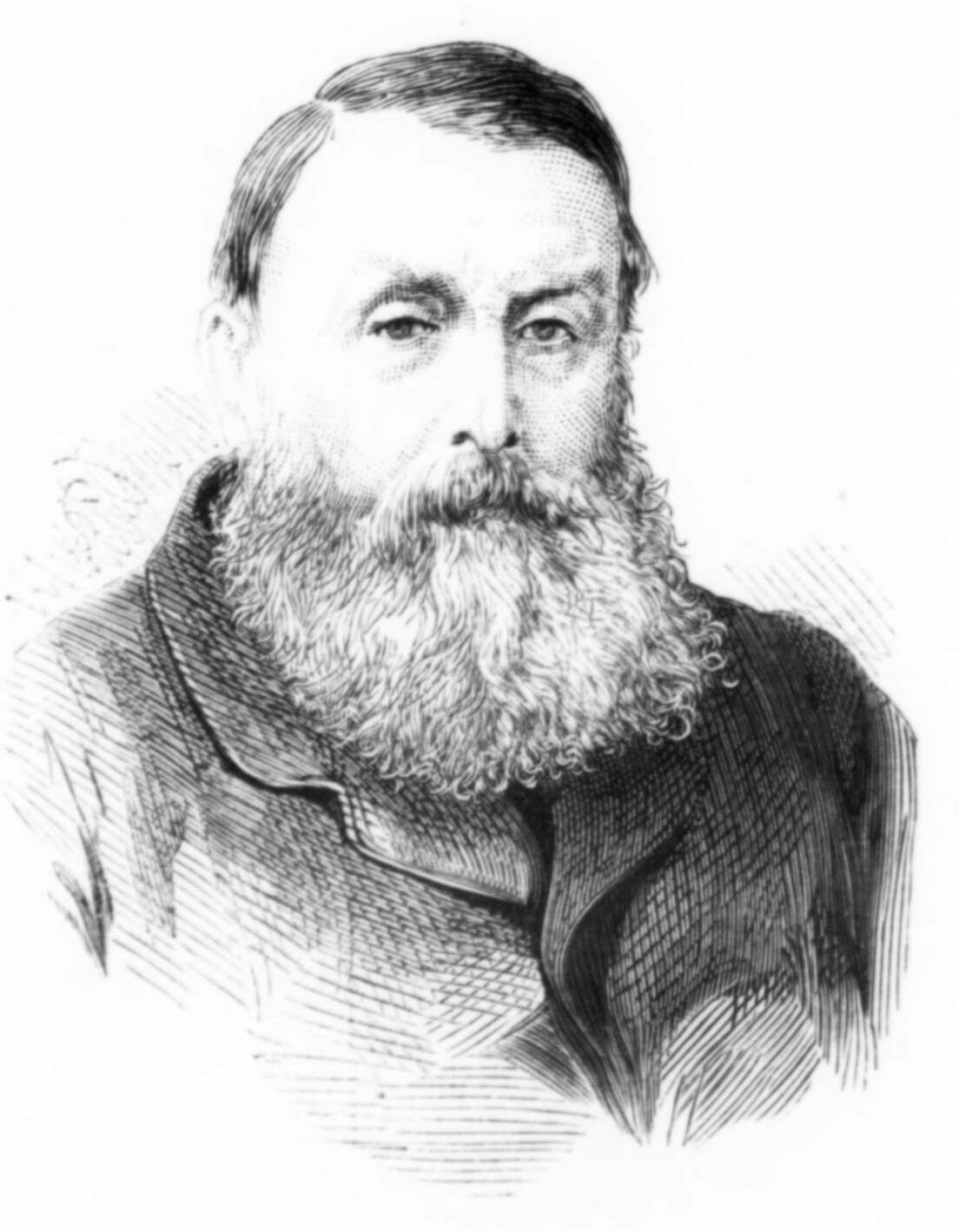
Likeness printed in The Illustrated London News, 8 March 1879.

Peter Le Neve Foster (1809–1879) was an English barrister and mathematician. He is known as an innovative secretary of the Royal Society of Arts, and a pioneer photographer of the Calotype Club.

== Life ==
Born 17 August 1809, he was the son of Peter le Neve Foster of Lenwade, Norfolk. He was educated under Dr. Edward Valpy at Norwich grammar school. He went on to Trinity Hall, Cambridge, graduating in the mathematical tripos in 1830, and being elected Fellow of his college.

In 1836 Foster was called to the bar, and practised as a conveyancer. In 1853 he became secretary to the Society of Arts, as successor to George Grove, a post he held for the rest of his life. With Henry Cole, Charles Wentworth Dilke, and others, he was heavily involved with the organisation of the Great Exhibition of 1851 and its successor 1862 International Exhibition. He was also connected with work on several of the earlier exhibitions abroad.

Foster was an early amateur photographer, and was one of the founders of the Photographic Society. With Roger Fenton he organised in 1852 the first photography exhibition held by the Society of Arts. He served for 13 years as secretary of the mechanical science section of the British Association. He served as President of the Quekett Microscopical Club in 1869. He died at Wandsworth, Surrey, 21 February 1879.

== Works ==
Foster was a contributor to scientific and technical journals; in the Journal of the Society of Arts he wrote a good deal, but generally anonymously. He read two papers before the Society, one on "Aluminium" (1859), and the other on the "Electric Loom" (1860).

== Peter Le Neve Foster Lecture ==
The Peter Le Neve Foster Lectures is an annual lecture series for the Royal Society of Arts, given since 1938. It was founded with money left by two of Foster's children, Reginald and Mary.

- 1938 A. E. W. Mason, The Artistic Future of the Films
- 1939 Philip Guedalla, The Method of Biography,
- 1942 Viscount Bennett, Empire Relations
- 1943 C. H. Desch, Magnesium
- 1944 Howard Walter Florey, Penicillin
- 1945 James Agate, A Moment in the History of the English Theatre
- 1948 Dilys Powell, The Development of the Film in Educational and Social Life
- 1950 (January) W. L. Andrews
- 1950 (December) A. C. Menzies, Modern Trends in Spectroscopy
- 1953 I. D. Wratten, A Century of Photography
- 1956 C. G. Mayer, Electronic Photography
- 1957 (January) A. R. N. Roberts, The Life and Work of W. R. Lethaby
- 1957 (November) Thomas Corbett, 2nd Baron Rowallan, Baden-Powell and the Boy Scouts
- 1959 Sylvia Townsend Warner, "Women as Writers"
- 1962 Henry George Miller, Priorities in Medicine
- 1964 Leon Radzinowicz, The Criminal in Society
- 1993 Sir Richard Luce, The role of the amateur in British arts

== Notes ==
Attribution

This article incorporates text from a publication now in the public domain: Stephen, Leslie, ed. (1889). "Foster, Peter Le Neve". Dictionary of National Biography. Vol. 20. London: Smith, Elder & Co.
