= Henry Reeve (journalist) =

English journalist

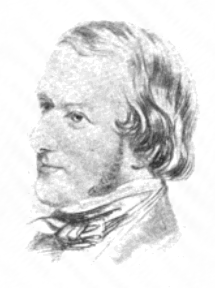
- Drawing by Elizabeth Eastlake
- Born: 9 September 1813; Norwich, Norfolk, England
- Died: 21 October 1895 (aged 82); Hampshire, England
- Education: Norwich School
- Occupations: Journalist, author
- Relatives: Lucie, Lady Duff-Gordon (cousin)

Signature
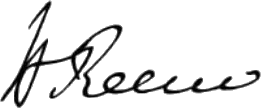

Henry Reeve (9 September 1813 – 21 October 1895) was an English man of letters and judicial official.

== Biography ==
He was the younger son of Henry Reeve, a Whig physician and writer from Norwich, and was born at Norwich. He was educated at the Norwich School under Edward Valpy. During his holidays he saw a good deal of the young John Stuart Mill. In 1829 he studied at Geneva and mixed in Genevese society, then very brilliant, and including the Sismondis, François Huber, Charles Victor de Bonstetten, Alphonse de Candolle, Pellegrino Rossi, Sigismund Krasinski (his most intimate friend), and Adam Mickiewicz, whose Faris he translated. During a visit to London in 1831 he was introduced to Thackeray and Thomas Carlyle, while through the Austins he made the acquaintance of other literary figures. Next year, in Paris, he met Victor Hugo, Victor Cousin, and Sir Walter Scott. He travelled in Italy, sat under Schelling at Munich and under Ludwig Tieck at Dresden, became in 1835-36 a member of Madame de Circourt's salon, and numbered among his friends Alphonse de Lamartine, Jean-Baptiste Henri Lacordaire, Alfred de Vigny, Adolphe Thiers, François Guizot, Charles Forbes René de Montalembert, and Alexis de Tocqueville, of whose books, Démocratie en Amérique and the Ancien Régime, he made standard translations into English.

In 1837 he was made clerk of appeal and then registrar to the judicial committee of the Privy Council. From 1840 to 1855 he wrote for The Times, his close touch with men like Guizot, Christian Bunsen, Lord Clarendon, and his own chief at the Privy Council Office, Charles Greville, enabling him to write with authority on foreign policy during the critical period from 1848 to the end of the Crimean War. Upon the promotion of Sir George Cornewall Lewis to the Cabinet early in 1855 Reeve was asked by Longman to edit the April number of the Edinburgh Review, to which his father had been one of the earliest contributors, and in the following July he became the editor. His friendship with the Orleanist leaders in France survived all vicissitudes, but he was appealed to for guidance by successive French ambassadors, and was more than once the medium of private negotiations between the English and French governments.

In April 1863, he published perhaps the most important of his contributions—a searching review of Kinglake's Crimea; and in 1872 he brought out a selection of his Quarterly and Edinburgh articles on eminent Frenchmen, entitled Royal and Republican France. Three years later appeared the first of three instalments (1875, 1885 and 1887) of his edition of the famous Memoirs which Charles Greville had placed in his hands a few hours before his death in 1865. In 1878 Reeve published a popular biography Petrarch. A purist in point of form and style, of the school of Thomas Macaulay and Henry Hart Milman, Reeve outlived his literary generation, and became one of the most reactionary of old Whigs. Yet he continued to edit and maintain the reputation of the Edinburgh until his death at his seat of Foxholes, in Christchurch, Hampshire on 21 October 1895. He had been elected a member of "The Club" in 1861, and served as its treasurer from 1867 to 1893. He was made a D.C.L. by the University of Oxford in 1869, a C.B. in 1871, and a corresponding member of the French Institute in 1865. A striking panegyric was pronounced upon him by his lifelong friend, the duc d'Aumale, before the Académie des Sciences on 16 November 1895.

His Memoirs and Letters (2 vols., with portrait) were edited by J. K. Laughton, in 1898.

In a March 1937 issue of The Times, there was an appeal for Henry Reeve's diary.

== Sources ==
- (The Encyclopædia Britannica article has the error "Rossil" for "Rossi".)
