= G. A. Williamson =

English classicist (1895–1982)

Geoffrey Arthur Williamson MC (1895–1982) was an English classicist and was a graduate of Oxford University. He was Senior Classics Master at Norwich School between 1922 and 1960.

== Background ==
Williamson was born in 1895. He was awarded the Military Cross in 1918.

He was a Classical Exhibitioner at Worcester College, Oxford University, graduating with a first class honours degree.

In 1922 he became the Senior Classics Master at Norwich School and served there until 1960.

Williamson translated several important histories into the English language. His translation of Eusebius has been published by Penguin Classics. He also translated Josephus: The Jewish War (1959) and Procopius: The Secret History (1966). In 1969 his edition of the Poems of Catullus was published in The Alpha Classics series by George Bell & Sons.

He was the father of the organ builder Martin Williamson.

== See also ==
- E. Mary Smallwood
