= William Briggs (physician) =

English physician and oculist

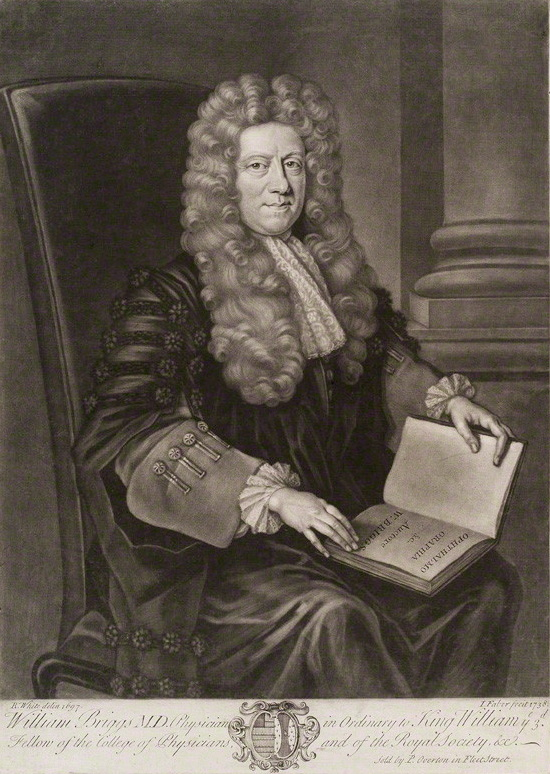
William Briggs (1697).

William Briggs (1642 – 4 September 1704) was an English physician and oculist.

== Life ==
Briggs was born at Norwich, for which city his father, Augustine Briggs, was four times MP. Following schooling at Norwich School he was entered at Corpus Christi College, Cambridge at age thirteen, under Thomas Tenison. He became a fellow of his college in 1668, and graduated M.A. in 1670. After some years spent in tuition and in studying medicine, he went to France and attended the lectures of Raymond Vieussens at Montpellier, under the patronage of Ralph Montagu (afterwards Duke of Montagu), then British ambassador to France. To him Briggs dedicated his Ophthalmographia, an anatomical description of the eye, published at Cambridge in 1676, on his return from France. He proceeded M.D. at Cambridge in 1677, and was elected a fellow of the London College of Physicians in 1682. In the latter year the first part of his Theory of Vision was published by Robert Hooke (Philosophical Collections, No. 6, p. 167); the second part was published in the Philosophical Transactions in 1683. The Theory of Vision was translated into Latin, and published in 1685 by desire of Sir Isaac Newton, who wrote a commendatory preface to it, acknowledging the benefit he had derived from Briggs's anatomical skill and knowledge. A second edition of the Ophthalmographia was published in 1687. Several points in Briggs's account of the eye are noteworthy, one being his recognition of the retina as an expansion in which the fibres of the optic nerve are spread out; another, his laying emphasis upon the hypothesis of vibrations as an explanation of the phenomena of nervous action. Briggs practised with great success in London, especially in diseases of the eye; was physician to St. Thomas's Hospital 1682–9, physician in ordinary to William III of England from 1696, and censor of the College of Physicians in 1685, 1686, 1692. In 1689, according to a curious memorial on one sheet preserved in the British Museum, Dr. Briggs was at great expense in vindicating the title of the crown to St. Thomas's Hospital, but was himself dismissed from his post, owing, as he states, to the machinations of a rival physician. From the same sheet we learn that, although he attended the royal household with great zeal for five years, he could get no pay; and notwithstanding that in 1698 William III promised that he should be considered, this was of no avail. In consequence of these circumstances, apparently early in Anne's reign, he begs for consideration in regard to the hospital appointment. He died on 4 September 1704, at Town Malling in Kent. His son, Henry Briggs, chaplain to George II, and rector of Holt, Norfolk, erected a cenotaph to his father's memory in Holt church in 1737. The inscription is quoted by Munk.

== Bibliography ==
- Harries, R.; Cattermole, P.; Mackintosh, P. (1991). A History of Norwich School: King Edward VI's Grammar School at Norwich. Norwich: Friends of Norwich School. ISBN 978-0-9518561-1-6.
