= Groome =

Groome is an English surname and may refer to:

- Francis Hindes Groome (1851–1902), British writer about the Romani
- Georgia Groome (born 1992), British actress
- James Black Groome (1838–1893), governor and US Senator from Maryland
- Jay Groome (born 1998), American baseball player
- Jeremy Groome (born 1955), English cricketer
- John Groome (disambiguation), multiple people
- Micky Groome (born 1951), English musician
- Reginald K. Groome (1928–1999), Canadian hotel executive and Boy Scouts leader
- Robert Hindes Groome (1810–1889), English clergyman
- Robert Leonard Groome (1848–1917), English Royal Navy officer
- Roger Groome, Trinidadian footballer
- Roland Groome (1897–1935), Canadian aviator
- Thomas Groome (born 1945), Irish author and professor

== See also ==
- Groom (surname)
