= God Is Working His Purpose Out =

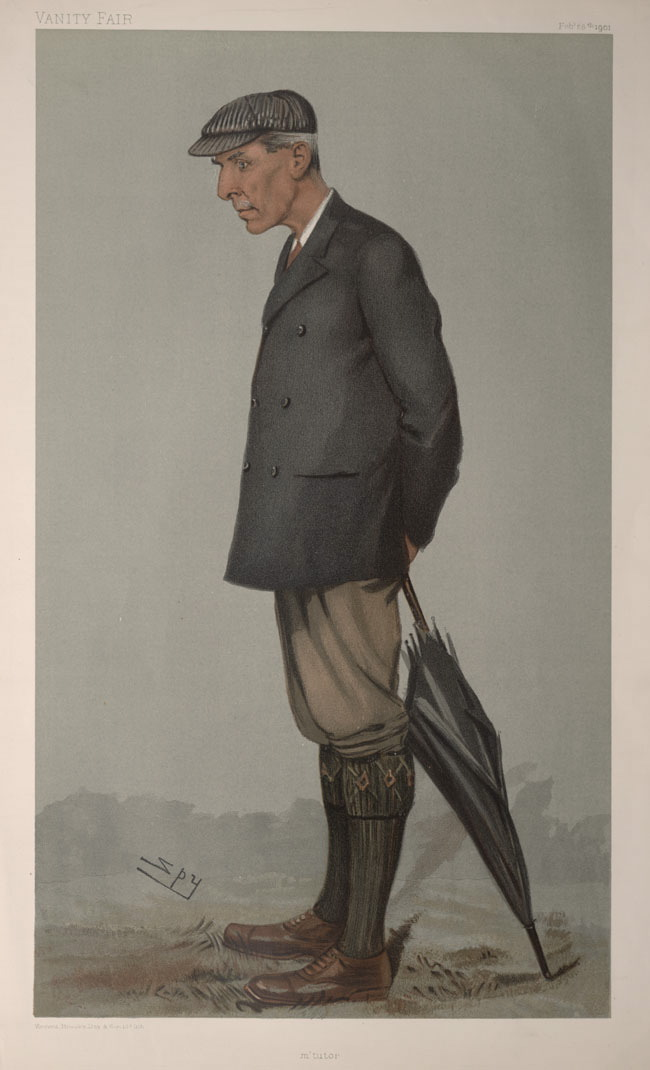
- Arthur Campbell Ainger, Vanity Fair, 1901
- Genre: Hymn
- Written: 1894
- Text: Arthur Campbell Ainger
- Based on: Habakkuk 2:14

"God Is Working His Purpose Out" is an English Christian hymn. It was written in 1894 by Arthur Campbell Ainger as a tribute to the Archbishop of Canterbury, Edward White Benson. The original music for the hymn was written at the same time by Millicent D. Kingham but a number of other pieces of music have been used for the hymn in recent times.

== History ==
In 1894, Ainger was a Master at Eton College, where he had a reputation for being a fair teacher and had the respect of his pupils for a reasonable approach to discipline at the school. As the son of a vicar, he had written a number of songs and hymns for the school in English and in Latin. Ainger wrote "God Is Working His Purpose Out" as a tribute to the Archbishop of Canterbury, Edward White Benson, who was a former Master at Rugby School and headmaster at Wellington College. it was also written as a hymn for the boys of Eton. The hymn was first published in a leaflet with a tune composed by Kingham titled "Benson".

"God Is Working His Purpose Out" was then published nationwide in the Church of England's "Church Missionary Hymn Book". It also started to be published within public school hymnals, however when it was published in "Public School Hymn Book" the tune was changed from "Benson" to a newly commissioned tune titled "Alveston". Some modern hymn books also do not use "Benson" as the tune, instead using "Purpose", written by Martin Shaw in 1953. although Common Praise (the successor to Hymns Ancient and Modern) continues to do so.

== Scripture ==
"God Is Working his Purpose Out"'s refrain is based on Habakkuk 2:14; "For the earth will be filled With the knowledge of the glory of the LORD, As the waters cover the sea." The hymn references God being always at work to realize his will for the world and for humanity. It also references Philippians 2:12–13 in that God works in humanity to act according to his purpose.

== Lyrics ==
The lyrics for the hymn were written by Ainger.

1.

God is working his purpose out
As year succeeds to year:
God is working his purpose out
And the time is drawing near;
Nearer and nearer draws the time
The time that shall surely be,
When the earth shall be filled with the glory of God
As the waters cover the sea.

2.

From farthest east to farthest west,
Where human feet have trod,
By the voice of many messengers
Goes forth the voice of God:
'Give ear to me, you continents,
You islands give ear to me,
That earth may be filled with the glory of God,
As the waters cover the sea.'

3.

Let us go forth in the strength of God,
With the banner of Christ unfurled,
That the light of the glorious gospel of truth
May shine throughout the world:
Let us all fight with sorrow and sin,
To set their captives free,
That the earth may be filled with the glory of God,
As the waters cover the sea.

4.

All that we do can have no worth,
Unless God bless the deed;
Vainly we hope for the harvest-tide,
Till God gives life to the seed;
Yet nearer and nearer draws the time,
The time that shall surely be,
When the earth shall be filled with the glory of God
As the waters cover the sea.

Additional Verse (sometimes sung after verse 2).

What can we do to work God's work,
To prosper and increase
The brotherhood of all mankind,
The reign of the Prince of Peace?
What can we do to hasten the time,
The time that shall surely be,
When the earth shall be filled with the glory of God
As the waters cover the sea?
