= William Stebbing =

William Stebbing (16 May 1831 – 27 May 1926) was a British journalist.

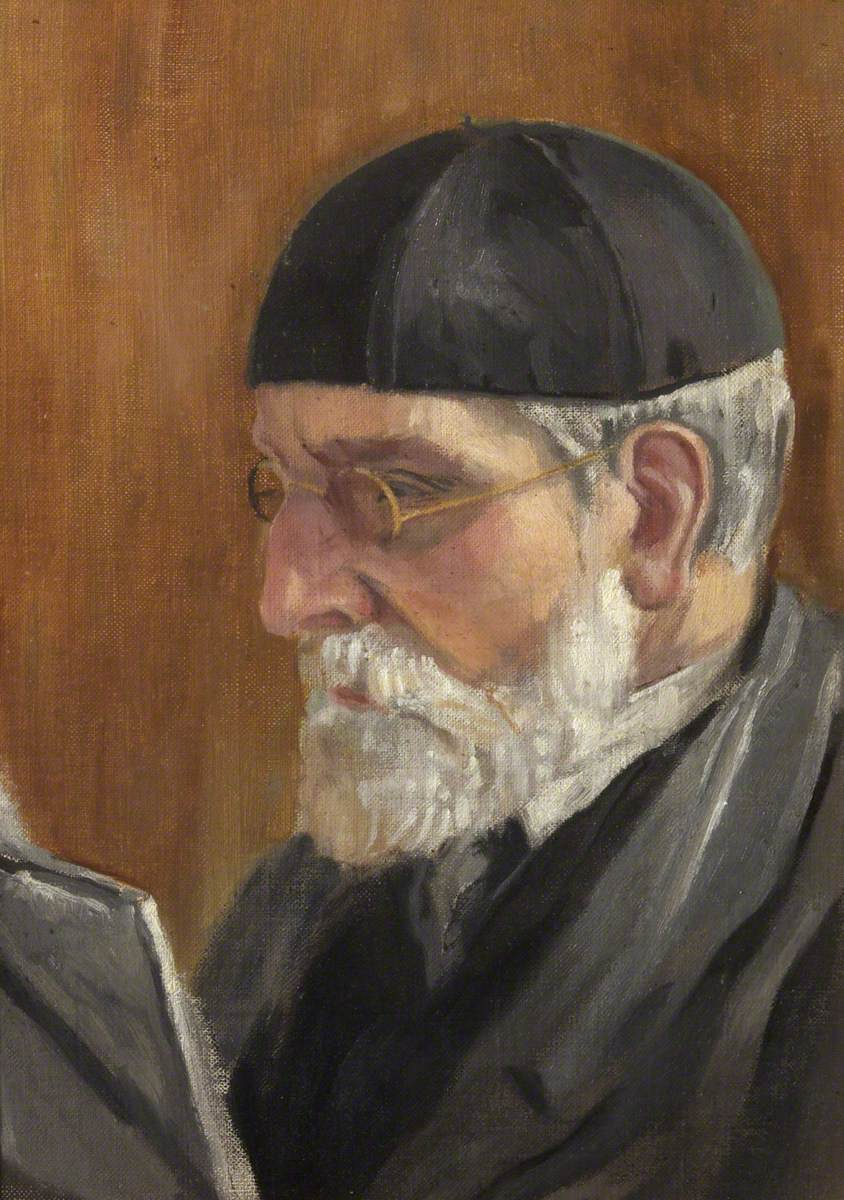
Image of William Stebbing

He was the son of the Rev. Dr. Henry Stebbing and one of his brothers was Thomas Roscoe Rede Stebbing. He was educated at Westminster School, King's College London, Lincoln College, Oxford and Worcester College, Oxford. He gained a First Class degree in Moderations in 1852, a First in Literae humaniores in 1853 and a First in School of Law and Modern History in 1854.

He was called to the bar by Lincoln's Inn, where he practised as a conveyancer and equity barrister.

He was a leader writer for The Times under John Thadeus Delane and in 1870 he succeeded George Webbe Dasent as the paper's assistant editor. When Delane retired in 1877, Stebbing edited the paper until Thomas Chenery was appointed in 1878, whereupon Stebbing retired as assistant editor, although he still contributed articles. He also wrote for the Saturday and the Edinburgh Review.

He was a member of the Reform Club and, from 1881, of the Athenaeum. In 1870 he married Anne Pinckard Pidgeon (the daughter of Jonathon Sills Pidgeon) with whom he had three sons and two daughters.

== Works ==
- Analysis of Mr. Mill's System of Logic (1864).
- Sir Walter Ralegh, a biography (1871).
- Some Verdicts of History Reviewed (1887).
- Charles Henry Pearson, Fellow of Oriel and Education Minister in Victoria (1900).
- The Poets: Geoffrey Chaucer to Alfred Tennyson, 1340–1892: impressions (1907).
- Five Centuries of English Verse (1910).
- Truths or Truisms (1911).
- Greek and Latin Anthology Thought into English Verse (1923).
