= John Groome (divine) =

English clergyman

John Groome (c. 1678–1760) was an English clergyman.

== Life ==
Groome was born in 1678 or 1679. He was the son of John Groome of Norwich. After attending Norwich grammar school he entered Magdalene College, Cambridge, as a sizar on 14 October 1695, and proceeded to do his B.A. in 1699. In July 1709 he was presented to the vicarage of Childerditch, Essex, and also became chaplain to Robert Darcy, 3rd Earl of Holderness. Grieved by unjust reflections cast upon the clergy, he wrote The Dignity and Honour of the Clergy represented in an Historical Collection: shewing how useful and serviceable the Clergy have been to this Nation by their universal learning, acts of charity, and the administration of civil offices (1710).

Groome died in the parish of St. Mary, Whitechapel, on 31 July 1760, and was buried at Childerditch. He had married, but left no children. By his will he bequeathed property for founding exhibitions at Magdalene College, preference to be given to clergymen's sons from Essex. He provided for the payment of six pounds a year to the succeeding vicars of Childerditch for ever, that they might go to the college on St. Mary Magdalen's day, 22 July, "when the publick benefactions are read over" to see that his exhibitions were filled in; the profits of such as were vacant to go to the vicar. Groome also gave his library to Magdalene College.
