= Arthur Campbell Ainger =

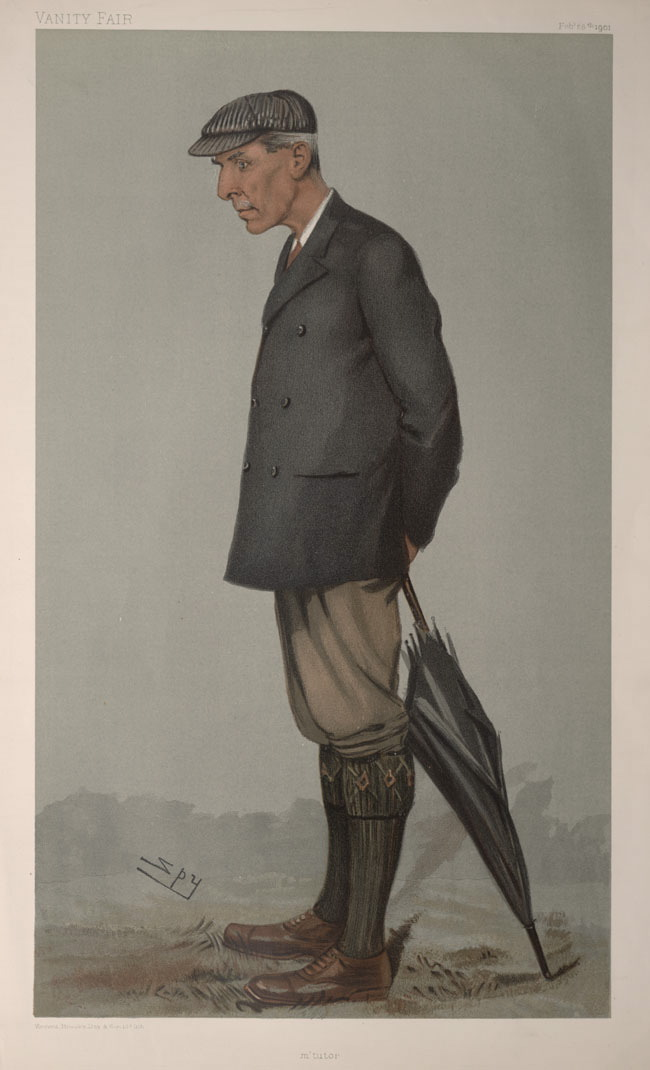
"m’tutor". Caricature of Arthur Ainger by Spy in Vanity Fair in February 1901

Arthur Campbell Ainger MVO (4 July 1841, Greenwich, Kent – 26 October 1919, Eton, now in Berkshire) was an assistant master at Eton College from 1864 to 1901, and wrote the text of more than ten Christian hymns, one of note being God Is Working His Purpose Out (1894).

Ainger, whose father was Rev. Thomas Ainger, was educated at Eton College, and in 1860 matriculated at Trinity College, Cambridge; there he became a Scholar in 1863 and graduated B.A. (16th in Classics Tripos) in 1864 and M.A. in 1867. At Trinity College he gave two Clark Lectures: Chaucer (1900) and Shakespeare as a humorist (1901). He was appointed a Member of the Royal Victorian Order (MVO) in 1908.

Ainger also wrote several books. He is most well known for his hymn ‘God of our fathers, unto Thee’, which originally was written to exemplify the idea that Heaven is the fatherland of the Christian, yet was later altered by J.M. Morris to glorify England as the ‘New Jerusalem.’

== Selected publications ==
- with H. G. Wintle: The Eton Latin grammar. Pt. I. Elementary. J. Murray, etc., etc. 1887.
- Heathcote, J. M., ed. (1890). "Fives by A. Ainger". Tennis. pp. 411–434. (See Fives.)
- Heathcote, J. M., ed. (1890). "A Song of Fives, words by A. Ainger, music by J. Barnby". Tennis. pp. 435–436.
- with H. G. Wintle: An English-Latin gradus or verse dictionary. J. Murray. 1891.
- Memories of Eton sixty years ago, by Arthur Campbell Ainger, with contributions from Neville Gerald Lyttelton and John Murray. J, Murray. 1917.
