= Geoffrey Stevens (cricketer) =

English cricketer

Personal information
- Full name: Geoffrey Alden Stevens
- Born: 17 October 1890; Norwich, Norfolk, England
- Died: 24 March 1963 (aged 72); Norwich, Norfolk, England
- Batting: Right-handed

Domestic team information
- Years: Team
- 1907–1930: Norfolk
- 1912–1924: Minor Counties

Career statistics
| Competition | First-class |
|---|---|
| Matches | 3 |
| Runs scored | 56 |
| Batting average | 11.20 |
| 100s/50s | –/– |
| Top score | 20 |
| Catches/stumpings | 6/– |
- Source: Cricinfo, 12 June 2019

Geoffrey Alden Stevens (17 October 1890 – 24 March 1963) was an English first-class cricketer.

Stevens was born at Norwich in October 1890 and was educated at Norwich School. He made his debut in minor counties cricket for Norfolk in the 1907 Minor Counties Championship. He made his debut in first-class cricket when he was selected to play for the Minor Counties cricket team against the touring South Africans at Stoke-on-Trent in 1912. His second appearance in first-class cricket came the following year for L. G. Robinson's XI against Cambridge University at Attleborough. His minor counties career was interrupted by the First World War, during which Stevens' served with the Royal Engineers, enlisting in March 1915 as a second lieutenant. He was made a temporary lieutenant in December 1915. Shortly after the conclusion of the war, he was made a temporary captain in January 1919, which he relinquished in January 1921.

He returned to playing minor counties cricket for Norfolk in 1920. His third and final appearance in first-class cricket came in 1924 for the Minor Counties cricket team against the touring South Africans at Lakenham. He played minor counties cricket for Norfolk until 1930, having made a total of 158 appearances. He was for many years one of the leading batsman in minor counties cricket, scoring 8,625 for Norfolk, which included fifteen centuries and two scores of over 200. He was the secretary of Norfolk County Cricket Club from 1952–61. Outside of cricket, Stevens was a civil engineer and a member of the Institution of Civil Engineers. He died at Norwich in March 1963.
