= Thomas Ainger =

English clergyman (1799–1863)

Thomas Ainger (1 August 1799 – 15 November 1863) was an English clergyman.

== Biography ==
He was born on 1 August 1799 at Whittlesey and educated at the Norwich grammar school and St. John's College, Cambridge. He graduated in 1821, became curate at St. Giles's, Reading, in 1822, and afterwards assistant minister at St. Mary's, Greenwich. He married Frances Barnard in 1828, and left a family. In 1841 he was presented by Sir Thomas Maryon Wilson to the perpetual curacy of Hampstead, which he held till his death on 15 November 1863 aged 64. In 1859 he became honorary prebendary of St. Paul's. Mr. Ainger was energetic as a parish clergyman and poor-law guardian; he enlarged his church, and helped to found schools and a dispensary and to provide new churches in the rapidly developing district round Hampstead. His performance of the divine services is said to have been very impressive. His publications consisted of a few sermons. Arthur Campbell Ainger was his son.
