= Hugh Seagrim =

Recipient of the George Cross

- Born: 24 March 1909; Highclere, Hampshire, England
- Died: 22 September 1944 (aged 35); Rangoon, Burma
- Burial place: Rangoon War Cemetery
- Relatives: Derek Seagrim (brother)
- Military career
- Allegiance: United Kingdom
- Branch: British Indian Army
- Service years: 1928–1944
- Rank: Major
- Nickname: Grandfather Longlegs
- Service number: 49359
- Conflicts: Second World War; Burma campaign (1944–1945)
- Awards: George Cross; Distinguished Service Order; Member of the Order of the British Empire

Hugh Paul Seagrim, GC, DSO, MBE (24 March 1909 – 22 September 1944), nicknamed "Grandfather Longlegs", was a British Indian Army officer notable for his leadership of Karen rebels in fighting Japanese invaders in Burma during the Second World War.

Seagrim's brother was Derek Seagrim, a recipient of the Victoria Cross. He and his brother have the distinction of being the only siblings awarded the Victoria Cross and the George Cross, both posthumously.

== Early life and military career ==
Seagrim was born in Ashmansworth, Hampshire, England, on 24 March 1909. He was educated at Norwich School, graduated from the Royal Military College, Sandhurst, and joined the British Indian Army, becoming an officer in the 19th Hyderabad Regiment. He was later seconded to the 20th Burma Rifles with the temporary rank of major, becoming an expert in several Burmese languages. When the Japanese invaded Burma, he was given the task of raising irregular guerrilla forces from the Karens and other groups.

The British were driven from Burma by May 1942, and Seagrim and his force were isolated for a long time. Eventually Force 136 dropped agents and wireless operators who made contact with his guerrillas in October 1943.

Seagrim led Karens in a campaign of sabotage against the occupation. His force enjoyed much support from Karen civilians despite a series of brutal Japanese reprisal killings against Karen villages. His force was gradually wiped out by a concentrated Japanese manhunt. To prevent further bloodshed Seagrim surrendered himself to the Japanese forces on 15 March 1944. He and eight of his Karen companions were executed by the Japanese on 22 September 1944 in Rangoon. For gallantry under captivity, he was posthumously awarded the George Cross in 1946.

== George Cross citation ==
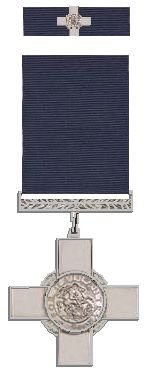
George Cross and its ribbon bar

Seagrim's George Cross citation appeared in the London Gazette on 12 September 1946:

Awarded the George Cross for most conspicuous gallantry in carrying out hazardous work in a very brave manner. Major Seagrim was the leader of a party which included two other British and one Karen officer working in the Karen Hills of Burma. By the end of 1943 the Japanese had learned of this party who then commenced a campaign of arrests and torture to determine their whereabouts. In February 1944 the other two British officers were ambushed and killed but Major Seagrim and the Karen officer escaped. The Japanese then arrested 270 Karens and tortured and killed many of them but still they continued to support Major Seagrim. To end further suffering to the Karens, Seagrim surrendered himself to the Japanese on 15th March 1944. He was taken to Rangoon and together with eight others he was sentenced to death. He pleaded that the others were following his orders and as such they should be spared, but they were determined to die with him and were all executed.

— London Gazette

== Notes ==
Seagrim was 6 feet 4 inches (1.93 m) tall, and sometimes referred to as "Grandfather Longlegs".

== Sources ==
- Allen, Louis, Burma: The Longest War (Orion Publishing, 2000)
- Davies, Philip, Lost Warriors: Seagrim and Pagani's Burma: The Last Great Untold Story of WWII (Atlantic Publishing, 2017)
- Morrison, Ian, Grandfather Longlegs: The Life and Gallant Death of Major H.P. Seagrim (Faber & Faber, 1947)
