= Derek Anthony Seagrim =

Recipient of the Victoria Cross

- Born: 24 September 1903; Bournemouth, Hampshire, England
- Died: 6 April 1943 (aged 39); Sfax, French Tunisia
- Burial place: Sfax War Cemetery, Tunisia
- Relatives: Hugh Seagrim GC (brother)
- Military career
- Allegiance: United Kingdom
- Branch: British Army
- Service years: 1923–1943
- Rank: Lieutenant Colonel
- Service number: 26914
- Units: King's African Rifles; Green Howards
- Commands: 7th Battalion, Green Howards
- Conflicts: World War II: North African Campaign; Tunisian campaign; Battle of the Mareth Line; Battle of Wadi Akarit (DOW)
- Awards: Victoria Cross

Lieutenant Colonel Derek Anthony Seagrim VC (24 September 1903 – 6 April 1943) was a British Army officer and an English recipient of the Victoria Cross (VC), the highest and most prestigious award for gallantry in the face of the enemy that can be awarded to British and Commonwealth forces. His VC was earned during the North Africa Campaign.

His brother was Hugh Seagrim GC. He and his brother have the distinction of being the only siblings awarded the Victoria Cross and George Cross, both posthumously.

== Life ==
Born in Bournemouth, Hampshire (now Dorset) on 24 September 1903, Derek was the third of five sons, one of his younger brothers was Hugh Seagrim GC, giving these two brothers the distinction of being the only siblings to receive the Victoria Cross and George Cross. His father was the Reverend Charles Seagrim, rector of Whissonsett in Norfolk and he was educated at St John's School, Leatherhead, and at Norwich School, where his younger brother Hugh also attended later.

He received his commission into the Green Howards in 1923 and served in Jamaica, Palestine and China. He completed a three-year tour with the King's African Rifles in East Africa and, in 1939, returned to the 1st Battalion, Green Howards in Palestine as Intelligence Officer. At the outbreak of World War II, he was an Air Liaison Officer in East Africa before working on the staff for the Greek Campaign between 1941–42. He was given command of the 7th Battalion, Green Howards at El Alamein in October 1942. The battalion was part of the 69th Infantry Brigade of the 50th (Northumbrian) Infantry Division.

When he was 39 years old, Derek Seagrim was made a temporary lieutenant colonel in the 7th Battalion, The Green Howards (Alexandra Princess of Wales's Own Yorkshire Regiment).

On 20/21 March 1943 at the Mareth Line, Tunisia, Lieutenant Colonel Seagrim's courage and leadership led directly to the capture of an important objective. When it appeared that the attack on the position would fail owing to the intensity of enemy fire, he placed himself at the head of his battalion and led them forward. He personally helped to place a scaling ladder over an anti-tank ditch and was the first across. Leading an attack on two machine-gun posts, he accounted for 20 of the enemy and when a counter-attack was launched next day he moved from post to post quite unperturbed, until it was defeated.

He died at a military hospital near Sfax on 6 April 1943 after being severely wounded at the Battle of Wadi Akarit. He is buried in Sfax War Cemetery, Tunisia, Plot XIV Row C Grave 21.

Derek Anthony Seagrim's medals are on display at the Lord Ashcroft Gallery in the Imperial War Museum in London.
