= Edward Valpy =

English cleric, classical scholar and schoolteacher

Edward Valpy (1764–1832) was an English cleric, classical scholar and schoolteacher.

== Life ==
Valpy, the fourth son of Richard Valpy of St. John's, Jersey, by his wife Catherine, daughter of John Chevalier, was born at Reading. He was educated at Trinity College, Cambridge, graduating B.D. in 1810. After leaving college he acted for many years as a master at Reading grammar school under his brother, Richard Valpy.

In 1810 Valpy was elected high master of Norwich Grammar School, which flourished under his direction. Much later, a school house was named after him. In 1819 he became rector of All Saints, Thwaite, and vicar of St. Mary, South Walsham, both in Norfolk. These livings he held until his death at Yarmouth on 15 April 1832.

== Works ==
- Elegantiæ Latinæ; or Rules and Exercises illustrative of Elegant Latin Style, 1803, which went through ten editions in his lifetime.
- The Greek Testament, with English notes, selected and original, 3 vols. 1815; this work was well received and was much improved in a new edition of 1826 (Hartwell Horne, Compendious Introduction, 1827).

== Family ==
Valpy married Anne, daughter of Thomas Western of Great Abington, Cambridgeshire, and widow of Chaloner-Byng Baldock, vicar of Milton Abbey in Dorset. By her he had a son, the Rev. Edward John Western Valpy, who died in 1830. The English printer and publisher Abraham John Valpy and the New Zealand settler William Henry Valpy were Edward Valpy's nephews.
