= Norwich School =

Public school in Norfolk, England

Location
- 70 The Close; Norwich, Norfolk, NR1 4DD; England; 52°37′54″N 1°17′57″E

Information
- Type: Private day school Public school
- Motto: Praemia Virtutis Honores (Honours are the rewards of virtue)
- Religious affiliation: Church of England
- Established: 1096; 1547 (Refoundation)
- Founders: Herbert de Losinga; Edward VI
- Department for Education URN: 121242 Tables
- Chairman of the governors: P. J. E. Smith
- Head master: Steffan Griffiths
- Staff: 140 (full-time)
- Gender: Co-educational
- Age: 4 to 18
- Enrolment: 1,171
- Houses: Brooke, Coke, Seagrim, Nelson, Parker, Repton, School, Valpy
- Colours: Royal blue and burgundy
- Publication: The Norvicensian; Old Norvicensian; The Longbow
- Alumni: Old Norvicensians ("ONs")
- Affiliations: Worshipful Company of Dyers; HMC, CSA, IAPS
- Website: www.norwich-school.org.uk

Norwich School (formally King Edward VI Grammar School, Norwich) (Note: The school is registered with the Charity Commission as "King Edward The Sixth Grammar School, Norwich" operating under the name of Norwich School. It has also been variously known throughout its history as Schola Regia Norvicensis, the "Free School", "Norwich Grammar School", "The strangers school" and "King Edward VI Grammar School at Norwich".) is a private selective day school in the close of Norwich Cathedral, Norwich. Among the oldest schools in the United Kingdom, it has a traceable history to 1096 as an episcopal grammar school established by Herbert de Losinga, first Bishop of Norwich. In the 16th century the school came under the control of the city of Norwich and moved to Blackfriars' Hall following a successful petition to Henry VIII. The school was refounded in 1547 in a royal charter granted by Edward VI and moved to its current site beside the cathedral in 1551. In the 19th century it became independent of the city and its classical curriculum was broadened in response to the declining demand for classical education following the Industrial Revolution.

Early statutes declared the school was to instruct 90 sons of Norwich citizens, though it has since grown to a total enrolment of approximately 1,020 pupils. For most of its history it was a boys' school, before becoming co-educational in the sixth form in 1994 and in every year group in 2010. The school is divided into the Senior School, which has around 850 pupils aged from 11 to 18 across eight houses, and the Lower School, which was established in 1946 and has around 250 pupils aged from 4 to 11. The school educates the choristers of the cathedral, with which the school has a close relationship and which is used for morning assemblies and events throughout the academic year. In league tables of British schools it is consistently ranked first in Norfolk and Suffolk and amongst the highest in the United Kingdom.

Former pupils are referred to as Old Norvicensians or ONs. The school has maintained a strong academic tradition and has educated a number of notable figures including Lord Nelson, Sir Edward Coke and 18 Fellows of the Royal Society among many others. Several members of the Norwich school of painters, the first provincial art movement in England, were educated at the school and the movement's founder, John Crome, also taught at the school. It is a founding member of the Headmasters' and Headmistresses' Conference (HMC), a member of the Choir Schools' Association and has a historical connection with the Worshipful Company of Dyers, one of the Livery Companies of the City of London.

== History ==
=== Establishment and early history ===
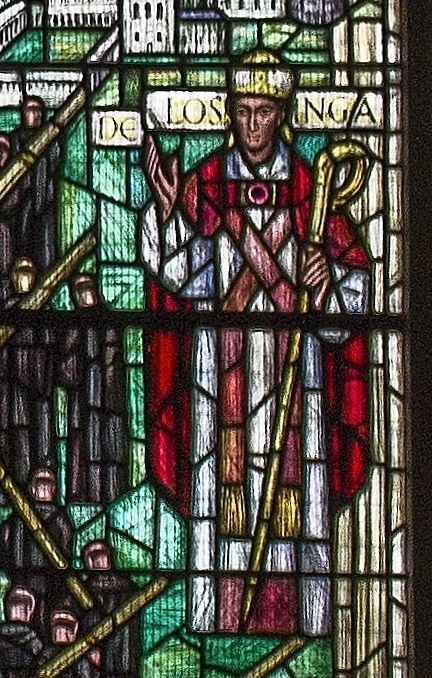
Stained-glass depiction of Herbert de Losinga in Norwich Cathedral

Norwich School traces its origins to the founding of an episcopal grammar school in 1096 by Herbert de Losinga, first Bishop of Norwich. The continuity of the current Norwich School with the 1096 school would make it one of the oldest surviving schools in the United Kingdom. The newly established school occupied a site on "Holmstrete" in the parish of St Matthew between the close of Norwich Cathedral and the River Wensum. Until the English Reformation the bishop would appoint the headteacher (termed Head Master by the school), though on several occasions this role had been fulfilled by the Archbishop of Canterbury. (Note: In 1288 Archbishop John Peckham appointed Godfrey of Norton as master, and in 1369 Archbishop Whittlesey appointed William Bunting.) The earliest known headteacher is Vincent of Scarning, who is mentioned in 1240 regarding a financial dispute with a school in Rudham.

In 1538, the school was separated from its cathedral foundation and placed under the control of the mayor, sheriffs, and commonalty of the city of Norwich following a successful petition to Henry VIII for the possession of Blackfriars' Hall, a Dominican friary which was surrendered to the Crown in the dissolution of the monasteries. Two prominent citizens of the city, Augustine Steward and Edward Rede, after consulting Thomas Howard, 3rd Duke of Norfolk, promised on the city's behalf "to fynd a perpetual free-schole therein for the good erudicion and education of yought in lernyng and vertue". Following repairs, the school moved to the former friary in 1541, occupying part of the south-west cloister, where it educated 20 boys under a master and a sub-master.

=== 16th and 17th centuries ===
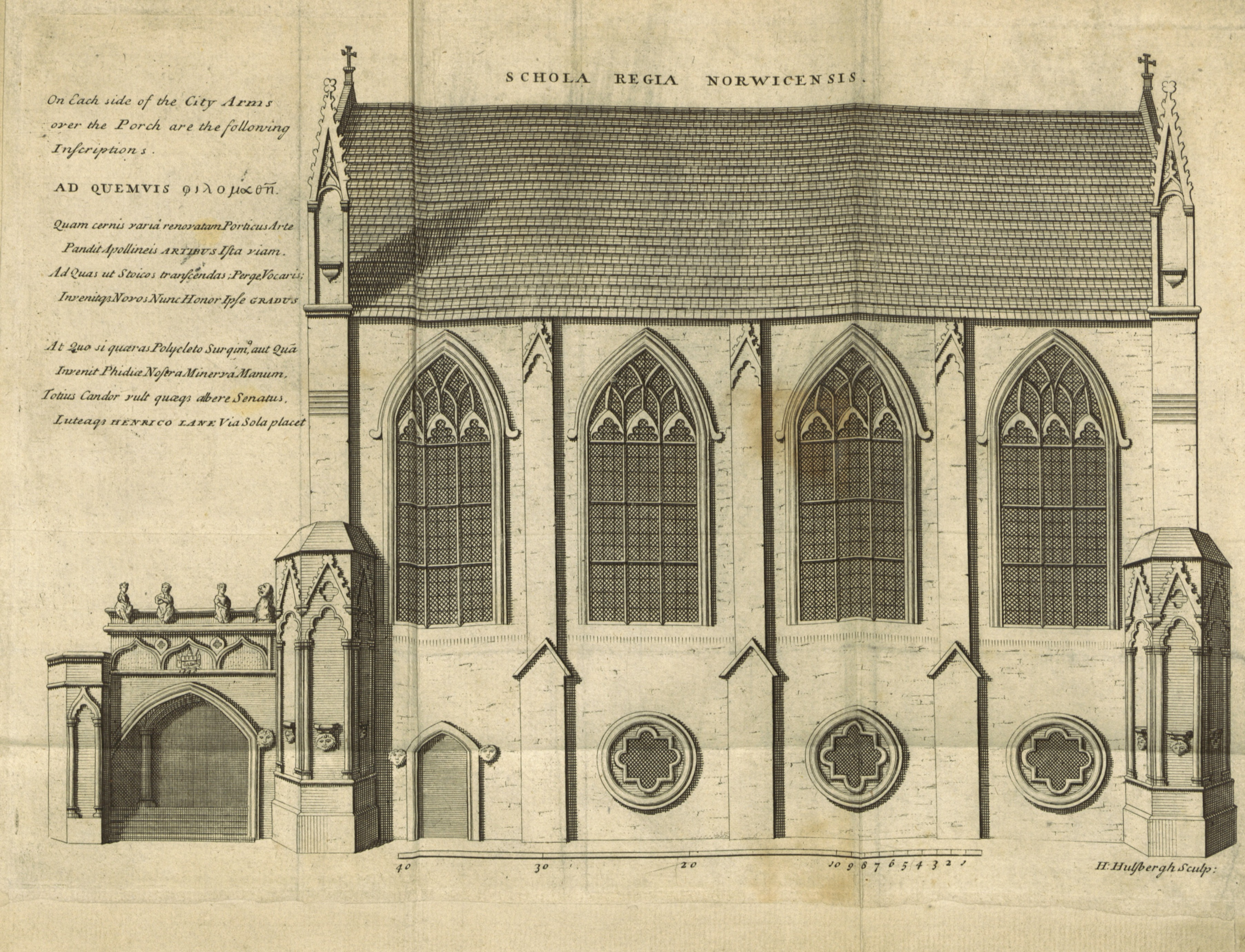
A 1712 illustration of the Schola Regia Norwicensis, the former chapel of St John the Evangelist

The school was refounded as King Edward VI Grammar School in a royal charter granted by Edward VI dated 7 May 1547. Issued four months into the king's accession, the charter expressly implemented an arrangement designed by Henry VIII and was confirmed by Edward Seymour, Lord Protector. Unusually for a cathedral city Norwich did not receive a cathedral school following the Reformation, but an endowed city grammar school. Norwich Cathedral was the first of the eight cathedral priories to surrender to the Crown, formally being re-established as a secular cathedral with a dean and chapter on 2 May 1538. Consequently, negotiations over the refoundation charter were between the city, rather than the cathedral, and the Crown. Known as the Great Hospital Charter, it granted the city possession of St Giles' hospital, also called the Great Hospital, and merged the school with it in the hope of achieving an integrated system of education and poor relief. These plans were never realised, however, as the Great Hospital was partially stripped for building materials and later sacked during Kett's Rebellion in 1549. The school temporarily occupied St Luke's House, a building north-west of the cathedral.

In 1550 the city purchased the former chantry chapel and college of St John the Evangelist beside the cathedral for the use of the grammar school out of the £200 each year at their disposal in a licence in mortmain to purchase and add to the revenues of the Great Hospital. Founded in 1316 by John Salmon, Bishop of Norwich, the chapel, in addition to its role as a chantry dedicated to the souls of Salmon's parents and the predecessors and successors of the Bishops of Norwich had also been used as a charnel house and contained the Wodehouse chantry, founded by Henry V at the request of John Wodehous, a veteran of the Battle of Agincourt. The school moved to the site in the summer of 1551, where it has remained ever since. The chapel was used as the main schoolroom while the other buildings were used to provide a library and accommodation for the master and boarding pupils. The arrangement continued until the 19th century, and today the building is used as the school chapel.

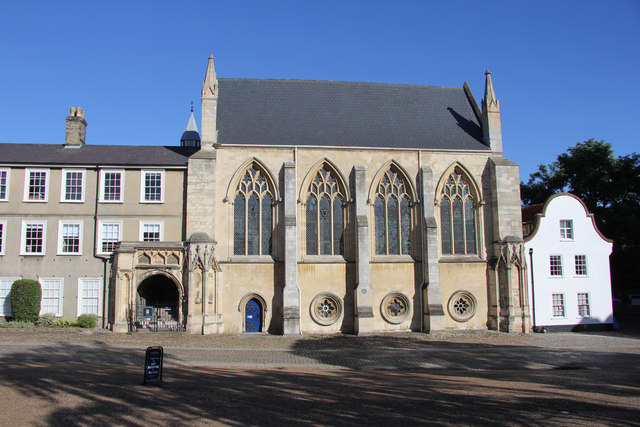
The school chapel

A master and "usher" (deputy headteacher) were to be appointed by the city out of the revenues assigned to them, who were required to have a good knowledge of classical languages, namely Latin and Greek. Additionally, the master was required to be a university graduate, of "sound religion", and not to take on additional work. The salary of the usher was £6. 13s. 4d. and the master a "handsome" sum of £10, which by 1636 had risen to £50. The 1566 statutes declared the school was to provide Greek and Latin instruction for 90 sons of Norwich citizens free of expense and up to ten fee-paying pupils. By the 19th century the city was observed to generally leave room for as many boarders and other day scholars to sufficiently remunerate the teachers. Admission was limited to boys thought to benefit from the education offered, and the school was highly selective as a result. The education was based on erudition, the eventual goal being that by the age of 18 the pupils would have learned "to vary one sentence diversely, to make a verse exactly, to endight an epistle eloquently and learnedly, to declaim of a theme simple, and last of all to attain some competent knowledge of the Greek tongue". Pupils were taught rhetoric based on the Rhetorica ad Herennium, and Greek centred around the works of Homer and Virgil. In addition to classical literature, etiquette was taught as both were deemed fundamental to a good education. Edward Coke studied at the school at the age of eight from 1560 until 1567, where he is said to have been taught to value the "forcefulness of freedom of speech", something he later applied as a judge.

As part of the annual Guild Day procession of the inauguration of the new mayor of Norwich it was tradition for the head boy to deliver a short speech in Latin from the school porch "commending justice and obedyence" to the mayor and corporation. Afterwards the orator would attend the guild dinner, historically riding in the procession on a white horse, but in later years taken in the mayor's carriage. When Elizabeth I visited Norwich on a separate occasion in 1578 the master at the time, Stephen Limbert, is said to have delivered an oration, which "so pleased Her Majesty that she said it had been the best she had heard, and gave him her hand to kiss, and afterwards sent back to enquire his name." The encounter has been said to characterise the public image of Elizabeth I as a monarch who indulged her subjects with goodwill and has been used for the interpretation of the character of Theseus in Shakespeare's A Midsummer Night's Dream.

Henry Mazey was Master of the school from 1665 to 1667, after four years at Holt School; the boys petitioned against him to the Mayor of Norwich, on the grounds that he was suffering from "chiragra, podagra, and desidia"; and that in the time of Mr Loveringe they had been "Minerva's darlings", but they were now "made Vulcan's servile bond slaves". Mazey made a getaway by gaining the post of Rector of Rockland.

=== 18th and 19th centuries ===
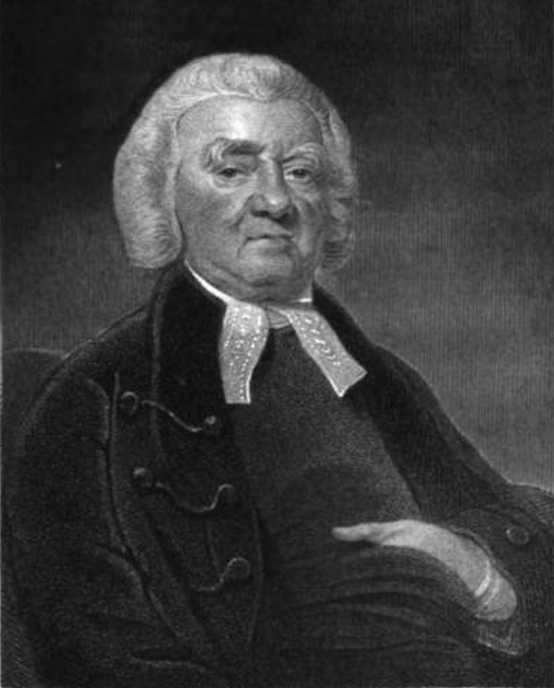
Samuel Parr, Head Master (1778–1785)

The system of education remained largely unchanged until the late 18th century. Samuel Parr, master from 1778 to 1785 was noted for his use of corporal punishment, commonplace at the time. One pupil remarked:

Parr's fame for severity spread a sort of panic through the city, especially among the mothers, who would sometimes interpose a remonstrance, which occasioned a ludicrous scene, but seldom availed the culprit, while the wiser were willing to leave their boys in his hands.

Richard Twining, the tea merchant, however, was advised by his brother John to send his eldest son to Norwich, writing of Parr, "I have been told that he flogs too much, but I doubt those from whom I have heard it think any use of punishment too much". Parr's daily teaching was interrupted at midday when he sent a boy to the pastry-cook's across the road for a pie, which he ate by the schoolroom fire. On the resignation of his headship in 1785, historian Warren Derry comments, "an object of terror was gone, but the glory of the place had gone with it".

John Crome, the landscape painter and founder of the Norwich School of painters, became a drawing master at the school at the beginning of the 19th century, a position he held for many years. The Norwich School of painters was the first provincial art movement in England, and Crome has been described as one of the most prominent British landscape painters alongside Constable and Gainsborough. Several notable artists of the movement were educated at the school including John Sell Cotman, James Stark, George Vincent, John Berney Crome, and Edward Thomas Daniell. Frederick Sandys, the "Norwich Pre-Raphaelite", who also attended the school, had his roots in the movement. Some staff, such as Dr. Samuel Forster, were associated with the movement; Forster was headteacher when John Sell Cotman attended the school. Forster became vice president of the Norwich Society of Artists, the society established in 1803 for artists of the movement. Charles Hodgson who taught mathematics and art, and his son David who taught art, were also supporters of Crome.

... he may visit the grammar school that has sent forth scholars, divines, warriors, and lawyers; a Keye, a Clarke, an Earle, a Nelson, and a Rajah Brooke, to spread its fame in the wide world. He may see in it a record of the days when grammar was forbidden to be taught elsewhere; he may peep through the oriels that look in upon the charnel-house of the ancient dead beneath; may feast his eyes upon the beauties of the Erpingham, and strange composite details of the Ethelbert gateways ...

— S. S. Madders, 1853, Rambles in an Old City, p. 5.

The number of pupils fluctuated significantly at the beginning of the 19th century, with usual numbers between 100 and 150 pupils, but falling to eight pupils in 1811 and 30 in 1859. Under the headship of the classical scholar Edward Valpy (1810–1829) pupil numbers increased and the school enjoyed a prosperous period, though its development was hindered by its charter whose trustees preferred to spend most of the £7,000 a year income on the Great Hospital, leaving £300 for the school. Valpy published a popular textbook on Latin style, Elegantiae Latinae (1803), which went through ten editions in his lifetime and The Greek Testament, with English notes, selected and original (1815) in three volumes. In 1837, in the wake of the Municipal Reform Act the patronage of the governors went to twenty-one independent trustees appointed by the Lord Chancellor, separating the governance of the school from the city corporation. As a result of a later 1858 court case Attorney-General v. Hudson the school became independent of the Great Hospital, gaining an endowment of its own and a Board of Governors to administer it. The original objects of the school to provide education for poor boys was abolished and replaced with boarding fees of £60 a year for sons of laymen, £45 for sons of clergymen, and 12 guineas a year for day pupils. A separate school was established to provide training for boys to enter industry and trade called the King Edward VI Middle School or Commercial School. Opened in 1862 and located in the cloisters of Blackfriars' it had 200 pupils and charged a tuition fee of four guineas a year.

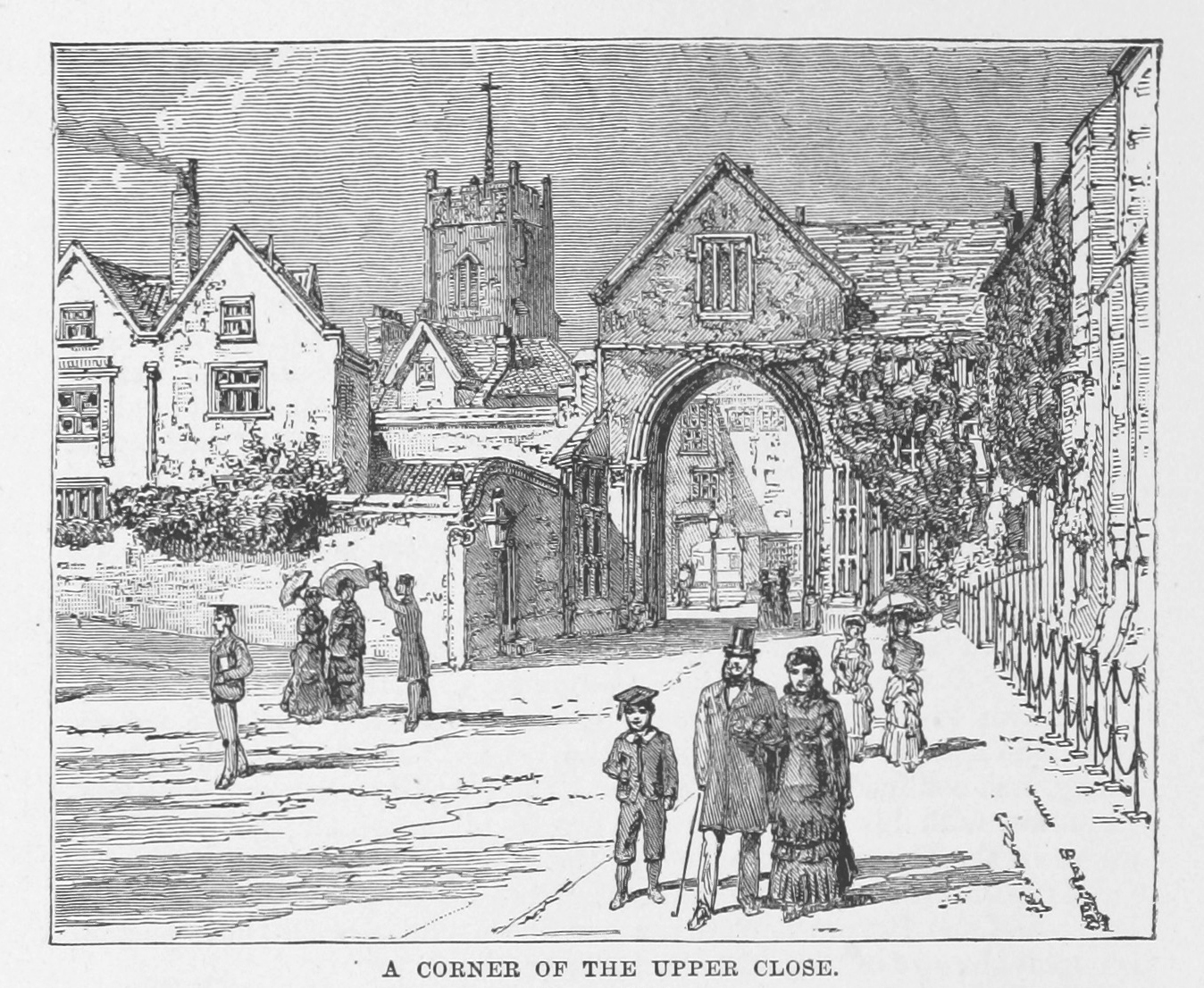
Illustration of the school from the Upper Close (1890)

By the mid-19th century the school failed to cater to the requirements of the new urban middle class due to its predominant focus on classical education and was perceived by the city's large Nonconformist community as too exclusively Anglican. The school, however, underwent dramatic reform under Augustus Jessopp, one of the great Victorian reforming headteachers, whose headship lasted from 1859 to 1879. Influenced by Thomas Arnold's reforms at Rugby and the new Victorian public schools, the school was remodelled into a public school. The curriculum was broadened to include non-classical subjects such as mathematics, drawing, German and French, as part of a trend seen in several schools including Marlborough College, Rossall, Wellington, Clifton and Richmond to establish modern departments where pupils would be allowed to omit learning Greek and follow a non-classical curriculum to fulfill the increasing demand for a "high" but less classical education. A strict moral code was instilled, the chapel becoming the focal point of school life, a prefectorial system was implemented to encourage leadership and responsibility, and there was a greater focus on sport which was thought to foster team spirit and individual initiative, reflecting the prevailing belief in muscular Christianity among educationalists.

The Schools Inquiry Commission (1864–1868), which examined endowed grammar schools under the chairmanship of Lord Taunton, reported that the school "gives the highest education in the county of Norfolk" and sent on average twice as many boys to university as all the other endowed schools in Norfolk each year. The commissioners also praised the Commercial School, despite it facing competition from similar schools: "the extent of its usefulness and the soundness of its practical teaching, is second to none". These reforms were accompanied by building expansion, such as the completion in 1860 of the Gothic Revival north wing of School House which contained a large dormitory for boarding pupils. By 1872 there were 127 pupils, 91 of whom were boarders who were drawn from all over the south-east of England. At the first meeting of the Headmasters' Conference in 1869 Jessopp represented Norwich School as one of the original thirteen members. Although successful his efforts were hindered by the effects of agricultural depression as four-fifths of endowment income came from land, and the school ultimately thrived as a city day school.

=== 20th century to present ===
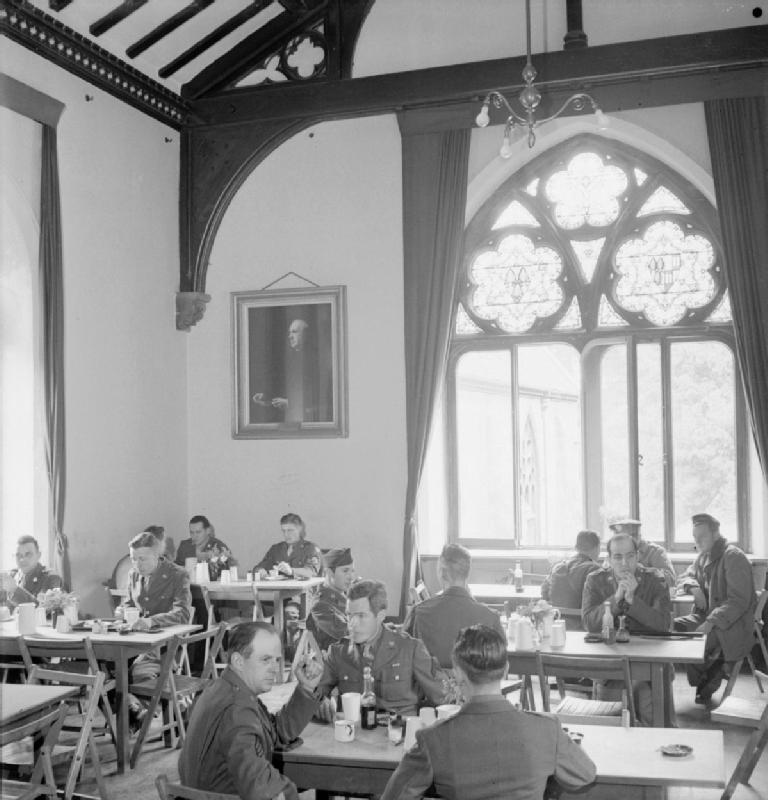
American service personnel relaxing in the Bishop's Palace during the Second World War. Today the room is a sixth form common room.

Extensive building development was completed in 1908, which included converting the chapel back to religious use, a redesigned School Lodge and a block of six classrooms designed by Edward Boardman called the New Buildings. To secure its finances the school accepted a grant from the Board of Education in return for offering 10 per cent of its intake to places funded by central government. The First World War saw the establishment of an Officers Training Corps company associated with the Norfolk Regiment, which disbanded in 1918. Pupil numbers grew steadily to 277 in 1930 and there was further modernisation of the curriculum. During the Second World War several buildings were destroyed in the Baedeker raids on Norwich, while School End House was commandeered by the Auxiliary Territorial Service and the Bishop's Palace was used by the American Red Cross. Inhumations were reportedly disturbed in 1939 when air-raid shelters were being dug on the current site of the playground, previously the old cathedral cemetery. In total, 102 pupils who attended the school died in the two world wars.

Post-war reconstruction was assisted by the Dean and Chapter who leased further buildings in the Close and the Worshipful Company of Dyers, one of the Livery Companies of the City of London, through HH Judge Norman Daynes, an ON and Prime Warden of the company. Though functional the new buildings had little aesthetic value; according to Pevsner they "spoil the North West part of the precinct beyond hope of redemption". The Dyers' continue to be a major benefactor of the school. Following the Education Act 1944 the school became a direct grant grammar school, increasing the number of free places to one quarter of its intake, however reverted to full independence when the scheme was phased out in 1975. A preparatory school called the Lower School was established in 1946, rebuilt in 1971 by architects Feilden and Mawson, and has undergone several extensions since. The 1950s saw a closer relationship with the Dean and Chapter following the merger of the choir school and the lease of the Bishop's Palace.

Boarding was phased out in 1989 and the buildings used for boarding, School House and the Bishop's Palace, were converted into teaching space. Girls were admitted to the sixth form for the first time in 1994, ending nearly 900 years of single-sex education. In 1999 the Daynes Sports Centre opened and the former gymnasium was converted into the Blake Drama Studio and two further laboratories. The same year the artists Cornford & Cross were commissioned by the Norwich Gallery to produce a series of sculptures beside the River Wensum. One of the works, Jerusalem, was installed on the school playing fields until July 2002. Part of the installation was later donated to the art department. In 2008 new science laboratories opened on St Faiths Lane in the south section of the Close. The facilities include a seismometer which is part of the British Geological Survey's schools network. That same year, the school began to admit girls below the sixth form for the first time, initially as young as age eleven. The next year, 2009, all school-age girls were eligible for admission. An eighth house called Seagrim, named after distinguished ONs Derek and Hugh Seagrim, was created in 2009. In 2011 the first female head of school in the school's history was chosen. In late 2013 work began to extend the Lower School. The extension of the Lower School was completed in 2018 when 4 changing rooms and a shower block had been converted into classrooms for roughly 60 pupils from Reception to Year 3. This has allowed pupils to enter the school at the age of 4 instead of 7. There are currently plans to build a new Refectory in the Senior School site to provide space for the evergrowing number of pupils at the school. There are plans in place for the old refectory (only meant to have been temporary when built) to be demolished and classrooms built in its place.

== Location and buildings ==
The school is principally located within the 44 acre (17.81 ha) cathedral close of Norwich Cathedral, known as "the Close", though over time has expanded beyond the precinct boundaries. In addition to the site next to the cathedral the Senior School uses buildings spread throughout the Close for teaching, many of which are listed buildings of historic interest, and several are scheduled monuments of national importance. The Lower School is located in the Lower Close between the east end of the cathedral and the River Wensum.

=== Chapel ===
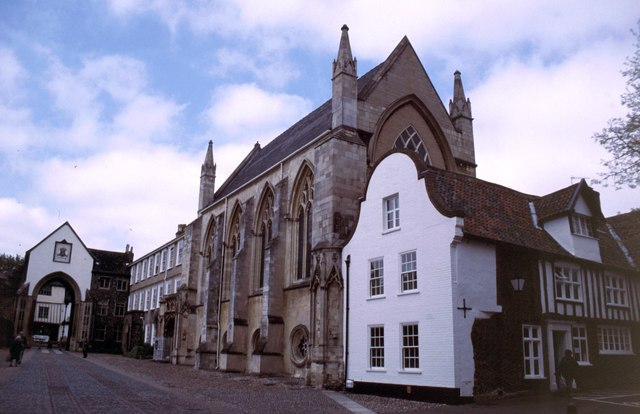
School chapel and adjoining buildings from the west door of Norwich Cathedral

The school chapel, located next to the Erpingham Gate and the west door of the cathedral in what was the west part of the cathedral cemetery, was originally the chantry chapel and college of St John the Evangelist built in 1316 by John Salmon, Bishop of Norwich, who specified that;

... in this chapel we ordain that there shall be for ever four priests, and we decree that they shall celebrate for our souls and for the souls of our father and mother, Solomon and Amice, and for the souls of our predecessors and successors the Bishops of Norwich ... The said priests, however, in the buildings built by us next the Chapel for their use, shall dwell and remain eating and drinking together and living in common.

Also known as the Carnary chapel and college, the complex was originally formed of separate buildings which were later joined. The entrance porch to the chapel was added between 1446 and 1472 during the episcopate of Walter Lyhart, Bishop of Norwich. The crypt beneath the chapel was used as a charnel house administered by the sacristan of the cathedral which stored the bones of people buried in the churches of the city to await resurrection, and the ocular windows of the chapel would allow visitors to view the charnel remains. From 1421 to 1476 the crypt was also the location of the Wodehous chantry, established by Henry V at the request of John Wodehous, a veteran of the Battle of Agincourt. The college was dissolved in 1547 during the English Reformation by the Abolition of Chantries Act before being purchased by the city in 1550, and used by the school shortly after. Until the 19th century the chapel was used as the main classroom, though it was not until 1908 the chapel returned to the role of religious assembly and 1940 when it was consecrated for use as a church, due to the cost of refurbishment.

The chapel is constructed from stone with a plain tiled roof and comprises four bays above a four bay twin-aisled undercroft. The windows originally contained the names and arms of benefactors who contributed to the renovation of the chapel after its purchase by the city and the imperial crown of Edward VI, but by the 19th century many had been lost. Blomefield's History of the County of Norfolk, compiled in the 18th century, identifies the coat of arms of the Drapers, Grocers, and St George's arms; with the family arms of the Palmers, Symbarbs and the Ruggs. Following renovations carried out in 1937–40 six windows contain stained glass panels mainly depicting shields. Among those that can be seen today are the coat of arms of the Worshipful Company of Dyers, and a shield carrying the Latin motto Par Fama Labori which literally translates to "Fame is equal to the toil". The motto, which comes from the Satires of Horace, has been taken out of context as in the poem Horace explains that fame never corresponds to the effort one has made. The art historian Eric Fernie suggests the style of the chapel is firmly within the palatial tradition of two-storey chapels along with the Palatine Chapel, Aachen, La Sainte-Chapelle and the Royal Chapel of St Stephen. In contrast archaeologist Roberta Gilchrist suggests that the design was influenced by the "visual culture of medieval death", its architecture holding additional iconographic meaning connected to its use for storage of charnel. The old charnel house is a scheduled monument and the chapel above is a Grade I listed building.

=== Erpingham Gate and St Ethelbert's Gate ===
The Erpingham Gate is the primary entrance to the north section of the Close, directly opposite the west door of the cathedral. It was commissioned by Sir Thomas Erpingham, a commander in the Battle of Agincourt and was constructed between 1416 and 1425. The top of the arch contains a canopied niche which is thought originally to have been dedicated to the Five Holy Wounds of Christ, flanked by the Four Evangelists and with the Holy Trinity above, but was replaced in the 18th century with a kneeling statue of Erpingham wearing armour and surcoat with a collar of Esses and the Order of the Garter below his left knee. The rest of the gateway is decorated with the coat of arms of Erpingham and members of his family, together with his motto yenk (think) on small scrolls. It has been restored several times: first in the 18th century, then by E. W. Tristram in 1938 and again by Feilden and Mawson in 1989. It is a scheduled monument and adjoins School House and the Music School, which occupy 70 and 71 The Close respectively.

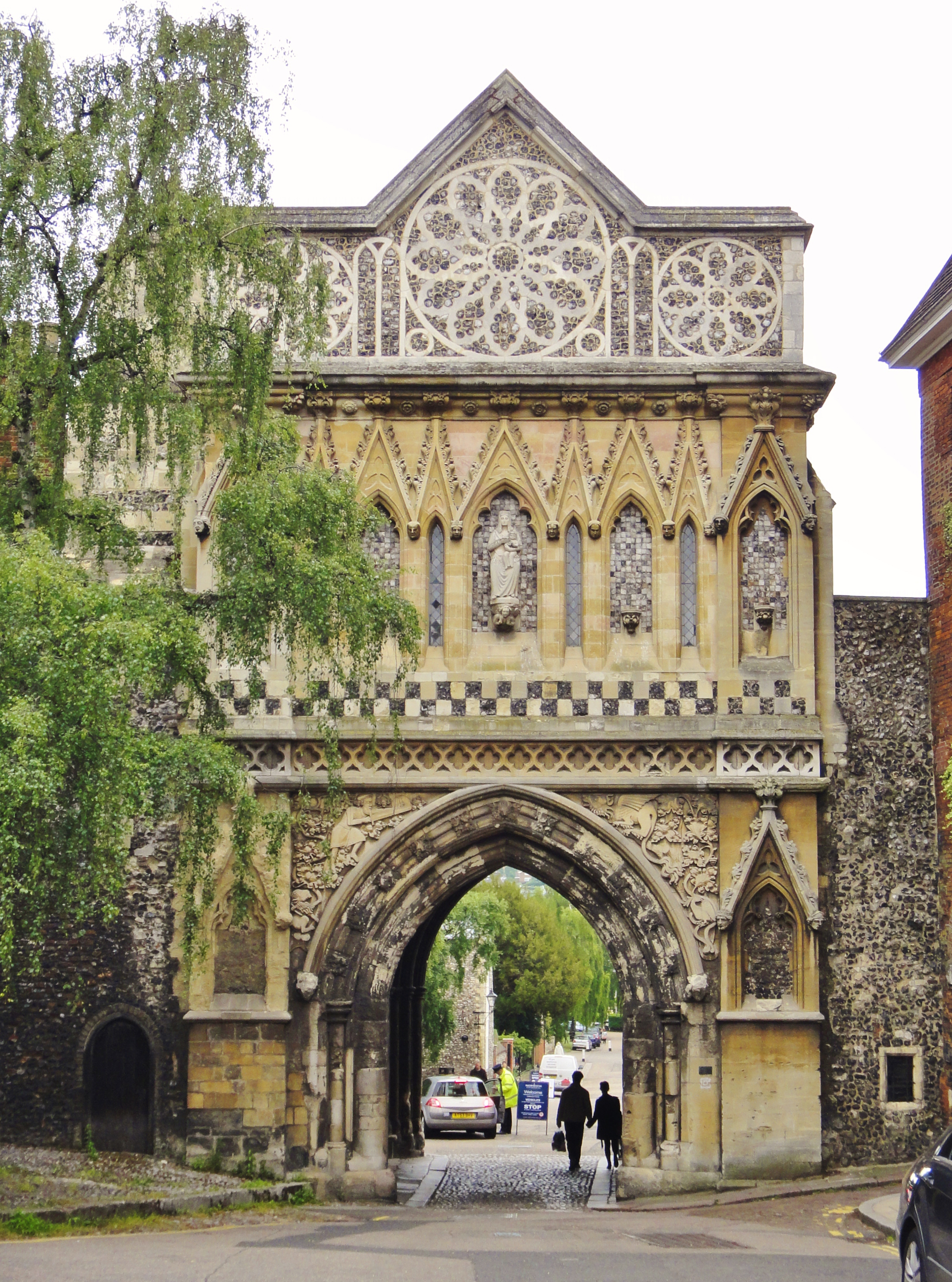
St Ethelbert's Gate from outside the Close

St Ethelbert's Gate is one of the entrances to the south section of the Close. The room above the gateway was originally a chapel dedicated to Saint Ethelbert the King and came to be used by the school in 1944. It was used as an art room before its conversion into the Barbirolli music practice room, named after Lady Barbirolli, under Philip Stibbe's headship (1975–1984), a project financed by the Dyers. A scheduled monument, the gateway was built in 1316 by the citizens of Norwich as penance for a riot in 1272 which damaged many of the priory buildings. It was substantially restored in 1815 by William Wilkins, an Old Norvicensian, and underwent further renovations in 1964 which saw the stonework and carvings replaced under the supervision of Sir Bernard Feilden. Art historian Veronica Sekules describes the St Ethelbert's Gate as it was in the 14th century as "a highly decorative building presenting a façade rich in images, which the cathedral otherwise lacked. In a sense it would have operated as a principal façade and, in as far as one can glean from the remaining images, it communicated a strong message designating the gate as the opening to hallowed ground beyond."

=== Nelson's statue ===
The Grade II listed statue of Lord Nelson, an Old Norvicensian, was sculpted by Thomas Milnes in 1847. Milnes was later asked to model the lions for the base of Nelson's Column in Trafalgar Square, but the commission was eventually given to Sir Edwin Landseer. Nelson is depicted in vice admiral full-dress uniform, with epaulettes and three stars on the cuff, resting a telescope on a cannon with a hawser at his feet. He lost most of his right arm in 1797, shown by his empty right sleeve which is pinned to his uniform to support the cloak which falls from his left shoulder. The octagonal granite plinth is inscribed with "Nelson". It was originally located outside the Norwich Guildhall but was relocated to its current site next to the school in the Upper Close in 1856 at the suggestion of the sculptor Richard Westmacott the Younger.

=== Other buildings ===
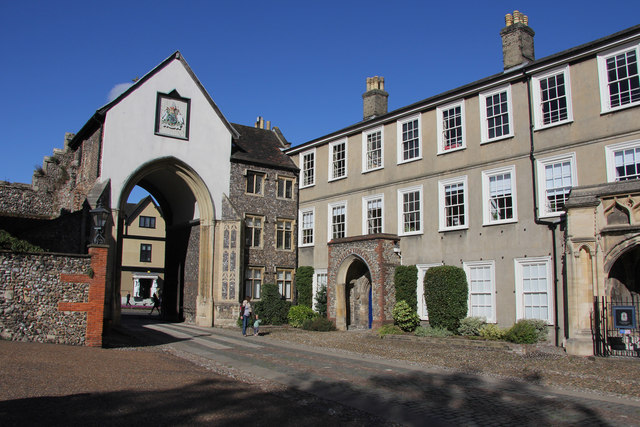
Erpingham Gate and School House from within the Close

School House, 70 The Close, was formerly part of the Carnary college but now contains classrooms and school offices. While much of the building dates to around 1830, extensive 14th and 15th century features remain such as the stone entrance archway. The building, which is Grade I listed, adjoins the Erpingham Gate and is three storeys high and has eight bays. School End House, 69 The Close, is a 17th-century timber-framed house built against the east end of the school chapel. Formerly a home, the Grade I listed building is now the senior common room for staff and a school office. The entrance is pilastered and is surrounded by lion-mask roundels. The Music School, 71 The Close, was built in 1626–28 as a home for the prebendaries of the cathedral, funded by the chapter. Typical of the period, the Grade II* listed building was constructed from flint-rubble, brick, and reused materials from monastic buildings in the Close. It replaced an earlier house and incorporates the remains of a medieval free-standing bell tower originating in the 12th or 13th century, rebuilt around 1300 and largely demolished by 1580.

The Bishop's Palace was built on the site of the former Anglo-Saxon parish church of Holy Trinity. The primary wing was completed during Bishop de Losinga's episcopate (1091–1119). Bishops Suffield (1244–1257) and Salmon (1298–1325) developed the palace and its grounds substantially. Under Bishop Salmon the palace underwent ambitious expansion, possibly prompted by damage from the riot of 1272 and his personal success of being elected as Lord Chancellor to Edward III in 1319. The main feature of the original palace was a three-storey fortified tower which was directly connected to the cathedral, drawing upon the precedent of Carolingian imperial palaces. In c. 1858 the building underwent major restoration under the supervision of Ewan Christian. The building came to be used by the school in 1958. Today the building contains classrooms where mathematics and geography are taught, the junior common room (for sixth form pupils) and libraries in the former parlour and undercroft.

The former private chapel of Edward Reynolds, Bishop of Norwich, was built in 1662 almost entirely at his own expense. It replaced an earlier chapel which had been severely damaged by a mob during Bishop Hall's episcopate (1641–1656). Constructed from stone with a plain tile roof, it annexes the Bishop's Palace. There is a coat of arms above the doorway but it is badly weathered. The Grade II* listed building was previously used by the dean and chapter for the storage of records and came to be used as a library by the school under S. M. Andrews' headship (1967–1975) following renovations funded by the Dyers.

== Organisation and administration ==
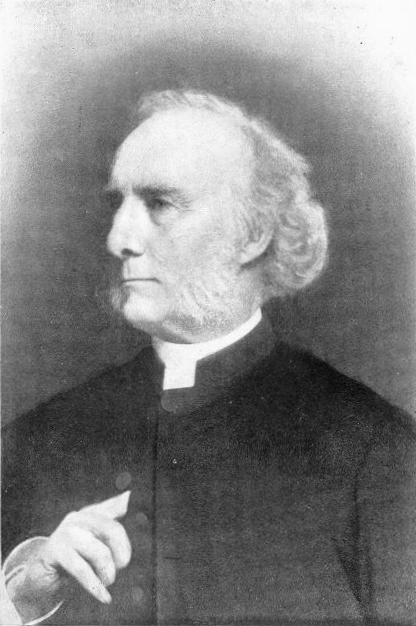
Augustus Jessopp, Head Master (1859–1879) and chairman of the governors (1900–1903)

The school is divided into the Lower School, a preparatory feeder school which has around 250 pupils from ages 4 to 11, and the Senior School which has around 850 pupils aged from 12 to 18. Like many other independent schools the school has its own distinctive names for year groups called "forms". The school's academic year is divided into three terms: Michaelmas term, from early September to mid-December; Lent term, from early January to mid-March; and Trinity term, from mid-April to early July. In the middle of each term there is a week-long half-term holiday. The pupils receive an extra week of holiday in the three major holidays between terms, compared to most state schools of England. The school is a registered charity. The school's charitable work includes financial and practical support of the Diskit Monastery and the GTC Monastic School in Ladakh, India, a primary school and health centre in Zambia and a community centre in Boulogne Sur Mer, Argentina.

The headmaster is a member of the Headmasters' and Headmistresses' Conference and is responsible to the governors for the whole school from 4 to 18, though is primarily based in the Senior School. Housemasters are managed by the principal deputy head, who is accountable to the headteacher for the pastoral care and discipline of the school, as well as for much of the rest of the school's non-academic activity. The governors form the Board of Governors, also known as the Council of Management, which meets each term and is headed by a chairman. Past chairmen have included Donald Dalrymple ON, physician and Liberal MP for Bath (1868–73), J. J. Colman, head of the Colman's mustard company and Liberal MP for Norwich (1890–1898), Augustus Jessopp (1900–1903), James Stuart, founder of the University Extension Movement and Rector of the University of St Andrews (1903–1913), E. E. Blyth, first Lord Mayor of Norwich (1913–1934), David Cranage, Dean of Norwich (1934–1945), and General Manager of Norwich Union E. F. Williamson (1945–1954). The current chairman is P. J. E. Smith. Several governor positions are appointed by organisations closely connected to the school. The dean and chapter of Norwich Cathedral appoint one governor, and the Worshipful Company of Dyers appoint three. The school's historical connection with the Dyers, one of the Livery Companies of the City of London, dates back to 1947 when HH Judge Norman Daynes, an Old Norvicensian, was the Prime Warden of the company. The charitable trust of the Company continues to be a major benefactor of the school through the funding of building expansion and bursaries. The school is also a member of the Choir Schools' Association and the Lower School is a member of the Independent Association of Prep Schools.

The school is selective; admission is based on assessments in English, mathematics and reasoning, an academic reference from the applicant's current school and an interview. The main entry point to enter the Lower School is at age 4 (Reception), age 7 (Year 3), and ages 11 (Year 7), 13 (Year 9) and 16 to enter the Senior School. There are academic, music and other scholarships which reduce school fees by up to one-fifth, as well as means-tested bursaries up to the entirety of school fees. In addition, the charitable trust of the Dyers' provide a bursary to cover half the school fees of one pupil in each academic year. Cathedral choristers also receive bursaries which cover half of school fees through the Norwich Cathedral Choir Endowment Fund. The fees for the 2013/2014 academic year for the Lower School were £11,997 per annum (£3,999 per term), and £13,167 per annum (£4,389 per term) for the Senior School. However, the fees for the 2018/2019 academic year are £11,493 per annum for Pre-prep, £15,441 per annum for Years 3-6 and £16,941 per annum for pupils in the Senior School The school also charges fees for lunches and entries for public examinations.

Here are the latest academic results:

A-Level (2022): 65.64% A*-A

GCSE (2022): 80.70% 9–7

== School life ==
Norwich Cathedral is used by the school on weekdays for morning assemblies and events throughout the academic year. The choristers of the cathedral are also educated at the school. The school has a Christian ethos, and emphasises Christian values such as love and compassion as underpinning its activities. Tatler describes the school as "fantastically unstuffy". Former headteacher, Chris Brown, in an interview as chairman of the HMC in 2001 commented that the school does not fit the stereotype of a public school but is better described as an "independent grammar" because of the school's philanthropy and outreach in the community. Richard Harries, author of one of the school's histories argues that due to the evolution of the school it does not fit either public or grammar school stereotypes and that it is most properly described as an independent school among "the distinguished group of City independent schools", such as City of London School and Manchester Grammar School.

=== Curriculum ===
In Upper Four (Year 8) and below pupils study a broad curriculum including Latin and two modern languages. By Lower 5 (year 9) students have the opportunity to start dropping certain subjects, for example, dropping a language. There is also a programme of games at all levels, and in the fourth and fifth forms an ICT programme and a general course called "Curriculum vitae" (not to be mistaken with a written form known as a CV) which covers Personal, Social and Health Education (PSHE) topics, study skills and subjects such as philosophy and Mandarin. Pupils are required to take at least ten General Certificate of Secondary Education (GCSE) and IGCSE subjects in Middle Five (Year 10) and Upper Five (Year 11).

In the sixth form, pupils usually study four or five AS-level (the equivalent of half an A-level qualification) subjects for one year, and most continue with three subjects to A-level. Many also take the Extended Project Qualification (EPQ). In total, 25 subjects are offered at A-level. Sixth-formers must also take part in a community service programme where pupils volunteer in various local organisations around the city.

Academically, the school is one of the highest performing independent schools in the country. In 2010, 2011 and 2012 The Daily Telegraph ranked its A-Level results as 93rd, 78th and 38th respectively among independent schools in the UK. Almost all sixth form pupils go to university upon leaving the school. Around 41 per cent enter courses in humanities and social sciences, 24 per cent in science and engineering, 15 per cent in arts subjects, 13 per cent in medicine, dentistry and veterinary science and 7 per cent in vocational subjects such as business, management, physiotherapy and sports science. Large numbers of pupils gain entrance to "golden triangle", Russell Group and other top universities.

The school also runs student exchanges with schools in France, Germany, Spain and Liechtenstein, and there are numerous trips overseas. In addition, the school offers the Duke of Edinburgh's Award and the Young Enterprise scheme.

=== Houses ===
The pastoral care of the school is organised by a house system, first implemented under the headship of W. F. Brown in 1912. Pupils are allocated to one of the eight houses upon joining the Senior School, or one of the three houses in the Lower School, and stay with that house as they move up through the year groups. Each house is run by a housemaster, who is also an active member of the teaching staff. Each year group within a house, called a tutor group, is run by a tutor who monitors pupils' academic progress, general welfare and extra-curricular involvement. The tutor, who is the first point of contact for pastoral and academic matters, sees everyone in the tutor group daily for registration and weekly for a longer tutor period. In the Lower School the houses are named after the historic gates of Norwich: Conisford, Heigham and Magdalen. In the Senior School the houses are named after distinguished Old Norvicensians, Head Masters and benefactors of the school, with the exception of School house, and each is designated a colour:

- Brooke, formed in 1912, is named after Sir James Brooke, first Rajah of Sarawak.
- Coke, formed in 1945, is named after the jurist Sir Edward Coke.
- Nelson, formed in 1912, is named after Horatio Nelson, 1st Viscount Nelson.
- Parker, formed in 1912, is named after Matthew Parker, Archbishop of Canterbury who was a major benefactor of the school.
- Repton, formed in 1975, is named after Humphry Repton, landscape gardener.
- School owes name to its origins as a boarding house. (Note: In 19th-century boarding schools the boarding house which had the headteacher as its housemaster was traditionally called "the school house". Though the headteacher no longer functions as a housemaster, the name has persisted.)
- Seagrim, formed in 2009, is named after Derek and Hugh Seagrim, who have the distinction as the only siblings to have been awarded the Victoria Cross and George Cross respectively.
- Valpy, formed in 1962, is named after Edward Valpy, 19th-century headteacher.

=== Traditions ===
Trafalgar Day is marked on 21 October each year with a service held in the cathedral to honour Lord Nelson who attended the school as a boarding pupil from 1768 to 1769 under the headship of Edmond Simmons. Following the service the entire school gathers at Nelson's statue in the Close where there is the laying of wreaths accompanied by the Last Post. Each year a concert is held in recognition of the Dyers' which takes place in St James Garlickhythe, London or the school chapel. A House Music choral and instrumental competition, known as 'House Shout', takes place each year between the houses and culminates in an event in St Andrews Hall. Since 1915 there has been an annual race called the Cup Run, a successor of the game of hare and hounds which was a popular activity at the school. The six or seven mile course was originally near Trowse, but today the event is held at Mousehold Heath in Norwich. Sports day, first held in June 1861, occurs in Trinity term each year.

== Extracurricular activities ==
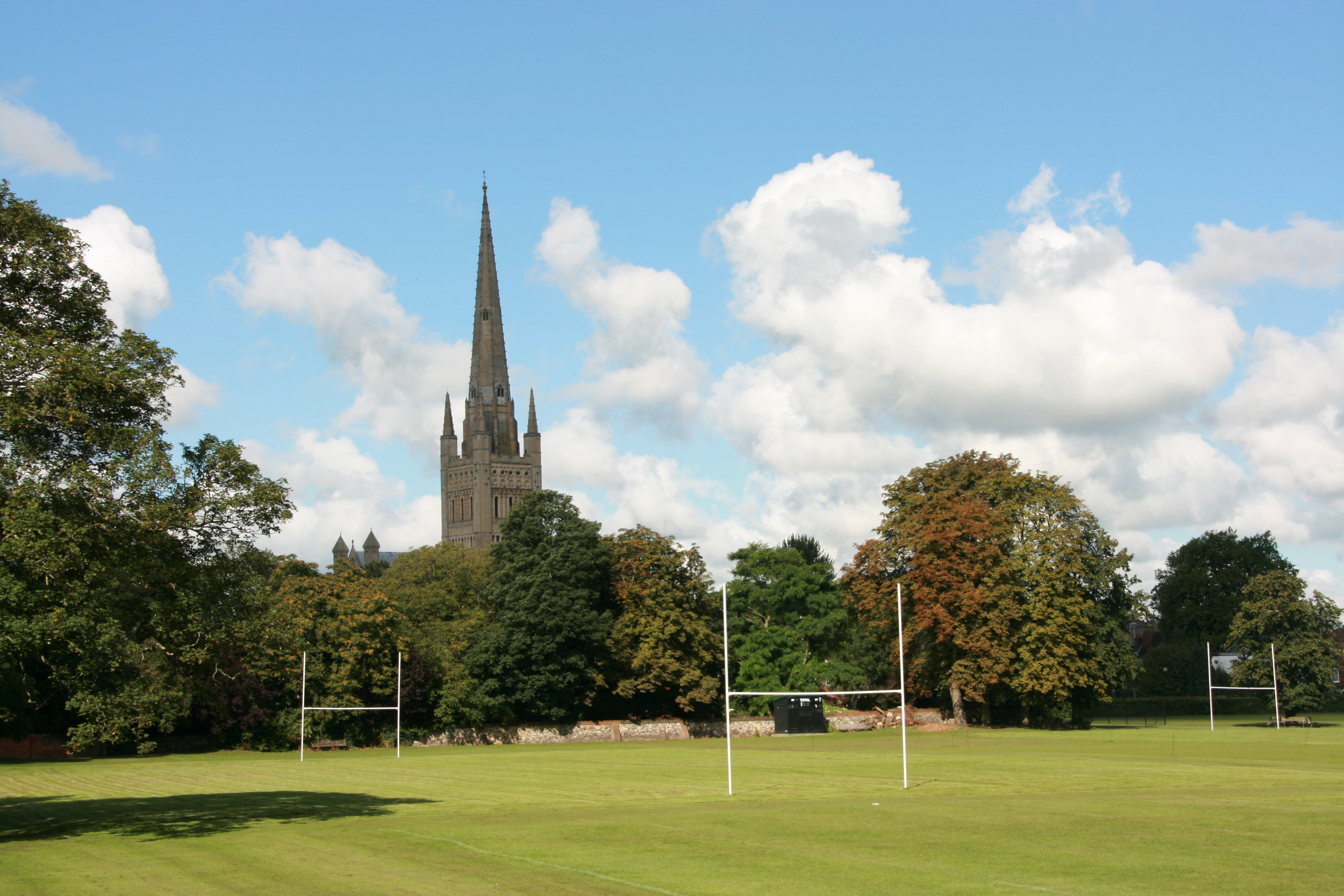
Playing fields in the Lower Close

The school owns a gymnasium, a tennis court and two sports grounds, one in the Lower Close and the other just north of the city. The main sports for boys are rugby (which replaced football as a main sport in 1922), hockey and cricket; for girls, they are hockey, netball and rounders. The school also excels in fencing, cross-country, athletics, tennis, and rowing. The rowing club was revived under A. Stephenson's headship (1943–1967), and has since competed at major regattas such as the Henley Royal Regatta. Other sports offered include: swimming, sailing, football, kayaking, cycling, martial arts, orienteering, shooting, squash and badminton.

Nearly two-thirds of pupils play instruments or sing regularly in orchestras, bands and choirs, and around 26 music groups rehearse weekly at the school. There is an annual music tour to various European cities during the Easter holiday which has performed in venues such as St Peter's Basilica, St Mark's Basilica and Brussels Cathedral. There are a number of plays, drama evenings and musicals each year: the Senior Play is performed in the Maddermarket Theatre, the Junior Play at the Norwich Puppet Theatre, while the annual musical is performed at the Norwich Playhouse. The school helps organise an annual arts festival from late June to early July for young people in the county. The inaugural festival in 2013 was officially launched by Dame Judi Dench and included partnerships with EPIC Studios, The Garage, Norfolk County Music Service, Norwich Cathedral, Norwich Puppet Theatre, Norwich Sound & Vision, the Sainsbury Centre for Visual Arts, Sistema in Norwich, Writers' Centre Norwich, in addition to events run by the school.

There are many societies reflecting pupils' interests, including creative writing, Thomas Browne (philosophy), politics, Amnesty International, conservation, and sewing societies. Several societies have been operating under various guises since the end of the Second World War, such as the History, Chess and Film clubs. In addition the Appeals Committee has been operating since 1964 to raise money in aid of good causes.

The 8th Norwich Sea Scout Group and Octavi Explorer Scout Unit are sponsored by Norwich School and membership is primarily for members of the school. The group has a combined membership of 300 and is one of about one hundred Sea Scout groups in the country recognised by the Royal Navy, for which it receives a number of privileges such as wearing the Royal Navy Pennant, flying the defaced Red Ensign and access to additional funding. The group is also a Royal Yachting Association Training Centre, and runs courses for dinghy sailing, powerboating and marine VHF radio, in addition to offering British Canoe Union star awards. In 2013 the group celebrated its 90th anniversary since becoming linked with the school in 1923 under G. A. Williamson. However, the school claims that the group may have first gathered as early as 1908 at the beginning of the scouting movement.

== Notable people ==
=== Alumni ===
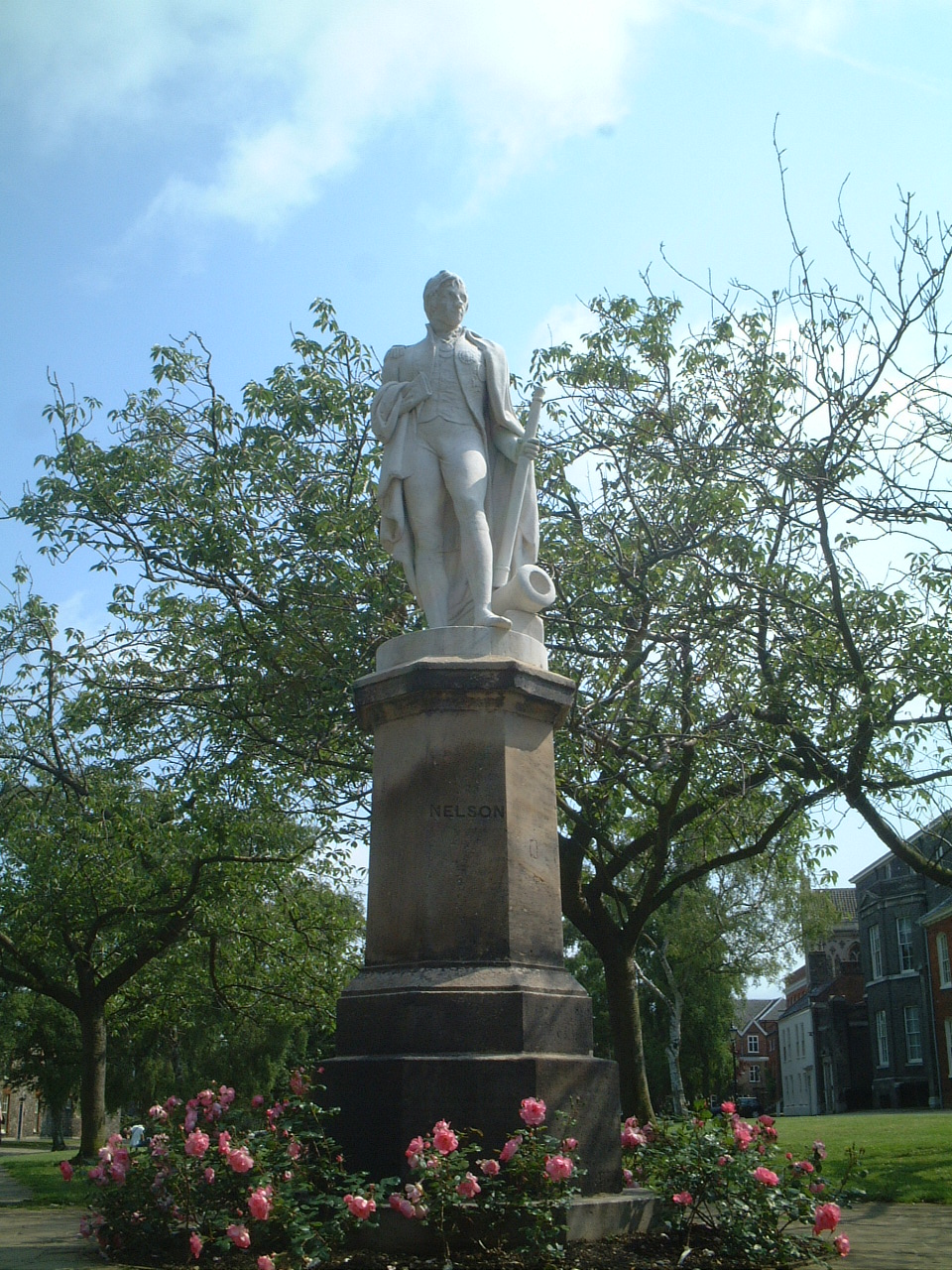
Statue of Lord Nelson in the Upper Close

Past pupils of Norwich School are known as Old Norvicensians (ONs). Over the years the school has educated a number of notable figures, including Lord Nelson, the jurist Sir Edward Coke, Rajah of Sarawak Sir James Brooke, philosopher Samuel Clarke, former Deputy Chairman of the Conservative Party Michael Ashcroft, author George Borrow and 2010 World Time Trial Champion cyclist Emma Pooley. Distinguished ONs in science include Joe Farman, co-discover of the Antarctic ozone hole, Tom Cavalier-Smith, emeritus professor at the University of Oxford, historical ecologist Oliver Rackham, and at least 18 Fellows of the Royal Society among others. Three ONs have been awarded the Victoria Cross, of whom Derek and Hugh Seagrim have the distinction as the only siblings to have been awarded the Victoria Cross and George Cross respectively. In the arts, several members of the Norwich School art movement were alumni including John Sell Cotman and John Berney Crome, Greek Revival architect William Wilkins, Frederick Sandys, the "Norwich Pre-Raphaelite", maverick architectural theorist and historian of the post-war period Reyner Banham, and the 20th-century Post-Impressionist painter, Edward Seago.

=== Staff ===
Headteachers, historically known as the "Master" and now as the "Head Master", have included Vincent of Scarning, the earliest known headteacher (c. 1240), author Samuel Hoadly (1700–1705), Whig writer Samuel Parr (1778–1785), classicists Edward Valpy (1810–1829) and Thomas Kidd, writer George William Lemon, first principal of the University of Sydney John Woolley (1849–1852), historian Augustus Jessopp (1859–1880), author O. W. Tancock (1880–1890), clergyman Theodore Acland (1930–1943), and former Chindit and author Philip Stibbe (1975–1984). Past principal deputy heads, a post historically known as "usher", have included Archbishop of Armagh John Hoadly, writer William Beloe, author and clergyman Henry Stebbing (1825–1826), and clergyman Cecil Matthews (1903–1907). Other notable staff have included John Crome, founder of the Norwich School of painters, classicist G. A. Williamson (1922–1960), and historian and current Director of Studies David N. Farr.

=== Old Norvicensian Society ===
ONs may join the Old Norvicensian Society, an association for former pupils. Predecessors in the 18th and 19th centuries include the Parrian Club, a dining society for former pupils of Samuel Parr's headship, and the Valpeian Club, after Edward Valpy. In 1866, the latter was replaced by The Norwich School Club which gave rise to the current association for former pupils, which emerged at the beginning of the 20th century.

== Racism scandal ==
In June 2020, an open letter was written by three former pupils, and signed by 264 pupils, ex-pupils and parents, calling on the school to implement changes after many experienced racial abuse. The letter details accounts of 35 staff and pupils' experiences of racism within the school, with perpetrators including staff and pupils.

The female diversity officer, hired September 2020 in response to the above, resigned after only seven months in the role.

== See also ==
- List of the oldest schools in the United Kingdom
