= List of masters of Gonville and Caius College, Cambridge =

The Master is the head of Gonville and Caius College, Cambridge and chairs the college council and governing body of the college. The following have served as Masters of Gonville and Caius College, or its forerunner, Gonville Hall.

== List of masters ==
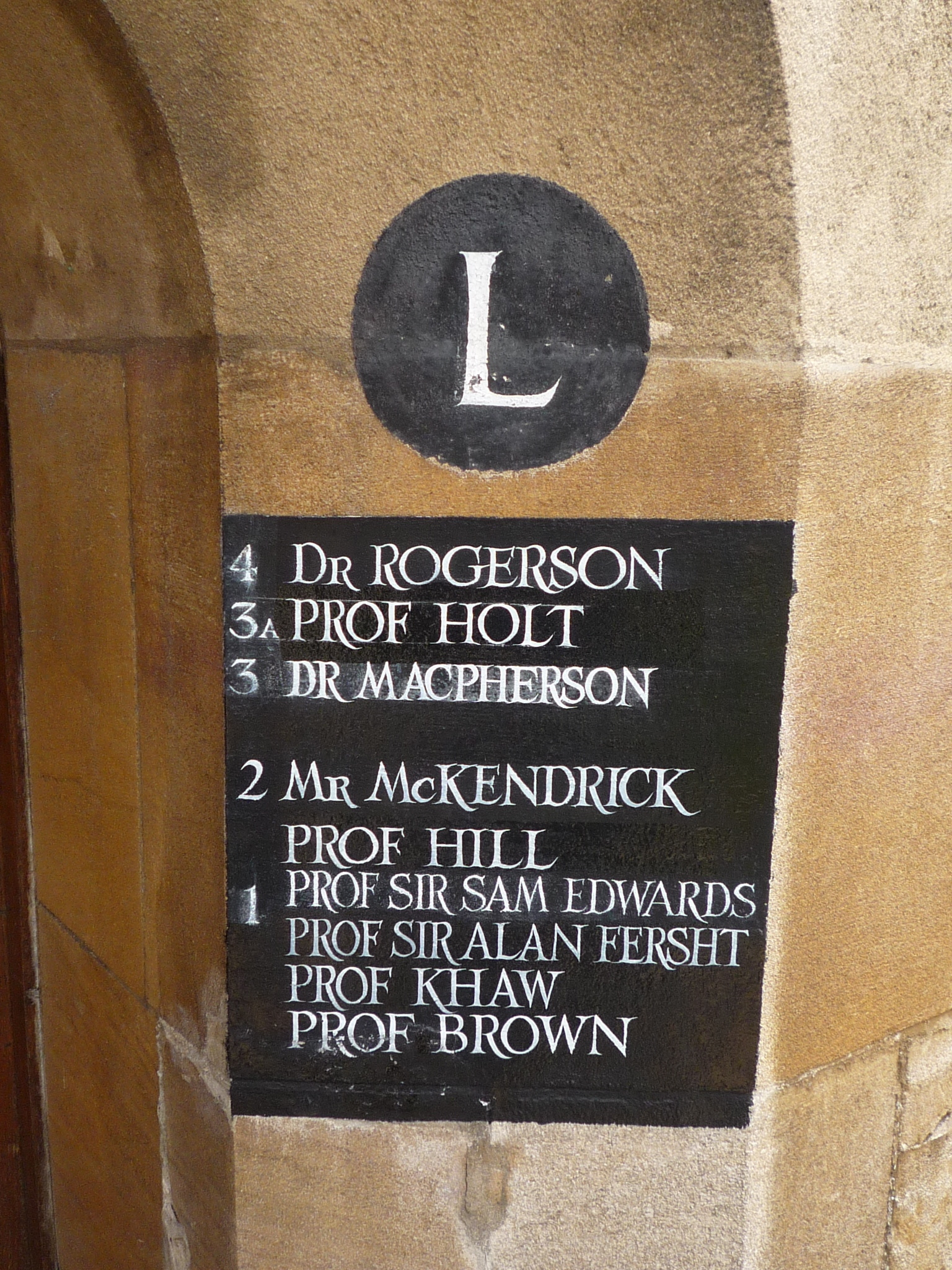
Staircaise L at Gonville and Caius College, Cambridge in 2010, housing the offices of former master Neil McKendrick, then future masters Sir Alan Fersht and Pippa Rogerson, and former presidents Iain Macpherson and Sir Sam Edwards.

List of masters
Gonville Hall
Name	Master between		Notes	Ref(s).	
John Colton	4 June 1349	c. 1360	First Master of Gonville Hall		
William Rougham (Note: A History of Gonville and Caius College does not include William Rougham as Master. It is thought more likely Richard Pulham served as Master from an earlier point.(Christopher Brooke, 1985; ISBN 978-0-85115-423-7))	c. 1360	1393	He finished the College Chapel		
Richard Pulham	1393	1412			
William Somersham	1412	1416			
John Rickingale	1416	1426	Chancellor of the University (1416-22), Chancellor of York, Bishop of Chichester		
Thomas Attwood	1426	1456			
Thomas Boleyn	c. 1456	1471/2			
Edmund Sheriffe	1472	1476/7			
Henry Costessey	c. 1477	1483			
John Barly	1483	1504/05			
Edmund Stubb	1504/5	1513/14			
William Buckenham	1513/14	1536			
John Skypp	1536	1540 resigned			
John Styrmin	1540	1552†			
Thomas Bacon	1552	1558			
Gonville and Caius College
Name	Image	Master between		Notes	Ref(s).
Thomas Bacon		4 September 1557 (continued)	1 January 1559†		
John Caius		24 January 1559	27 June 1573 (nominated Legge)		
Thomas Legge		27 June 1573	12 July 1607†		
William Branthwaite		14 December 1607	January 1619†		
John Gostlin		16 February 1619	21 October 1626†		
Thomas Batchcroft		22 October 1626	15 April 1649 (expelled)		
William Dell		4 May 1649	11 May 1660 (resigned)		
Thomas Batchcroft		11 May 1660 (restored)	1 December 1660 (resigned)		
Robert Brady		1 December 1660	19 August 1700†		
James Halman		24 August 1700	23 December 1702†		
Sir John Ellys		1 January 1703	29 November 1716†		
Sir Thomas Gooch		29 November 1716	14 February 1754†		
Sir James Burrough		27 February 1754	7 August 1764†		
John Smith		17 August 1764	17 June 1795†		
Richard Fisher Belward		1 July 1795	16 May 1803†		
Martin Davy		31 May 1803	18 May 1839†		
Benedict Chapman		11 June 1839	23 October 1852†		
Edwin Guest		4 November 1852	8 October 1880 (resigned)		
Norman Macleod Ferrers		27 October 1880	31 January 1903†		
Ernest Stewart Roberts		16 February 1903	16 June 1912†		
Sir Hugh Kerr Anderson		2 July 1912	2 November 1928†		
John Forbes Cameron		23 November 1928	30 September 1948		
Sir James Chadwick		1948	1959		
Sir Nevill Francis Mott		1959	1966		
Joseph Needham		1966	1976		
Sir William Wade		1976	1988		
Peter Gray		1988	1996		
Neil McKendrick		1 October 1996	2006		
Sir Christopher Hum		2006	2012		
Sir Alan Fersht		1 October 2012	30 September 2018		
Pippa Rogerson		1 October 2018	30 September 2025		
Richard Gilbertson		1 October 2025	Incumbent		

== Presidents of Fellows ==
The following have served as the president of Fellows of Gonville and Caius College, Cambridge from the given date.

President	Term of office
James Burrough	1751–1754 (elected Master)
John Smith	1754–1764 (elected Master)
Joshua White	1764–1766
Charles Carver	1766–1767
James Hicks	1767–1769
Bartholomew Edwards	1769–1782
Samuel Reeve	1782–1789†
Richard Fisher Belward	1790–1795 (elected Master)
Thomas Cooke Burroughes	1795–1797
Martin Davy	1798–1803 (elected Master)
John Drew Borton	1803–1805
Jeremy Day	1819–1821
Hamnet Holditch	1835–1867†
Benjamin Heath Drury	1868–1875
Alfred George Day	1875–1877
Benjamin Heath Drury	1877–1894
Ernest Stewart Roberts	1894–1903 (elected Master)
John Venn	1903–1923†
Edward John Gross	April–Aug. 1923†
William Warwick Buckland	1923–1946†
F. J. M. Stratton	1946–1948
Edwin Keppel Bennett	1948–1956
Sir Ronald Fisher	1956–1959
Joseph Needham	1959–1966 (elected Master)
Philip Grierson	1966–1976
Michael Prichard	1976–1980
Iain Macpherson	1980–1992
Sir Sam Edwards	1992–1997
James Fitzsimons	1997–2005
W. Yao Liang	2005–2013
John Mollon	2013–2021
Peter Robinson	2021–
