= Thomas Attwood =

Thomas Attwood may refer to:

- Thomas Attwood (composer) (1765–1838), English composer and organist
- Thomas Attwood (economist) (1783–1856), British banker, economist, political campaigner and Member of Parliament
- Thomas Warr Attwood (c. 1733–1775), English builder, architect and local politician
- Thomas Attwood (Master of Gonville Hall) (died 1454), priest and academic

== See also ==
- Thomas Atwood (disambiguation)
- Thomas Attwood Walmisley (1814–1856), English composer and organist
