= Rougham =

Rougham may refer to:

- Rougham, Norfolk, England
- Rougham, Suffolk, England
- Rougham, County Cork, a townland in Ireland, see List of townlands of the barony of Bear
- William Rougham, the second master of Gonville Hall, Cambridge
