= Edmund Sheriffe =

Edmund Sheriffe was a priest and academic in the 15th century.

Sheriffe was a prebendary of Lincoln Cathedral from 1458; Rector of Little Billing from 1467; Archdeacon of Stow from 1471 and Master of Gonville Hall, Cambridge from 1472, holding all four positions until his death on 29 September 1475.

Academic offices
Preceded by Thomas Boleyn	Master of Master of Gonville Hall; 1472-1475	Succeeded by Henry Costessey
