= Pippa Rogerson =

British solicitor and academic

Philippa Jane Rogerson
- Education: Newnham College, Cambridge (BA, PhD)
- Occupation(s): Solicitor, academic
- Years active: 1986–present
- Employer: University of Cambridge
- Known for: First female Master of Gonville and Caius College, Cambridge
- Notable work: Collier's Conflict of Laws (4th ed., 2013)
- Children: 5

Philippa Jane Rogerson is a British solicitor and academic. She was the first woman to be Master of Gonville and Caius College, Cambridge. She is Professor of Private International Law at the University of Cambridge, where her research covers the conflict of laws and company law. In 2024 Rogerson announced her intention to retire as master and return to teaching and research.

== Life ==
Philippa Jane Rogerson is a British solicitor and academic who was Master of Gonville and Caius College, Cambridge from October 2018 to September 2025. She is Professor of Private International Law at the University of Cambridge, where her research covers the conflict of laws and company law. In 2017, she was a member of the university's council.

Rogerson studied economics and law at Newnham College, Cambridge, receiving a BA in 1983, and went on to be admitted as a solicitor in 1986, working for Clifford Chance. She became a fellow of Caius in 1989 and was awarded a PhD in 1990 for a thesis titled Intangible property in the conflict of laws.

In May 2017, the college announced that Rogerson had been elected the next master of Gonville and Caius, succeeding chemist Sir Alan Fersht when he retired in September 2018. She is the college's forty-third master, and first female master, and was installed as such on 1 October 2018. Rogerson announced her intention to retire as master after seven years in the role, intending to return to teaching and research in private international law.

She was a governor of Oundle School for ten years. She has five children.

== Selected works ==
- Rogerson, Pippa (2013). Collier's Conflict of Laws (4th ed.). Cambridge: Cambridge University Press. ISBN 978-0521735056.

Academic offices
Preceded by Sir Alan Fersht	Master of Gonville and Caius College, Cambridge; 2018–2025	Succeeded by Richard Gilbertson
