= Andrea Kremer =

American sports journalist

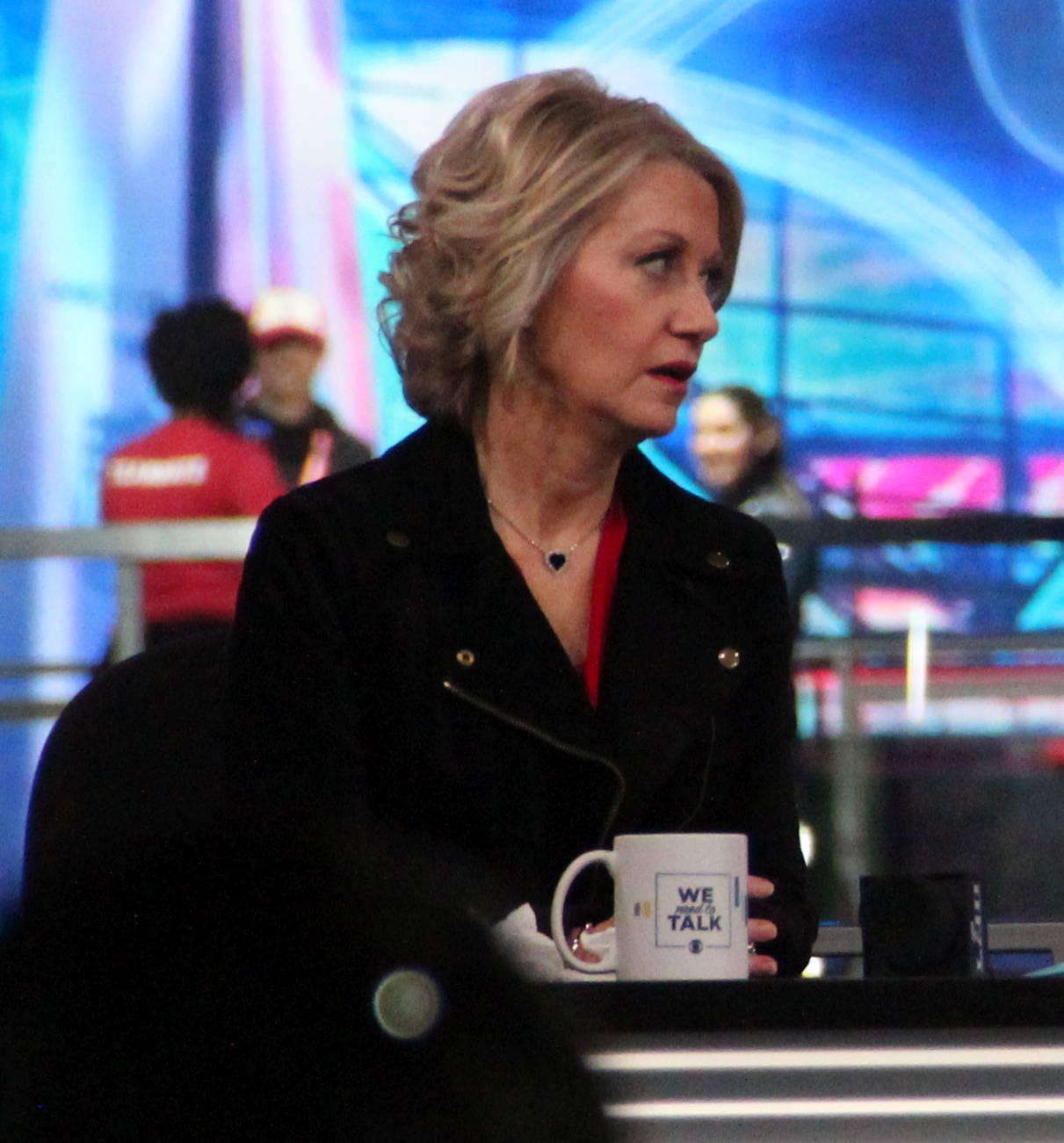
- Kremer in 2019
- Born: Andrea Kremer; February 25, 1959 (age 67); Philadelphia, Pennsylvania, U.S.
- Education: University of Pennsylvania
- Occupation: Sports journalist
- Spouse: John Steinberg
- Children: 1

Andrea Kremer (born February 25, 1959) is a multi-Emmy Award-winning American television sports journalist. She previously called Thursday Night Football games for Amazon Prime Video. Kremer is currently the Chief correspondent for the NFL Network.

In 2018, Kremer received the Pete Rozelle Radio-Television Award from the Pro Football Hall of Fame. She has covered more than 30 Super Bowls, the NBA Finals and All-Star Games, the Major League Baseball All-Star Game and League Championship Series, college football bowl games, NHL Stanley Cup Playoffs and Finals, the NCAA men's basketball tournament, U.S. Olympic basketball trials, 2012 U.S. Olympic swimming trials, and the PGA Championship.

== Early life and career ==
Kremer was born February 25, 1959, in Philadelphia, Pennsylvania. She graduated from Friends Select School in Philadelphia and then became a student at the University of Pennsylvania. While at the University of Pennsylvania, Kremer became a member of the sorority Phi Sigma Sigma and pursued her passion for ballet, performing with the Philadelphia Civic Ballet Company.

Kremer began her career in 1982 as the sports editor of the Main Line Chronicle in Ardmore, Pennsylvania, the state's largest weekly newspaper. Upon completing a story on NFL Films, the television production arm of the National Football League, Kremer's mother urged her to apply for a position.

She left the Chronicle in 1984 to join NFL Films as its first female producer. Her first assignment was working on the HBO program Inside the NFL. Kremer worked until 1989 as a producer, director, and on-air personality for This is the NFL. She produced a "The All-Pro Dream Team," "All the Best", and "Gift of Grab". She received an Emmy Award nomination in 1986 for writing and editing the NFL Films special "Autumn Ritual." While at NFL Films, she served as contributing reporter to the Philadelphia Eagles Pre-Game Show on WIP-AM

== Career ==
=== ESPN ===
In 1989, she became ESPN's first female correspondent. She served as their Chicago-based correspondent, then moved to Los Angeles to work as correspondent in 1994.

At ESPN, she worked on SportsCenter, Sunday NFL Countdown, Monday Night Countdown, and Outside the Lines, in addition to pieces on ESPN.com, ESPN Radio, and ESPNEWS. She moderated roundtable discussion and conducted interviews as a substitute host for Up Close. Many of her stories addressed topics such as domestic violence, sexual assault, and drug abuse.

=== NBC Sports ===
Kremer left ESPN in 2006 to become a sideline reporter for NBC Sunday Night Football and to contribute to the studio program Football Night in America.

She was a reporter on NBC's coverage of the 2010 Winter Olympics in Vancouver and the 2008 Olympics in Beijing. During her time in Beijing, she reported on swimming, diving, and Michael Phelps's pursuit of eight gold medals. During the swimming events of the 2012 Olympics, she reported on the competition between Phelps and Ryan Lochte and on Phelps becoming the most decorated Olympian of all time. In 2010, she concentrated her 2010 Winter Olympics coverage on speed skating in Vancouver.

She served as the sideline reporter for Super Bowl XLIII in February 2009. In 2011, she left Sunday Night Football and was replaced by Michele Tafoya.

Kremer has been a correspondent for HBO's Real Sports with Bryant Gumbel since 2007, having contributed a host of critically acclaimed profiles and features to the Emmy Award-winning newsmagazine show. Her 2016 investigation into sexual assault in Bikram Yoga, which was named as one of the ten most shocking stories of the year by Metro.

During her time at Real Sports with Bryant Gumbel, she interviewed Robert Kraft, Kobe Bryant, Urban Meyer, Pete Carroll, Phil Jackson, Lane Kiffin, Barret Robbins, DeMaurice Smith, Bill Parcells, Joakim Noah, Jim Harbaugh, and John Harbaugh.

Kremer became a regular contributor to NFL Magazine with former NFL quarterback Boomer Esiason. The magazine folded after four issues.

=== NFL Network ===
In 2012, Kremer joined NFL Network as a Chief Correspondent and led the network's coverage and in-depth reporting on health and safety. She reported on defensive back Darrelle Revis return from an ACL injury. She interviewed Johnny Jolly during his prison sentence for drug abuse charges and return to the field with the Green Bay Packers. She also did a story on Laurent Robinson's concussion.

=== We Need to Talk ===
In 2014, Kremer joined the team of We Need to Talk, the first all-female nationally televised weekly sports show. Airing in prime time, the weekly show featured a rotating group of female panelists discussing all topics and news in sports. At the conclusion of the program's inaugural season, the show won a Gracie Grand Award for On Air Talent: Sports Program.

Along with Hannah Storm, she made sports history by becoming the first all-women booth to call an NFL game. They called their first game on September 27, 2018, and called five Thursday Night Football seasons on Amazon Prime Video.

== Awards and honors ==
Kremer was inducted into the National Sports Media Hall of Fame in 2024, as well as the Sports Broadcasting Hall of Fame in the same year. She was named the 2018 recipient of the prestigious Pete Rozelle Radio-Television Award, presented annually by the Pro Football Hall of Fame, recognizing longtime exceptional contributions to radio and television in professional football. She was presented with the award at the 2018 Enshrinement Ceremony on Saturday, August 4 in the Tom Benson Hall of Fame Stadium.

Kremer has received nine Emmy Awards in her career (1996, 2001, 2003 x2, 2005, 2021, 2022 x2, 2023). In 2012, she received a Peabody Award for Real Sports which featured her story on the abuse of the drug Toradol. She was inducted into the Philadelphia Sports Hall of Fame at the end of 2017. In 2014, she was the first inductee into the Cynopsis Sports Hall of Fame for her contributions to the sports industry. She was presented with the PRISM Award in 2005 for her story on NFL defensive player Dexter Manley's substance abuse and addiction. In 2001, she was named one of the "Most Influential" moms in the country by Working Mother magazine. She was cited "Best Female" sportscaster in POV magazine in a September 1997 poll.

Kremer was named "the best TV interviewer in the business of covering the NFL" by the Los Angeles Times. TV Guide named "among TV's best sports correspondents" whose work is "distinguished by her eagerness to calmly ask tough questions and her refusal to pursue the same old story." In addition, she was listed as one of the "10 greatest female sportscasters of all time" by The Matador Sports.

== Personal life ==
Kremer teaches "The Art of the Interview", a course of her own design, in the School of Journalism at Boston University. In 2015, she was appointed Andrew R. Lack Fellow at Boston University. She has lectured at Stanford, Winthrop, DePaul, and Endicott College.

Kremer has spoken at events for Amarantus Bioscience, Citi, Goldman Sachs, First Republic Bank, Fidelity, NFL All-Access, The Boston Group, and the Philadelphia Eagles. She supports the charities the Brain Tumor Society, Best Buddies, Tom Coughlin Jay Fund Foundation, the Marvin Lewis Community Fund, and Right to Play.

Kremer is married to University of Massachusetts Boston archaeologist John Steinberg and they have a son together, William.
