= Somersham =

Somersham may refer to:

== Places ==
- Somersham, Cambridgeshire an English village
  - Somersham railway station
  - Somersham Town F.C.
- Somersham, Suffolk an English village

== People ==
- William Somersham, a 14th century English academic and priest
