= Polton (disambiguation) =

Polton may refer to:

- Polton, a village in Scotland
- Polton (record label), a Polish record label
- Thomas Polton (?-1433), a British bishop
