= William Buckenham =

16th-century priest and academic

William Buckenham was a 16th-century priest and academic.

Buckenham was born in Great Livermere. He was educated at Gonville Hall, graduating B.A. in 1483; MA in 1486; and D.D. in 1507. He was Vice-Chancellor of the University of Cambridge from 1508 to 1509; and Master of Gonville Hall from 1513 to 1536. He held livings at Barnwell; Holy Sepulchre, Cambridge; and St Michael Coslany, Norwich. He died on 18 June 1540.
