= Richard Gilbertson =

British paediatric oncologist

Richard Gilbertson FRS FMedSci FRCP
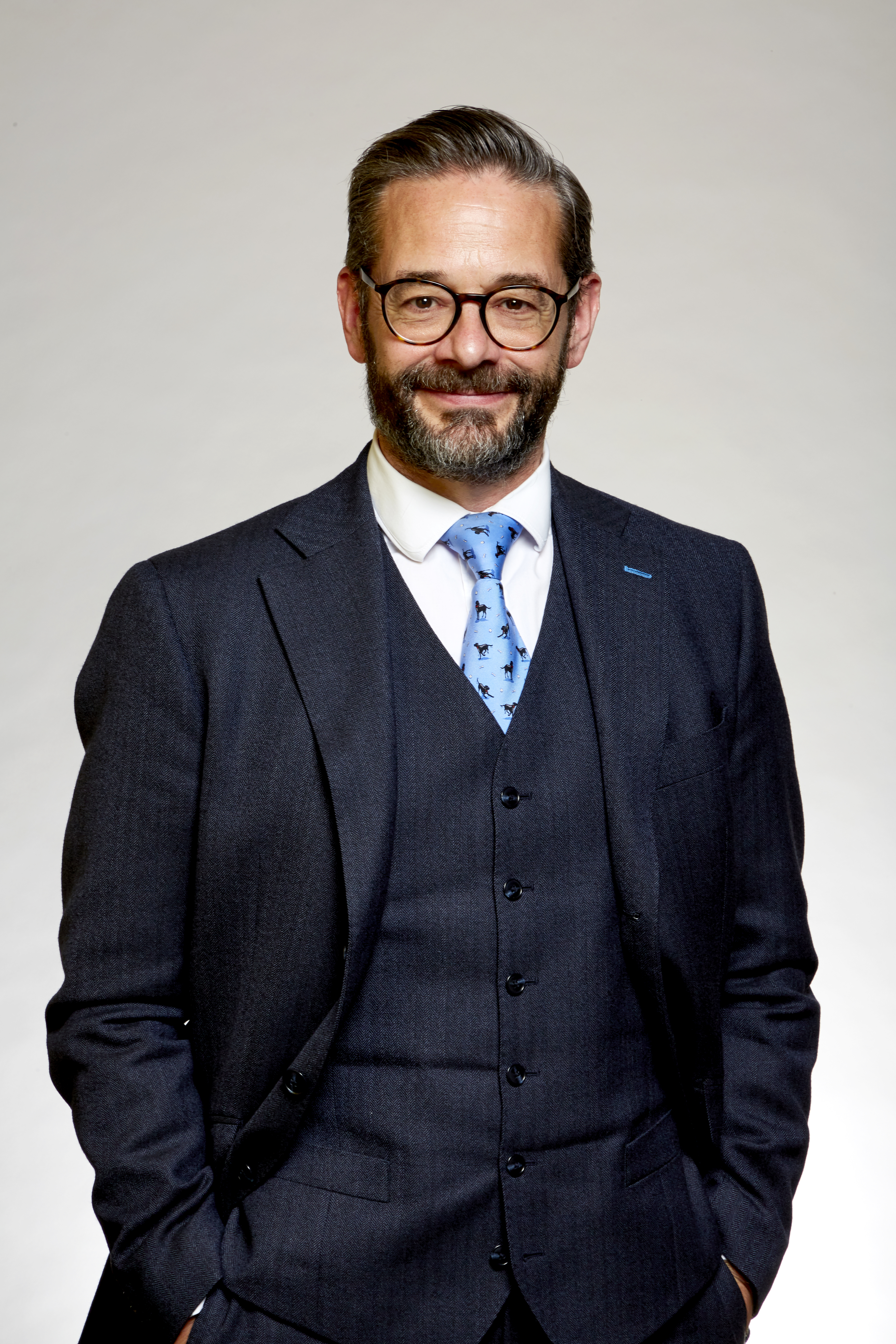
- Born: Richard James Gilbertson
- Education: Newcastle University (BMedSci, MB BS, PhD)
- Awards: Fellow of the Royal Society; Fellow of the Academy of Medical Sciences; Fellow of the Royal College of Physicians
- Scientific career
- Workplaces: Cancer Research UK Cambridge Institute, University of Cambridge; St. Jude Children's Research Hospital; Newcastle University
- Thesis: (1998)
- Website: www.cruk.cam.ac.uk/research-groups/gilbertson-group

Richard James Gilbertson is the 44th Master of Gonville and Caius College, Cambridge and the Li Ka Shing Chair of Oncology at the University of Cambridge. He is also a Senior Group Leader at the Cancer Research UK Cambridge Institute, University of Cambridge.

== Education ==
Gilbertson attended Medical School at Newcastle University, graduating with Bachelor of Medical Science and Bachelor of Medicine, Bachelor of Surgery degrees in 1992. He went on to complete his PhD degree in 1998 as an MRC Clinical Training Fellow with Professors Andrew Pearson and John Lunec before becoming an MRC Clinical Scientist in 1998.

== Career and research ==
Gilbertson's research focuses on understanding the link between normal development and the origins of cancer, with a particular focus on children's brain tumours. He has shown that clinically distinct subtypes of childhood medulloblastoma and ependymoma arise within different lineages of developing brain and are driven by distinct mutations in their DNA. His work has also shown that a combination of stem cell mutagenesis and extrinsic factors that enhance the proliferation of progenitor cell populations across multiple organs ultimately determines organ cancer risk.

In 2000, Gilbertson joined the St Jude Children's Research Hospital in Memphis, Tennessee. There, he became the founding director of the Molecular Clinical Trials Core and the co-leader of the Neurobiology and Brain Tumor Program. In 2011, he was named executive vice president of St. Jude and director of its Comprehensive Cancer Centre. In 2014 he was also appointed Scientific Director of St. Jude Children's Research Hospital.

In 2015, he returned to the UK as the Li Ka Shing Chair of Oncology and was made a fellow of St John's College, Cambridge, serving as head of the Department of Oncology, senior group leader at the Cancer Research UK Cambridge Institute and Director of the CRUK Cambridge Major Centre. In 2025, he was elected the 44th Master of Gonville and Caius College at the University of Cambridge.

He was elected fellow of the Academy of Medical Sciences (FMedSci) in 2017; fellow of the European Academy of Cancer Sciences in 2017; and fellow of the Royal Society of London (FRS) in 2022. His certificate for election to fellow of the Royal Society reads:

Richard has pioneered the field of cross-species genomics, deploying data generated from patients to identify the lineage origins of childhood brain tumours; build accurate models of these cancers; and design new treatments. He has also generated organism-wide maps of cancer risk across all organs and ages, helping to understand the relative contributions of cell lineage, gene mutation and tissue damage to tumourigenesis.

== Awards and honours ==
- International Society of Paediatric Oncology Schweisguth Prize, 1998
- Royal College of Paediatrics and Child Health SPARKS Young Investigator of the Year, 2000
- British Paediatric Neurology Association Ronnie McKeith Prize, 2002
- Brain Tumor Society Sydney Schlobohm Leadership Chair of Research, 2006
- Malia's Cord Foundation Harold C. Schott Research Chair, 2008
- American Association of Neurological Surgeons Hunt-Wilson Lectureship, 2011
- Elected to the American Society for Clinical Investigation, 2013
- Member, Faculty of 1000
- Elected Fellow of the Academy of Medical Sciences, 2017
- Elected Fellow of the European Academy of Cancer Sciences, 2017
- Elected Fellow of the Royal College of Physicians, 2020
- Elected Fellow of the Royal Society, 2022
- Society of Memorial Sloan Kettering Prize, 2022
- Elected Fellow of EMBO, 2022
