= Thomas Spofford =

15th-century Bishop of Hereford

- Bishop of Hereford
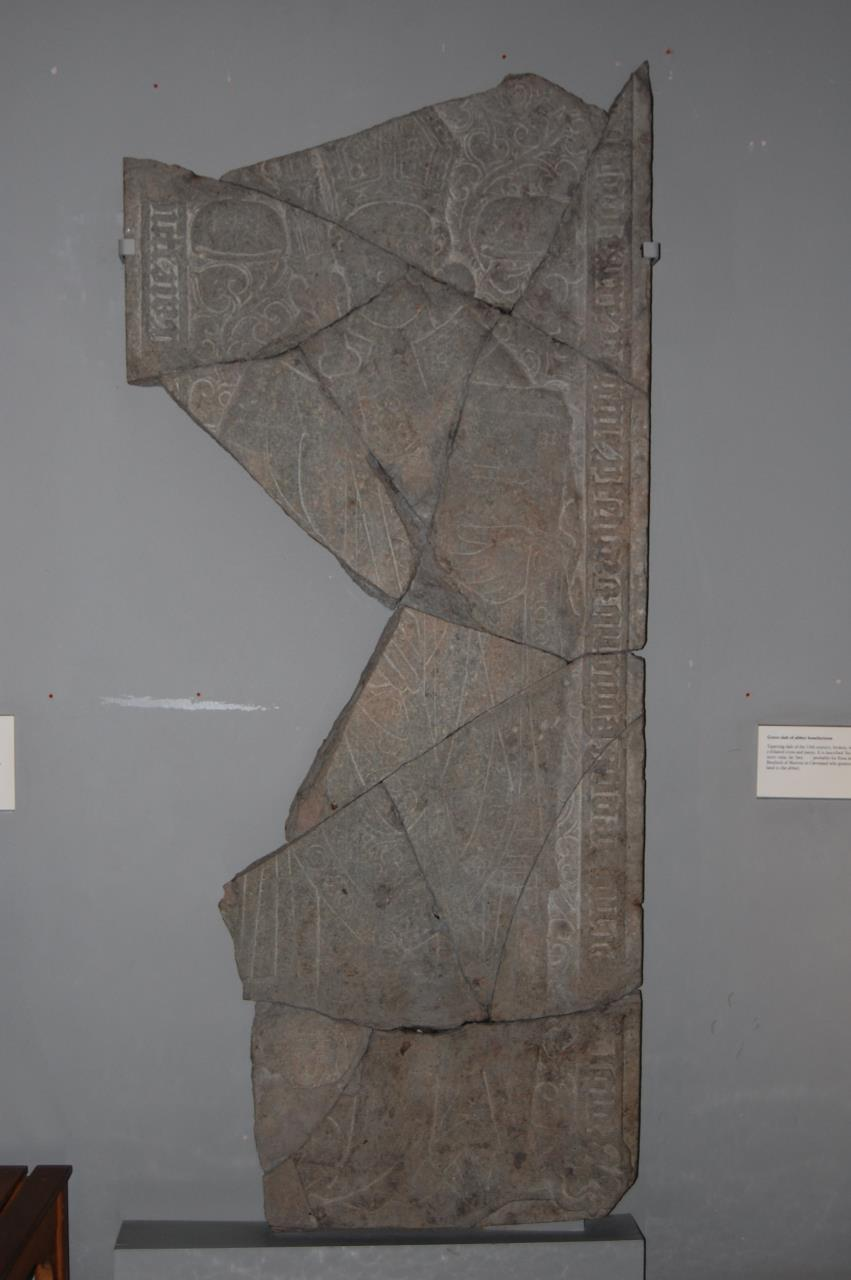
- The tombstone of Thomas Spofford from St. Mary's Abbey, York.
- Appointed: 18 November 1421
- Term ended: resigned about 4 December 1448
- Predecessor: Thomas Polton
- Successor: Richard Beauchamp

Orders
- Consecration: 24 May 1422

Personal details
- Born: 1370s
- Died: 1456 York, Yorkshire
- Denomination: Catholic

Thomas Spofford (d. 1456) was a medieval Bishop of Hereford and Abbot of St Mary's Abbey, York.

== Early life ==
Spofford was probably born in Spofforth, West Riding of Yorkshire, in the 1370s. He entered the Benedictine order at the abbey of St Mary's in York in 1392 and was elected as its abbot on 8 June 1405. He became visitor of the Benedictines in York province, and proctor of the province and the archbishop at the Council of Pisa in 1409. He was one of Henry V's ambassadors to the Council of Constance in 1414. In November 1417 he was one of the six English members of the conclave that elected Pope Martin V.

He was nominated by the Pope to the position of Bishop of Hereford on 18 November 1421 and consecrated on 24 May 1422. He went on pilgrimage to Rome in 1429 but mainly remained in Hereford. He twice petitioned King Henry VI and two popes to be allowed to resign his position. He resigned his see about 4 December 1448.

Catholic Church titles
Preceded by Thomas Polton	Bishop of Hereford; 1421–1448	Succeeded by Richard Beauchamp
