= John Mollon =

British scientist

- Born: John Dixon Mollon; 12 September 1944 (age 81)
- Education: University of Oxford (BA, DPhil, DSc)
- Awards: FRS (1999)
- Scientific career
- Fields: Colour vision; Genetics of Perception
- Workplaces: University of Cambridge
- Website: vision.psychol.cam.ac.uk/jdmollon/

Professor John Dixon Mollon DSc FRS. (born 12 September 1944) is a British scientist. He is a leading researcher in visual neuroscience. His work has been cited over 15,000 times.

== Early life ==
=== Education ===
Having graduated in Psychology and Philosophy from the University of Oxford, Mollon remained at the university for his DPhil. He later received a DSc, also from Oxford.

== Career ==
Mollon was appointed as a lecturer at the University of Cambridge in 1976, a position which he held until 1993. He was then a Reader until 1998, at which point he became Professor of Visual Neuroscience.

He became a Fellow of Gonville and Caius College, Cambridge in 1996; in 2011 he became a Distinguished Teaching Fellow. He has been the President of the Fellows of the College since 2013. The President "is the elected senior representative of the College's Fellows and deputizes for the Master where necessary"

He has previously served as the Chairman of the Colour Group of Great Britain; the Honorary Secretary of the Experimental Psychology Society; and the President of the Cambridge Philosophical Society. He has been the President of the International Colour Vision Society since 2011.

He was the principal developer of the Cambridge Colour Test, and supervised the collection of the Cambridge database of natural spectra.

== Awards and honors ==
- Rank Prize Funds Award for Work on Genetics of Colour Vision 1988
- Edridge-Green Lecture 1988
- Champness Lecture 1998
- Newton Medal 1999
- Kenneth Craik Award 2000
- Tillyer Medal 2000
- Verriest Medal 2005, "bestowed by the Society to honor long-term contributions to the field of color vision"
- Lord Crook Medal 2008
- FRS 1999
