= Will Spens =

Scottish educationalist and academic

Sir William Spens, CBE (31 May 1882 – 1 November 1962) was a Scottish educationalist, academic and Master of Corpus Christi College, Cambridge.

== Life ==
Born in Glasgow on 31 May 1882, one of four sons of John Spens and Sophia Nicol, Spens was educated at Rugby and King's College, Cambridge, graduating in natural sciences. Elected a Fellow of Corpus Christi College, Cambridge in 1907, he spent the rest of his working life in Cambridge, apart from wartime service between 1915 and 1918 with the Foreign Office, for which he was awarded the CBE in 1919, was made a chevalier of the Légion d'honneur by the French and appointed an officer of the Crown of Italy.

Elected Master of Corpus in 1927 he was Vice Chancellor of the University of Cambridge from 1931 to 1933 and then chaired the consultative committee of the Board of Education (known in retrospect as the Spens Report) which recommended the tri-partite split of secondary schooling into grammar, technical and modern varieties.

During the Second World War he was Regional Commissioner for Civil Defence for the Eastern Region, which prompted and exacerbated rumours that the cellars of Corpus extend across (and indeed further than) the entire college campus and that the college was to be used as the centre of operations for East Anglia in the event of a German occupation. Spens wished to maintain the high moral ground in fighting the Nazis. He opposed the use of guerrilla warfare behind enemy lines to oppose any Nazi invasion as being contrary to international convention. He objected first to the plans of SIS in June 1940 and then to the operation of the Auxiliary Units - threatening to have them arrested!

Spens retired in 1952.

== Personal ==
Spens married Dorothy Teresa, daughter of John Richardson Selwyn in 1912; they had four children; a son and three daughters, one of whom died in infancy.

Spens died on 1 November 1962.

== See also ==
Text of the Spens Report

== Notes ==
Attribution:

- This article incorporates text from a publication now in the public domain: "Spens, William (1882–1962)". Dictionary of National Biography. London: Smith, Elder & Co. 1885–1900.

Academic offices
Preceded by Edmund Courtenay Pearce	Master of Corpus Christi College, Cambridge; 1927–1952	Succeeded by George Paget Thomson
Academic offices
Preceded by Allen Beville Ramsay	Vice-Chancellor of the University of Cambridge; 1931–1933	Succeeded by John Forbes Cameron
