= Edmund Stubb =

Edmund Stubb was a priest and academic at the end of the 15th century and the beginning of the 16th.

Stubb was born in Scottow. He was educated at Gonville Hall, graduating MA in 1478; and B.D. in 1501. He was a Fellow of Gonville from 1480 to 1504; and its Master (and Rector of St Michael Coslany, Norwich) from 1504 until his death in 1514.
