= John Smith (astronomer) =

British academic and astronomer

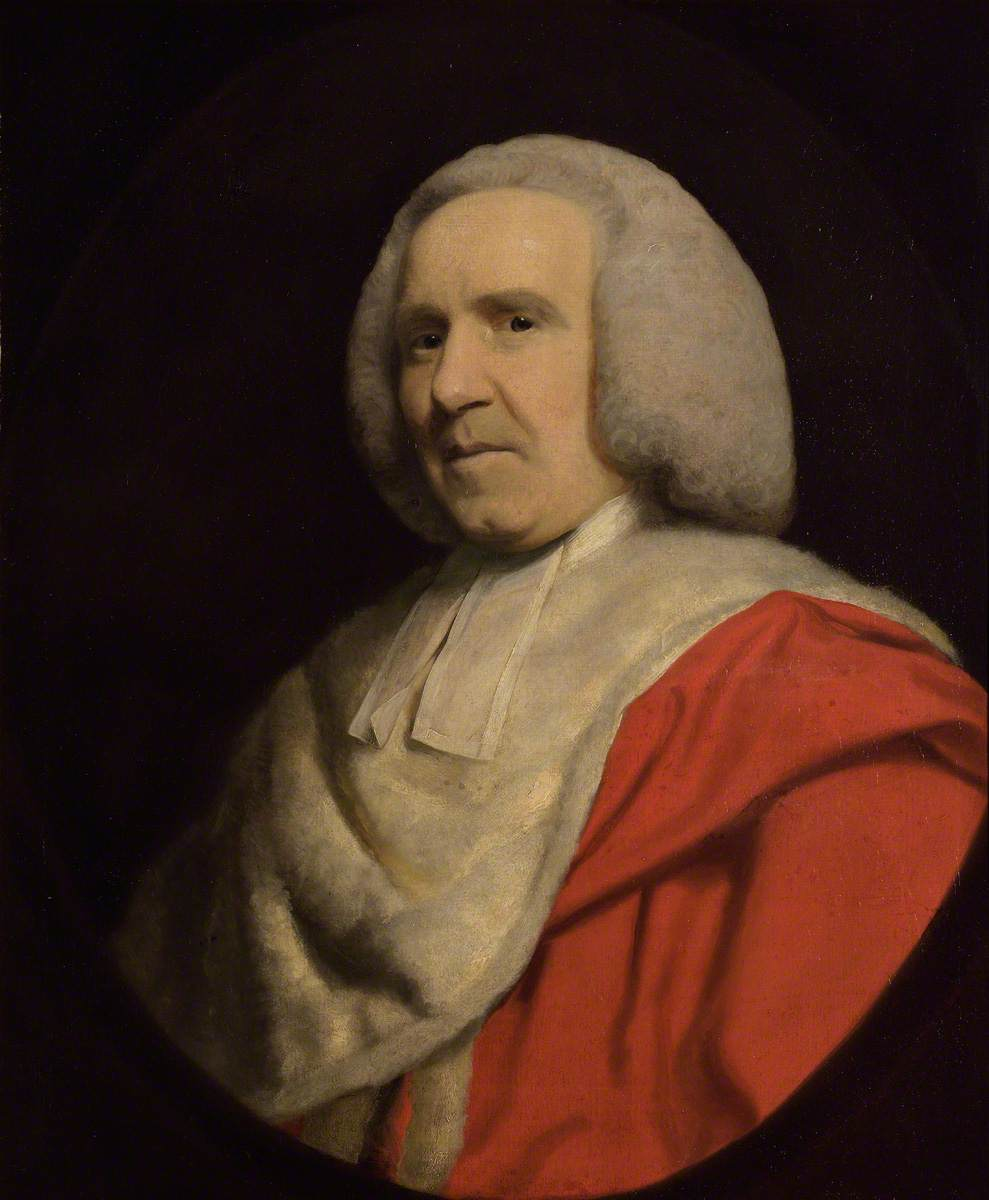
John Smith by Joshua Reynolds

John Smith D.D. (baptised 14 October 1711 – 17 June 1795) was a British academic, astronomer and priest.

== Early life ==
Smith was born in Coltishall, the second son of Henry Smith, an attorney, and Elizabeth Johnson. He spent 3 years at Norwich Grammar School and 6 at Eton College, before being admitted to Gonville and Caius College in 1732.

== Career ==
He was ordained in July 1739, and was briefly the curate of the parish of Coltishall, but became a fellow of Gonville and Caius in September of that year. After holding various offices, he was elected master of his college in 1764, a position he held until his death in 1795. He was the second Lowndean Professor of Astronomy and Geometry from 1771, but seems to have produced little academic work. He did, however, install a transit telescope in the college. He was additionally Chancellor of Lincoln Cathedral from 1783 until his death.

== Personal life ==
He did not marry, but lived with Margaret Smith, the widow of his younger brother Joseph. One of her sons, also named Joseph, became a fellow of Gonville and Caius, while one of her daughters, Mary, married John Porter, an Anglican bishop.

A friend described him as "a very honest and good-tempered man, though always shy and reserved".

== Offices held ==
Academic offices
Preceded by Roger Long	Lowndean Professor of Astronomy; 1771-1795	Succeeded by William Lax
Preceded by Sir James Burrough	Master of Gonville and Caius College, University of Cambridge; 1764-1795	Succeeded by Richard Fisher
