= Thomas Attwood (Master of Gonville Hall) =

15th-century English priest and academic

Thomas Attwood was a 15th-century priest and academic.

Attwood was Master of Gonville Hall from 1426 to 1454. He held livings at Lolworth, Boxworth, Elsworth, Lopham and Mutford. He was also Chaplain to John Mowbray, 3rd Duke of Norfolk.

Academic offices
Preceded by John Rickingale	Master of Gonville Hall; 1426-1454	Succeeded by Thomas Boleyn
