= Thomas Atwood =

Thomas or Tom Atwood may refer to:

- Thomas Warr Attwood (1733–1775), English builder and architect
- Thomas Atwood (judge) (died 1793), chief justice of Dominica and the Bahamas
- Thomas Atwood House, a historic property on Cape Cod, Massachusetts, USA
- Tom Atwood (born 1971), American photographer, New York City

== See also ==
- Thomas Attwood (disambiguation)
- Thomas Atwode (by 1469–1532), Member of Parliament for Canterbury, England
