= St Michael Coslany =

- St Miles Coslany
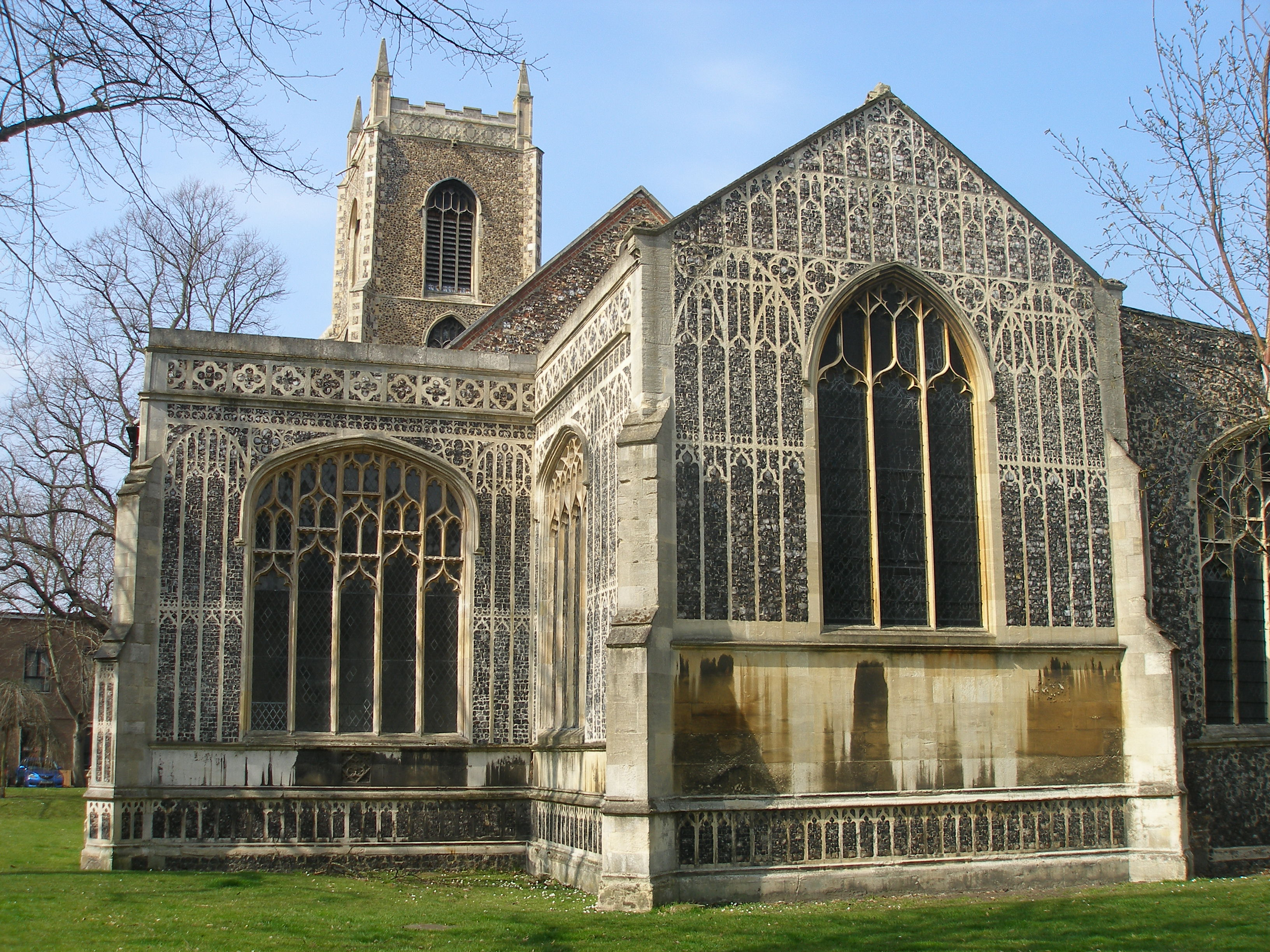
- St Michael Coslany's east windows with perpendicular flushwork in 2015
- St Michael Coslany
- 52°37′58.59″N 1°17′29.08″E
- OS grid reference: TG 22828 08996
- Location: Norwich, Norfolk
- Country: England
- Denomination: Church of England

History
- Dedication: St Michael

Architecture
- Heritage designation: Grade I listed

St Michael Coslany, also known as St Miles, is a Grade I listed redundant parish church in Norwich, England. The building is located on the southern end of Oak Street, and on the northern side of the street Colegate. It is often considered to be the grandest church in north Norwich, particularly for its early 16th- and 19th-century flint flushwork.

== Dedication ==
The church is dedicated to Michael, the archangel; while churches with this dedication tend to be located on hills, St Michael Coslany is in a low-lying area. It may have instead been dedicated in this way due to its proximity to a small island parting the river Wensum that allowed for a river crossing (now Coslany Bridge), possibly drawing association with the parting of the Red Sea as St Michael is sometimes held to have been in charge of the Israelites during their exodus from Egypt. There was also a belief that St Michael prevented flooding, which was a danger in the area in which the church resides.

== History ==
Ayers et al have stated a plausible foundation date for the church in the 10th or 11th centuries, during which time St Michael's cult was flourishing. The first documentary evidence of the church is from c. 1160, in a settlement of a dispute by the Bishop of Norwich between two claimants of the church; priest Wulward of Timworth (possibly the grandfather of William of Norwich) and St Michael vicar Rainald of Acle. It was decided that Wulward would have the church, but Rainald was able to remain vicar given that he could pay 1,000 herrings per year to Wulward. In the early 13th century, Humfrey of Acle was incumbent at the church, and by c. 1300 William Overdam, also of Acle, was its patron. Overham held the church 'in right of Gundelf's half acre in Aclefield'. Appointment was dictated by John and Walter Daniel in 1387, who would go on to be mayors of Norwich, though around 1395 John Ocle (presumably of the Acle family according to Ayers et al) acquired appointment. The Daniel brothers acquired the half acre by 1414.

By 1460 presentation was owned by Master of Gonville Hall in Cambridge, Thomas Boleyn, and after this was transferred to the hall's subsequent masters. In the later Middle Ages, a chapel, altar and image to the cult of William of Norwich was in the church, though this may have existed far beforehand. From 1501, Gonville Hall masters John Barley, Edmund Stubb and William Buckenham took on the role of rector of the church. During this time, a parsonage with a stable and walls was built, and the yard was extended to accommodate capons and a privy. Buckenham ended the streak of Gonville Hall masters being rectors in 1536. Between 1567 and 1579, the St Michael Coslany register recorded 41 burials of incomers, 37 of whom were listed as 'strangers' (immigrants from the Low Countries), three as 'Dutch', and one as 'French'.

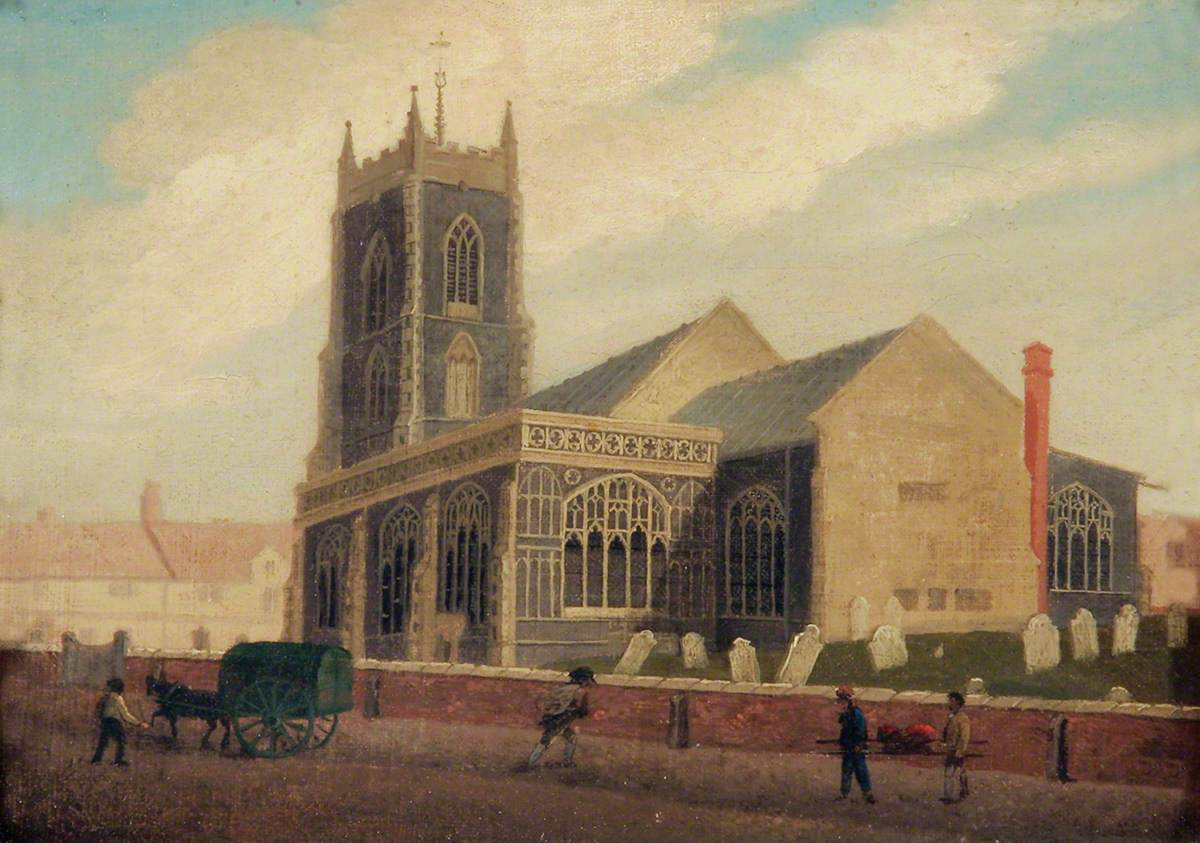
A painting of St Michael Coslany by James Sillett (1764–1840)

A Norman and Beard organ was installed in 1885 but has since been transferred elsewhere. In the early 20th century, both Colegate and Oak Street were widened and the churchyard lost some land as a result; 10 feet to Oak Street and 20 to Colegate. Prior to this, the churchyard was one of the largest in the city. In 1912, T. E. N. Pennell stated that the church had been flooded with four feet of water. The church was designated a Grade I listed building in 1954.

=== Redundancy ===
The church closed in 1971, and after this became a scenery store for the Norwich Puppet Theatre located at St James's church. It then became a gym for martial arts, attached to a nearby local authority facility, which involved the construction of a complex at the nave's west end that had changing rooms, showers, and a viewing gallery. The gym closed in 1995.

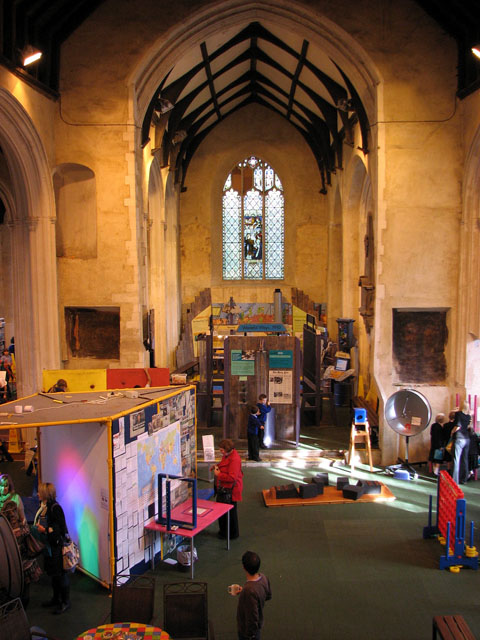
The church housed the Inspire Discovery Centre (pictured 2010) from after 1995 until 2011

After this, the church building became the Inspire Discovery Centre, a children's science museum. In January 2010, the centre had to temporarily close when it was found that a chunk of flint had fallen from the 13th-century bell tower. Though the centre returned to operation at the end of that month, on 24 March 2011 it was announced that the centre would be closing permanently at the church on 28 March to make way for urgent repairs to the bell tower, expected to take up to a year, and that it would be attempting to find more suitable premises. In 2013, major restoration work on the tower was done.

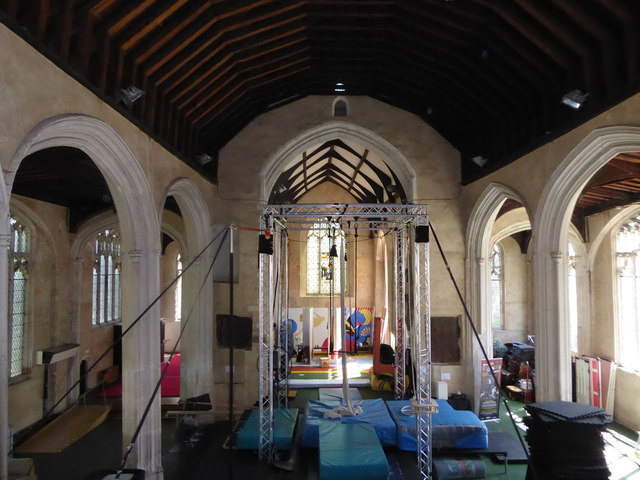
The church as Oak Circus Centre in 2017

From 2016, the church became home to a school for acrobats known as the Oak Circus Centre, opened by Lost in Translation Circus. Part of the chancel ceiling collapsed in 2021, and the church was added to the Heritage at Risk Register; Historic England funded a £172,500 restoration of the church's roof in 2022 through the Culture Recovery Fund which repaired the chancel roof and re-leaded the south nave west window, structurally repairing the latter's stonework. The church is presently in the care of Norwich Historic Churches Trust.

== Architecture ==
The church is of flint and brick with stone dressings and a slate roof. Timbers from the common rafters of the church roof were dated in 2022 via radiocarbon wiggle-matching, and have a felling date range of 1434–66. It has a four-stage west tower dating to about 1425, a nave and chancel, north and south aisles, a south chancel aisle, and a north chapel. Its north aisle and chapel are ashlar-faced. It has arcade pillars of the late Perpendicular style. The chancel roof has five bays and is arch-braced with its wall posts ending on corbels.

The church is noted for its display of flushwork of white stone against black flint. The south aisle retains it from the fifteenth century and was added in 1500, by Alderman Gregory Clark. The chapel at the east end was added by Robert Thorpe as his chantry chapel. The north aisle was built by Alderman William Ramsey in 1502–04. The nave was rebuilt by the Stalon brothers in the early sixteenth century. The south porch was demolished in 1747. A restoration was carried out in 1883 to 1884 when the flushwork on the chancel was rebuilt, and a new east window added.

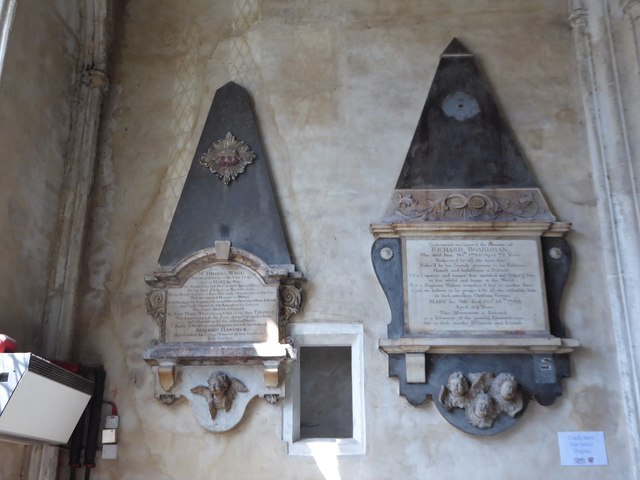
Monuments in the church

== Monuments ==
The church once contained a Dutch memorial to a Stranger immigrant; it recorded that Francis Vanderbeck, 'a Dutchman', was buried at the church on 20 May 1587. There is another Stranger monument; a blue-black marble ledger slab on the wall which commemorates the wealthy merchant Franchoys van der Beke (d. 1592). It may have been imported from Continental Europe as it has armorial roundel, unique for 16th-century ledger slabs in the region.

== Parish ==
The church's parish boundaries were largely defined by water or low-lying marshy ground; the southern and western boundaries largely ran along the river, though included the island in the Wensum as well as a small area on the river Wensum's south bank. This made St Michael's one of only two churches in the city whose parish boundaries crossed to the opposite bank of the river Wensum, the other being St Martin at Palace. The parish boundary neared the Muspole cockey on its east side, and on its north side – largely defined by individual property boundaries – it met the parish of St Mary Coslany.
