= John Barly =

English priest and academic

John Barly, D.D. was a priest and academic at the end of the 15th century and the beginning of the 16th.

Barly was educated at Gonville Hall, Cambridge graduating B.A. in 1461 and M.A. in 1465. He was a Fellow of Gonville from 1466 to 1483; and held livings at Barningham Wynter, Mattishall and Winterton. He was Master of Gonville (and Rector of St Michael Coslany, Norwich) from 1483 until his death in 1504.
