= Henry Costessey =

Henry Costessey B.D.
- Died: 20 July 1483
- Occupations: Priest, Academic

Henry Costessey, B.D. was a priest and academic in the 15th century.

Costessey was ordained priest on 15 April 1441. From 1442 to 1472 he was a member of King's Hall, Cambridge. Costessey held livings at Banham, Bixton and Wilby. He was Master of Rushworth College from 1472 to 1475; and then of Gonville Hall from 1475 until his death on 20 July 1483.
