= Great Livermere =

Village in Suffolk, England

Coordinates: 52.306°N 0.767°E

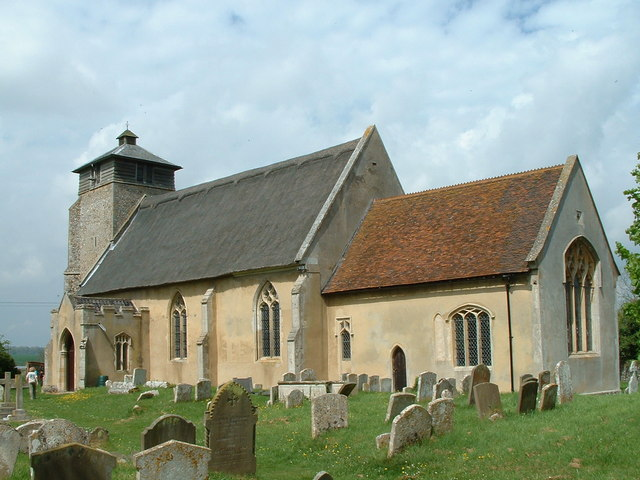
- Church of St Peter

- Location within Suffolk
- Area: 6.51 km^{2} (2.51 sq mi)
- Population: 226 (2011)
  - Density: 35/km^{2} (91/sq mi)
- District: West Suffolk
- Shire county: Suffolk
- Region: East
- Country: England
- Sovereign state: United Kingdom
- Post town: Bury St Edmunds
- Postcode district: IP31
- Police: Suffolk
- Fire: Suffolk
- Ambulance: East of England
- UK Parliament: Bury St Edmunds and Stowmarket

Great Livermere is a village and civil parish in the West Suffolk district of Suffolk in eastern England. It is four miles north-east of the borough's largest town, Bury St Edmunds.

Great Livermere also has a village hall located six miles from Bury St Edmunds, where meetings and other functions are often held for the village. Great Livermere has a small population of 226, according to the 2011 census; 103 males and 123 females are recorded. As seen from the population graph, the village's population has fluctuated rapidly; from 1850 to 1950, the population decreased rapidly, but since the 1950s, the population has steadily risen.

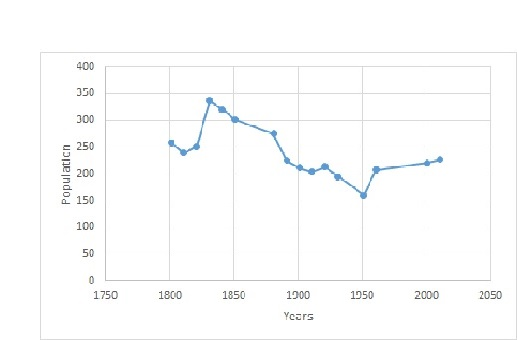
Total population of Great Livermere Civil parish, Suffolk, as reported from the Census of Population from 1801–2011.

== History ==
The village’s name means Reed Lake, derived from the Old English words lēfer meaning rush, or reed and mere meaning pond, pool, or lake. The village is first recorded before the Norman Conquest in the S1051 charter of Edward the Confessor, granting lands to Ely Abbey. The Domesday Book records the population of Great Livermere in 1086 to be 52 households, along with 3 cattle, 3 pigs, and 100 sheep.

The grade I listed church of St Peter’s contains wall paintings, a three-decker pulpit, and one of the finest organs in the area, along with the grave of William Sakings, Falconer to Kings Charles I, Charles II, and James II.

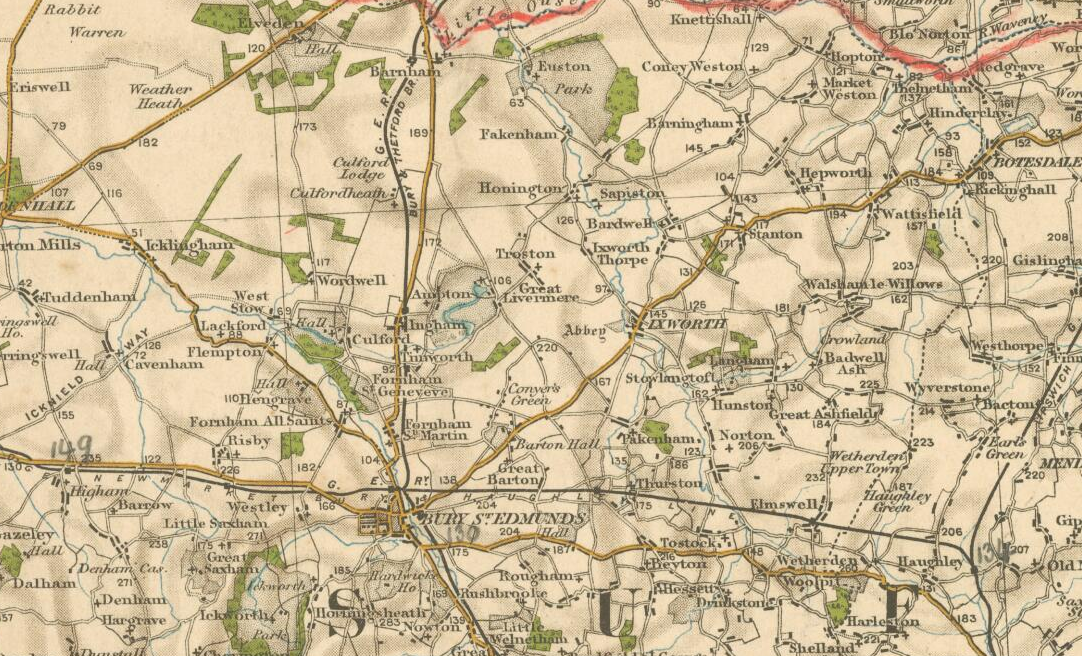
A map image of Great Livermere as reported by Ordnance Survey maps 1904.

== Historical writings ==
In 1870–72, John Marius Wilson's Imperial Gazetteer of England and Wales described the village as:

LIVERMERE MAGNA, a village and a parish in Thingoe district, Suffolk. The village stands 3½ miles W by N of Ixworth, and 5 NNE of Bury St Edmunds railway station and has a post office under Bury St. Edmunds. The parish comprises 1,549 acres. Real property, £1,951. Population, 290. Houses, 64. The manor, with Livermere Hall, belonged to the Duke of Grafton; passed to the Cokes, the Actons, and Admiral Sir G. N. Broke Middleton, Bart; and now belongs to Miss Broke. The Hall is a handsome edifice; it was built by the Duke of Grafton; and stands in a fine park, which extends into Livermere Parva, and is traversed by a fine stream. The living is a rectory, united with the Livermere Parva rectory, in Ely's diocese. Value, £443. Patron, Miss Broke. The church is a small, thatched building with a tower. A town estate for poor widows yields about £39 a year.

In 1887, John Bartholomew also wrote an entry on Great Livermere in the Gazetteer of the British Isles with a much shorter description:

Livermere, Great, parish and village, Suffolk, 5 miles NE. of Bury St Edmunds, 1549 acres, population 275; Post Office, called Livermere.

== In literature ==
The antiquarian and ghost story writer M. R. James was the son of the Rector of Great Livermere. From the age of three (1865) until 1909, James's home, if not always his residence, was at the Rectory in Great Livermere, which inspired the location for A Vignette, his last supernatural story.

Livermere Hall, a country house at Little Livermere which was demolished in 1923, is thought to have inspired the fictitious Castringham Hall in his ghost story "The Ash-tree," published in Ghost Stories of an Antiquary in 1904, and the surname of the ghostly protagonist, "Mothersole," appears on gravestones in the churchyard. The old rectory itself is now known as "Livermere Hall".

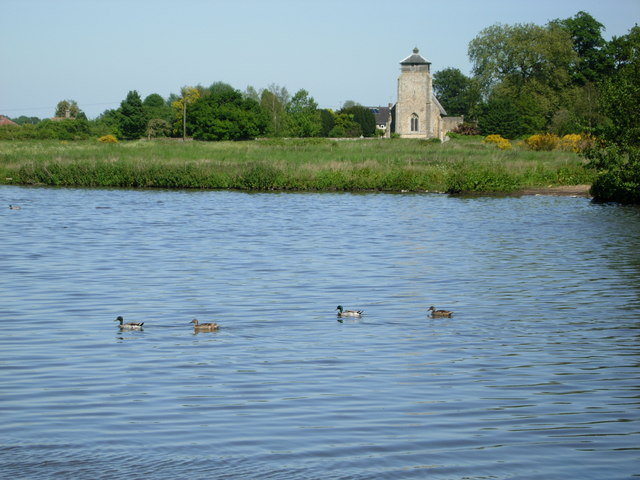
Great Livermere church seen from across Ampton Water.

== Statistics ==
Religion within Great Livermere is predominantly Christian according to the office for National statistics. There are 135 Christians, 70 of whom have no religion, while the remaining population are unaccounted for. According to other figures from Neighborhood statistics, within Great Livermere, marital and civil partnership status demonstrates 49 people are single, 95 are married, 6 are separated, 23 are widowed, and 17 are divorced. Regarding health care within Great Livermere, 45.6% have very good health, 28.3% have good health, 19.9% have fair health, 4.4% bad health, leaving only 1.8% with terrible health. This demonstrates that most of the population has excellent health compared to a small fraction with terrible health, conveying a sense of a good health care sector.

== Occupations of males and females ==
As reported from the Vision of Britain census report in 1881, it is clear from the graph below that there is a significant divide between the occupations of males and females within Great Livermere. The graph demonstrates twice as many females as males within the domestic offices and services industry, compared to a ratio of 39:1 males in the agricultural industry. According to census data from the Vision of Britain report, the agricultural sector is clearly marked on the graph seen below as the most predominant livelihood. In addition, only males engage with animals e.g. game-keeping, whereas females are accounted for as having no engagement.

According to the Vision of Britain census report, the ratio of males to females in the furniture, housing and decorating sector is 5:0, showing no accounts of females. Furthermore, women are the only sex to work with dress, e.g., tailoring, demonstrating the comparison between sexes in terms of occupations at this time. A clear divide is seen in patriarchal norms within Great Livermere and the roles carried out between sexes, as demonstrated by the 1881 graph below. In recent years, as seen from the Office for National statistics census reports from 2011, the majority of industry is manufacturing alongside health and social care activities. This shows a shift from the dominated agricultural sector as reported from the 1881 census reports to a more modern-day industry, such as production and retail trade, although Great Livermere is a small countryside village, farming still occurs as a way of life.

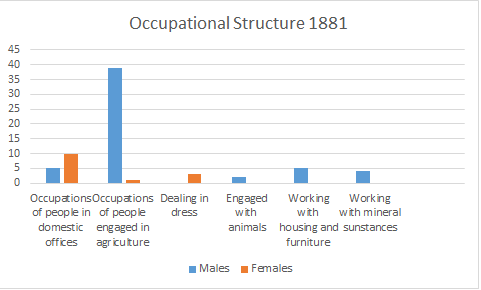
Occupational Structure of males and females in 1881, as reported from the Vision of Britain census report.

== Economy ==
All usual residents aged 16–74 account for 165 of the population of Great Livermere in 2011. Census data for 2011 states

- 62 are in full-time work
- 21 are in part-time work
- 31 are retired, the remaining population cares for the sick and disabled, and some are economically inactive.

In terms of housing within the Village of Great Livermere, it is evident from the Office for National Statistics 2011 census report that bungalows are the most predominant type of housing. Other statistics show 35 live in detached, 61 in semi-detached, 100 in bungalows, and the remaining in either apartments or mobile homes. This shows that most of Great Livermere village is small bungalow housing, perhaps catering to a more elderly population.

== Transport ==
In terms of transport within Great Livermere, Suffolk, it is evident from the Office for National statistics that cars and vans are the most common mode of transport. Census data from 2011 shows 82 people accounting for car and van use for travelling to work, compared to only 4 using a coach or bus. This demonstrates poor public transport in the countryside area of Great Livermere as the majority work from home rather than commute outside of the town, leaving the remaining on foot and by bicycles.

== Notable residents ==
- M. R. James; English author known for ghost stories, medievalist scholar and provost of King's College, Cambridge (1905–18), and of Eton College (1918–36).
- Thomas Clerke (MP); a Member (MP) of the Parliament of England for Wells in 1547.
- William Buckenham; a 16th-century priest and academic.
