= Little Livermere =

Village in Suffolk, England

Coordinates: 52.311°N 0.737°E

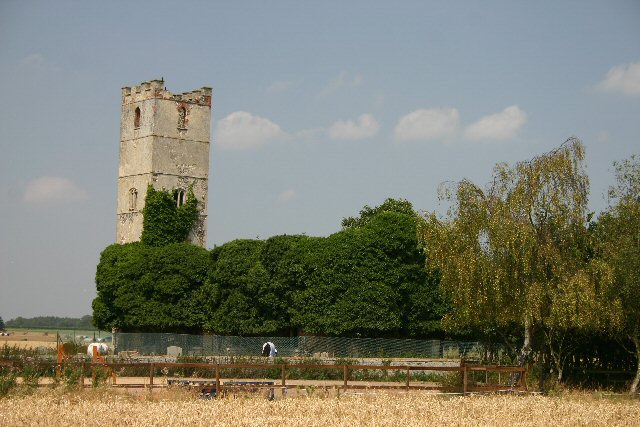
- The church of St Peter and St Paul

- Location within Suffolk
- Population: 40 (2001)
- District: West Suffolk
- Shire county: Suffolk
- Region: East
- Country: England
- Sovereign state: United Kingdom
- Post town: Bury St Edmunds
- Postcode district: IP31
- Dialling code: 01284
- UK Parliament: Bury St Edmunds and Stowmarket

Little Livermere is a village and civil parish in England situated about 5 miles (8 km) north of Bury St Edmunds, in an area of Suffolk known as the Breckland. The population at the 2011 Census is included in the civil parish of Ampton.

In 1688 the Rector, James Paston, published a 39 page pamphlet supporting the repeal of the penal laws.

The village was almost entirely demolished in the 18th century when a park and mere were created in the grounds of the stately home, Livermere Hall, which was itself destroyed in 1923. Livermere Hall is thought to be the setting M.R. James had in mind for Castringham Hall in his ghost story "The Ash-tree", published in Ghost Stories of an Antiquary in 1904. James was the son of the Rector of nearby Great Livermere.

All that remains of the village is the much decayed Church of St Peter and St Paul, which is roofless and considered unsafe, and a farmhouse that stands adjacent to the church on the edge of Ampton Water.

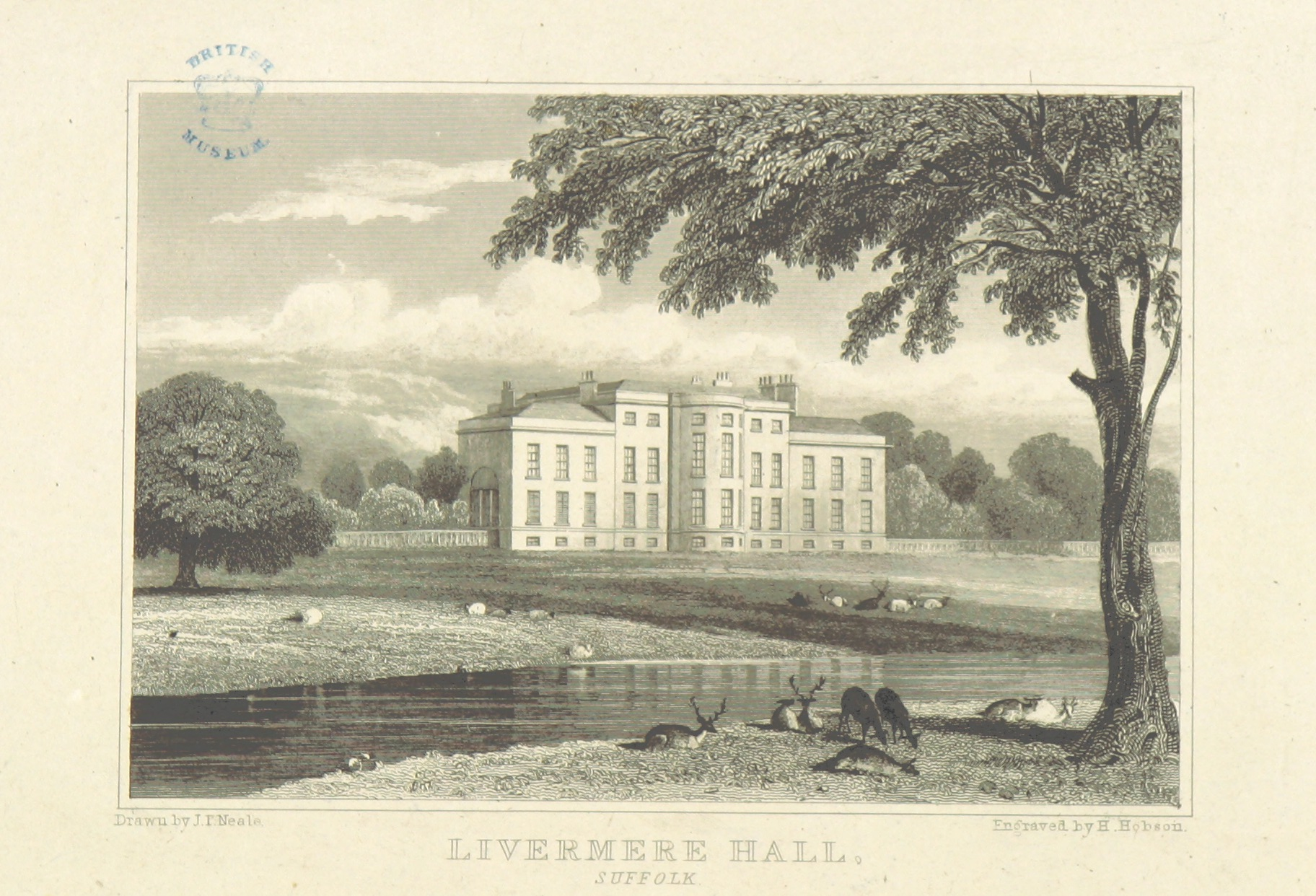
Neale(1818) p4.118 - Livermere Hall, Suffolk
