= Hugh Kerr Anderson =

British physiologist (1865–1928)

Sir Hugh Kerr Anderson FRS
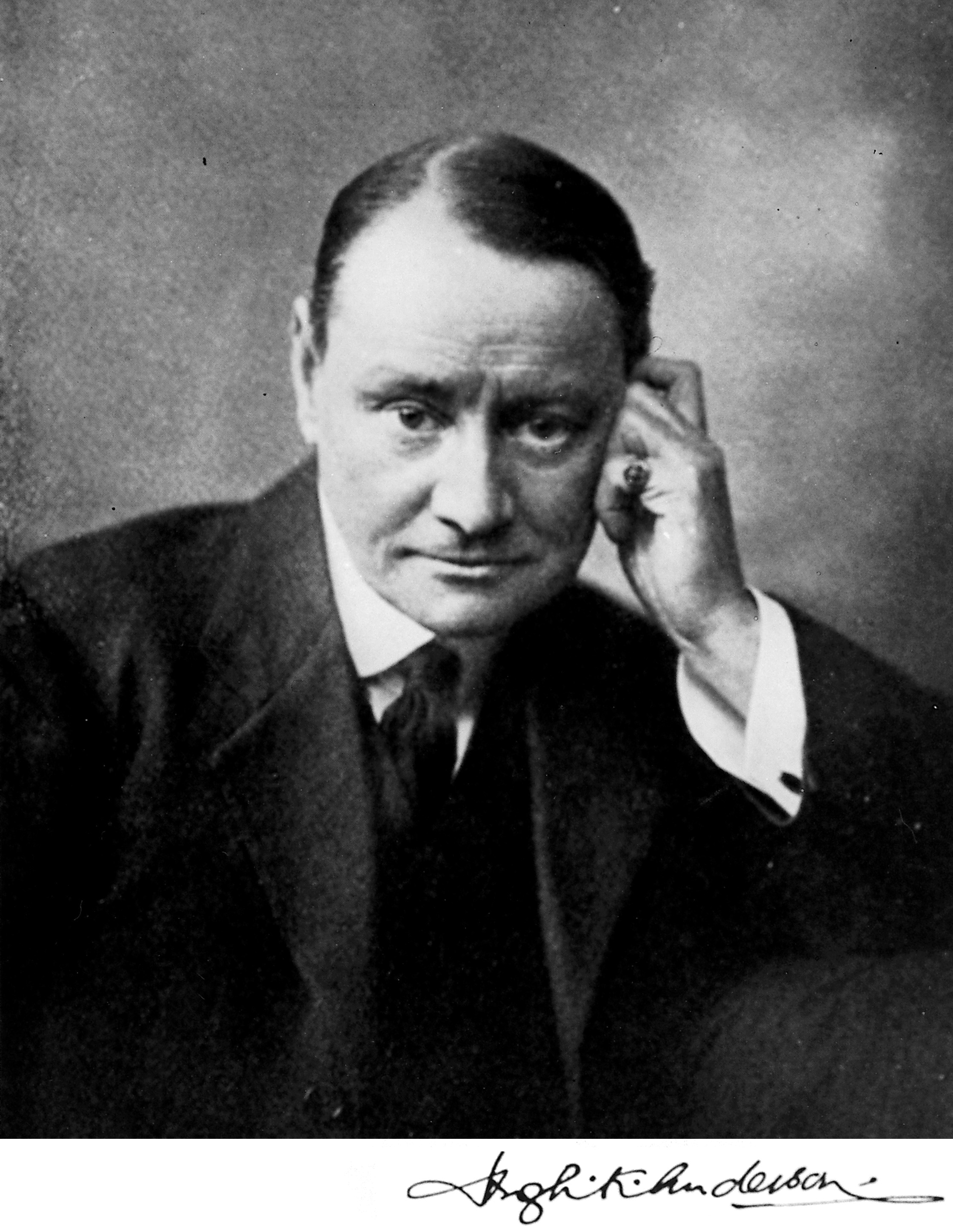

Master of Gonville and Caius College
- In office 1912–1928
- Preceded by: Ernest Stewart Roberts
- Succeeded by: John Forbes Cameron

Personal details
- Born: 6 July 1865 Hampstead, London, England
- Died: 2 November 1928 (aged 63)
- Education: Harrow School
- Alma mater: Gonville and Caius College, Cambridge

Sir Hugh Kerr Anderson FRS (6 July 1865 – 2 November 1928) was a British physiologist, and educator. He was the son of James Anderson (1811–1897) and Eliza Murray, died 1890 aged 60.

Educated at Harrow School, Anderson matriculated at Gonville and Caius College, Cambridge at Michaelmas 1884, and graduated B.A. in 1887 (Natural Sciences Tripos; Scholar 1886–89; Part I, first Class, 1887; Part II, first Class, 1888); M.A. 1891; M.B. & B.Chir. 1891; M.D. 1898, completing his medical training at St Bartholomew's Hospital, London.

Anderson served as a Fellow of Caius 1897–1912, and as Master of Caius 1912–1928. He was the Chairman of the Cambridge University Press in 1918. He was elected Fellow of the Royal Society, in 1907. A monument to him is in the Gonville and Caius College Chapel.

He is buried at Parish of the Ascension Burial Ground, Cambridge. His papers are held at Janus Library, Cambridge.

== Family ==
He married, in 1894, Jessie Mina Innes (d. 1946), daughter of Surgeon-General Francis William Innes CB. The couple had two children: Austin Innes (born 1897) and Mary Desiree (1902–1973), an author. Jessie, Lady Anderson, is buried with her husband, in the same grave in Cambridge.

Academic offices
Preceded by Ernest Stewart Roberts	Master of Gonville and Caius College; 1912–1928	Succeeded by John Forbes Cameron
