= Richard Fisher Belward =

English scholar (1746–1803)

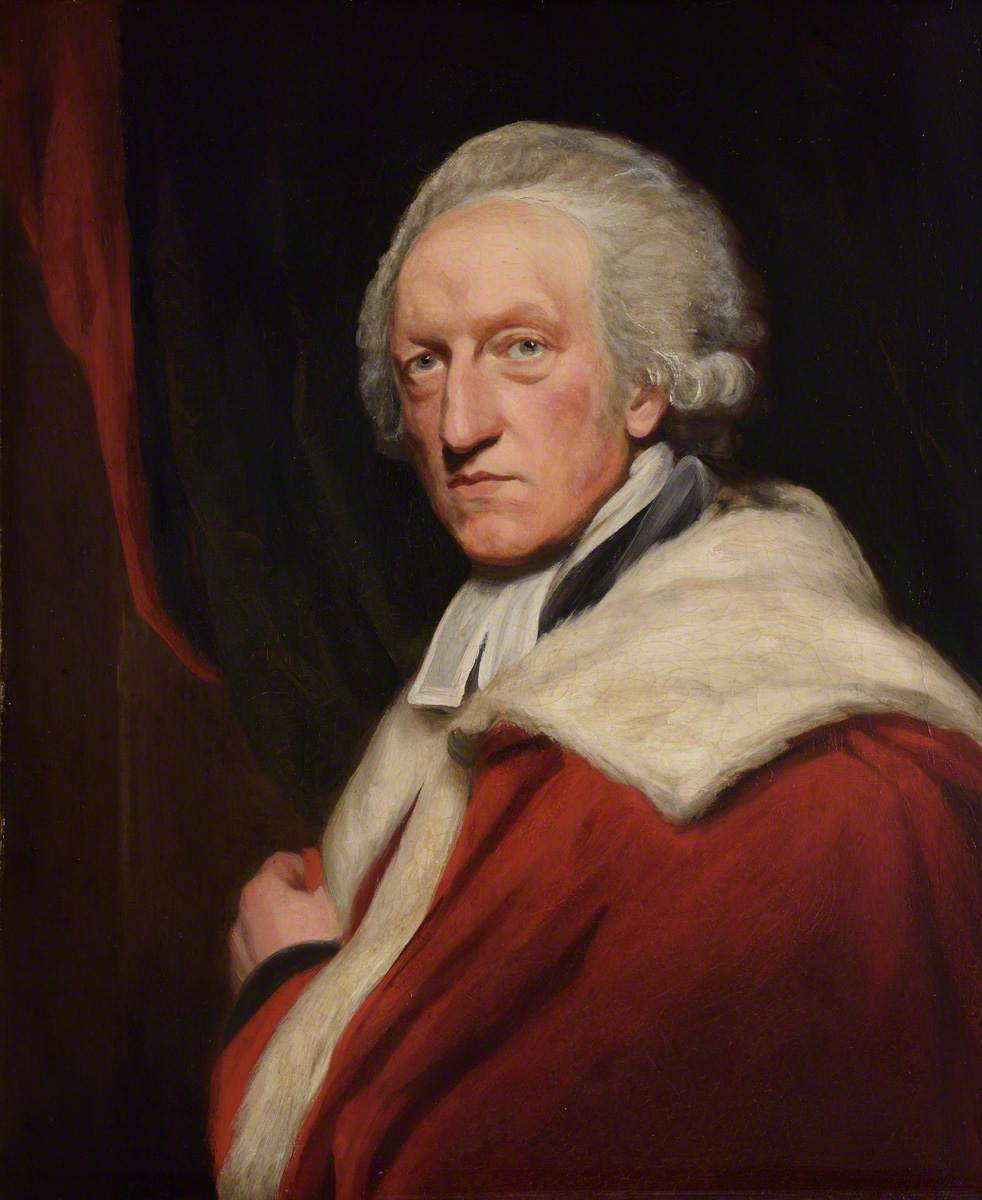
Richard Fisher Belward by John Opie

Richard Fisher Belward FRS (5 September 1746 – 16 May 1803) was an English priest and academic. He was born Richard Fisher, adopting the name Belward in 1791.

Fisher was born in Long Stratton, Suffolk, the son of Richard Fisher, a surgeon. His schoolmaster at both Botesdale School and Thetford Grammar School was John Cole Gallaway. He was admitted to Gonville and Caius College, Cambridge in January 1765, aged 18, graduating BA (9th wrangler) 1769, MA 1772, DD 1796. He was ordained deacon in 1769 and priest in 1772.

He gained a fellowship at Caius in 1769, served as President of Fellows 1790–1795, Master of the college 1795–1803, and Vice-Chancellor of the University in 1796.

He was elected a Fellow of the Royal Society in 1790.

He died on 16 May 1803 in Roydon, and was buried in Diss on 24 May 1803.
