= William Rougham =

- Died: 1393
- Education: Gonville Hall

William Rougham (died 1393) was a Fellow of Gonville Hall, Cambridge (later Gonville and Caius College) from the 1350s. He was Bachelor of Medicine by 1366. He was also a priest with livings in the Diocese of Norwich and was a personal physician to Henry le Despenser, Bishop of Norwich.

In Susanna Gregory's 2004 book The Hand of Justice, which is set in 1350s Cambridge, there is a physician character known as "William Rougham of Gonville Hall".

Rougham's biggest contribution to the college was the completion of the chapel in 1353 which stood as he had left it for 250 years. The east window and one of the side windows contained, according to John Caius, an inscription reading:

Oct 2025 update: A History of Gonville and Caius College (Christopher Brooke, 1985; ISBN 978-0-85115-423-7) does not include William Rougham as Master. It is thought more likely Richard Pulham served as Master from an earlier point. Subsequent dates have been changed in this list.

Orate pro anima Willm' de Rougham qui fecit istam capellam fieri.

— Chapel Window, Gonville and Caius College, Cambridge
