= Norman Macleod Ferrers =

British mathematician (1829–1903)

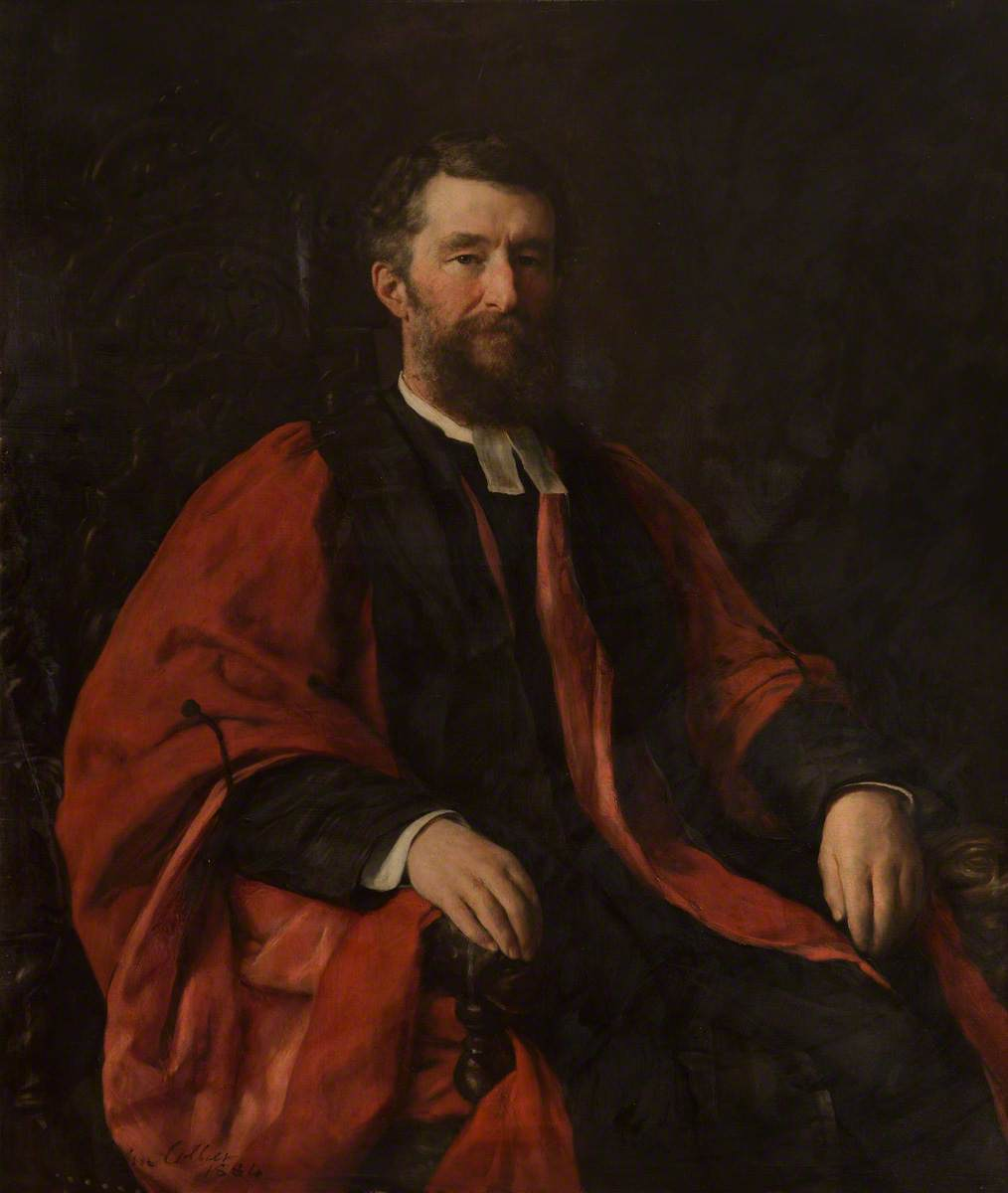
- Norman Macleod Ferrers by John Collier
- Born: 11 August 1829; Prinknash Park, Upton St Leonards, Gloucestershire, England
- Died: 31 January 1903 (aged 73); Cambridge, England
- Education: Eton College; Gonville and Caius College, Cambridge
- Known for: Ferrers diagram Nonholonomic constraints
- Spouse: Emily Lamb (m. 1866)
- Children: 4 sons and 1 daughter

Norman Macleod Ferrers (11 August 1829 – 31 January 1903) was a British mathematician and university administrator and editor of a mathematical journal.

== Career and research ==
Ferrers was educated at Eton College before studying at Gonville and Caius College, Cambridge, where he was Senior Wrangler in 1851. He was appointed to a Fellowship at the college in 1852, was called to the bar in 1855 and was ordained deacon in 1859 and priest in 1860. In 1880, he was appointed Master of the college, and served as vice-chancellor of Cambridge University from 1884 to 1885.

Ferrers made many contributions to mathematical literature. From 1855 to 1891, he worked with J. J. Sylvester as editors, with others, in publishing The Quarterly Journal of Pure and Applied Mathematics. Ferrers assembled the papers of George Green for publication in 1871.

In 1861 he published "An Elementary Treatise on Trilinear Co-ordinates". One of his early contributions was on Sylvester's development of Poinsot's representation of the motion of a rigid body about a fixed point.

In 1871 he first suggested to extend the equations of motion with nonholonomic constraints. Another treatise of his on "Spherical Harmonics", published in 1877, presented many original features. In 1881, he studied Kelvin's investigation of the law of distribution of electricity in equilibrium on an uninfluenced spherical bowl and made the addition of finding the potential at any point of space in zonal harmonics.

He died at the College Lodge on 31 January 1903.

=== Integer partitions ===
Ferrers is associated with a particular way of arranging the partition of a natural number p. If p is the sum of n terms, the largest of which is m, then the Ferrers diagram starts with a row of m dots. The terms are arranged in order, and a row of dots corresponds to each term.

Adams, Ferrers, and Sylvester articulated this theorem of partitions: "The number of modes of partitioning (n) into (m) parts is equal to the number of modes of partitioning (n) into parts, one of which is always (m), and the others (m) or less than (m)." The proof, attributed to Ferrers by Sylvester in 1883, involves flipping a Ferrers diagram about a diagonal line.

In 1951 Jacques Riguet adopted this manner of ordering to the rows of a logical matrix. Alignment of rows of ones along the right side of a matrix is used, instead of the alignment of dots on the left. The logical matrix corresponds to a heterogeneous relation of Ferrers type.

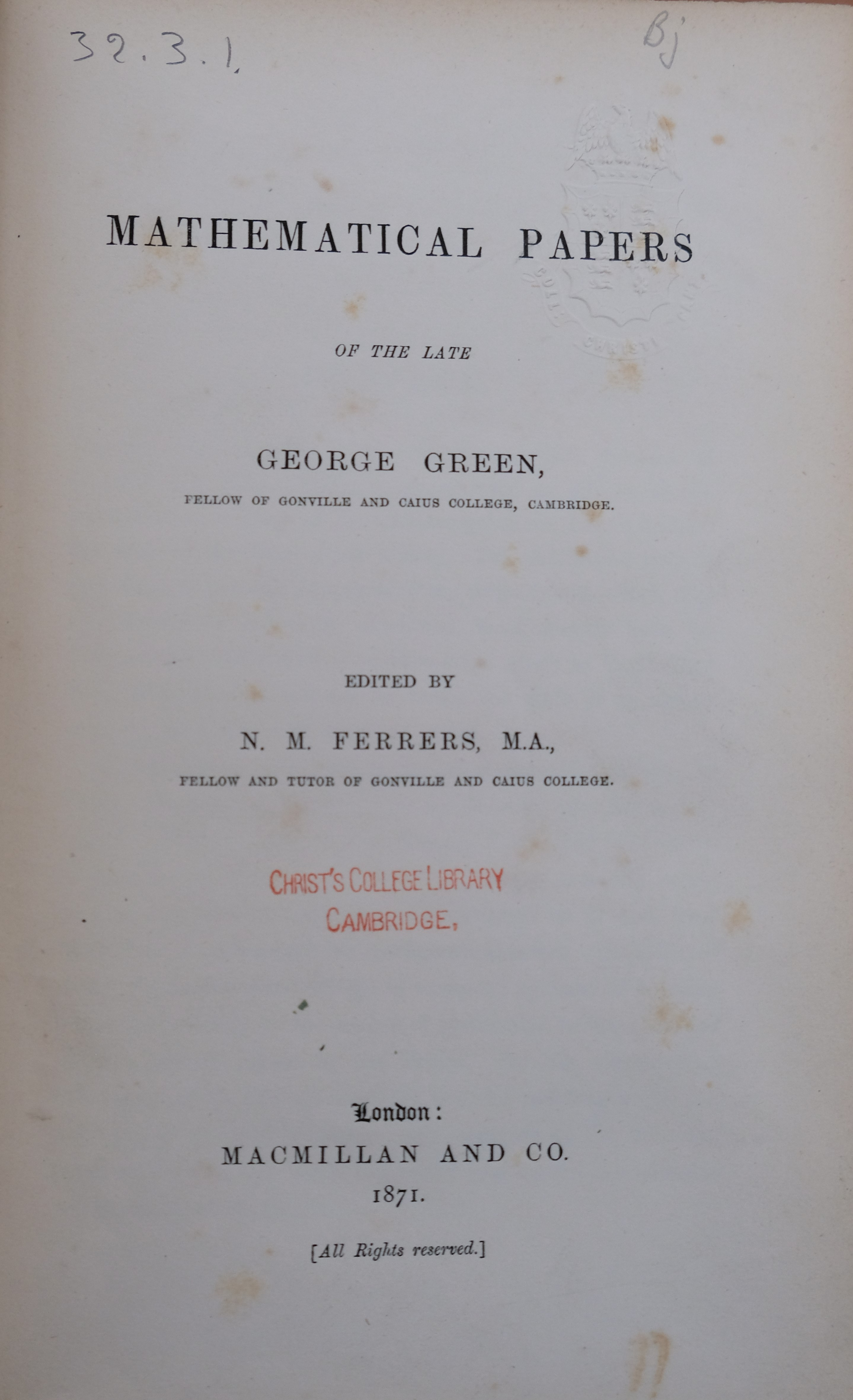
Title page of a 1871 copy of the "Mathematical Papers of the Late George Green," which was edited by Ferrers

== Family ==
On 3 April 1866, he married Emily, daughter of John Lamb, dean of Bristol cathedral. They had four sons and one daughter.

== Bibliography ==
- 1861: An Elementary Treatise on Trilinear Coordinates (London), link from Internet Archive
- 1871: Mathematical papers of the late George Green, Edited By N.M. Ferrers
- 1877: An elementary treatise on spherical harmonics and subjects connected with them (London) from Internet Archive

Academic offices
Preceded by Edwin Guest	Master of Gonville and Caius College; 1880–1903	Succeeded by Ernest Stewart Roberts
Preceded by James Porter	Vice-Chancellor of the University of Cambridge; 1884–1885	Succeeded by Charles Anthony Swainson
