= Bixton =

Bixton may refer to:

- Walter Bixton (died 1403/4), English MP for Norwich
- Rudi Bixton, character played by Omar Benson Miller in American TV series Law & Order: Special Victims Unit
- Sally Bixton, a character in the 1971 American TV film A Howling in the Woods

== See also ==
- Buxton (surname)
