= Richard Pulham =

Richard Pulham, D.D. was a priest and academic in the 14th century.

Pulham became a Fellow of Gonville Hall, Cambridge in 1353; and of Corpus Christi in 1377. He held livings in Lincoln, Belton and Rochester. Pulham was Master of Gonville from 1393 until 1412.
