= Thomas Polton =

15th-century Bishop of Chichester, Bishop of Hereford, and Bishop of Worcester

- Bishop of Worcester
- Appointed: 27 February 1426
- Term ended: 23 August 1433
- Predecessor: Philip Morgan
- Successor: Thomas Bourchier
- Previous posts: Bishop of Hereford; Bishop of Chichester

Orders
- Consecration: 21 July 1420

Personal details
- Died: 23 August 1433
- Denomination: Catholic

Thomas Polton (died 1433) was a medieval Bishop of Hereford, Bishop of Chichester, and Bishop of Worcester.

Polton was nominated to the see of Hereford on 15 July 1420, and consecrated as bishop on 21 July 1420.

Polton was transferred to the see of Chichester on 17 November 1421, but was translated to the see of Worcester on 27 February 1426.

Polton died on 23 August 1433 as bishop of Worcester.

== Citations ==
Catholic Church titles
Preceded by Edmund Lacey	Bishop of Hereford; 1420–1421	Succeeded by Thomas Spofford
Preceded by John Kempe	Bishop of Chichester; 1421–1426	Succeeded by John Rickingale
Preceded by Philip Morgan	Bishop of Worcester; 1426–1433	Succeeded by Thomas Bourchier
