= John Rickingale =

15th-century Bishop of Chichester

John Rickingale D.D.
- Bishop of Chichester
- Appointed: 27 February 1426
- Term ended: about 6 July 1429
- Predecessor: Thomas Polton
- Successor: Thomas Brunce

Personal details
- Died: about 6 July 1429
- Buried: Chichester Cathedral
- Denomination: Catholic

John Rickingale D.D. also known as John de Rickingale (died 1429) was a medieval Bishop of Chichester, Master of Gonville Hall, Cambridge, Chancellor of the University of Cambridge and Chancellor of York Minster.

Rickingale was the last rector of Hemingbrough rectory before Prior John Wessington converted it into a collegiate church. This happened when Rickingale was nominated as bishop of Chichester on 27 February 1426. The nomination was through the interest of John of Lancaster, 1st Duke of Bedford, to whom he was confessor. He was consecrated in Mortlake parish church on 30 or 3 June 1426. He was an early humanist.

== Death ==
Rickingale died about 6 July 1429 and is buried in the north aisle of Chichester Cathedral. He left instructions that a marble effigy of himself should be left as a monument over his tomb. The following verses are engraved on his tomb:

Tu qualis cris ? quid mundi quæris honores.

See what thou soon shall be ! Why dost thou seek
Worldly honours ? Think on thy sins, and weep.
Behold in me, what thou shalt shortly be,

Death at the doors, cries — come along with me.

The executors of Rickingale's will were Peter Schelton, Master & treasurer of the church in Chichester, Edward Hunt, canon of Chichester, John Eppe, parson of Anderby and his nephew John Mannyng.

Academic offices
Preceded by Stephen le Scrope	Chancellor of the University of Cambridge; 1415–1421	Succeeded by Thomas Cobham
Preceded by William Somersham	Master of Gonville Hall; 1416–1426	Succeeded by Thomas Attwood
Catholic Church titles
Unknown	Rector of Hemingbrough unknown–1426	Unknown
Preceded by Thomas Polton	Bishop of Chichester; 1426–1429	Succeeded by Thomas Brunce
