= James Burrough (architect) =

English academic, antiquary and amateur architect

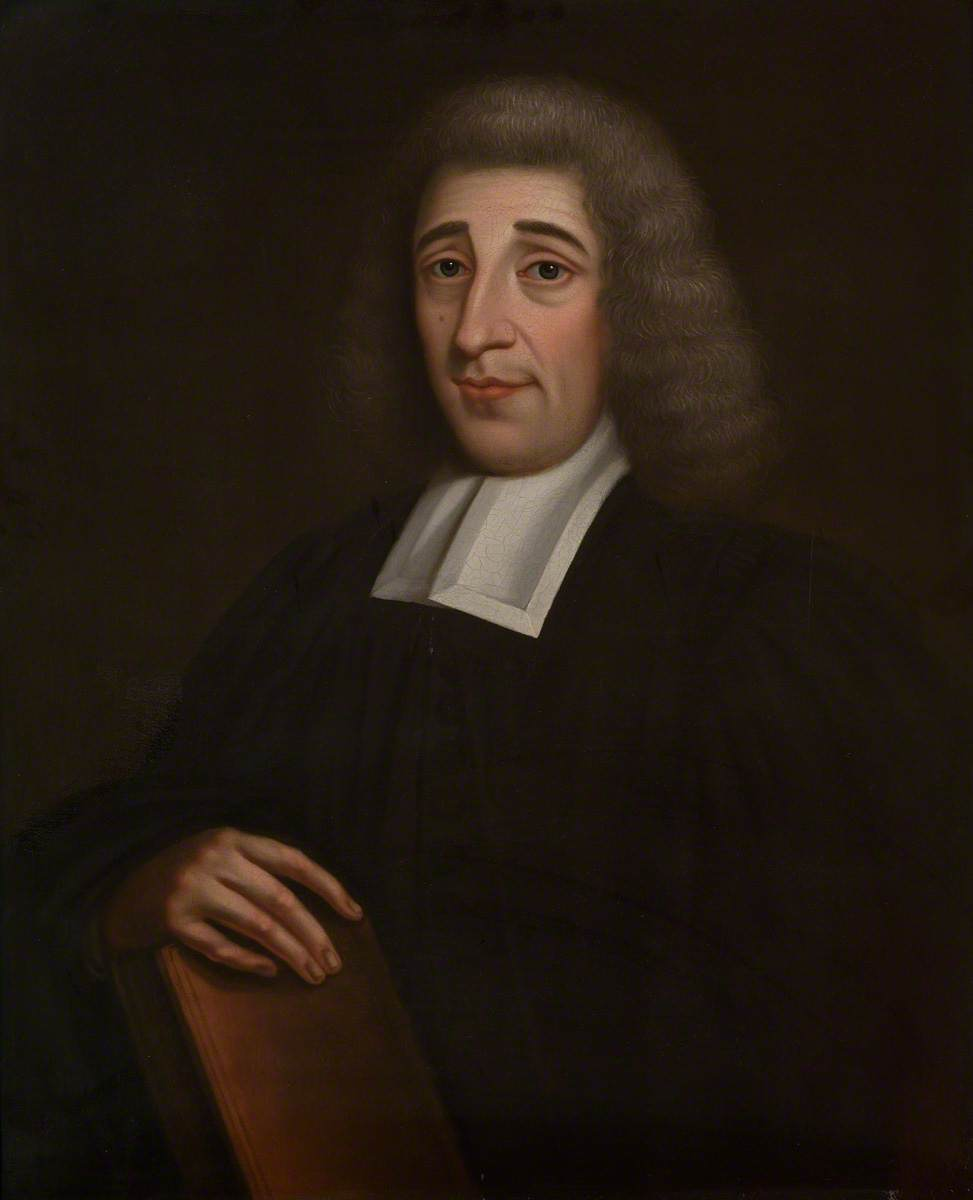
Sir James Burrough by John Theodore Heins

Sir James Burrough (1 September 1691 – 7 August 1764) was an English academic, antiquary, and amateur architect. He was Master of Gonville and Caius College, Cambridge, and designed or refaced several of the buildings at the University of Cambridge in a Classical style.

== Biography ==
The son of James Burrough, M.D., of Bury St. Edmunds, Suffolk, he was born on 1 September 1691. Educated at the grammar school at Bury for eight years, he entered Gonville and Caius College, Cambridge in 1708. He proceeded to the degree of B.A. in 1711, and to that of M.A. in 1716. He was elected one of the esquire bedells in 1727, resigning the post in 1749. He was fellow of his college (on Mrs. Frankland's foundation) in 1738, and Master in 1754, an office which he held until his death on 7 August 1764. He was vice-chancellor in 1759.

He was a Fellow of the Society of Antiquaries, and a collector of pictures, prints, and medals. The Duke of Newcastle, chancellor of the university, procured Burrough a knighthood in November 1759. He died in 1764 and was buried in the antechapel of Caius College.

== Architecture ==
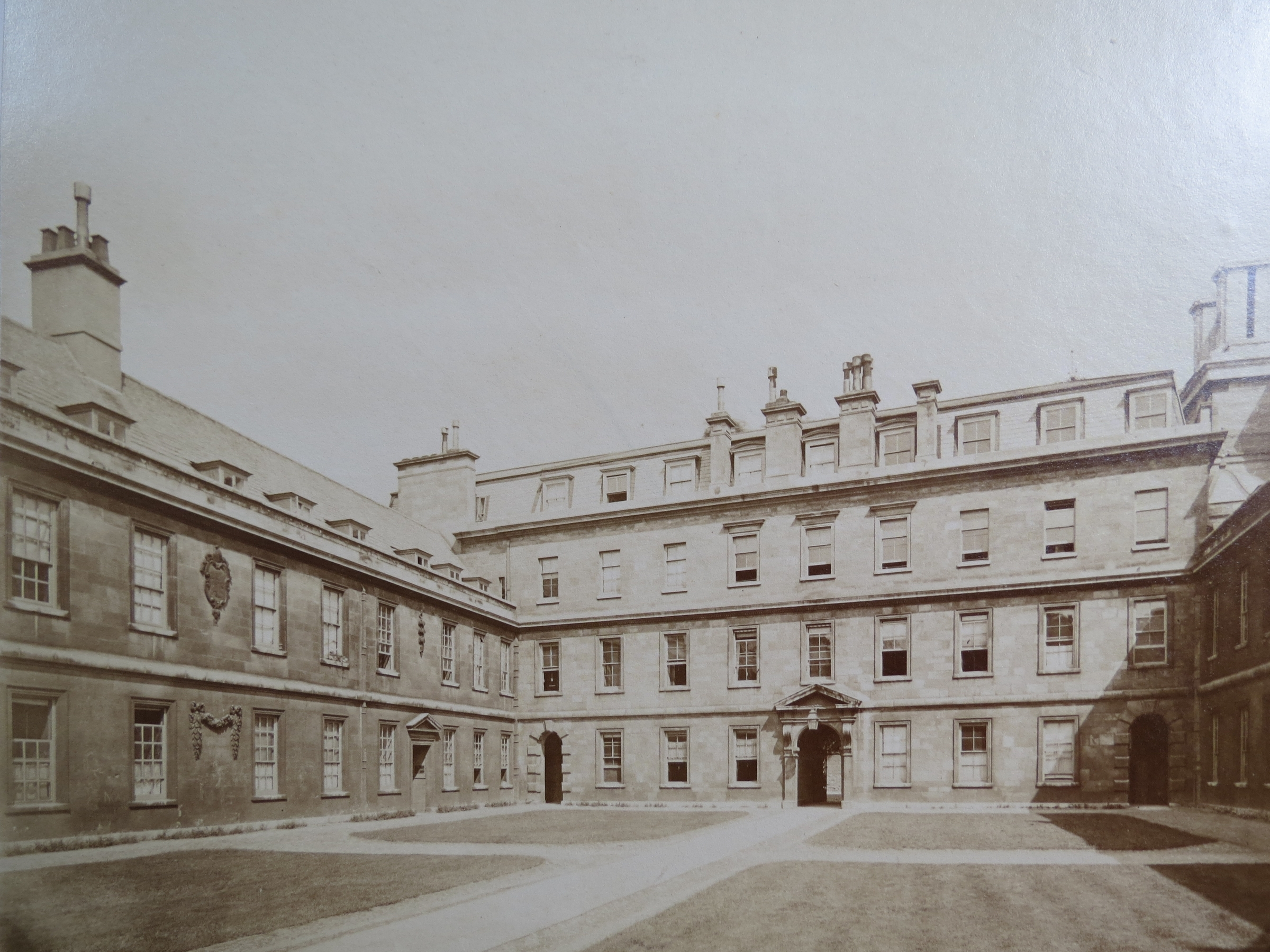
The Front Court at Trinity Hall, Cambridge, refaced by Burrough in 1742–5. Photographed c. 1870.

Burrough had a considerable reputation as an architect at the university, where he used his influence to introduce the Classical style which had then become fashionable. Although basically an amateur, he occasionally took a professional fee, as he did for his work at Peterhouse. In 1721 he was added to a syndicate which had been appointed two years before to build the new Senate House. The following year he submitted a "Plan of the Intended Publick Buildings", which, as the minute-book of the syndic's records, the architect James Gibbs, who had been consulted, was requested to "take with him to London, and make what improvements he shall think necessary upon it". Gibbs was undoubtedly the architect of the existing building, the design being engraved in his published work, and Burrough's share in it was probably confined to general suggestions of style and arrangement.

Burrough was unquestionably responsible for the cupola over the combination room at Caius College (1728); the transformation of the hall of Queens' College into an Italian chamber (1732), for which he received 25 guineas; the "beautification" of Emmanuel College chapel (1735); the new building at Peterhouse (1736), for which he received £50 and a piece of plate; and the facing with stone, in a classical style, of the quadrangle of Trinity Hall (1742–5). This was described by Nikolaus Pevsner as "the first of those ashlaring or re-facing jobs which have done so much to damage the appearance of medieval college courts". He also made plans to replace the library at Trinity Hall, which were not carried out. He built the doctors' gallery in Great St. Mary's Church, refaced Gonville Court at his own college, Caius, in the style he had used at Trinity Hall (1751), and then carried out a similar treatment on the court at Peterhouse (1754). His last work, a new chapel for Clare Hall (1763), was completed after his death by James Essex who had been his pupil. Burrough also designed the dining room at Sidney Sussex College, an 'elegant Rococo room' that emerged from the remodelling was seen as a way to attract students and Fellows at the College.

Besides these works, he was consulted about most of the changes underway in Cambridge and in 1757 he gave advice about a new bridge at Wisbech.

In 1752 he made a design (later engraved) for a new east room and façade for the library adjoining the Senate House. Two years later it was, however, set aside in favour of one by Stephen Wright.

== Sources ==
- Pevsner, Nikolaus (1954). Cambridgeshire. The Buildings of England. Harmondsworth: Penguin Books.
- Summerson, John (1970). Architecture in Britain, 1530 to 1830. Pelican History of Art. Harmondsworth: Penguin Books.

Attribution

This article incorporates text from a publication now in the public domain: This article incorporates text from a publication now in the public domain: Clark, John Willis (1886). "Burrough, James (1691-1764)". In Stephen, Leslie (ed.). Dictionary of National Biography. Vol. 07. London: Smith, Elder & Co.

Academic offices
Preceded by Sir Thomas Gooch	Master of Gonville and Caius College, University of Cambridge; 1754-1764	Succeeded by John Smith
Academic offices
Preceded by	Esquire Bedell; 1727-1749	Succeeded by
