= Thomas Batchcroft =

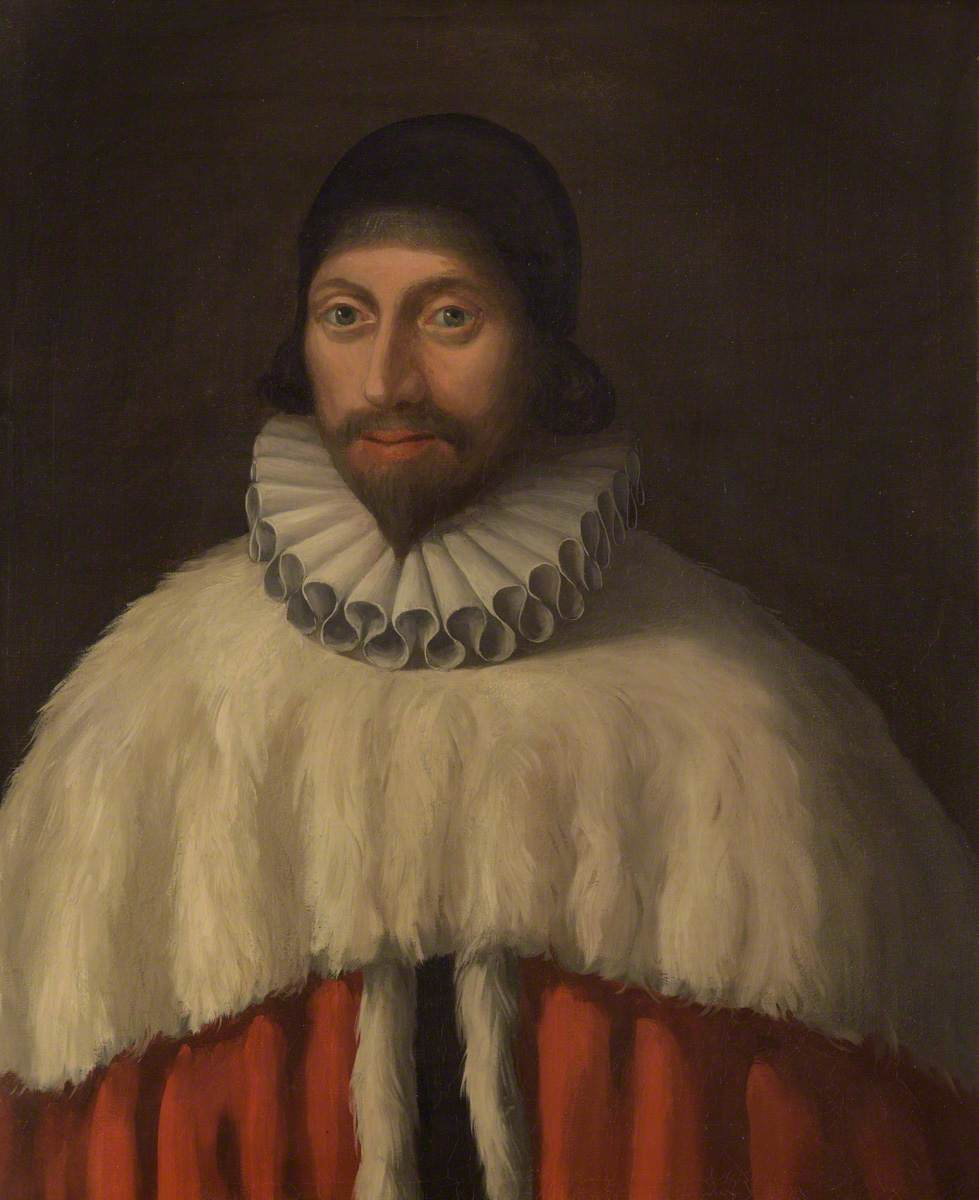
- Born: 1572; Bexwell, Norfolk
- Died: 1662 (aged 89–90)

Thomas Batchcroft (1572–1662) was Master of Gonville and Caius College, Cambridge from 1626 to 1649. In 1649 Batchcroft was ejected from the mastership of Caius, but he returned in 1660.

== Offices held ==
Academic offices
Preceded by William Dell	Master of Gonville and Caius College, Cambridge; 1660-1660	Succeeded by Robert Brady
Preceded by John Gostlin	Master of Gonville and Caius College, Cambridge; 1626-1649	Succeeded by William Dell
