= Ernest Stewart Roberts =

English academic (1847–1912)

The Reverend Ernest Stewart Roberts
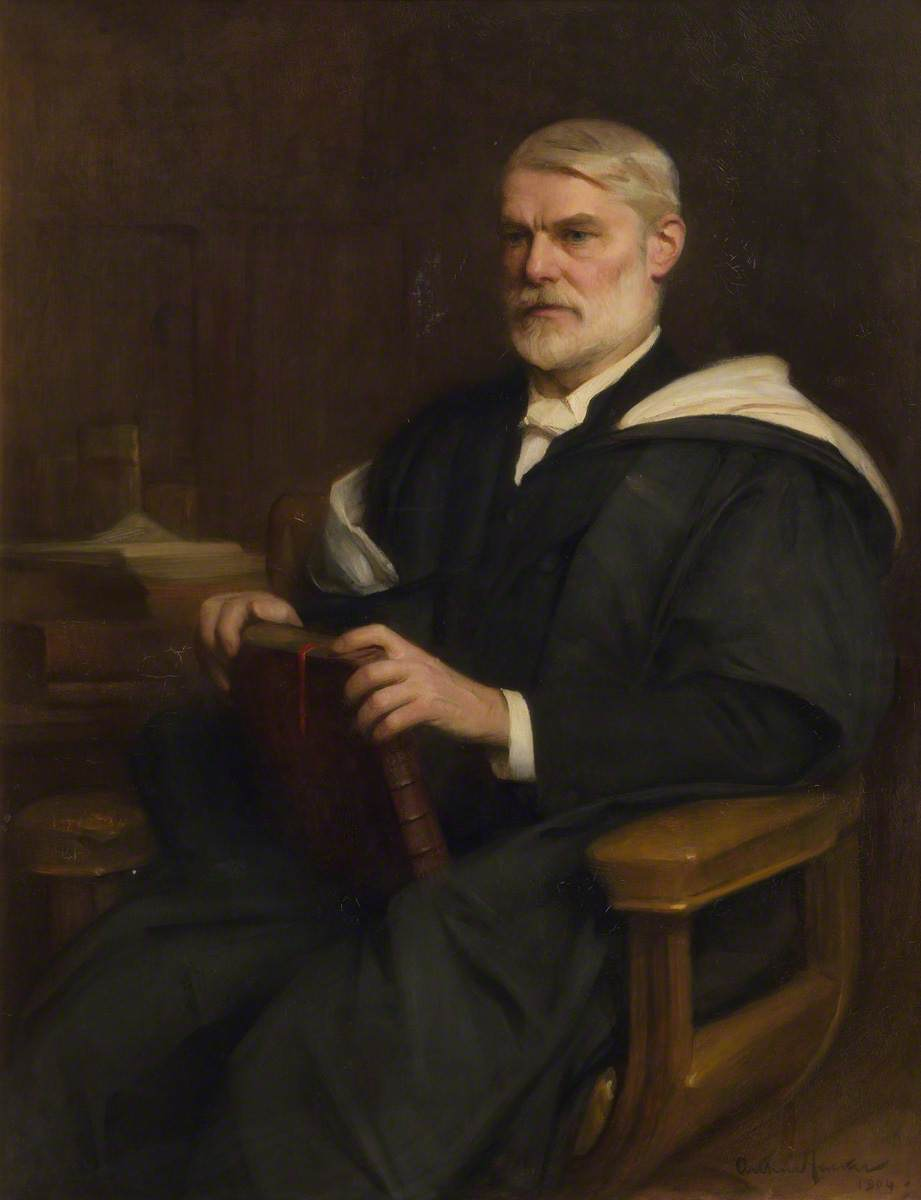
- Ernest Stewart Roberts by Arthur Hacker
- Born: 11 April 1847; Swineshead, Lincolnshire
- Died: 16 June 1912 (aged 65); Cambridge
- Education: Gonville and Caius College, Cambridge (1865)
- Scientific career
- Fields: Classics, Epigraphy
- Notable students: Ernest Arthur Gardner

Ernest Stewart Roberts (11 April 1847 – 16 June 1912) was a classicist and academic administrator. He served as master of Gonville and Caius College, Cambridge and vice-chancellor of the University of Cambridge (1906-1908).

== Career ==
Roberts was born in Swineshead, Lincolnshire, the son of Dr. S. B. Roberts. He was admitted to Caius in 1865, graduated BA in 1869, and was elected fellow in 1870 then senior tutor in 1885. He was elected president of the fellows in 1894 and master in February 1903. He was involved in the foundation of the college magazine, The Caian, and the college mission at Battersea and in the organisation of the college boat club. He served as major of the University Volunteers from 1886 to 1889 and lieutenant-colonel from 1889 to 1896.

He was also ordained deacon in 1877 and priest in 1879; Roberts was a college lecturer in classics, a Cambridge University lecturer in comparative philology and one of the significant influences on the study of epigraphy.

He is described in a memoir as being uninterested in "passing political problems... The clash of parties was distasteful to his temperament... He became more conservative and more reserved about political subjects as he grew older, and some of his earlier opinions were changed".

Roberts married in 1886 Mary Harper, daughter of Dr. Daniel Harper, Principal of Jesus College, Oxford.

He died in Cambridge and was buried at the Parish of the Ascension Burial Ground in Cambridge.

== Publications ==
The following books were written or edited by Ernest Stewart Roberts.

=== Author ===
- E.S. Roberts and Ernest Arthur Gardner, 1887. An Introduction to Greek Epigraphy, Vol. 1: The archaic inscriptions and the Greek alphabet. Cambridge University Press
- E.S. Roberts and Ernest Arthur Gardner, 1905. An Introduction to Greek Epigraphy, Vol. 2: The inscriptions of Attica. Cambridge University Press

=== Editor ===
- John Caius, The Sweating Sickness A boke or counseill against the disease commonly called the sweate or sweatyng sicknesse
- John Caius, De Pronunciatione Graecae & Latinae Linguae (in Latin)
- John Caius, De Rariorum Animalium atque Stirpium Historia (in Latin)

Academic offices
Preceded by Norman Macleod Ferrers	Master of Gonville and Caius College; 1903-1912	Succeeded by Hugh Kerr Anderson
Preceded by Edward Anthony Beck	Vice-Chancellor of the University of Cambridge; 1906-1908	Succeeded by Arthur James Mason
