= William Dell =

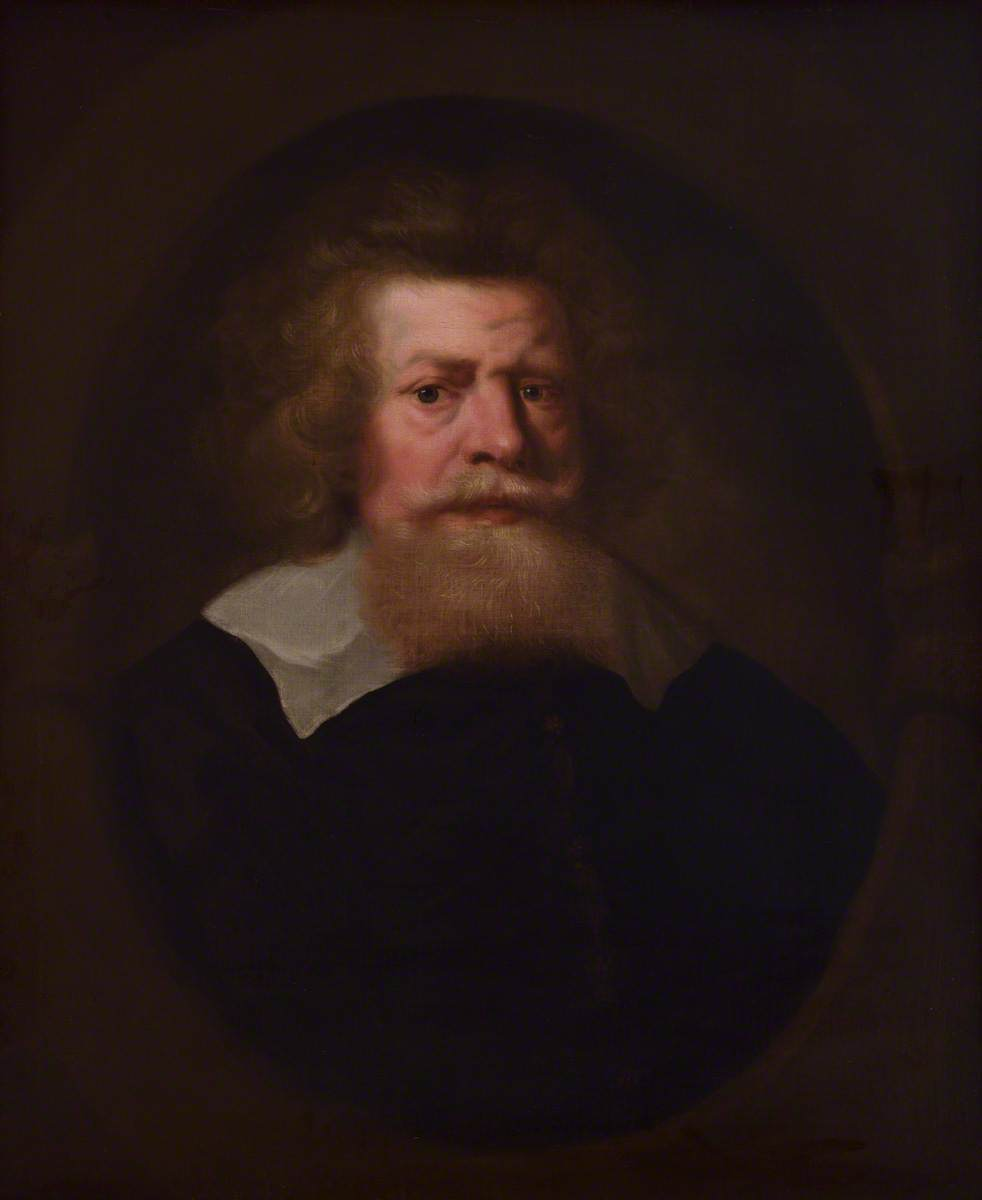
William Dell by Peter Lely

William Dell (c. 1607–1669) was an English clergyman, Master of Gonville and Caius College, Cambridge from 1649 to 1660, and prominent radical Parliamentarian.

== Biography ==
Dell was born at Bedfordshire, England, and was an undergraduate at Emmanuel College, Cambridge, taking an M.A. in 1631. He became a chaplain in the New Model Army, which brought radical ministry with it.

== Relationship to Parliament ==
Dell's 1646 sermon to the lower house in Parliament, following a controversial one to the House of Lords, was too extreme, and the House of Commons reprimanded him; it attacked the Westminster Assembly, spoke up for the poor, and told the politicians to keep out of religious reform. Nonetheless, his appointment at Caius was at the behest of the Rump Parliament. Thomas Harrison's proposal to have him preach again, in 1653, was defeated.

He criticized those on the Parliamentarian side who had done well out of the war. According to Christopher Hill

As the change of institutions failed to bring about the hoped-for transformation, Winstanley, Dell, Erbery, Vavasor Powell and others warned the Army leaders against avarice ambition, luxury.

He backed the Quaker John Crook as MP in 1653/4, and the regicide John Okey. He was a supporter of Oliver Cromwell. In 1657, however, he with Okey campaigned against the proposal to make Cromwell king.

== Theology ==
He was a friend and supporter of John Bunyan, whom he invited to preach in his parish church. He was an opponent of the Ranters; but also of enforced uniformity of worship, citing Martin Luther against it He was attacked as a libertine, and thought to tend to antinomianism. According to Christopher Hill

Antinomianism flourished in the revolutionary decades, fostered by the millennarian hope. Hobson, Dell, Denne and Milton flirted with it. as well as Cokayne and Bunyan.

He preached the doctrine of free grace, and subscribed to the idea of continuous revelation; and is included in those considered preachers of the Everlasting Gospel.

== Institutions ==
He argued for major institutional change. He attacked academic education frontally. He proposed a secular and decentralized university system; with local village schools, and grammar schools in larger places. He was strongly against the Aristotelian tradition persisting in the universities, and discounted all classical learning; and expressed broad anti-intellectual attitudes. He believed in more practical studies; more particularly, he was concerned that training for the ministry should be much more widely spread, geographically and socially, and less dependent on traditional academic studies.

He was a severe critic of the Church of England. He doubted the basis in scripture for a national Church, and eventually was buried outside it. He had egalitarian views on the suitable social composition of the bishops, and clergy in general. He connected this to religious control and change. Christopher Hill writes

Men like Winstanley, Erbery and Dell opened wide the door to the Quaker assertion that it was antichristian for 'such as a men of learning and have been at the university and have tongues' to 'be masters and bear rule in every parish, and none shall reprove or contradict what they say in public'.

He was against monarchy and tithes, with views close to the Levellers.

== After the Restoration ==
He was deprived of his living of Yelden in 1662; he had held it from 1642. A 1667 pamphlet of his, The Increase of Popery in England, was suppressed and appeared only in 1681; Hill calls this anti-Catholic attack 'partly a political gambit'

== Notes ==
Academic offices
Preceded by Thomas Batchcroft	Master of Gonville and Caius College; 1649–1660	Succeeded by Thomas Batchcroft
