= Brain Tumor Society =

Former U.S. nonprofit organization

The Brain Tumor Society (BTS) was a charitable organization based in Watertown, Massachusetts. It was founded in 1989.

In 2008, the Brain Tumor Society merged with the National Brain Tumor Foundation to form the National Brain Tumor Society.

== Mission ==
The mission of the BTS was strategically designed from the inception of the organization to have the greatest impact on all of those affected by a brain tumor, including caregivers and healthcare professionals. Their short-term goals were focused on improving the quality of life for patients, survivors and their families by providing psychosocial support and educational materials, such as their newsletter, Heads Up, and their comprehensive Resource Guide, Color Me Hope. For the long-term, they hoped to accelerate the discovery of new treatments and cures for this debilitating and often fatal disease by raising money to fund scientific research. Thus began their three-pronged approach of Research, Education and Support.
