= William Somersham =

William Somersham, D.D. was a priest and academic in the late 14th and early 15th centuries.

Somersham became a Fellow of Gonville Hall, Cambridge in 1376. He was ordained in December that year; and held livings at Hockwold cum Wilton and Hevingham. He was Master of Gonville from 1412 until his death in 1416.
