= Frank Stuart Spring =

Professor Frank Stuart Spring FRS FRSE FRIC

Freeland Professor of Chemistry, Royal College of Science and Technology
- In office 1946–1959

Personal details
- Born: 5 September 1907 Great Crosby, Lancashire, England
- Died: 1 March 1997 (aged 89)
- Occupation: Organic chemist

Frank Stuart Spring (5 September 1907 – 1 March 1997) was a British organic chemist.

== Life ==
He was born in Great Crosby, Lancashire on 5 September 1907, the fifth of six children of John Spring. He was educated at Waterloo Grammar School in Great Crosby. His father, a master mariner, was killed with his crew of 20 when his ship the Rhineland hit a German mine in the North Sea.

He received a grant from the Merchant Navy Trust to go to university and studied Chemistry at Liverpool University graduating BSc in 1928. Continuing as a postgraduate he gained a doctorate (PhD) in 1930.

In 1930 he began as an assistant lecturer in Chemistry at the University of Manchester rising to be Senior Lecturer by 1946. In 1946 he moved to the Royal College of Science and Technology in Glasgow as Professor of Chemistry.

He was elected a Fellow of the Royal Society of London in 1952 and a Fellow of the Royal Society of Edinburgh in 1958. His proposers for the latter were James Pickering Kendall, Neil Campbell, Mowbray Ritchie, Thomas Robert Bolam, and Sir Edmund Hirst.

In 1959, he left academia to become Director of Laporte Industries based in Luton.

He retired in 1971 and died on 1 March 1997, aged 89.

== Family ==
In 1932, he married Mary Mackintosh, of Heswall. They had a son, John, and daughter, Vivien.
