= William Dickson (chemist) =

Scottish chemist and educator

William Dickson TD MBE FRSE FRSC
- Born: 23 January 1905; St Abbs, Scotland
- Died: 21 October 1992 (aged 87); Lowestoft, Suffolk, England
- Occupations: Chemist and educator

William Dickson TD MBE FRSE FRSC (23 January 1905 – 21 October 1992) was a Scottish chemist and educator. He was the only British schoolteacher to be elected a Fellow of the Royal Society of Chemistry.

He was proud of his fishing heritage. A keen fisherman he held the claim to fame for catching one of Scotland’s largest ever halibut 77 pounds (35 kg). He believed that education, and teaching, should be enjoyable. His nickname amongst pupils was Cappy Dick.

== Life ==
He was born on 23 January 1905 in St Abbs on the south-east Scottish coast, the son of a lobster-fisherman. He was educated in St Abbs then strongly encouraged to continue his education at Berwickshire High School due to his clear talent. He then undertook teacher training at the newly created Moray House School of Education in Edinburgh. From there he won a place to study chemistry at the University of Edinburgh, graduating with a first class degree.

In 1931 he received a post of Science Master at Annan Academy on the south-west coast of Scotland. From 1936 he taught at George Watson’s College in Edinburgh. He also was Commanding Officer of the school’s Combined Cadet Force from this date and throughout the Second World War. In 1947 his shooting team won a bronze medal at Bisley. From 1948 he became Head of Chemistry at the school and from 1958 Head of Science.

He was elected a Fellow of the Royal Society of Edinburgh in later life, in March 1963. His proposers were Mowbray Ritchie, James Kendall, Neil Campbell, and Sir Edmund Hirst.

In teaching, he was credited from rescuing both Huntly Lorimer (now a Fellow of the Royal Society) and Lord Robert Hunter from academic obscurity and steering them towards an interest in science. In this he exemplifies the role of a true teacher. He was the first schoolteacher to be made a Fellow of the Royal Society of Chemistry.

Always connected to the sea, he died in Lowestoft on the English coast on 21 October 1992.

== Family ==
He was married to Zoe Royds, whom he called Mary. They had a daughter, Marjory, and two sons, Robert Royds and William.
