= Elizabeth Percival =

British research chemist

Ethel Elizabeth Percival
- Born: Ethel Elizabeth Kempson; 3 January 1906; Coventry, England
- Died: 16 April 1997 (aged 91)
- Education: Wolverhampton Girls School
- Alma mater: University of Birmingham, University of Edinburgh
- Occupation: Research chemist
- Employer(s): University of Birmingham, University of Edinburgh, Royal Holloway College
- Known for: Expert in algae polysaccharides
- Spouse(s): Edmund Percival (1934–1951), Richard H. McDowell (1962–1997)
- Children: 2
- Parent(s): Frank George Kempson and Emily Kempson
- Awards: Fellow of the Royal Society of Edinburgh, Fellow of the Royal Society of Chemistry

Ethel Elizabeth Percival, FRSE, FRSC (née Kempson, 3 January 1906 – 16 April 1997) was a British research chemist and expert in algae polysaccharides.

== Life ==
She was born Ethel Elizabeth Kempson in Coventry on 3 January 1906, the daughter of Frank George Kempson, an engineer, and his wife Emily. She was educated locally and at Wolverhampton Girls School.

She studied chemistry and botany at the University of Birmingham graduating with a BSc in 1928. She then became both secretary to Professor Norman Haworth and research assistant to the Chemistry Department.

In 1934, following her marriage to Edmund Percival, she moved with him to the University of Edinburgh. Due to pressures on the Department in the Second World War she began lecturing in the academic year 1939/40. Edinburgh awarded her a doctorate (PhD) in 1942. Following her husband's death in 1951 she was made an official lecturer. She also began research at the Institute of Seaweed Research in Musselburgh, just east of Edinburgh.

In 1952 she was elected a Fellow of the Royal Society of Edinburgh. Her proposers were Edmund Hirst, Christina Miller, Mowbray Ritchie and Neil Campbell. The University of Edinburgh awarded her a second doctorate (DSc) in 1962.

She moved to Virginia Water, Surrey in 1962 to be with her new husband, receiving a fellowship and lectureship from the Royal Holloway College in London under Professor Edward Bourne.

She was President of the British Psychological Society 1977/78. She was Chair of the Carbohydrate group within the Royal Society of Chemistry 1980/81.

She was a keen tennis player, playing at her local club (Knowle Hill) in Virginia Water into her 80s.

She died after a short illness on 16 April 1997 aged 91.

== Family ==
In 1934, she married colleague and fellow-chemist Edmund Percival (1907-1951) at St Pauls Church in Walsall. She continued much of his work following his premature death. Together they had one son and one daughter.

In 1962, she married Richard H. McDowell, also an algae scientist. They had no children.
