= Henry Bond (physician) =

British physician and academic

Professor Henry Bond FRCP

Regius Professor of Physic University of Cambridge
- In office 1851–1872
- Preceded by: John Haviland
- Succeeded by: Sir George Paget

Personal details
- Born: Henry John Hayles Bond; 22 December 1801 Wheatacre, Norfolk, England
- Died: 1 September 1883 (aged 81) Cambridge, Cambridgeshire, England
- Citizenship: United Kingdom
- Education: Norwich Grammar School
- Alma mater: Corpus Christi College, Cambridge
- Awards: Fellow of the Royal College of Physicians (1835)

Henry John Hayles Bond, FRCP (22 December 1801 – 1 September 1883) was a British physician and academic. From 1851 to 1872, he was Regius Professor of Physic at the University of Cambridge.

== Early life ==
Bond was born on 22 December 1801 in Wheatacre, Norfolk, England, to the Rev William Bond, an academic and clergyman, and his wife Martha Bond (née Hayles). He was educated at Norwich Grammar School, then an all-boys private school in Norwich. The high master at the time of his attendance was the Rev Edward Valpy. He then studied medicine in a variety of European cities including Cambridge, London, Edinburgh and Paris. He graduated from Corpus Christi College, Cambridge with a Bachelor of Medicine (MB) degree in 1825. In November 1828, he was awarded the Licentiate in Physic by the University of Cambridge. He remained to undertake postgraduate research and completed his Doctor of Medicine (MD) degree in 1831.

== Medical career ==
By the time of completing his doctorate in 1831, Bond had established a large medical practice in Cambridge. He was elected a Fellow of the Royal College of Physicians (FRCP) in 1835. He additionally worked as a physician in Addenbrooke's Hospital, Cambridge, after it was founded in 1842.

In 1851, he was appointed Regius Professor of Physic at the University of Cambridge. The General Medical Council was founded in 1958 and he was a member from 1858 to 1863. He lectured regularly at the university and his only publication, Analysis of an Elementary Course of Lectures on Pathology (1866), was a collection of some of his lectures. He stopped practising medicine towards the end of time at the University of Cambridge and he finally resigned the Regius Professorship in 1872.

== Later life ==
Bond retired from academia but remained living in Cambridge. In June 1882, he fractured his hip, which left him confined to a bed. On 3 September 1883, he died at his home on Regent Street, Cambridge; he was 81 years old. He was buried in one of the city's cemeteries.

== Personal life ==
On 11 December 1834, Bond married Mary Carpenter, daughter of William Carpenter. One of Mary's uncles was Sir Edward Berry, an admiral who had served with Horatio Nelson. Together, they had many children.
