= Gordon Whitby =

British physician and biochemist

Professor Gordon Whitby FRSE FRCP FRCPE FRCPath

Professor of Clinical Chemistry, University of Edinburgh
- In office 1963–1991

Personal details
- Born: Lionel Gordon Whitby; 18 July 1926 London, England
- Died: 12 March 2000 (aged 73) Edinburgh, Scotland
- Occupation: Physician, biochemist

Lionel Gordon Whitby (18 July 1926 – 12 March 2000) was a British physician and biochemist.

== Life ==
He was born in London on 18 July 1926 the son of the physicians Ethel Murgatroyd and Lionel Whitby. He was educated at Eton College then studied science at the University of Cambridge specialising in biochemistry under Dr Malcolm Dixon. Initially graduating with an MA it was only after obtaining his doctorate (PhD) that he then studied medicine. He graduated in the latter (MB ChB) in 1956 after practical training at Middlesex Hospital.

In 1958 he joined Hammersmith Hospital as registrar in the chemical pathology department. He was then awarded a Rockefeller Travelling Scholarship and went to the National Institute of Health at Bethesda in America. Here he studied adrenal hormone metabolism.

In 1960 he became biochemist to Addenbrooke's Hospital linked to the University of Cambridge, where his father was by then recently retired as Professor of Medicine. In 1963 he was the first person to hold the chair of Clinical Chemistry at the University of Edinburgh.

In 1968 he was elected a Fellow of the Royal Society of Edinburgh. His proposers were Neil Campbell, Sir Edmund Hirst, David Manners, and Mowbray Ritchie. He was Vice President of the Society from 1983 to 1986.

He twice served as Dean of the Faculty of Medicine: 1969 to 1972 and 1982 to 1986. He was vice principal of the university from 1979 to 1983. From 1963 to 1991 he also served as biochemist to the Edinburgh Royal Infirmary.

He retired in 1991 and died in Edinburgh on 12 March 2000 of a myocardial infarction following an operation on a stomach obstruction.

== Family ==
In 1949 he married Joan Hunter Sanderson. They had three children: Anne, Michael and Pamela.

== Publications ==
- Lecture Notes on Clinical Chemistry (1988)
