= Robert Brady (writer) =

English academic and historical writer

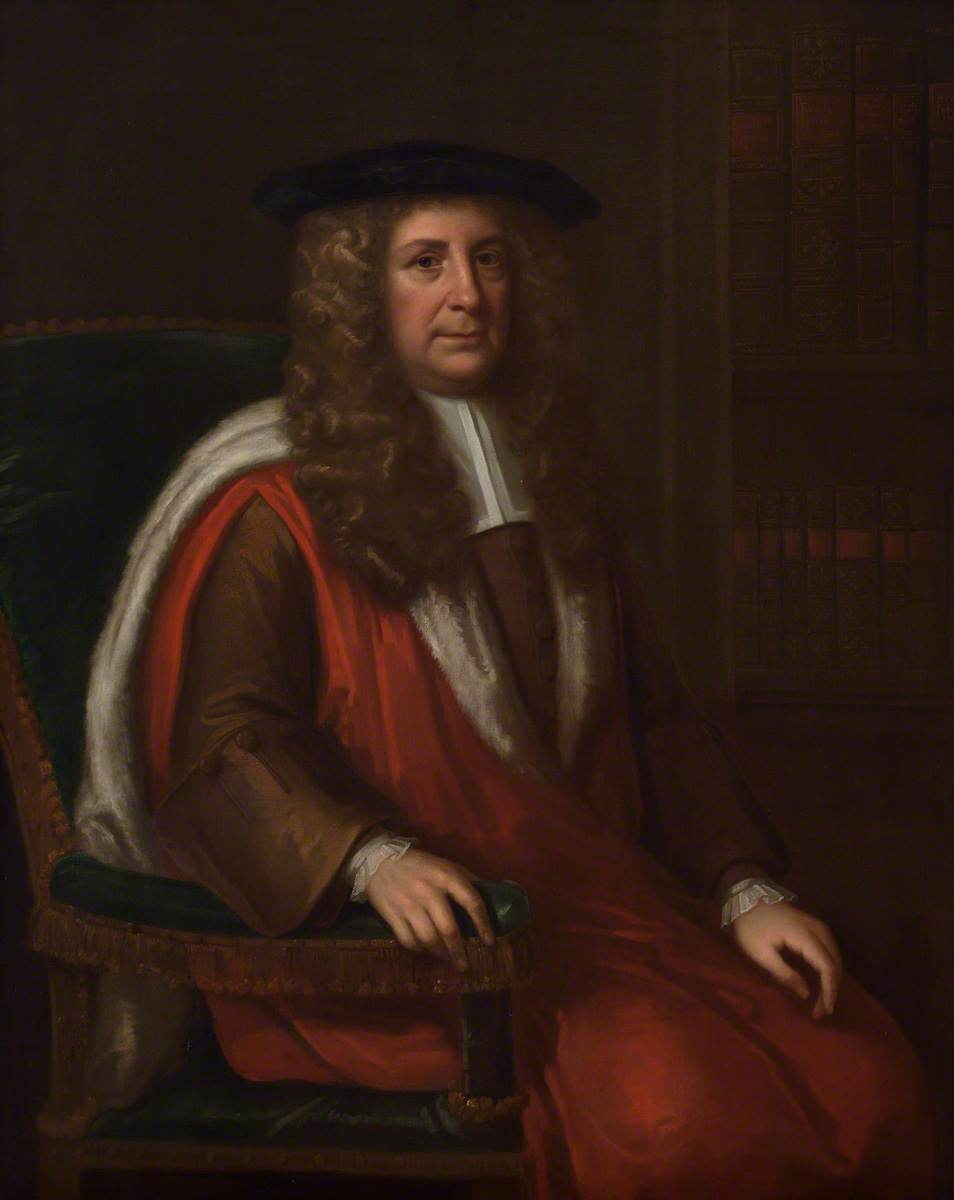
Robert Brady by Daniel de Koninck

Robert Brady MD (1627–1700) was an English academic and historical writer supporting the royalist position in the reigns of Charles II of England and James II of England. He was also a physician.

== Biography ==
Brady was born in Denver, Norfolk in 1627. He was son of Thomas Brady, an attorney of Denver, Norfolk. He was educated in Downham Market and at Caius College, Cambridge. He was made Master of Caius College in 1660, on the English Restoration. In the 1670s, he hoped to write for the prominent politicians Joseph Williamson and Anthony Ashley-Cooper, 1st Earl of Shaftesbury, but they declined the offer. It was only when William Sancroft became Archbishop of Canterbury that Brady found a patron.

Beginning in 1677, Brady held the position of Regius Professor of Physic at Cambridge. He sat as Member of Parliament for the University in 1681 and 1685.

In historical controversy, he was opposed to William Petyt and James Tyrrell, along what would become Tory versus Whig lines, then forming in the Exclusion crisis of the 1680s. Brady is regarded as holding to an uncompromising royalist position. Others on the Whig side were William Atwood, Edward Cooke, and Sir John Somers.

J. P. Kenyon takes him as a pioneer among the royalist scholars of English medieval history, who were working towards a formulation akin to Kenyon's viewpoint. John Pocock regards as "unforgettably damaging" the effect the (proto-)Tory Brady and others made, in attacking the doctrine of the "Ancient Constitution" as a failed description of the real circumstances of political arrangements in the England of the Middle Ages. On the narrow point of the actual legal effects of the Norman Conquest, Brady had been anticipated by Samuel Daniel, in views that are quite close to some modern scholars. He moved from there to argue for absolutism, and that Magna Carta was not a major charter for popular freedom. Brady's ideas drew on Henry Spelman and Robert Filmer.

David C. Douglas remarks that although his motivations as a scholar were at least as political as those of his opponents, his techniques were so far superior that his work remained of importance. Brady was aided in his later work by a position from 1686 in the archives of the Tower of London.

== Offices held ==
Academic offices
Preceded by Francis Glisson	Regius Professor of Physic; 1677–1700	Succeeded by Christopher Green
Preceded by Thomas Batchcroft	Master of Gonville and Caius College; 1660–1700	Succeeded by James Halman
Parliament of the United Kingdom
Preceded by Sir Thomas Exton; James Vernon	Member of Parliament for Cambridge University; 1681–1689; With: Sir Thomas Exton 1679–1689	Succeeded by Sir Isaac Newton; Sir Robert Sawyer

== Bibliography ==
- A Full and Clear Answer to a Book Written by William Petit, Esq. (1681)
- An Introduction to the Old English History (1684)
- A Complete History of England (1685)
- An Historical Treatise of Cities and Burghs (1690)
