= James Kendall =

James Kendall may refer to:

- James Kendall (politician) (1647–1708), English soldier, Member of Parliament and Governor of Barbados
- James Kendall (chemist) (1889–1978), English chemist
- James Tyldesley Kendall (1916–1991), American chemist and research physicist
- James Kendall (died c. 1874), bandleader, brother of Edward "Ned" Kendall
