= Lansdowne manuscripts =

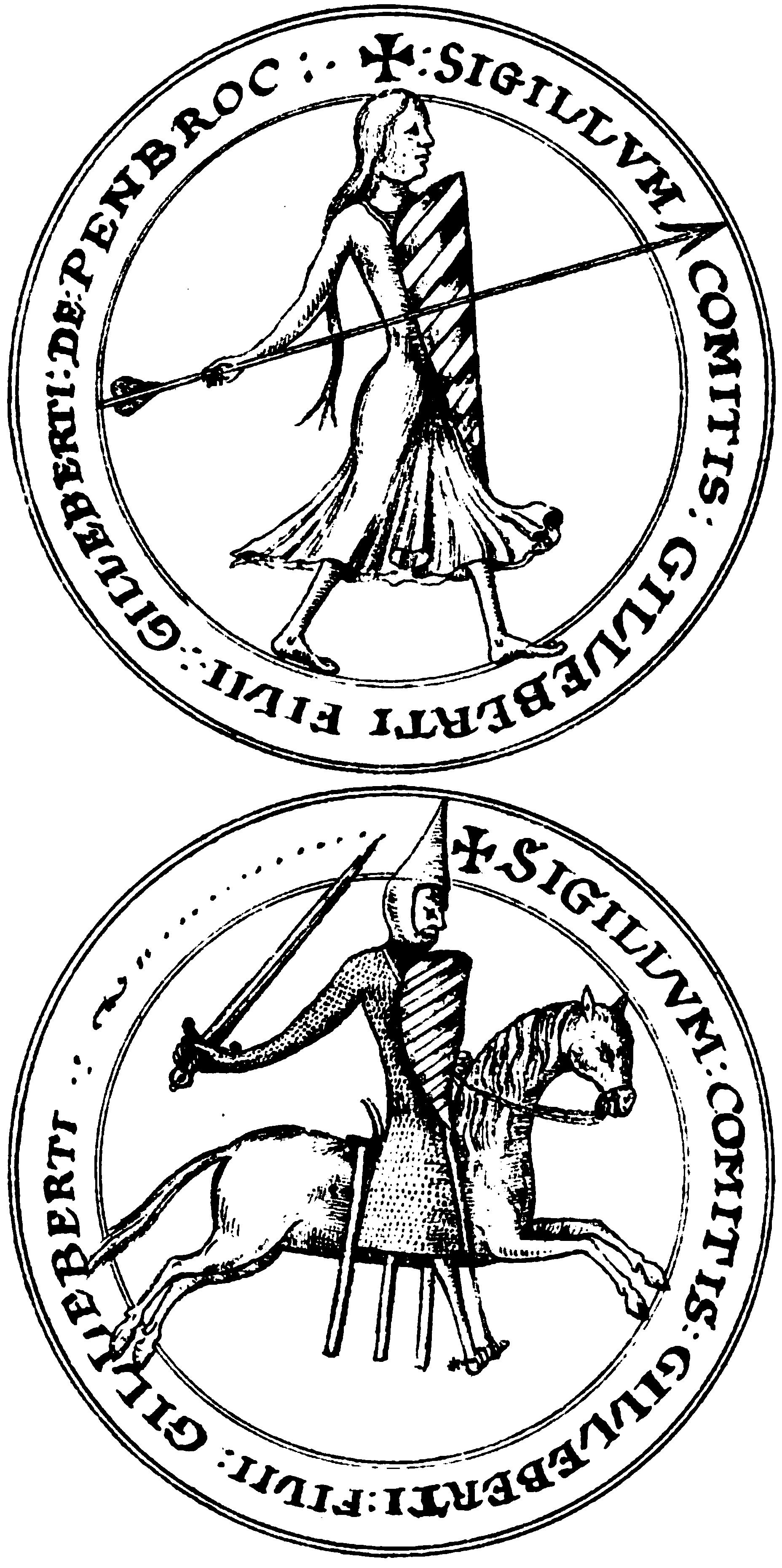
Seal of Gilbert de Clare, 1st Earl of Pembroke, from Lansdowne MS. 203.

The Lansdowne manuscripts are a significant named collection of the British Library, based on the collection of William Petty, 1st Marquess of Lansdowne. The purchase of the collection by the British Museum was in 1807.

The main features of the collection, as outlined by Nicholas Harris Nicolas, are:

- State papers and correspondence of Lord Burghley.
- Papers of Sir Julius Caesar.
- Papers of White Kennett; his manuscripts passed to James West and so to Lansdowne.
- Historical papers from the 15th century to 18th century, relating to major figures in English history.
- William Petyt's parliamentary papers, and papers of legal interest.
- Topographical and heraldic collections.
