= John Haviland (physician) =

English physician

- Born: 2 February 1785; Bridgwater, Somerset, England
- Died: 8 January 1851 (aged 65)
- Burial place: Fen Ditton, near Cambridge, England
- Occupation: Regius Professor of Physic (professor of medicine)
- Spouse: Louisa Pollen-Haviland
- Children: 5 recorded sons
- Parent(s): John Haviland; Mary Glover-Haviland

John Haviland (2 February 1785 – 8 January 1851) was a professor of medicine at Cambridge University's St John's College and a mainstay of the Cambridge Medical School through a difficult period.

== Life ==
Haviland's father, also called John, was a surgeon. His mother Mary Glover-Haviland, who appears to have inherited wealth, was a daughter of the vicar of St Mary's, Bridgwater. Haviland attended Winchester College for his secondary schooling and then, in 1803, became a student at St John's College, Cambridge. When he received his first degree in 1807, his marks placed him near the top of the list. He became a fellow of the college and received higher degrees from Cambridge successively in 1810, 1812 and 1817. At the same time, he was studying medicine, initially at Edinburgh and then in London at St Bartholomew's Hospital ("Barts"). He joined the London-based Royal College of Physicians in 1814, progressing to a fellowship there in 1818.

Settling in Cambridge, in 1814 Haviland succeeded Sir Busick Harwood as the university professor of anatomy. Three years later, in 1817, Sir Isaac Pennington died, and Haviland succeeded him both as the University Regius Professor of Physic and as physician to Addenbrooke's Hospital. At this point he resigned the anatomy professorship.

In 1839, which was the year of his 54th birthday, he resigned the Addenbrooke's job on health grounds, but he retained the Regius Professorship till his death in 1851.

== Personal ==
In 1819 Haviland married Louisa Pollen who was, like his mother, the daughter of an apparently well provided Church of England minister. The marriage produced five recorded sons.

By the time of his death Haviland had acquired a substantial property at Fen Ditton, roughly 5 km (3 miles) downstream from his college. He was buried in the churchyard at Fen Ditton.
