= Ralph Winterton =

English physician, academic and humanist

Ralph Winterton (1600–1636) was an English physician, academic and humanist. At the end of his life he became the Cambridge Regius Professor of Physic.

== Life ==
The son of Francis Winterton, he was born at Lutterworth, Leicestershire. He was sent to Eton College, and on 3 June 1617 was elected scholar of King's College, Cambridge, where he became a fellow on 3 June 1620. He matriculated in the university on 5 July 1617, graduated B.A. 1620, M.A. 1624. Suffering from sleeplessness and melancholia, he consulted the Regius Professor of Physic, Dr. John Collins, who advised him to give up mathematics, at which he was then working, and to study medicine, advice Winterton followed.

In 1625 Winterton was a candidate for the professorship of Greek, when Robert Creighton, who had for some time been deputy, was elected. Winterton then petitioned the visitor of King's College in May 1629, and on 20 August was formally diverted to the study of physic, which he had already pursued for four years. He received the university license to practise medicine in 1631, and on 16 September in that year petitioned King's College to grant him the degree of M.D. under its statutes. His request was refused, but was urged by John Hacket, writing from Buckden Palace on 25 January 1632, on behalf of the bishop of Lincoln, and by Bishop John Williams himself on 28 June 1632, as well as by the Earl of Holland on 28 November 1633, but all without effect. Some acrid theological discussion seems to have been the ground for these refusals. A letter of 12 December 1633 from Archbishop William Laud, to Samuel Collins, Provost of King's, saw the degree granted within two weeks.

The book Hippocratis Magni Aphorismi led to Winterton's appointment as Regius Professor of Physic in 1635. The course for the M.D. degree was then twelve years, and efforts were often made to obtain incorporation after graduation in other universities. These he put a stop to, as he announces in a letter, dated 25 August 1635, to Dr. Simeon Foxe, then president of the College of Physicians.

He died on 13 September 1636 at Cambridge, and was buried at the east end of King's College chapel.

== Works ==
Medical

He made a Greek metrical version of the first books of the aphorisms of Hippocrates in 1631, and early in 1633 published at Cambridge, with a dedication to William Laud, at that time bishop of London, ‘Hippocratis Magni Aphorismi Soluti et Metrici.’ Each aphorism is given in the original with the Latin version of Johannes Heurnius of Utrecht, and is rendered into Latin verse and Greek verse. The Latin verses are by John Fryer, president of the College of Physicians in 1549, whose name appears on the title-page.

The seven books of aphorisms are followed by epigrams in Latin or Greek in praise of Winterton's work by the regius professors of medicine at Cambridge and Oxford; by the president and seventeen fellows of the College of Physicians, of whom fourteen were Cantabrigians and three Oxonians; by Francis Glisson, afterwards professor of physic; by members of every college at Cambridge but one; by the professor of astronomy and members of several colleges at Oxford, concluding with twenty epigrams by members of King's College. Laudatory opinions in prose by the masters of Peterhouse, Christ's, and Trinity, and the president of Queens', and by two professors of divinity are prefixed.

Other works

In 1627 Winterton translated Johann Gerhard's ‘Meditations,’ in which he was encouraged by John Bowle; they were printed at Cambridge in 1631, and reached a fifth edition in 1638.

His brother Francis was one of six hundred volunteers, commanded by the Marquis of Hamilton, who went to serve under Gustavus Adolphus, and his death at Castrin in Silesia in 1631 depressed Winterton; he sought relief by translating the Considerations of Drexelius upon Eternitie of Jeremias Drexel, which was published at the Cambridge University press in 1636, and of which subsequent editions appeared in 1650 and 1658, 1675, 1684, 1703, 1705, and 1716. In 1632 he also translated and printed at Cambridge A Golden Chaine of Divine Aphorismes by Johann Gerhard. It contains commendatory verses in English by Edward Benlowes of St. John's College, and by four fellows of his own college, Dore Williamson, Robert Newman, Henry Whiston, and Thomas Page.

In 1633 he published at Cambridge an edition of Terence, and an edition of the Greek poem of Dionysius Periegetes, De Situ Orbis, with a dedication in Greek verse to Sir Henry Wotton, Provost of Eton.

While preparing the Greek aphorisms he also worked on an edition of the Poetæ minores Græci, based upon those of Henry Stephen (1566) and Jean Crispin (1600), with observations of his own on Hesiod. The book was published at Cambridge in 1635, with a dedication to Archbishop Laud, and subsequent editions appeared in 1652, 1661, 1671, 1677, 1684, 1700, and 1712. He published at Cambridge in 1631 Greek verses at the end of William Buckley's Arithmetica Memorativa, and in 1635 verses in Carmen Natalitium, and in Genethliacum Academiæ.

== Legacy ==
Winterton made his will on 25 August 1636, leaving bequests to his father, mother, brothers John, Henry, and William, and sisters Mary, Barbara, Fenton, and Ruth. To his brother John, who was a student of medicine at Christ's College, Cambridge and who wrote verses in ‘Carmen Natalitium,’ he gave the medical works of Daniel Sennertus in six volumes and of Martin Rulandus, and the surgery of William Clowes the younger, with his anatomy instruments.

== Notes ==
Attribution

This article incorporates text from a publication now in the public domain: "Winterton, Ralph". Dictionary of National Biography. London: Smith, Elder & Co. 1885–1900.
