= Sceloporus gadoviae =

Conservation status
- Least Concern (IUCN 3.1)

Scientific classification
- Kingdom: Animalia
- Phylum: Chordata
- Class: Reptilia
- Order: Squamata
- Suborder: Iguania
- Family: Phrynosomatidae
- Genus: Sceloporus
- Species: S. gadoviae

Binomial name
- Sceloporus gadoviae Boulenger, 1905

Synonyms
- Sceloporus gadoviae Boulenger, 1905; Lysoptychus gadoviae — Larsen & W. Tanner, 1975; Sceloporus gadoviae — Liner, 1994

Species of lizard

Sceloporus gadoviae, also known commonly as Gadow's spiny lizard and la espinosa de Gadow in Mexican Spanish, is a species of lizard in the family Phrynosomatidae. The species is endemic to Mexico.

== Etymology ==
The specific name, gadoviae, is in honor of Clara Maud Gadow (née Paget), who was the wife of German-British ornithologist Hans Friedrich Gadow.

== Geographic range ==
S. gadoviae is found in the Mexican states of Guerrero, Michoacán, Morelos, Oaxaca, and Puebla.

== Habitat ==
The preferred natural habitat of S. gadoviae is rocky areas in forest and shrubland, at altitudes of 1,000–1,800 m (3,300–5,900 ft).

== Description ==
S. gadoviae is moderate-sized for its genus. Maximum snout-to-vent length (SVL) is 6.8 cm (2.7 in). Dorsally, it is olive-brown.

== Reproduction ==
S. gadoviae is oviparous. Clutch size as about four eggs. Each egg measures about 14 mm × 7.5 mm (0.55 in × 0.30 in).
