= Christina Miller =

Scottish chemist (1899–2001)

- Born: 29 August 1899; Coatbridge, Scotland
- Died: 16 July 2001 (aged 101)
- Education: Edinburgh University; Heriot-Watt College
- Scientific career
- Thesis: Diffusion in solution (1924)
- Doctoral advisor: James Walker

Christina Cruikshank Miller FRSE (29 August 1899 – 16 July 2001) was a Scottish chemist and one of the first five women (also the first female chemist) elected to the Royal Society of Edinburgh (7 March 1949). Christina Miller was deaf from childhood and also lost the sight of one eye in a laboratory explosion in 1930. The Christina Miller Building within Edinburgh University's Kings Buildings is named in her honour, as is Christina Miller Hall at Heriot-Watt University.

== Early life ==
Christina Cruikshank Miller (Chrissie Miller) was born in 1899 in Coatbridge, Scotland to a stationmaster and was the eldest of two sisters. She suffered from measles and rubella at the age of five, causing her hearing to become damaged which became progressively worse throughout her life. Miller became interested in studying chemistry after reading a magazine article which showed industrial analytical chemistry as a potential career choice for women. Originally she had hopes to pursue a career in teaching but unfortunately her disabilities prevented this.

== Education ==
Miller simultaneously studied on a three-year degree course at Edinburgh University (1917-1920) and a four-year diploma course at Heriot-Watt College (1917-1921), now Heriot-Watt University, which took the form of evening classes during the First World War, during this period she was one of only three women to get a diploma in chemistry. In 1920 she graduated from Edinburgh University with a BSc with special distinction, won the class medal and was awarded the Vans Dunlop Scholarship which allowed her to undertake research for her PhD. She then went on to graduate from Heriot-Watt College in 1921. She approached Professor Sir James Walker in 1920 in the hopes of working under him at Edinburgh University and he instructed her to return in 1921 once she had learned German as much of the important literature of the time was written in German. In 1951 she was the only woman among the 25 first fellows of Heriot-Watt University.

== Research ==
Her PhD work was under the direction of Sir James Walker. She worked on verifying the Stokes-Einstein law for diffusion in solution. She studied how viscosity and temperature affected the diffusion of iodine in various solutions. The work was published in the Proceedings of the Royal Society.

Post PhD, Miller changed topic to working on phosphorus trioxide. In 1928 she obtained the first ever sample of pure Phosphorus trioxide and showed the luminescence observed in previous samples was due to the presence of dissolved phosphorus. The paper was awarded the Keith Medal from the Royal Society of Edinburgh. The success of this work led to her achieving her ambition to obtain a DSc before the age of 30. She was described by a leading inorganic chemist of that time as the greatest advance in knowledge of the topic in the last 20 years.

The research into phosphorus trioxide was curtailed following an explosion in which she lost the sight in one eye. Following this, Miller focused on developing techniques for Microanalysis. She focused on using these techniques to analyse rocks and metals.

In 1933 she was appointed director of the teaching laboratory and, through her commitment to innovation and new technology, strove to ensure that chemistry students received a thorough grounding in analytical chemistry.

In 1949 she was elected a Fellow of the Royal Society of Edinburgh. Her proposers were Sir James Pickering Kendall, Sir Edmund Hirst, John Edwin MacKenzie and J. Norman Davidson. She won the Society's Keith Medal for the period 1927–29.

== Legacy ==
University of Edinburgh established the Christina Miller Fellowship Scheme to support early-career researchers from backgrounds under-represented in chemistry research and academia (e.g. gender, minority ethnicity, disability, disadvantaged circumstances, etc.) Christina Miller Fellows at University of Edinburgh include: Dr Stephanie Urwin, Dr Ben Bhawal, Dr Antonia Mey, Dr Claire Hobday, Dr Amanda Jarvis, Dr Jennifer Garden. Hobday, Jarvis and Garden have all subsequently been awarded UKRI Future Leader Fellowships.

== Honours and awards ==
- Keith Medal 1929
- Fellow of Royal Society of Edinburgh 1949
- Honorary Fellowship of the Heriot Watt College 1951

== Retirement ==
Miller ended her career in 1961 due to her own health issues and to care for her mother and sister.

== Personal Letters to J.P. Ward ==
This article (PDF) contains twenty one personal letters by Dr Christina Cruickshank Miller to J. P. Ward, a former student and pupil, written between 1984 and 2001, the year in which she died aged almost 102.

== References in art and culture ==
Chrissie Miller appears as a character in the opera Breathe Freely by Scottish Composer Julian Wagstaff (The opera's title is borrowed from a book of the same name by fellow chemist James Kendall).
