= Edmund Percival =

Edmund George Vincent Percival, FRSE, FCS, FRIC (10 November 1907 – 27 September 1951) was a 20th-century British research chemist.

== Life ==
He was born in Hinckley in central England on 10 November 1907, the son of Elizabeth Martha Whittaker (1879-1949) and her husband, Albert Henry Percival (1877-1959). He was educated at King Edward VII Grammar School at Coalville in Leicestershire, and studied chemistry at the University of Birmingham, graduating in 1928 with a BSc with first class honours. After a year at McGill University in Canada (1929/30) under Prof Harold Hibbert, then further research in Birmingham with Sir Norman Haworth, where he was his senior research assistant, he gained his first doctorate (PhD) in 1932.

He began lecturing at the University of Edinburgh in 1933, receiving a second doctorate (DSc) in 1938. In 1941 he was elected a Fellow of the Royal Society of Edinburgh. His proposers were James Pickering Kendall, John Edwin MacKenzie, Thomas Robert Bolam and David Bain.

He volunteered as an air raid warden during World War II.

He became a Reader in Chemistry in 1948.

He died in Edinburgh on 27 September 1951 aged 43, and is buried in Liberton Cemetery, Edinburgh, along with his grandmother.

== Publications ==
- Structural Carbohydrate Chemistry (1950, 1962)

== Family ==
In 1934 he married colleague and fellow-chemist Ethel Elizabeth (Betty) Kempson (1906-1997) at St Pauls Church in Walsall. They had one daughter (Sheila Morag) and one son (John Kempson). In 1962 Betty married Richard Henry McDowell.
