= J. S. Mitchell =

British radiotherapist and academic

- Born: Joseph Stanley Mitchell; 22 July 1909; Birmingham, West Midlands
- Died: 22 February 1987 (aged 77); Cambridge, Cambridgeshire
- Education: University of Birmingham; St John's College, Cambridge
- Awards: Commander of the Order of the British Empire (1951); Fellow of the Royal Society (1952); Fellow of the Royal College of Physicians (1958)
- Scientific career
- Workplaces: St John's College, Cambridge; Chalk River Laboratories; University of Cambridge
- Thesis: The irradiation of thin protein films (1937)
- Doctoral advisor: Sir Eric Rideal

Joseph Stanley Mitchell, CBE, FRS, FRCP (22 July 1909 – 22 February 1987) was a British physician, radiotherapist and academic. He was Regius Professor of Physic at the University of Cambridge from 1957 to 1975.

== Early life ==
Mitchel was born on 22 July 1909 in Birmingham, England. He was only son and the eldest child born to Joseph Brown Mitchell and his wife Ethel Maud Mary Mitchell (née Arnold). He was educated at Marlborough Road School and at King Edward's School, Birmingham, a boys school. He had been awarded an open scholarship to attend King Edward's School.

In 1926, he won a state scholarship to the University of Birmingham. Having undertaken preclinical studies at Birmingham, in 1928 he won a scholarship to St John's College, Cambridge. At Cambridge he studied the Natural Science Tripos, and was awarded first class honours in Part I in 1930 and Part II in 1931, graduating with a Bachelor of Arts (BA) degree. Having specialised in physics in Part II, he was advised by Lord Rutherford to return to Birmingham to undertake his clinical training. He did so and graduated Bachelor of Medicine, Bachelor of Surgery (MB BChir) from the University of Cambridge in 1934.

== Career ==
Mitchell began his medical career as a house officer at Birmingham General Hospital. He returned to the University of Cambridge as a postgraduate studying under Sir Eric Rideal. During this time, he held the Elmore research studentship and then the Beit Memorial Fellowship for Medical Research. He was elected a fellow of St John's College, Cambridge in 1936. In 1937, he completed his Doctor of Philosophy (PhD) degree on 'the irradiation of thin protein films'.

From 1937 to 1938, he worked as a radiological officer at the Christie Hospital, a centre that specialised in the treatment of cancer, based in Manchester. In 1938, he returned to the University of Cambridge where he joined the Department of Medicine as an assistant to J. A. Ryle, the then Regius Professor of Physic. In 1939, with the outbreak of World War II, he became radiotherapist with the Emergency Medical Service in Cambridge. In 1943, he joined the newly opened Radiotherapeutic Centre at Addenbrooke's Hospital. In 1944, he joined the Chalk River Laboratories, Canada, as head of medical investigations for the joint British-Canadian atomic energy project. He ensured the safety of the workers and undertook research into the biological effects of radiation. During this research he discovered the possibility of using the radioactive isotope cobalt-60 to treat cancer.

In 1946, he returned to England and became Professor of Radiotherapeutics at the University of Cambridge. He was also appointed Director of the Radiotherapeutic Centre at Addenbrooke's Hospital. During this appointment he became internationally known for his work on the treatment of cancer by irradiation. In 1957, he was appointed Regius Professor of Physic, succeeding Sir Lionel Whitby. In 1958, he gave the Dunham Lectures at Harvard University. He oversaw the expansion of medical teaching at Cambridge, including the introduction of two new chairs; Professor of Medicine in 1963 and Professor of Surgery in 1965. He also oversaw the development of the new School of Clinical Medicine. In 1975, he stepped down from the Regius Professorship and returned to his previous appointment of Professor of Radiotherapeutics.

He retired from academia and clinical medicine in 1976.

== Personal life ==
In 1934, Mitchell married Lilian Mary Buxton who was eight years his senior. together they had two children; a son and a daughter. His wife predeceased him in 1983 but he was survived by his children.

In retirement he continued to live in Cambridge in a house on Huntingdon Road. He died on 22 February 1987 in Cambridge.

== Honours ==
In 1952, Mitchell was elected a Fellow of the Royal Society (FRS). He was elected a Fellow of the Faculty of Radiologists (FFR) in 1954 and a Fellow of the Royal College of Physicians (FRCP) in 1958. In 1975, when the Faculty of Radiologists became a Royal College, he became a Fellow of the Royal College of Radiologists (FRCR).

In the 1951 King's Birthday Honours, he was appointed Commander of the Order of the British Empire (CBE). In 1967, he was awarded the Pirogoff medal by the USSR Academy of Sciences.
