= Balloonist theory =

Theory in early neuroscience that attempted to explain muscle movement

Balloonist theory was a theory in early neuroscience that attempted to explain muscle movement by asserting that muscles contract by inflating with air or fluid. The Roman and Greek physician Galen believed that muscles contracted due to a fluid flowing into them, and for 1500 years afterward, it was believed that nerves were hollow and that they carried fluid. René Descartes, who was interested in hydraulics and used fluid pressure to explain various aspects of physiology such as the reflex arc, proposed that "animal spirits" flowed into muscle and were responsible for their contraction. In the model, which Descartes used to explain reflexes, the spirits would flow from the ventricles of the brain, through the nerves, and to the muscles to animate the latter.

In 1667, Thomas Willis proposed that muscles may expand by the reaction of animal spirits with vital spirits. He hypothesized that this reaction would produce air in a manner similar to the reaction that causes an explosion, causing muscles to swell and produce movement. This theory has now been superseded by the mainstream scientific community due to the establishment of neuroscience, which is supported by empirical evidence.

== Physiological refutations of the theory ==
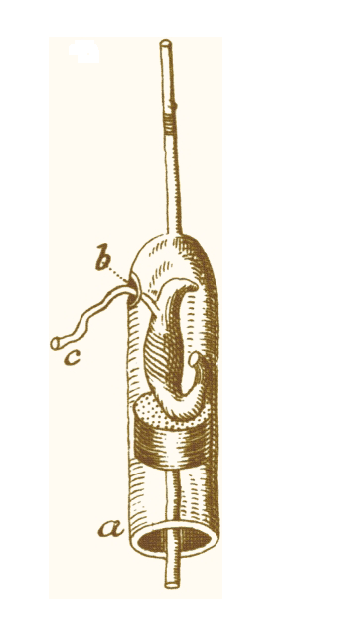
Swammerdam's illustration of a nerve-muscle preparation. He placed a frog thigh muscle in a glass syringe with a nerve protruding from a hole in the side of the container. Irritating the nerve caused the muscle to contract, but the level of the water, and thus the volume of the muscle, did not increase.

In 1667, Jan Swammerdam, a Dutch anatomist famous for working with insects, struck the first important blow against the balloonist theory. Swammerdam, who was the first to experiment on nerve-muscle preparations, showed that muscles do not increase in size when they contract (and he supposed if a substance such as animal spirits flowed into muscles, their volume should increase when they contract). Swammerdam placed severed frog thigh muscle in an airtight syringe with a small amount of water in the tip. He could thus determine whether there was a change the volume of the muscle when it contracted by observing a change in the level of the water (image at right). When Swammerdam caused the muscle to contract by irritating the nerve, the water level did not rise but rather was lowered by a minute amount; this showed that no air or fluid could be flowing into the muscle. Swammerdam did not believe the results of his own experiment, suggesting that they were the result of artifact. However, he concluded in his book The Book of Nature II that "motion or irritation of the nerve alone is necessary to produce muscular motion". This idea was an important step toward the current understanding of how nerves actually cause muscle contraction.

Balloonist theory took a second hit from Francis Glisson who performed an experiment in which a man flexed a muscle under water. The water level did not go up (in fact it went down slightly), further supporting the conclusion that no air or fluid could be entering the muscle.

Giovanni Alfonso Borelli performed an experiment to test the idea that muscle is inflated by air. He slit the muscle of an animal under water and watched to see whether bubbles of air would rise to the surface. Since no bubbles were seen to rise, this experiment helped to refute the balloonist theory.

The invention of the microscope allowed preparations of nerves to be viewed at high magnification, showing that they are not hollow.

In 1791, Luigi Galvani learned that frogs' muscles could be made to move by the application of electricity. This finding provided a basis for the current understanding that electrical energy (carried by ions), and not air or fluid, is the impetus behind muscle movement.

== See also ==
- Passions of the Soul
