= Lionel Whitby =

British haematologist (1895–1956)

Brigadier Sir Lionel Whitby CVO MC TD
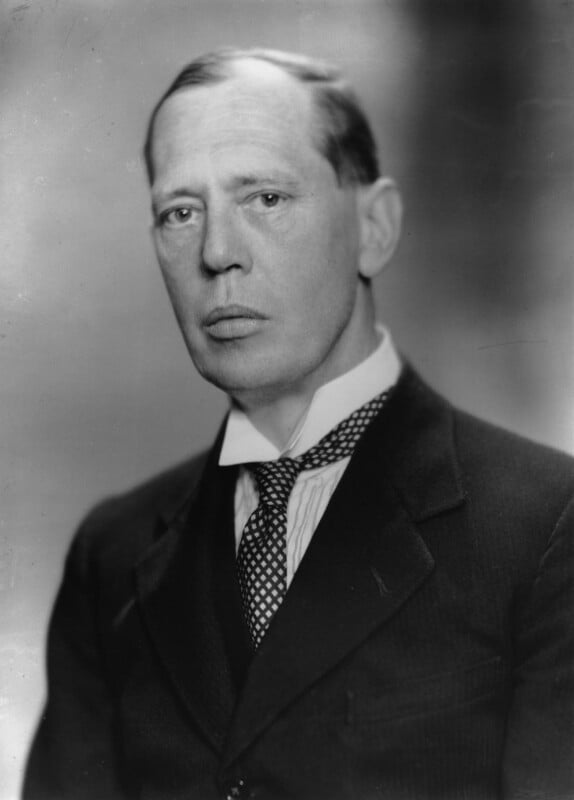
- Whitby in 1947
- Born: Lionel Ernest Howard Whitby; 8 May 1895; Yeovil, Somerset, England
- Died: 24 November 1956 (aged 61); London, England
- Alma mater: Downing College, Cambridge
- Spouse: Ethel Murgatroyd (m. 1922)
- Children: Gordon Whitby
- Military career
- Branch: British Army
- Service years: 1914–1918; 1938–1942
- Rank: Brigadier
- Units: 3rd Battalion, Royal West Kent Regiment
- Conflicts: World War I Battle of Passchendaele; Gallipoli Campaign
- Awards: John Hunter triennial medal and prize of the Royal College of Surgeons; Gold medal of the Royal Society of Medicine
- Other work: Regius Professor of Physic; Master of Downing College; Vice-Chancellor of the University of Cambridge

Brigadier Sir Lionel Ernest Howard Whitby, CVO, MC (8 May 1895 – 24 November 1956) was a British haematologist, British Army officer and academic. He served as Regius Professor of Physic at the University of Cambridge from 1945 to 1956, Master of Downing College, Cambridge from 1947 to 1956, and Vice-Chancellor of the University of Cambridge from 1951 to 1953.

== Early life ==
Whitby was born on 8 May 1895 in Yeovil, Somerset. He was the second of three sons born to Benjamin Whitby and his wife, Jane Elizabeth Whitby (née Milborne). He was educated at King's College, a private school in Taunton, Somerset, and at Bromsgrove School, an independent school in Bromsgrove, Worcestershire. In 1914, having completed his schooling, he was awarded a senior open scholarship to attend Downing College, Cambridge. However, he did not immediately take up his place at the University of Cambridge, and instead enlisted in the military at the start of World War I.

Having returned from military service as a decorated but disabled officer, he returned to studies. In October 1918, he took up his scholarship and matriculated into Downing College, Cambridge, to study medicine. After completing his theoretical studies he moved to Middlesex Hospital in London to complete his training. He was awarded the Freeman Scholarship and the Leopold Hudson Prize in 1922, and the Hetley Clinical Prize in 1923. In 1923, he graduated Bachelor of Medicine, Bachelor of Surgery (MB BChir). He was awarded a Diploma of Public Health (DPH) in 1924.

== Career ==
=== World War I military service ===
Rather than take up his place at the University of Cambridge, with the outbreak of World War I, Whitby joined the Royal Fusiliers, British Army, as a private. On 16 May 1915, he was commissioned into the 3rd Battalion, Royal West Kent Regiment, as a second lieutenant (on probation). He trained and served as a machine gun officer. In October 1915, his commission and rank were confirmed. On 1 December 1916, he was made a temporary lieutenant. On 1 July 1917, his promotion to lieutenant was confirmed. On 10 October 1917, while attached to the Machine Gun Corps, he was made an acting captain to command a company. On 19 February 1918, while attached to the Machine Gun Corps, he was further promoted to acting major

During World War I, he saw active service in the Serbian Campaign, in the Gallipoli campaign, at the Macedonian front, and at the Western Front. In 1917, he fought at the Battle of Passchendaele and was awarded the Military Cross (MC) for gallantry during the battle.

On 15 November 1918, he retired from the British Army on the grounds of ill health. He was granted the honorary rank of major. He had received a wound in battle in March 1918, that resulted in one of his legs having to be amputated. He was haemorrhaging from the femoral artery but an American doctor managed to stop the bleed and Whitby survived the trauma.

=== Medical career ===
In 1923, Whitby began his career in medicine having received an appointment at Middlesex Hospital as an assistant pathologist. In 1927, he was awarded the degree of Doctor of Medicine (MD) by the University of Cambridge. From 1928 to 1929, he was part of a team of medical staff who cared for the ailing King George V. For the next ten years, he practised as a clinical pathologist and began his research into haematology.

In addition to his medical practice, Whitby was an ardent researcher. From 1935 to 1938, he researched the used of the new drug group sulphonamide. He discovered and perfected 'M and B 693', a first generation sulphonamide antibiotic.

His publications during this period included Medical Bacteriology (1928), The Laboratory in Surgical Practice (1931), and Disorders of the Blood (1935).

=== World War II military service ===
On 12 July 1938, Whitby was promoted to colonel in the Royal Army Medical Corps, Territorial Army. On 2 September 1939, he was called up for active service and transferred from the TA Reserve of Officers (RAMC) to the Territorial Army (Commands and Staff). He was promoted to brigadier on 1 March 1942, when he was commanding officer of the Army Blood Transfusion Service at Southmead Hospital in Bristol.

== Personal life ==
Whitby's wedding, to Ethel Murgatroyd, took place in Halifax (England) in the late summer of 1922. His wife was herself a qualified surgeon and physician.

The marriage produced three sons and one daughter. These included the biochemist Lionel Gordon Whitby FRSE (1926-2000).

Sir Lionel Whitby died in London.

== Honours ==
In 1929, Whitby was appointed Commander of the Royal Victorian Order (CVO) in recognition of his role in the treatment of King George V. In the 1945 New Year Honours, when he was commanding officer of the Army Blood Transfusion Service at Southmead Hospital in Bristol it was announced he was to be made a Knight Bachelor 'for services in the development of the sulphonamide group of drugs'. On 13 February 1945, he was knighted at Buckingham Palace by King George VI.

In 1938, he was awarded the John Hunter triennial medal and prize by the Royal College of Surgeons for his work in the development of the clinical use of sulphapyridine. In July 1945, he was awarded the Gold Medal of the Royal Society of Medicine in recognition of his work on wound shock and blood transfusions. The President of the RSM, Sir Gordon Gordon-Taylor, jokingly described Whitby as 'the greatest vampire the world has known'.

Academic offices
Preceded by John Ryle	Regius Professor of Physic at the University of Cambridge; 1945–1956	Succeeded by J. S. Mitchell
Preceded by Sir Herbert Richmond	Master of Downing College, Cambridge; 1947–1956	Succeeded by W. K. C. Guthrie
Preceded by John Sandwith Boys Smith	Vice-Chancellor of the University of Cambridge; 1951–1953	Succeeded by Sir Eric Ashby
