= Jennifer Garden =

British chemist

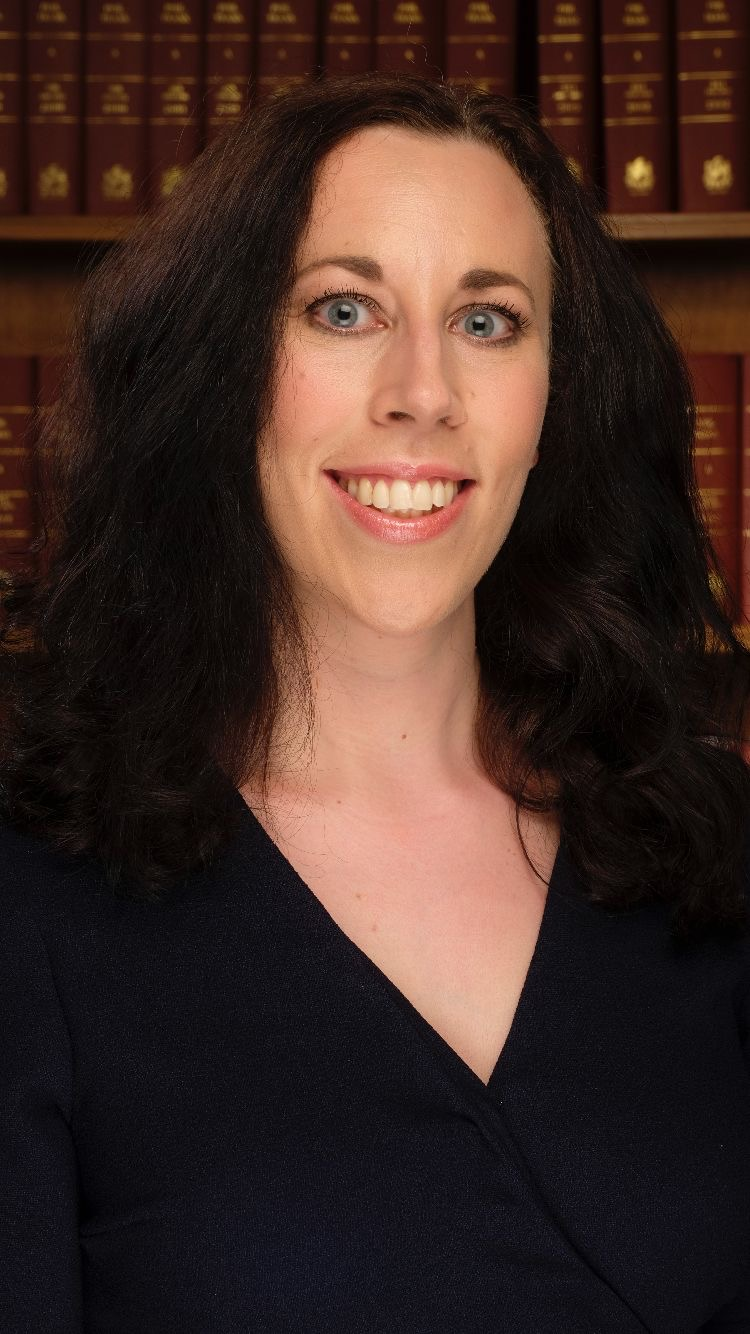
- Garden in 2018
- Born: Jennifer Anne Garden
- Education: University of Strathclyde
- Awards: Royal Society of Chemistry Sir Edward Frankland Fellowship, UKRI Future Leaders Fellowship, L'Oréal-UNESCO For Women in Science Awards
- Scientific career
- Fields: Catalysis, polymer chemistry, sustainable chemistry, organometallic chemistry
- Workplaces: University of Edinburgh, Imperial College London
- Thesis: Advances in synthetic, structural and reaction chemistry of zinc and zincate complexes containing alkyl and/or amido ligands (2014)
- Doctoral advisor: Professor Robert Mulvey
- Website: https://www.gardengroupchemistry.com/

Jennifer "Jenni" Anne Garden is a UKRI Future Leaders Fellow in the Department of Chemistry at the University of Edinburgh, where she leads a research group investigating how catalyst design and organometallic chemistry can be used to develop sustainable and degradable plastics using renewable sources.

== Early life and education ==
Garden carried out her undergraduate studies in chemistry at the University of Strathclyde, obtaining a Master of Science in 2010. She was awarded the Andersonian Centenary Medal Prize for most outstanding final-year chemistry student.

She continued at the University of Strathclyde for her doctoral studies in chemistry, investigating the development of new zinc and zincate complexes for applications in metallation reactions and obtaining her PhD in 2014. She was awarded the Hamilton-Barret Prize for her first-year PhD research (2011), and the Ritchie Chemistry Prize for best PhD thesis (2015).

== Research career ==
Garden joined the Department of Chemistry at Imperial College London as a postdoctoral researcher in 2014, where her work investigated the synthesis and design of new heterometallic catalysts for applications in copolymerisation reactions between carbon dioxide/epoxide.

In 2016, Garden was awarded the inaugural Christina Miller Fellowship by the University of Edinburgh, where she currently leads a research group in the Department of Chemistry. Her research interests lie in combining approaches from organometallic chemistry and catalyst design to develop sustainable polymer materials (plastics) that can be effectively recycled and generated from renewable sources. Her research has been funded and recognised by the British Ramsay Memorial Trust (2017), the L'Oréal-UNESCO For Women in Science UK & Ireland Fellowship and the UK Research and Innovation Future Leaders Fellowship (2020).

Garden is also part of the editorial advisory board of the American Chemical Society's Macromolecules journal.

== Awards and honours ==
Garden has won numerous prizes and fellowships for her contributions to the field of homo- and hetero-metallic catalysis and the advancement in developing such catalysts for applications in polymerisation chemistry and sustainable plastics.

- Dalton Fellowship early career award: Sir Edward Frankland Fellowship from the Royal Society of Chemistry (2021)
- UKRI Future Leaders Fellowship (2020)
- L'Oréal-UNESCO International Rising Talents Award (2020)
- Macro Group UK Young Researchers Medal (2020)
- L'Oréal-UNESCO For Women in Science UK & Ireland Fellowship (2019)
- British Ramsay Memorial Trust Fellowship (2017)
- Christina Miller Research Fellowship from the University of Edinburgh (2016)
