= Anolis gadovii =

Conservation status
- Least Concern (IUCN 3.1)

Scientific classification
- Kingdom: Animalia
- Phylum: Chordata
- Class: Reptilia
- Order: Squamata
- Suborder: Iguania
- Family: Dactyloidae
- Genus: Anolis
- Species: A. gadovii

Binomial name
- Anolis gadovii Boulenger, 1905

Synonyms
- Anolis gadovii Boulenger, 1905; Anolis gadowi — Duellman, 1965; Anolis gadovi — Hedges et al., 1992; Norops gadovii — Liner, 1994; Anolis gadovii — Liner, 2007

Species of lizard

Anolis gadovii, also known commonly as Gadow's anole and el abaniquillo de Gadow in Mexican Spanish, is a species of lizard in the family Dactyloidae. The species is endemic to Mexico.

== Etymology ==
The specific name, gadovii, is in honor of German ornithologist Hans Friedrich Gadow.

== Geographic range ==
A. gadovii is found in the Mexican state of Guerrero.

== Habitat ==
The preferred natural habitat of A. gadovii is forest near rivers and streams, at altitudes from sea level to 1,300 m (4,300 ft).

== Description ==
A. gadovii is the only Mexican Anolis species with a dorsal color pattern of dark wavy lines and blotches. Ventrally, it is white. Moderate-sized for its genus, males may attain a snout-to-vent length (SVL) of 7.6 cm (3.0 in). Females are smaller, attaining 6.3 cm (2.5 in).

== Reproduction ==
A. gadovii is oviparous.
