= Christopher Green (physician) =

British medical academic

Christopher Green (1652–1741) was a Cambridge academic, Regius Professor of Physic from 1700 to 1741.

The son of another Christopher Green, cook of Caius College, Green was christened at St Botolph's church, Cambridge, on 23 February 1651/52. He was seven years at the school of a Mr Griffith before he was admitted to Caius at the age of sixteen on 13 December 1667 and was a scholar from Michaelmas 1668 until Lady Day 1674, when he was elected a junior Fellow of his college. He graduated Bachelor of Arts in 1671-72 and Master of Arts in 1675, and from 1676 was ethical lecturer in the college. He was dean in 1682 and steward from 1684 to 1686, during which time he graduated Doctor of Medicine in 1685. He was appointed college bursar in 1687, then the next year lecturer in Greek.

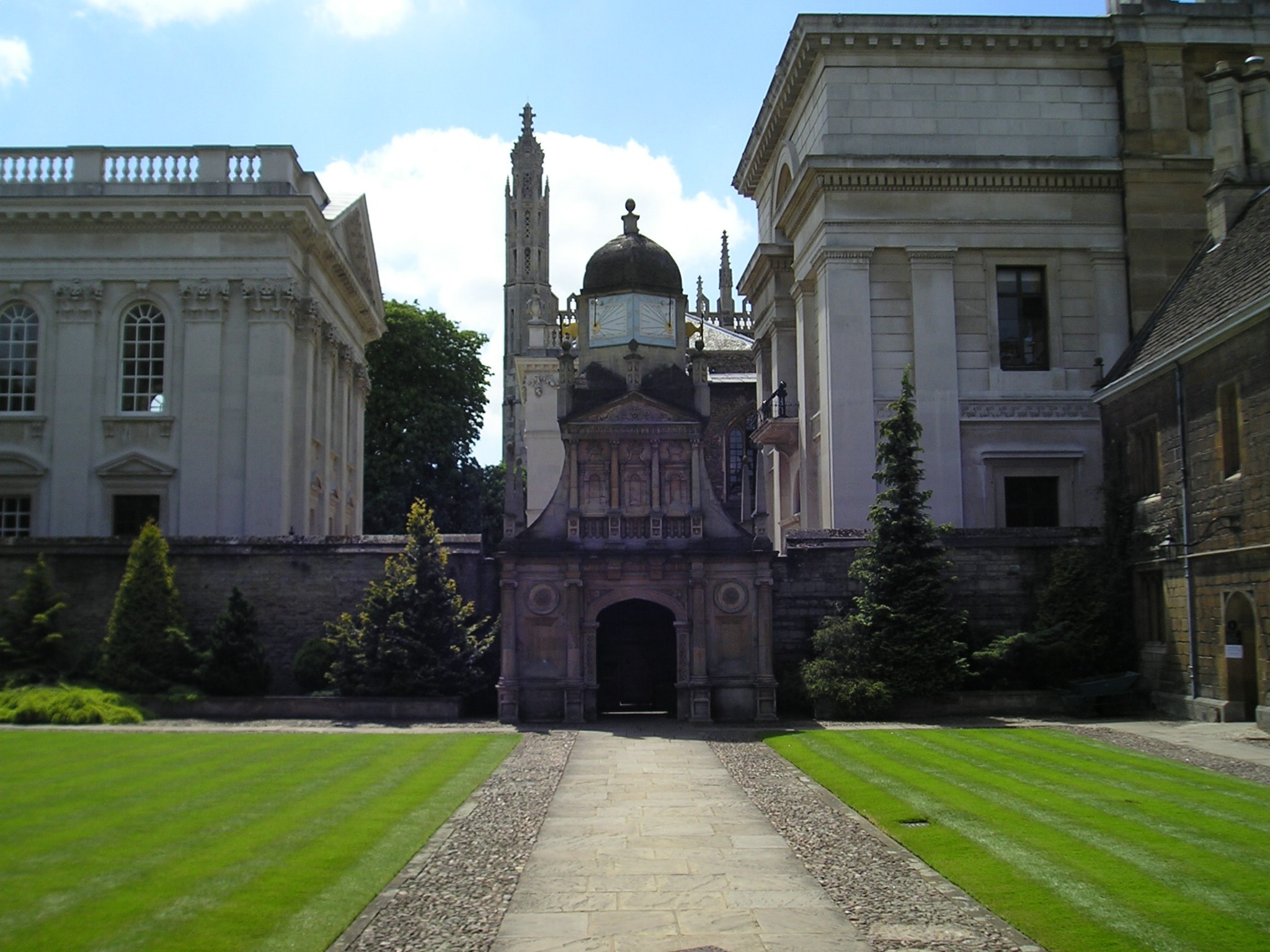
The Gate of Honour at Caius College, built 1574

On 21 January 1688/89, Green married at Hildersham Susan Flack of Linton.

In 1700, Green gained the important university chair of Regius Professor of Physic, which he held for more than forty years until his death on 1 April 1741. The foundation of the Regius chair provided the holder with a house in Cambridge, which Green sold. A medical history has noted that in his role as Regius professor Green did "little if any teaching". There were only three holders of the chair between 1700 and 1817, Green (1700–1741), Russell Plumptre (1741–1793), and Isaac Pennington (1793–1817), and the man of letters Christopher Wordsworth noted that their long duration in post "speaks well for their professional treatment of themselves".

Green's portrait is in the Hall of Caius' College, described as "Hogarth style".

John Martyn dedicated his The first Lecture of a Course of Botany, being an Introduction to the rest (1729) to Green.
