= John Hatcher (Cambridge) =

British physician and academic (d. 1587)

John Hatcher (died March 1587) was Regius professor of Physic at Cambridge University and its Vice-Chancellor.

== Biography ==
John Hatcher was a native of Surrey, probably from Croydon. He graduated B.A. from St. John’s College, Cambridge, in 1531–2, and was admitted a fellow on 31 March 1533. He commenced his M.A. in 1535, and was created M.D. in 1542. Subsequently, he was Regius professor of Physic. On 10 December 1545 he purchased the site of the dissolved house of the Augustinian ('Austin') friars in Cambridge. In 1557 he was a member of syndicates appointed to reform the composition for the election of proctors, and to revise the ancient statutes of the university. He acquired considerable wealth, and owned the manor of Careby, near Stamford in Lincolnshire, and an estate at Little Bytham. He was elected vice-chancellor for the year commencing 5 November 1579.

He married, first, Alice, daughter of Edward Green of London. They had at least four children: Thomas; Katherine, who married Thomas Lorkin, also Regius professor of Physic; Elizabeth, who married George Sherwood (their son John became Mayor of Cambridge); and Marie, who married John Lawghton. Alice was buried at St. Edward's on 9 March 1572/3. In 1582 John received a licence to marry the widowed Jane Trevell; he died at Austin Friars, and was buried there on 24 March 1586/7.

Academic offices
| Preceded by Thomas Bynge | Vice-Chancellor of the University of Cambridge; 1579–80 | Succeeded by Andrew Perne |
