= Thomas Lorkin =

English churchman, academic and physician

Thomas Lorkin (c. 1528–1591) was an English churchman, academic and physician, Regius Professor of Physic at Cambridge from 1564.

== Life ==
The son of Thomas Lorkin and Joan Huxley, he was born at Frindsbury in Kent about 1528. He matriculated at Pembroke Hall, Cambridge, 12 November 1549, graduated BA 1551–1552, proceeded MA 1555, and was created MD 1560. He was at first a fellow of Queens' College, then from 15 November 1554 till 1562 was fellow of Peterhouse.

On 21 April 1564 Lorkin was created Regius Professor of Physic; he was respondent in the physic act kept before the Queen in the same year, and in 1590 he obtained a grant of arms for the five Cambridge Regius professors. Among his medical students was Thomas Muffet. From 1572 till 1585 he was rector of Little Waltham in Essex.

Lorkin died 1 May 1591, and was buried in Great St Mary's Church, Cambridge, where there was an epitaph to him. He left by his will some estates in remainder to Pembroke Hall, Queens' College, and Peterhouse, and his books on physic to the university library. He had subscribed when young to the Roman Catholic articles, and in later years opposed Puritan preaching in the university.

== Works ==
Lorkin wrote Recta Regula et Victus ratio pro studiosis et literatis, London. His "Carmen Latinum decastichon" is prefixed to the manuscript Historia Anglicana by John Herd, among the Cotton manuscripts.

== Family ==
Lorkin married Catherine, daughter of John Hatcher, and left five daughters, one of whom married Edward Lively.

== Notes ==
Attribution

This article incorporates text from a publication now in the public domain: Lee, Sidney, ed. (1893). "Lorkin, Thomas". Dictionary of National Biography. Vol. 34. London: Smith, Elder & Co.
