= Inner Temple Library =

Private law library in London, England

Coordinates: 51.5131°N 0.1095°W

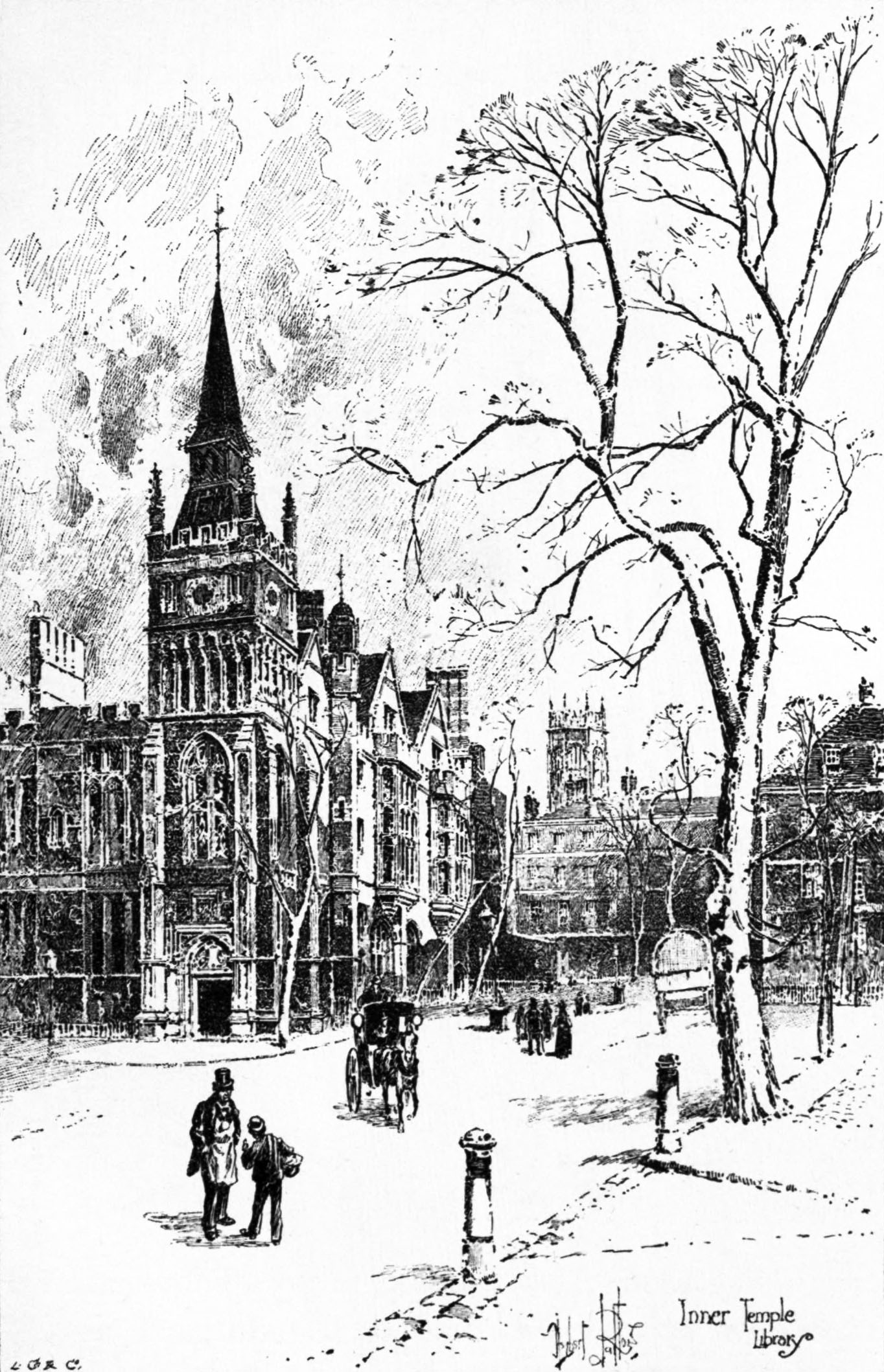
- The Inner Temple Library, c. 1895, Herbert Railton, illustrator
- Location: Inner Temple; London, EC4, England
- Type: Private
- Scope: Law
- Established: c. Henry VII era; original building in existence by 1506

Collection
- Size: Over 70,000 volumes of English law

Access and use
- Access requirements: Written application to the Librarian, to use material not available elsewhere
- Population served: Barristers, judges, and student members of the Inns of Court

Other information
- Director: Robert Hodgson (Librarian and Keeper of Manuscripts)
- Website: innertemplelibrary.org.uk

The Inner Temple Library is a private law library in the Inner Temple, London, serving barristers, judges, and students on the Bar Professional Training Course. Its parent body is the Honourable Society of the Inner Temple, one of the four Inns of Court.

Its law collections cover the legal systems of the British Isles (England and Wales, Scotland, Northern Ireland, the Republic of Ireland, the Channel Islands and the Isle of Man) and also Commonwealth countries. There are, in addition, extensive non-law collections covering such subjects as history, topography, biography and heraldry, and an important collection of legal and historical manuscripts.

== History ==
The Library is first mentioned in 1440, then in the Inn’s records in 1506. The Library refused to accept John Selden's manuscripts in 1654, most likely because the size of the collection would have necessitated a new building, but it has been described as "the greatest loss which the Library of the Inner Temple ever sustained". In 1707 the Inner Temple was offered the Petyt Manuscripts (William Petyt had been Keeper of the Records in the Tower, and a well-known writer of constitutional law) and a sum of £150 to build a new Library, which was completed in 1709 and consisted of three rooms. A Librarian was appointed immediately, and the practice continues to this day.

The library building before World War II was a Gothic building built in 1827-8 by Sir Robert Smirke, contained about 60,000 volumes. Modifications were made in 1867, 1872, and 1882 which extended the Library to eight rooms In 1886, J.E.L. Pickering, Librarian, read a paper at the Library Association monthly meeting on a 5-month trial at the Library, entitled "The Electric Light as Applied to the Lighting of the Inner Temple Law Library".

The building was destroyed during the Second World War: several thousand volumes of printed books (but none of the manuscripts) were lost. The destroyed books were mostly replaced, either by gift or purchase, over the next 30 years or so.

The present building was completed in 1958 to the design of T.W. Sutcliffe, with alterations made in 2019-2022, and is in the style of the eighteenth century. The library itself occupies the second floor, with private rooms of the benchers below and an auditorium and meeting rooms above.

The history of the Library is discussed in some detail in the introduction to J. Conway Davies's Catalogue of Manuscripts in the Library of the Honourable Society of the Inner Temple (Oxford, 1972).

== Admission ==
The Library is open to all members of the four Inns of Court. The Library is not open to the public, though non-members may be admitted, upon written application to the Librarian, to consult material not available elsewhere.
