= School of Clinical Medicine, University of Cambridge =

English medical school

Coordinates: 52.176°N 0.142°E

Cambridge University Medical School
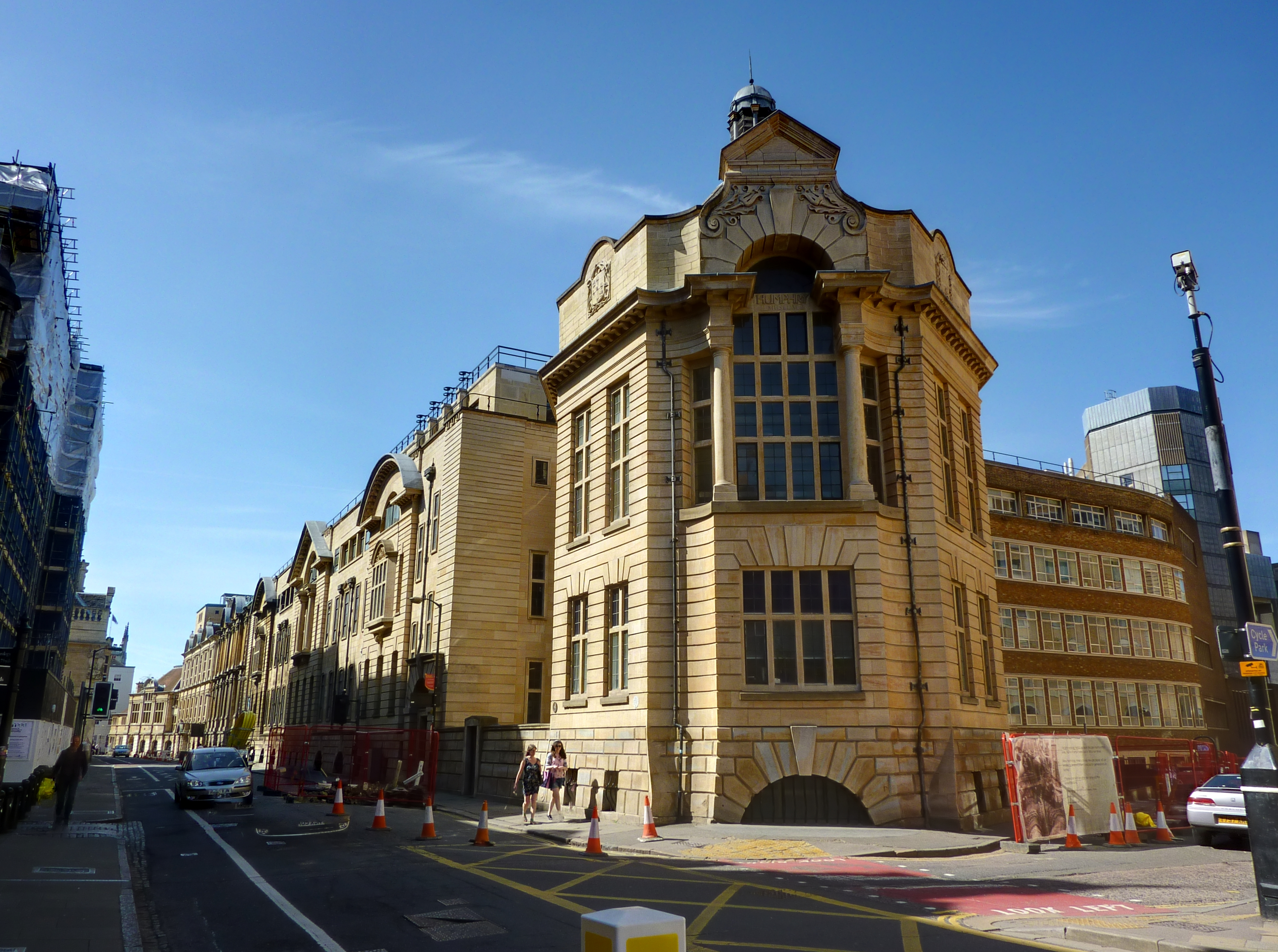
- Type: Medical school
- Established: 1540, re-established in 1976
- Parent institution: University of Cambridge
- Dean: Paul Wilkinson
- Students: ~270 per year (A100); ~40 per year (A101)
- Location: Cambridge, England
- Website: www.medschl.cam.ac.uk

The School of Clinical Medicine is the medical school of the University of Cambridge in England. The Cambridge Graduate Course in Medicine (A101) is the most competitive course offered by the university and in the UK, and is among the most competitive medical programmes for entry in the world. The school is located alongside Addenbrooke's Hospital and other institutions in multiple buildings across the Cambridge Biomedical Campus.

== The Clinical School ==
The Clinical School offers the A100 six-year standard course (accepting approximately 280 students each year) or the A101 accelerated graduate course (accepting approximately 40 students each year). Admission is extremely competitive, with the offered courses having among the lowest acceptance rates in the university. Around 10% of applicants were accepted to the A100 standard course for 2022 entry, with 22 places for overseas fee-status applicants. Around 3% of applicants were accepted to the A101 graduate course in 2023.

On the standard A100 course, students typically enter the clinical school on completion of three years of pre-clinical training. Approximately half of clinical training in Cambridge takes place at the Cambridge Biomedical Campus, with the other half located in regional hospitals and general practices across the east of England.

The accelerated A101 Graduate Entry Course leads to the award of MB BChir (Bachelor of Medicine and Bachelor of Surgery) in 4 years, with approximately 40 students in each cohort. This course is designed for those who already hold bachelor's degrees. This course has an intensive 2–year component with a mix of pre-clinical and clinical teaching, students attend the same lectures and practicals as 1st and 2nd year A100 students during the 8 week terms. They complete the Year 4 placements in the holidays and sit both the A100 2nd year and 4th year exams in the second year of their course. Then the cohort integrates with A100 students in their 5th year for the final two years of the course.

== Entry ==
The Clinical School was established in 1976 while construction of the new building at its present site was underway. The clinical course was restructured in 2005 with the addition of a new final year, as the clinical course had previously been less than three years in length. Before 2017, approximately half of medical students left Cambridge after the pre-clinical course as there were not enough places on the clinical course for them all; common destinations included medical schools based in Oxford, London and Manchester. From 2017, all medical students continue to study in Cambridge for the full six years provided they pass the pre-clinical component of the course.

Students enter the clinical course at Cambridge following satisfactory progression during the pre-clinical component of the combined medical course or as part of the graduate course.

== Departments ==
- Clinical Biochemistry
- Clinical Neurosciences
  - Cambridge Centre for Brain Repair
  - Neurology Unit
  - Neurosurgery
  - Wolfson Brain Imaging Centre
- Haematology
  - Transfusion Medicine
  - Diagnostics Development Unit
- Genomic Medicine
- Medicine
  - Anaesthesia
  - Clinical Pharmacology
- Obstetrics and Gynaecology
- Oncology
- Paediatrics
- Psychiatry
  - Brain Mapping Unit
  - Developmental Psychiatry
- Public Health and Primary Care
  - The Primary Care Unit
  - Clinical Gerontology
- Radiology
- Surgery
  - Orthopaedic Research

== Institutes ==
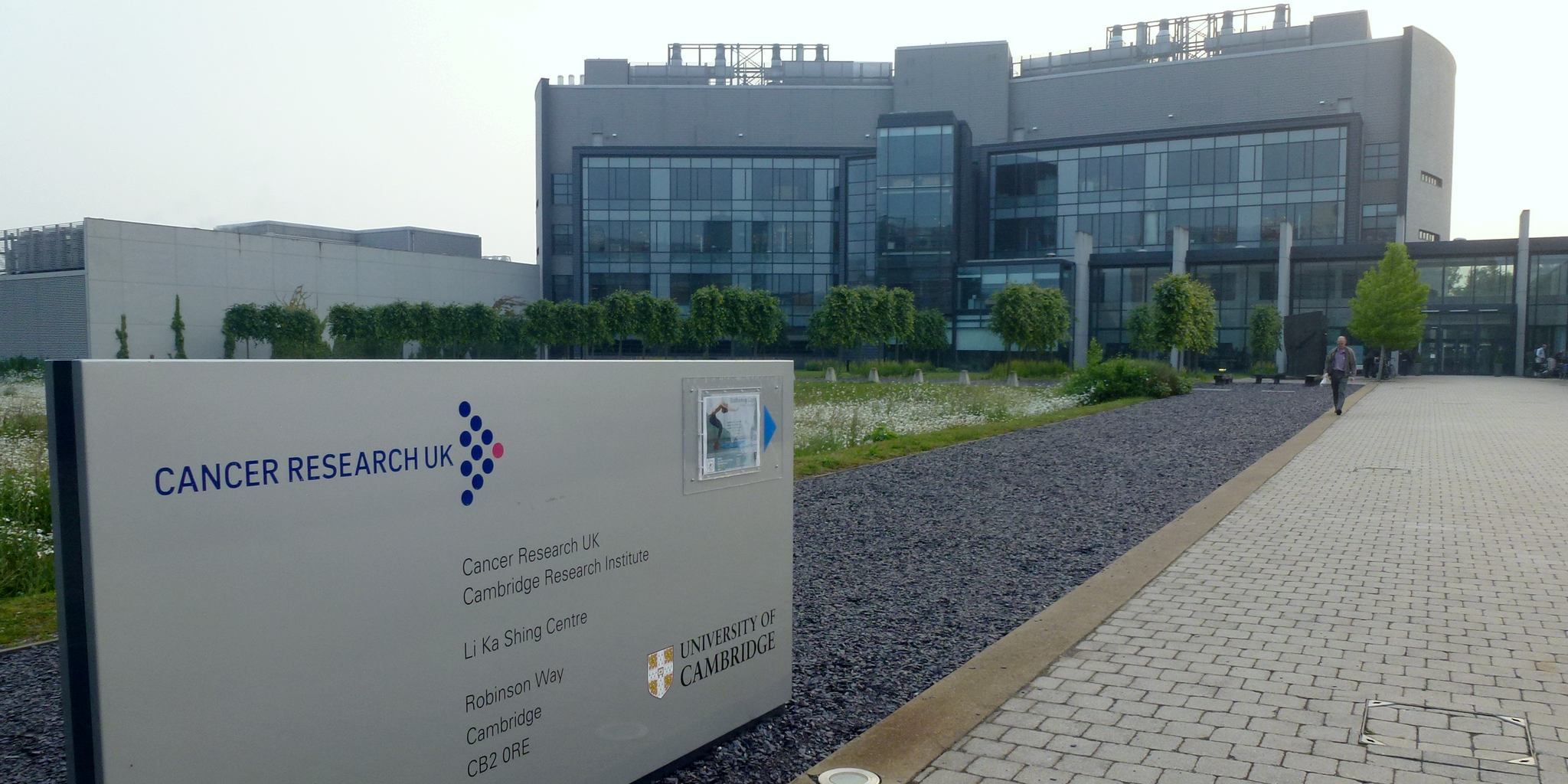
Li Ka Shing Centre of the Cancer Research UK Cambridge Institute

- MRC Cancer Unit
- Institute of Metabolic Science (IMS-MRL)
- Cambridge Institute for Medical Research (CIMR)
- Institute of Public Health
- Cancer Research UK Cambridge Institute
- MRC Mitochondrial Biology Unit

=== Herchel Smith Laboratory for Medicinal Chemistry ===
The Herchel Smith Laboratory for Medicinal Chemistry is a laboratory under the aegis of the Regius Professor of Physic in the School of Clinical Medicine.

== Notable people ==
The teaching of medicine at the University of Cambridge dates back to 1540 when Henry VIII endowed the University’s first Professorship of Physic, Dr John Blyth. In 1842, George Paget, the famous physician, into his third year at Addenbrooke’s Hospital, pioneered bedside examinations.

- Patrick Maxwell, Regius Professorship of Physic
- Kay-Tee Khaw, Professor of Clinical Gerontology
- Ieuan Hughes, Professor Emeritus of Paediatrics

== See also ==
- Cambridge Biomedical Campus
- Addenbrooke's Hospital
