= Isaac Penington =

Isaac Penington (or Pennington) may refer to:

- Isaac Penington (Lord Mayor) (1584–1661), Lord Mayor of London
- Isaac Penington (Quaker) (1616–1679), early Quaker, son of Isaac Penington above
- Isaac Pennington (1745–1817), British physician
