= Passions of the Soul =

1649 book by René Descartes

In his final philosophical treatise, The Passions of the Soul (French: Les Passions de l'âme), completed in 1649 and dedicated to Princess Elisabeth of Bohemia, the French philosopher and mathematician René Descartes contributes to a long tradition of philosophical inquiry into the nature of "the passions". The passions were experiences – now commonly called emotions in the modern period – that had been a subject of debate among philosophers and theologians since the time of Plato.

Notable precursors to Descartes who articulated their own theories of the passions include Augustine of Hippo, Thomas Aquinas and Thomas Hobbes. According to Amélie Rorty, the work reflects Descartes's need to reconcile the influence of the passions on otherwise rational beings. This marks a clear point in the advancement of human self-estimation, paralleling the increasingly rational-based scientific method. Descartes affirmed that the passions "are all intrinsically good, and that all we have to avoid is their misuse or their excess" (art. 211).

== Origins and organization of the text ==
=== Origins of the book ===
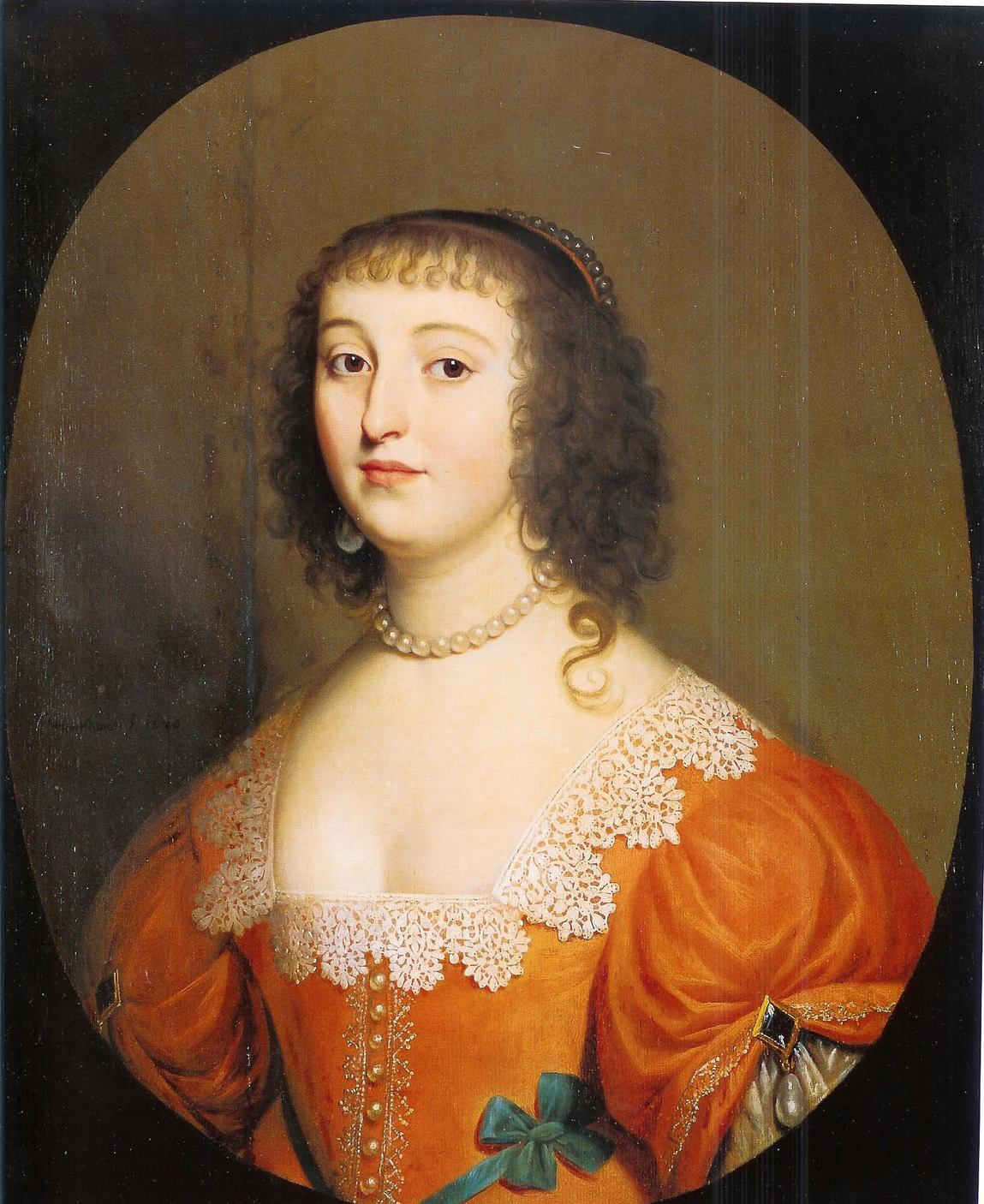
Elisabeth of Bohemia (1636)

In 1643 Descartes began a prolific written correspondence with Princess Elisabeth of Bohemia, in which he answered her moral questions, especially the nature of happiness, passions, and ethics. Passions of the Soul was written as a synthesis of this exchange.

Amélie Rorty asserts that the examination of the passions present in Descartes's work plays a significant role in illustrating the development of the perception of the cognitive mind in Western culture. According to her article "From Passions to Emotions and Sentiments", Descartes's need to reconcile the influence of the passions on otherwise rational beings marks a clear point in the advancement of human self-estimation, paralleling the increasingly rational-based scientific method.

==== Relationship between moral philosophy and science ====
In the context of the development of scientific thought in the seventeenth century which was abandoning the idea of the cosmos in favor of an open universe guided by inviolable laws of nature (see Alexandre Koyré), human actions no longer depended on understanding the order and mechanism of the universe (as had been the philosophy of the Greeks), but instead on understanding the essential workings of nature.

It was only in this context that Descartes wished to speak of the passions, neither as a moralist nor from a psychological perspective, but as a method of exploring a fundamental aspect of natural science. "My design is not to explain the passions as an Orator", he wrote in a letter to his editor dated August 14, 1649, "nor even as a Philosopher, but only as a Physicist." In doing so, Descartes broke not only from the Aristotelian tradition (according to which the movements of the body originate in the soul), but also the Stoic and Christian traditions which defined the passions as the illnesses of the soul and which dictate that they be treated as such. Descartes thus affirmed that the passions "are all intrinsically good, and that all we have to avoid is their misuse or their excess" (art. 211).

In the context of the mechanistic view of life which was gaining popularity in seventeenth century science, Descartes perceived the body as an autonomous machine, capable of moving independently of the soul. It was from this physiological perception of the body that Descartes developed his theories on the passions of the soul. Formerly considered to be an anomaly, the passions became a natural phenomenon, necessitating a scientific explanation.

==== The notion of passion ====
The treatise is based on the philosophy developed by Descartes in his previous works, especially the distinction between the body and the soul: the soul thinks (res cogitans) but is incorporeal, while the body is physical (res extensa) but does not think and is primarily defined by its form and movement. This is what is known as Cartesian dualism. In Passions, Descartes further explores this mysterious dichotomy of mind and body.

The passions such as Descartes understood them correspond roughly to the sentiments now called emotions, but there exist several important distinctions between the two. The principle of these is that passions, as is suggested by the word's etymology, are by nature suffered and endured, and are therefore the result of an external cause acting upon a subject. In contrast, modern psychology considers emotions to be a sensation which occurs inside a subject and therefore is produced by the subject themselves.

In Passions of the Soul, Descartes defines the passions as "the perceptions, sensations, or commotions of the soul which we relate particularly to the soul and are caused, maintained, and strengthened by some movement of the spirits" (art. 27). The "spirits" mentioned in this definition are "animal spirits", a notion central to understanding Descartes's physiology. These spirits function in a capacity similar to modern medicine's nervous system. Descartes explains that these animal spirits are produced in the blood and are responsible for the physical stimulation which causes the body to move. In affecting the muscles, for example, the animal spirits "move the body in all the different ways it is capable of" (Passions of the Soul art. 10).

Descartes does not reject the passions in principle; instead, he underlines their beneficial role in human existence. He maintains that humans should work to better understand their function in order to control them rather than be controlled by them. Thus, "[e]ven those who have the weakest souls could acquire absolute mastery over all their passions if they worked hard enough at training and guiding them" (art. 50).

=== Organization of the treatise ===
The organization of Descartes's Passions is indicative of the author's philosophy. Applying his famous method to moral philosophy, Descartes represented the problem of the passions of the soul in terms of its simplest integral components. He distinguishes between six fundamentally distinct passions:

But there aren't many simple and basic passions ... you'll easily see that there are only six: wonder, love, hatred, desire, joy, sadness. All the others are either composed from some of these six or they are species of them. So I'll help you to find your way through the great multitude of passions by treating the six basic ones separately, and then showing how all the others stem from them.

— Descartes, Passions of the Soul, article 69

It is with these six primary passions (wonder, love, hate, desire, joy, and sadness) that Descartes begins his investigation on their physiological effects and their influence on human behavior. He then follows by combining the six passions to create a holistic picture of the passions.

The work is itself divided into three parts, titled:

1. The Passions in General and incidentally the whole nature of man;
2. The Number and Order of the Passions and explanations of the six basic passions;
3. Specific Passions.

The work is further divided, within the three greater parts, into 212 short articles which rarely exceed a few paragraphs in length.

== Philosophical problems ==
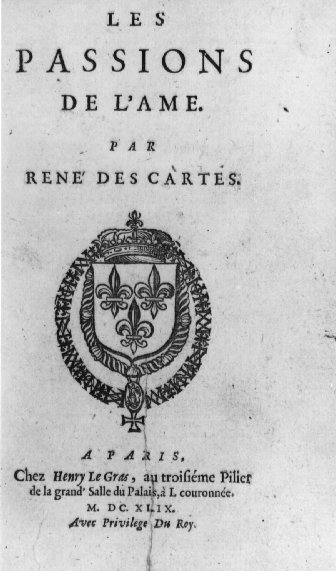
Title page of the Passions.

=== Status of the subject ===
According to Michel Meyer, Passions is one of the most important of Descartes's published works. Descartes wrote the treatise in response to an acute philosophical anxiety, and yet in doing so, he risked destroying the entirety of his previous work and the Cartesian system.

The problem arises from the fact that the passions, inextricably based in human nature, threaten the supremacy of the thinking subject on which Descartes based his philosophical system, notably in Discourse on the Method. Descartes had made the thinking subject the foundation of objective certainty in his famous statement, "I think, therefore I am". It was on this system that he based the possibility of knowing and understanding the world. In allowing that the passions could disrupt the process of reasoning within a human, he allowed for an inherent flaw in this proof – and if man was forced to doubt the truth of his own perceptions, on what could he base his understanding of the natural world?

Additionally, a further distinction between Descartes's writings on physics and those on human nature such as can be found in Passions is their relationship to Aristotelian teleology. While Descartes argues against the existence of a final cause in physics, the nature of his work on examining the origins and functions of desires in the human soul necessitates the existence of a final goal towards which the individual is working.

=== The relationship between the body and the spirit ===
The problem of the Passions treatise is also the problem of Cartesian dualism. In the first part of his work, Descartes ponders the relationship between the thinking substance and the body. For Descartes, the only link between these two substances is the pineal gland (art. 31), the place where the soul is attached to the body.

The passions that Descartes studies are in reality the actions of the body on the soul (art. 25). The soul suffers the influence of the body and is entirely subject to the influence of the passions. In the manner by which Descartes explains the human body, the animal spirits stimulate the pineal gland and cause many troubles (or strong emotions) in the soul.

== The combination of the passions ==
The passions attack the soul and force the body to commit inappropriate actions. It was therefore necessary for Descartes to study in the second part of his treatise the particular effects of each separate passion and its manners of manifestation. The study of the passions permits one to better understand and account for these elements which may otherwise disturb a human's rational reasoning capabilities.

At the same time, Descartes's modernity must also be appreciated. Even while outlining the passions and their effect, he never issues an overarching interdiction against them as fatal human defects to be avoided at all costs. He recognizes them as an inherent aspect of humanity, not to be taken as aberrations. Furthermore, the role of the passions on the body is not insignificant. Descartes indicates that they must be harnessed in order to learn which are good and bad for the body, and therefore for the individual (art. 211 and 212).

Thus the majority of the work is devoted to enumerating the passions and their effects. He begins with the six basic passions and then touches on the specific passions which stem from their combination. For example, contempt and esteem are two of the passions derived from the basic passion of admiration (art. 150). The passion which Descartes valued the most is generosity for the positive effect it has on the individual (art. 153).

== Controlling the passions ==
For Descartes, nothing could be more damaging to the soul and therefore the thought-process, which is its primary function (art. 17), than the body (art. 2). He maintained that the passions are not harmful in and of themselves. To protect the independence of the thoughts and guarantee a man's understanding of reality, however, he indicated that it is necessary to know the passions, and learn to control them in order to put them to the best possible use. It is also necessary, therefore, that a man strive to master the separation which exists between the corporeal body and the mind.

== The influence of The Passions of the Soul ==
In her examination of the popular modern misconceptions of Descartes's philosophy, Lilli Alanen argues that Gilbert Ryle, author of The Concept of Mind (1949), is commonly associated with a modern-day application of Descartes's philosophy as put forth in Passions. According to Alanen, Ryle describes the true man as the "ghost in the machine", completely separating the physical body and from the metaphysical "mind" which actually encapsulates the spirit as well. Alanen argues that this philosophy is more akin to that of Plato's, while Descartes's remains more closely tied to Aristotle. The confusion which ties Ryle so closely to Descartes arises from a confusing mix of metaphors; Descartes and his contemporaries conceptualized of the mind as a thing of physical (if inconceivable) proportions, which allowed for a differentiation between "inner" and "outer" sense. This ties back to Descartes's Discourse, which derived knowledge and understanding of external realities on the basis of internal certainty.

== See also ==
- Passions (philosophy)
- Balloonist theory
- Discourse on the Method
- Mind–body problem
- Implicit cognition
- Principles of Philosophy
