= James Tyldesley Kendall =

American chemist and research physicist

Dr James Tyldesley Kendall FRSE FIP FRIC (14 December 1916 – 31 July 1991) was a 20th-century American chemist and research physicist of Scots descent.

== Life ==
He was born in New York City on 14 December 1916 the son of Alice Tyldesley and her husband, James Pickering Kendall. In 1928 he returned to Scotland with his English born parents when his father took a role at the University of Edinburgh. He was then educated at Edinburgh Academy 1929 to 1935.

He won a place at the University of Cambridge and graduated first with a BA then an MA (1944) (disrupted by the Second World War). He began to specialise in research and obtained a doctorate (PhD) from the University of London in 1953.

In 1951 he was elected a Fellow of the Royal Society of Edinburgh. His proposers were Mowbray Ritchie, Ronald Arnold, Max Born and Sir Edmund Whittaker.

In 1966 he returned to the United States to work for the National Cash Register Corporation, rising to be head of technical staff in 1981.

He retired in 1983. He died on 31 July 1991.

== Publications ==
- Electronic Conduction in Homopolar Crystals (1954)

== Family ==
In 1950 he married Rosemary Mundy-Castle.
