= Hans Friedrich Gadow =

German zoologist and ornithologist (1855–1928)

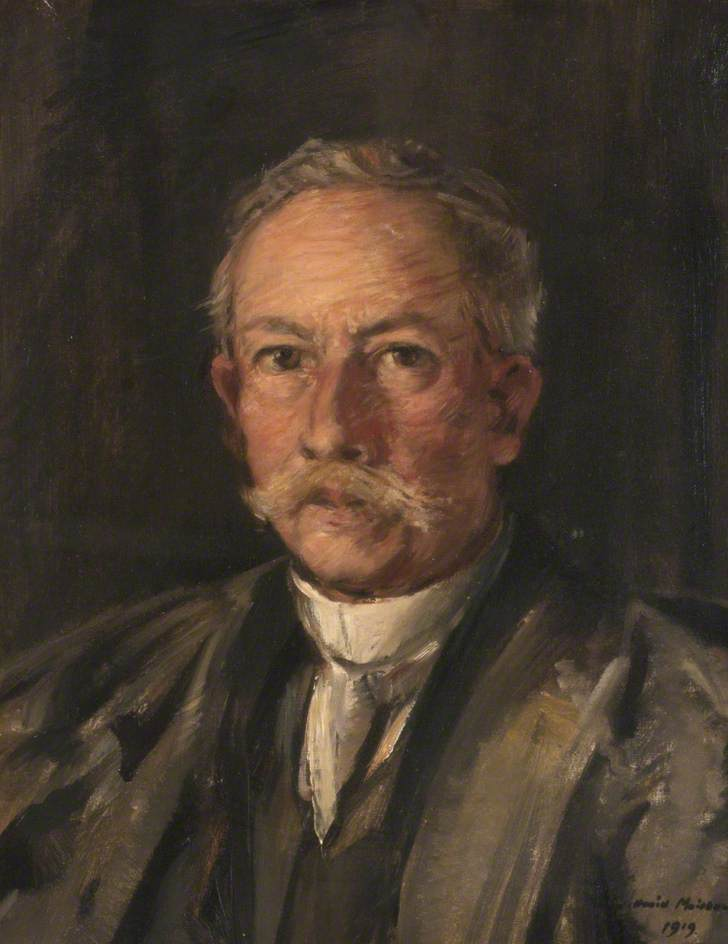
Portrait by David Muirhead (1919)

Hans Friedrich Gadow (8 March 1855 – 16 May 1928) was a German-born ornithologist who worked in Britain. His work on the classification of birds based on anatomical and morphological characters was influential and made use of by Alexander Wetmore in his classification of North American birds.

Gadow was born in Stary Kraków (Pomerania), the son of an inspector of the Prussian royal forests. He studied at the universities of Berlin, Jena and Heidelberg. At Jena he studied under Ernst Haeckel and at Heidelberg University under the anatomist Carl Gegenbaur. After graduation he travelled to the Natural History Museum in London in 1880 at the request of Albert Günther, to work on the museum's Catalogue of Birds. Gadow also established the first new sequence of bird orders and families that departed from earlier works in being based on phylogenetic principles based on a comparison of anatomical and morphological features and made use of the studies made by Max Fürbringer. This sequence was continued with modification by Alexander Wetmore and James L. Peters and followed from the 1930s to the 1960s. Gadow prepared Volume VIII on the titmice, shrikes and nuthatches, and Volume IX on the sunbirds and honeyeaters.

In 1884 Gadow succeeded Osbert Salvin as Curator of the Strickland Collection at Cambridge University, as well as being appointed Lecturer on the Morphology of Vertebrates. He became a member of the British Ornithologists' Union in 1881 and a fellow of the Royal Society in 1892. He became a naturalized British citizen in 1882. He married Clara Maud Paget, daughter of Sir George E. Paget.

In 1895 and 1896 Gadow and his wife made two journeys along northern Spain, from the Basque Country to Galicia. In 1897 Gadow published In Northern Spain, the book that gathered together the very interesting observations on geography, ethnography, and fauna and flora he had made.

Gadow's publications included Classification of the Vertebrata (1898), a translation of Haeckel's work entitled The Last Link (1898) and the articles on anatomy in Alfred Newton's Dictionary of Birds.

Gadow is commemorated in the scientific names of three species of Mexican lizards: Abronia gadovii, Anolis gadovii, and Urosaurus gadovi. His wife Clara Maud Gadow (née Paget) is commemorated in the scientific name of one species of Mexican lizard, Sceloporus gadoviae.
