= Regius Professor of Physic (Cambridge) =

Professorship at the University of Cambridge

The Regius Professorship of Physic is one of the oldest professorships at the University of Cambridge, founded by Henry VIII in 1540. "Physic" is an old word for medicine (and the root of the word 'physician'): it does not refer to the study of physics. The Regius Professor of Physic is ex officio head of the School of Clinical Medicine at the university.

== Regius Professors of Physic ==
1. John Blyth (1540)
2. John Hatcher (1554)
3. Henry Walker (1555)
4. Thomas Lorkin (1564)
5. William Ward (1591)
6. William Burton (1596)
7. John Gostlin (1623)
8. John Collins (1626)
9. Ralph Winterton (1635)
10. Francis Glisson (1636)
11. Robert Brady (1677)
12. Christopher Green (1700–1741)
13. Russell Plumptre (1741–1793)
14. Sir Isaac Pennington (1793–1817)
15. John Haviland (1817)
16. Henry Bond (1851)
17. Sir George Paget (1872)
18. Sir Clifford Allbutt (1892)
19. Sir Humphry Rolleston, Bt (1925)
20. Sir Walter Langdon-Brown (1932)
21. John Ryle (1935–1943)
22. Sir Lionel Whitby (1945–1956)
23. J. S. Mitchell (1957)
24. Sir John Butterfield (1975)
25. Sir Keith Peters (1987)
26. Sir Patrick Sissons (2005)
27. Patrick Maxwell (2012)

== Official coat of arms ==
According to a grant of 1590, the office of Regius Professor of "Physic" at Cambridge has a coat of arms with the following blazon:

Coat of arms of Regius Professor of Physic
Crest On a wreath or and azure, a quinquangle silver, called "simbolum sanitatis." Escutcheon Azure, a fesse ermines between three lozenges or, on a chief gules a lion passant guardant of the third, charged on the side with the letter M sable.
