= Patrick Maxwell (British physician) =

British physician

Patrick H. Maxwell CBE FMedSci
- Awards: Goulstonian Lecture

Patrick Henry Maxwell is a British physician and the Regius Professor of Physic at the University of Cambridge, a position he has held since 2012. His research focuses regulation of gene expression by changes in oxygen.

Maxwell studied for a DPhil in Medicine at Corpus Christi College, Oxford. He undertook postgraduate clinical and research training in nephrology and general medicine at Guy's Hospital and in Oxford.

In the 2024 Birthday Honours, Maxwell was appointed a Commander of the Order of the British Empire (CBE) for services to medical research. He was elected a Fellow of the Academy of Medical Sciences in 2005.
