= Wheatacre =

Civil parish in Norfolk, England

Coordinates: 52.486779°N 1.624689°E

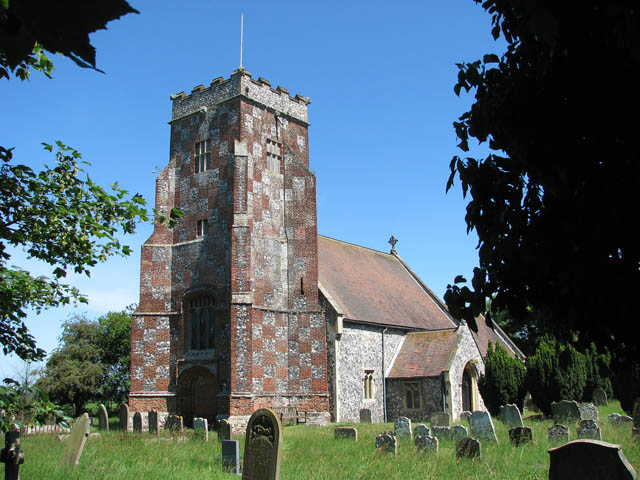
- All Saints Church, Wheatacre

- Location within Norfolk
- Area: 4.38 km^{2} (1.69 sq mi)
- Population: 118 (2011)
  - Density: 27/km^{2} (70/sq mi)
- OS grid reference: TM461938
- Civil parish: Wheatacre
- District: South Norfolk
- Shire county: Norfolk
- Region: East
- Country: England
- Sovereign state: United Kingdom
- Post town: BECCLES
- Postcode district: NR34
- Dialling code: 01502
- Police: Norfolk
- Fire: Norfolk
- Ambulance: East of England

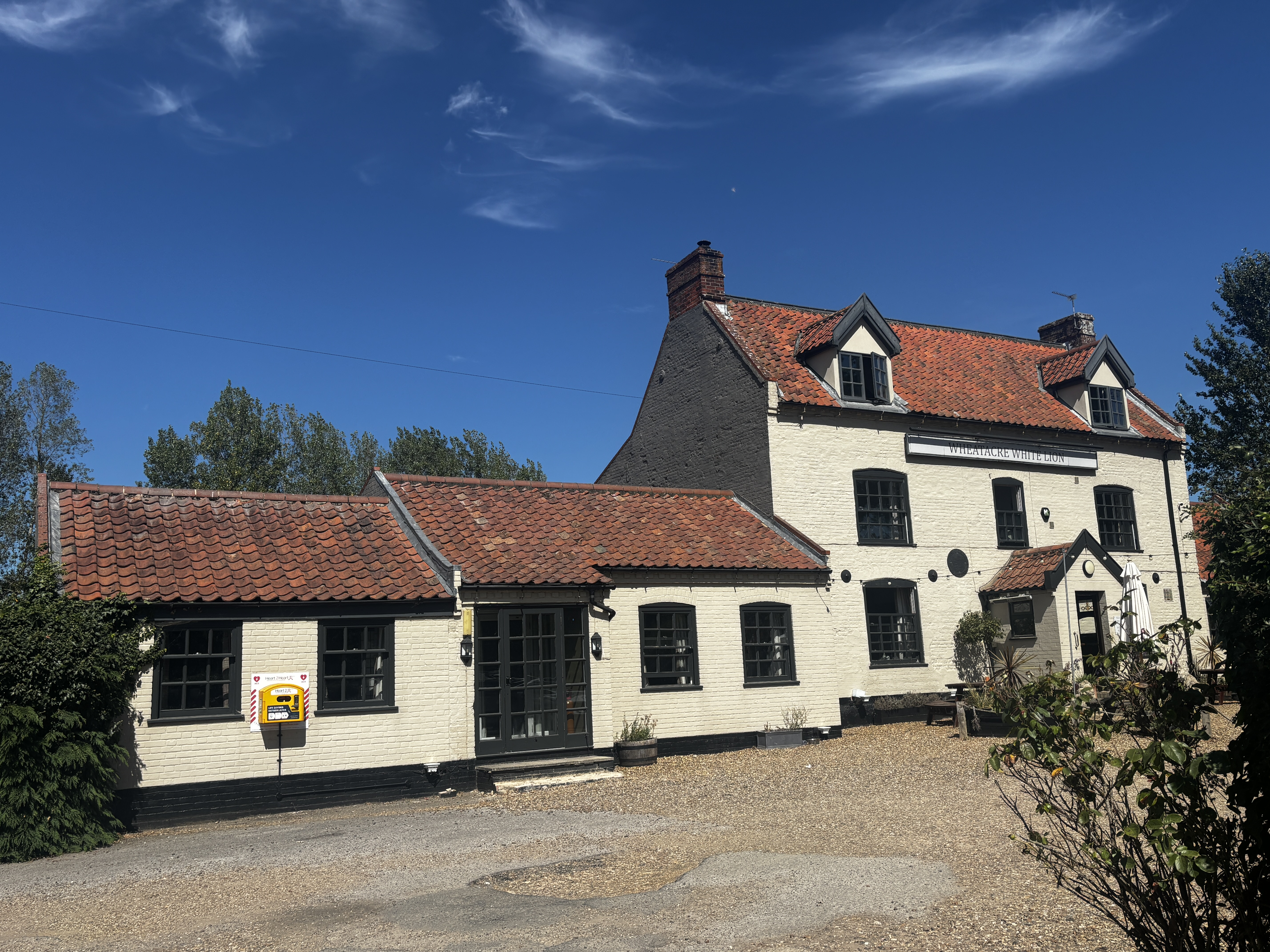
Wheatacre White Lion

Wheatacre is a civil parish in the English county of Norfolk. It covers an area of 4.38 km^{2} (1.69 sq mi) and had a population of 112 in 43 households at the 2001 census, increasing to 118 at the 2011 Census . and 125 residents at the 2021 Census. For the purposes of local government, it falls within the district of South Norfolk

The village's name means 'Wheat land'. In the Domesday Book of 1086 Wheatacre is recorded as a highly significant medieval settlement within the hundred of Clavering in Norfolk. The settlement was rich in livestock and arable lands.

Despite its small size Wheatacre offers a surprising strong set of rural amenities. The Farmhouse Kitchen at Wheatacre Hall is a newly converted countryside cafe and restaurant. The Wheatacre White Lion is a traditional country pub and restaurant with a campsite and bed and breakfast rooms which also hosts community events. The Farmhouse Pantry, at Wheatacre Hall Barns, open 7 days a week, a fully stocked shop with everyday and local luxury produce. Wheatacre Hall Barns is a complex of luxury, self catering holiday barns on a working dairy farm.

Wheatacre All Saints Church, parish church located on Church Road it features a distinctive square tower and serves as the primary anchor for local services.

== See also ==
- Clavering hundred
