= William Petyt =

English barrister and writer

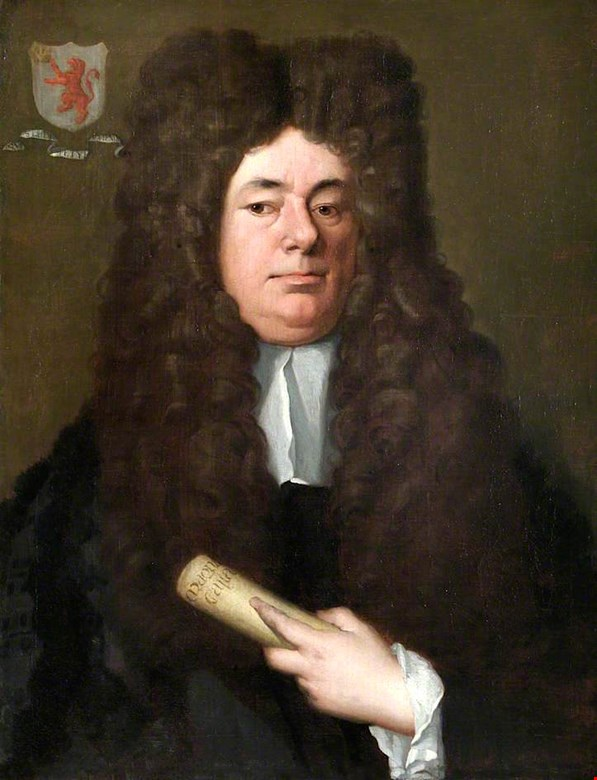
William Petyt Holding a Copy of Magna Carta (c. 1690) by Richard van Bleeck, in the collection of the Tower of London

William Petyt (or Petit) (1640/1641 – 3 October 1707) was an English barrister and writer, and a political propagandist in the Whig interest.

== Life ==
Petyt was born in 1640 or 1641 in the village of Storiths, near Bolton Abbey, Skipton, Yorkshire, and educated at the Free Grammar School (now Ermysted's Grammar School), Skipton, and Christ's College, Cambridge. He was admitted as a barrister to the Middle Temple in June 1660, and to Barnard's Inn in June 1661. He was specially admitted to the Inner Temple on 25 November 1664, and subsequently called to the Bar there in February 1671 and made a bencher in 1689. He served as Treasurer (that is, the head) of Inner Temple in 1701–1702.

On 25 July 1689, Petyt was appointed Keeper of the records at the Tower of London by William III, replacing in that position Robert Brady who had made a very effective attack for the Tories on Petyt's The Antient Right of the Commons of England Asserted (1680). Petyt was attacked also from his own side, the Whigs, by Thomas Hunt.

Petyt wrote against the separation of powers, and in favour of Parliament's control of the judiciary. Influential in its time, in particular on John Locke, was a version of "ancient constitutionalism" propounded in the writings of John Sadler, James Tyrrell and Petyt.

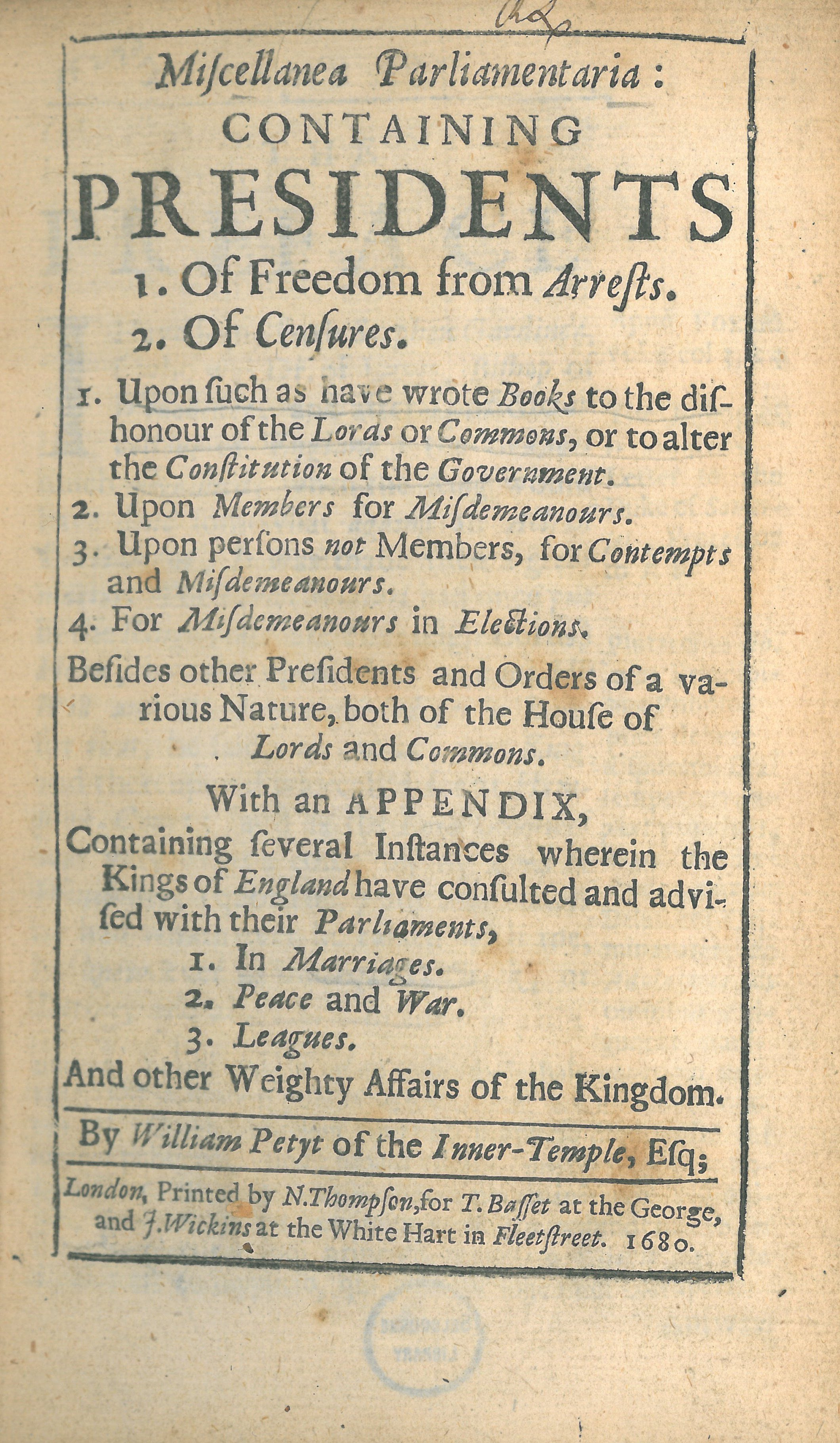
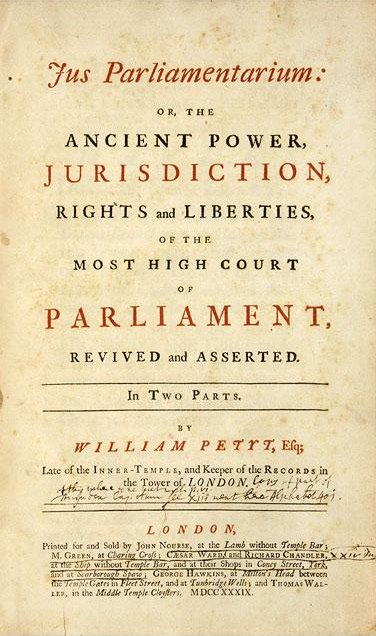
The title pages of Petyt's Miscellanea Parliamentaria (1st ed., 1680) (left), and Jus parliamentarium (1st ed., 1739) (right)

Petyt died unmarried in Chelsea, London, on 3 October 1707, and was buried in the west part of Temple Church. In his will he left £50 to the Free Grammar School in Skipton which was used to purchase books for needy students. He also left £200 for the maintenance of alumni of the Free Grammar School who had been admitted as scholars at Christ's College, Cambridge. In addition, he entrusted to his trustees his books and manuscripts together with £150 for buying or building a place to preserve them. Inner Temple Library was enlarged for this purpose, and in 1708 Petyt's trustees deposited his collection there, except for about 2,000 items which his brother Sylvester (1640–1719) took to his home in Yorkshire. Sylvester, who also attended the Free Grammar School, eventually bequeathed to the school the generous sum of £30,000 to form the Petyt Trust, and also books belonging to himself, his brother and friends which became the Petyt Library.

== Legacy ==
Modern verdicts on Petyt as a historian have been harsh. David C. Douglas comments that he and William Atwood, though distinguished jurists, "took what was worst" from the earlier works of their century on constitutional history. J. H. Plumb wrote that it was hard not convict Petyt, "not only of error, but also of deceit".

== Works ==
- The Antient Right of the Commons of England Asserted (1680)
- Miscellanea Parliamentaria (1680)
- Britannia languens (1680)
- The Pillars of Parliament (1681)
- Jus Parliamentarium (1739)
