= Isaac Pennington =

English physician

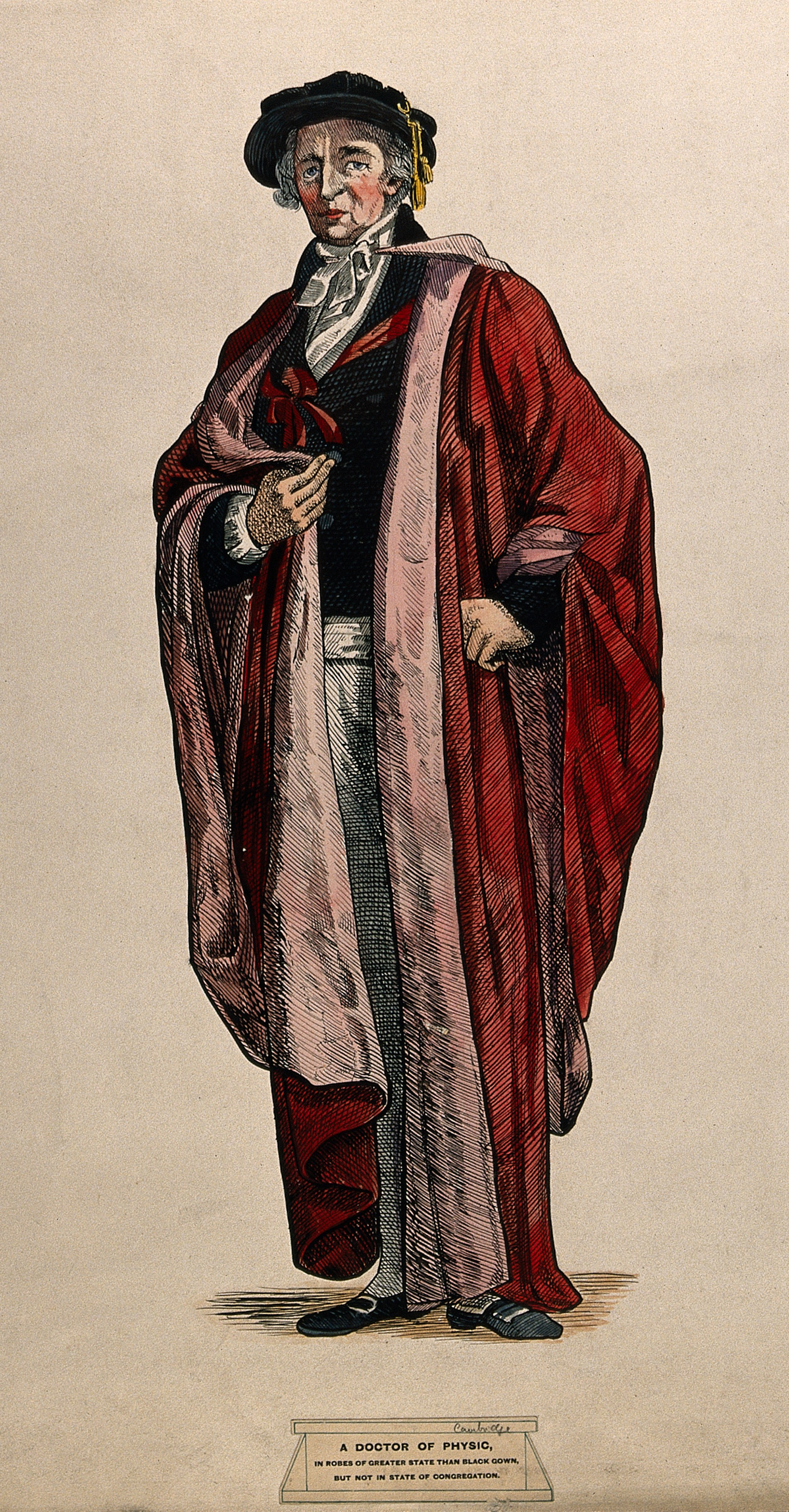
Sir Isaac in his ceremonial robes. Credit: Wellcome Library

See Isaac Penington (disambiguation) for other people with a similar name.

Sir Isaac Pennington (1745–1817) was an English physician, of whom there are two portraits in the National Portrait Gallery.

Isaac Pennington was educated at Sedbergh School and St John's College, Cambridge. From 1773 to 1817 he was physician to Addenbrooke's Hospital in Cambridge and from 1793 to 1817 Regius Professor of Physic at Cambridge University.
