= Mowbray Ritchie =

Scottish chemist and scientific author (1905–1966)

Mowbray Ritchie FRSE (5 October 1905 – 2 September 1966) was a 20th-century Scottish chemist and scientific author. He was a friend and colleague of Sir Edmund Hirst.

== Life ==
Ritchie was born in Peebles on 5 October 1905, and was educated at Peebles High School. He studied chemistry at the University of Edinburgh graduating with a BSc in 1927. He then continued as a postgraduate gaining two doctorates (PhD and DSc). In 1932 Ritchie began working as a demonstrator at University chemistry lectures, and was promoted to lecturer in 1935.

In 1937 he was elected a Fellow of the Royal Society of Edinburgh. His proposers were James Pickering Kendall, John Edwin MacKenzie, Ernest Bowman Ludlam, and Thomas Robert Bolam. He served as vice president to the Society from 1963 until 1966, and won the Society's Makdougall-Brisbane Prize for the period 1946–48.

He died in Edinburgh on 2 September 1966, aged 60.

== Publications ==
- Thermal Decomposition of Ozone (1935)
- Chemical Kinetics in Homogenous Systems (1966)
