= Francis Glisson =

British doctor

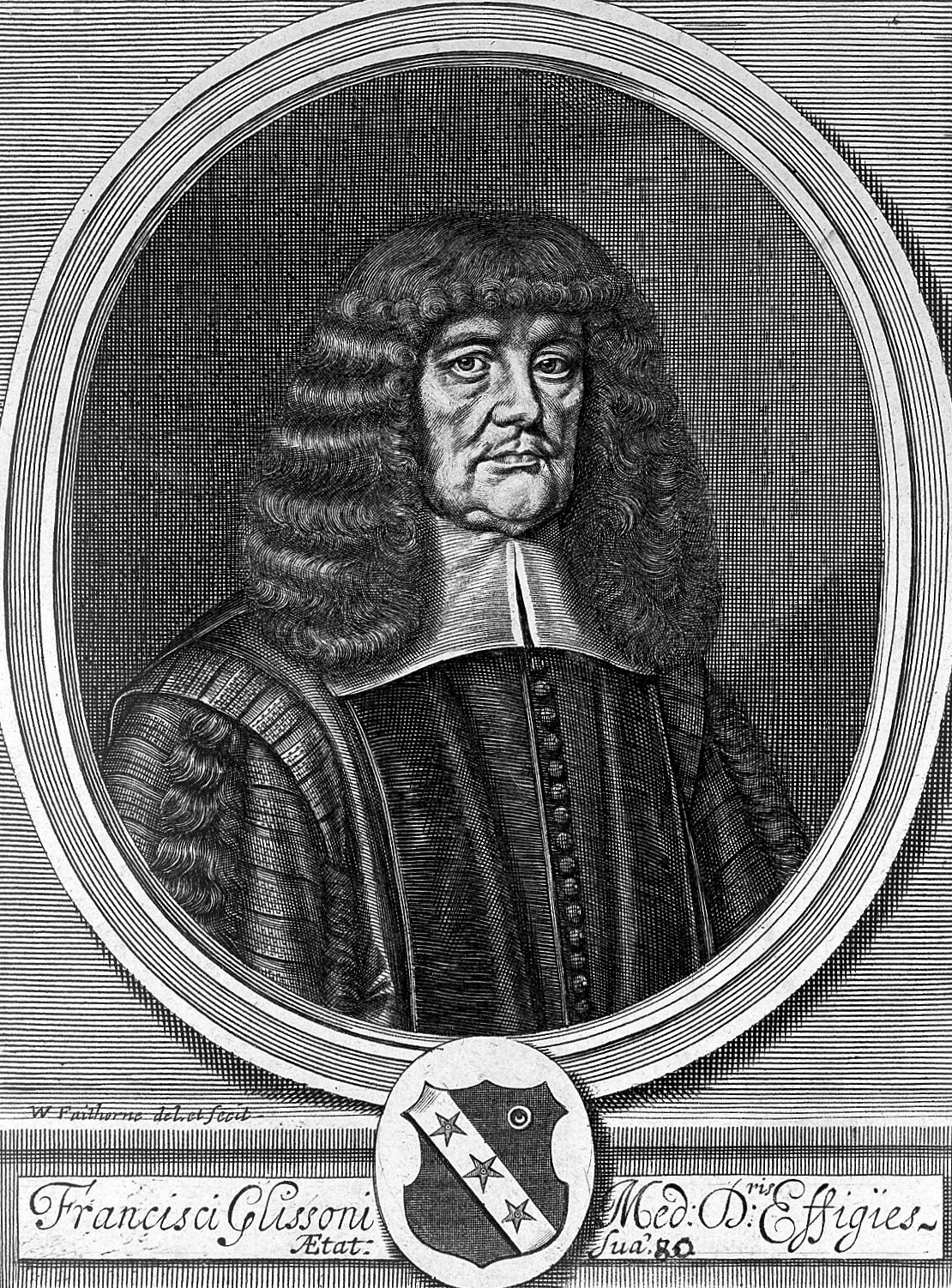
- Francis Glisson
- Born: 1597; Bristol, England
- Died: 14 October 1677 (aged 79–80); London, England
- Known for: Fibrous capsule of Glisson
- Scientific career
- Fields: Physician

Francis Glisson (1597 – 14 October 1677) was an English physician, anatomist, and writer on medical subjects. He did important work on the anatomy of the liver, and he wrote an early pediatric text on rickets. An experiment he performed helped debunk the balloonist theory of muscle contraction by showing that when a muscle contracted under water, the water level did not rise, and thus no air or fluid could be entering the muscle.

Glisson was born in Bristol and was educated in Rampisham, Dorset, and at Gonville and Caius College, Cambridge. Glisson is a well-known medical eponym; he was for forty years Regius Professor of Physic at Cambridge. He spent his later years in Covent Garden and died in London. The Glisson family can be traced to present-day Somerset.

== See also ==
- Fibrous capsule of Glisson
