= George Edward Paget =

English physician and academic (1809–1892)

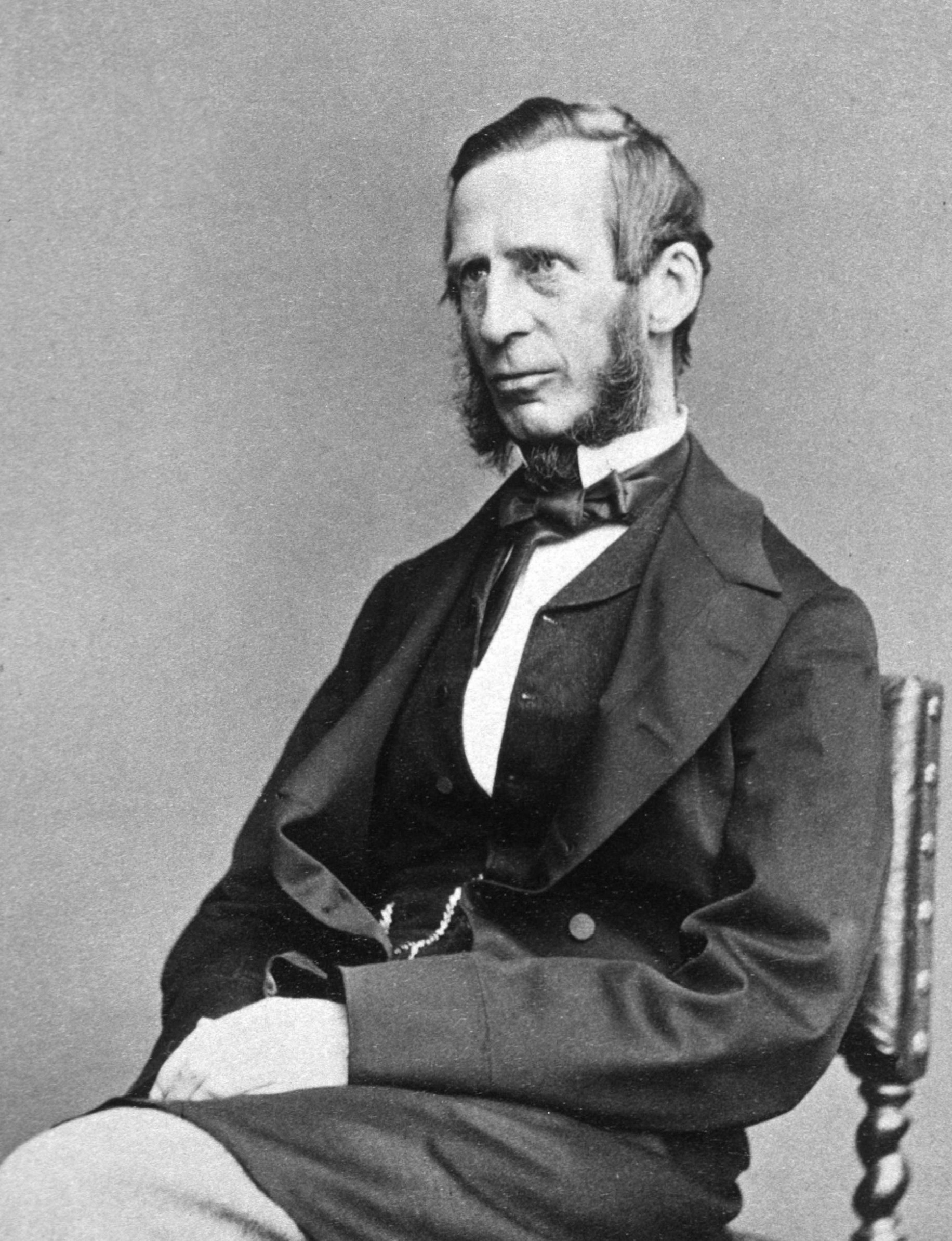
George Edward Paget

Sir George Edward Paget, KCB, FRS (22 December 1809 – 16 January 1892) was an English physician and academic.

== Life ==
The seventh son of Samuel Paget and his wife, Sarah Elizabeth Tolver, he was born at Great Yarmouth, Norfolk. After schooling there, he was sent to Charterhouse School in 1824, and in addition to regular lessons, which were then, under John Russell wholly classical, he studied mathematics. He entered Gonville and Caius College, Cambridge, in October 1827, and graduated in 1831 as eighth wrangler.

In 1832 Paget was elected to a physic fellowship in his college, and began the study of medicine. He entered St. Bartholomew's Hospital, and, after time in Paris, graduated M.B. at Cambridge in 1833, M.L. in 1836, and M.D. in 1838. In 1839 he became physician to Addenbrooke's Hospital, a post he held for 45 years; and in the same year he was elected a fellow of the Royal College of Physicians. He resided in Caius College, was its bursar, and gradually went into practice as a physician.

Paget succeeded in 1842 in persuading the university to institute bedside examinations for its medical degrees, and these were the first regular clinical examinations held in the United Kingdom. In July 1851 he was elected Linacre lecturer on medicine at St John's College.

On his marriage Paget vacated his fellowship, and took a house in Cambridge. In 1855–6 he was president of the Cambridge Philosophical Society, and in 1856 was elected a member of the council of the senate. In 1863 he was chosen representative of the university on the General Council of Medical Education and Registration, of which he was elected president in 1869, and re-elected in 1874. In 1872 he was appointed to the regius professorship of physic at Cambridge, which he held for the rest of his life.

Paget delivered the Harveian oration at the College of Physicians in 1866; it was printed. He was elected Fellow of the Royal Society in 1873, and received an honorary degree from the university of Oxford in 1872. On 19 December 1885 he was appointed a Knight Commander of the Order of the Bath, and in 1887 he was asked to represent Cambridge University in parliament, but declined on the grounds of ill-health.

Paget died on 16 January 1892 of epidemic influenza, and was buried at Cambridge. A portrait of him as an old man is prefixed to the memoir of him by his son; and his portrait, in a red gown, was painted at an earlier age, and is in possession of his family. His bust, in marble, presented by his friends, is in Addenbrooke's Hospital, Cambridge.

== Works ==
Paget's first medical publication was "Cases of Morbid Rhythmical Movements" in the Edinburgh Medical Journal for 1847. In the Medical Times and Gazette of 24 February 1855 he published "Case of Involuntary Tendency to Fall Precipitately Forwards", and in the British Medical Journal for 22 September 1860 "Case of Epilepsy with Some Uncommon Symptoms"—these were peculiar automatic bursts of laughter; 10 December 1887, "Notes on an Exceptional Case of Aphasia" of a left-handed man who, having paralysis of the left side, had aphasia; 5 January 1889, "Remarks on a Case of Alternate Partial Anæsthesia". In The Lancet for 11 and 18 April 1868 he published "Lecture on Gastric Epilepsy", and on 4 July 1885 "Case of Remarkable Risings and Fallings of the Bodily Temperature".

Paget in 1849 printed a letter of William Harvey to Samuel Ward, master of Sidney Sussex College, and in 1850 a Notice of an Unpublished Manuscript of Harvey. The letter to Ward served him as an argument for the genuineness of Gulielmus Harvey de Musculis, No. 486 in the Sloane collection of manuscripts.

Four of Paget's lectures were published by his son after his death. Two were on alcohol, one on the etiology of typhoid fever, and one on mental causes of bodily disease.

== Family ==
Paget's younger brother Sir James Paget (1814–1899) also became a distinguished physician, working in surgery and pathology.

Paget married, on 11 December 1851, Clara, youngest daughter of the Rev. Thomas Fardell, vicar of Sutton, Isle of Ely. He had ten children, of whom seven survived him. Clara Maud Paget (1857–1949), the eldest of Sir George's daughters who survived childhood, married the German ornithologist Hans Friedrich Gadow. Rose Elizabeth Paget (1860–1951) married the famous physicist Sir J. J. Thomson. Their son was physicist George Paget Thomson.

== Notes ==
Attribution

This article incorporates text from a publication now in the public domain: Lee, Sidney, ed. (1895). "Paget, George Edward". Dictionary of National Biography. Vol. 43. London: Smith, Elder & Co.
