= Thomas Robert Bolam =

British chemist

Thomas Robert Bolam FRSE MM (1893–1969) was a 20th century British chemist.

== Life ==
He was born in Bristol on 7 September 1893. He was educated at the Fairfield Higher Grade school and the Merchant Venturers School in Bristol. He graduated BSc from Bristol University in 1914 and then at the start of the First World War he joined the Royal Engineers and served in France and Flanders winning the Military Medal. Returning to Bristol he gained an MSc in 1920 and began lecturing at the University of Edinburgh. He received a doctorate (DSc) from the university in 1930.

In 1933 he was elected a Fellow of the Royal Society of Edinburgh. His proposers were Sir James Walker, James Pickering Kendall, Ernest Bowman Ludlam and Leonard Dobbin. He served as Vice President of the Society 1959 to 1962.

In the Second World War he served as an Air Raid Warden in Edinburgh.

He died in Edinburgh on 8 July 1969.

== Publications ==
- The Donnan Equilibrium (1932)

== Family ==
In 1926 he married Mary Russell Mackenzie (d.1954). They had no children.
