= Neil Campbell (chemist) =

Scottish chemist and amateur athlete

Neil Campbell FRSE FRSC OBE (29 August 1903 – 24 July 1996) was a Scottish chemist and amateur athlete. He served as Vice President of the Royal Society of Edinburgh from 1972 to 1975. He was associated with the University of Edinburgh for 74 years of his life.

== Life ==
He was born in Edinburgh on 29 August 1903 into a family of Edinburgh actuaries, and his early education was at George Watson’s College before studying chemistry at the University of Edinburgh. He graduated with a BSc in 1926, continuing his studies with a PhD, on 'Optical activity of electrolytes' graduating in 1930. After a brief period studying at University of Tübingen in south-west Germany 1930/1, he returned to the University of Edinburgh as a lecturer in chemistry from the summer of 1931. He became a Senior Lecturer in 1952 and a professor in 1967.

He was a keen amateur runner and supporter of school athletics. At University he ran with Eric Liddell. He served as Chairman of the Edinburgh Union of Boys Clubs. In 1962 he was elected President of the Watsonian Club (former pupils of George Watsons College). He was a rugby referee (refereeing more than 600 matches), an official timekeeper at the 1958 Empire Games, and also on the Committee which set up the 1970 Commonwealth Games in Edinburgh.

He was elected a Fellow of the Royal Society of Edinburgh in 1950, his proposers including Sir Edmund Hirst and Thomas Bolam. After many years of high level service became its vice president in 1972. In 1983 he was awarded their Bicentenary Medal.

Campbell also received an Honorary Doctorate from Heriot-Watt University in 1975.

In 1976 he was elected President of Edinburgh University’s Graduate Association.

He died, a few days after the death of his wife, on 24 July 1996 in Kinghorn in Fife.

== Memorials ==
The Neil Campbell Quaich is awarded to the best overall student sportsman or woman at Heriot-Watt University in Edinburgh.

== Family ==
He was married to Marjorie Stewart (d.1996), a Scottish hockey international. They had two sons.

== Publications ==
Campbell spoke fluent German and translated several German textbooks into English. He is also noted for:

- Qualitative Organic Chemistry (1939)
- editor to Schmidt’s Textbook of Organic Chemistry (8th edition) (1947)
- contributor to Robb’s Chemistry of Carbon Compounds (1951)
- The Royal Society of Edinburgh 1783-1983 (co-written with Martin Smellie)
