= Edmund Hirst =

British chemist

- Sir Edmund Langley Hirst, FRS © National Portrait Gallery, London
- Born: Edmund Langley Hirst; 21 July 1898; Preston, Lancashire, England
- Died: 29 October 1975 (aged 77); Edinburgh, Lothian, Scotland
- Education: University of St Andrews
- Spouses: Beda Winifred Phoebe Ramsay, Kathleen (Kay) Jenny Harrison
- Awards: Tilden Prize (1939); Davy Medal (1948); Fellow of the Royal Society
- Scientific career
- Workplaces: University of Edinburgh
- Doctoral students: Sir Geoff Palmer; Sir Fraser Stoddart

Sir Edmund Langley Hirst CBE FRS FRSE (21 July 1898 – 29 October 1975), was a British chemist.

== Life ==
Hirst was born in Preston, Lancashire, on 21 July 1898, the son of Elizabeth (née Langley) and Rev Sim Hirst (1856-1923), a Baptist minister. He was educated in Burnley, Northgate Grammar School, Ipswich, Madras College in St Andrews, then studied chemistry at the University of St Andrews with a Carnegie Scholarship.

In World War I he was conscripted in 1917 and persuaded the authorities to return him to the University of St Andrews to study mustard gas. For the final year he served with the Special Brigade of the Royal Engineers in France. Returning to University in February 1919, he then obtained his BSc, followed by a doctorate (PhD) in 1921. In 1923, he began lecturing at the University of Manchester and in 1924 went to Armstrong College in Newcastle-upon-Tyne. Here, he assisted Norman Haworth in 1934 when he became the first to synthesize Vitamin C.

In 1947, he moved to the University of Edinburgh, and in 1948 was elected a Fellow of the Royal Society of Edinburgh. His proposers were James Pickering Kendall, Edmund Percival, Thomas Robert Bolam, and David Bain. He served as the Society's vice president from 1958 to 1959 and President from 1959 to 1964. He won the Gunning Victoria Jubilee Prize for 1960–64.

He held the Forbes Chair of Organic Chemistry at the University of Edinburgh and was head of department there from 1959 to 1968. He was knighted in 1964. During this time he supervised Sir Geoff Palmer, who was registered as a PhD student at the University of Edinburgh.

Hirst received an Honorary Doctorate from Heriot-Watt University in 1968.

In 1973, Hirst developed Hodgkin's disease, and his health gradually deteriorated until his death in Edinburgh on 29 October 1975.

=== Research ===
Hirst's research was extensive and resulted in over 260 publications. He and his co-workers determined the structure of all the known mono-, di-, oligo- and polysaccharides;f and worked on the composition and structures of fructans, starches and glycogens, hemicelluloses, seaweed mucilages, and of exudate gums and related polysaccharides. In addition, they synthesised authentic mono-, di- and tri-methyl ethers of arabinose, xylose, fucose, fructose, mannuronic, galacturonic, as well as glucuronic acids. Their contributions to carbohydrate chemistry were profound.

== Family ==
He married twice. In 1925, he married Beda Winifred Phoebe Ramsay. She was hospitalised due to mental illness in 1937. The marriage was dissolved in 1948, and Beda died in Glasgow in 1962. Hirst remarried the following year, to Kathleen (Kay) Jenny Harrison. He had no children by either marriage.
