= James Kendall (chemist) =

British chemist (1889–1978)

James Pickering Kendall FRS FRSE (30 July 1889, in Chobham, Surrey – 14 June 1978, in Edinburgh) was a British chemist.

== Life ==
Kendall was born in Chobham, Surrey to soldier William Henry Kendall of the Royal Horse Artillery, and his second wife Rebecca Pickering. He attended the local village school and then, from 1900, Farnham Grammar School. From 1907 to 1910, he studied at the University of Edinburgh graduating with both a BSc and MA. In 1912, with the support of a scholarship, he went to the Nobel Institute for Physical Chemistry in Stockholm to work with Arrhenius on electrolytes.

In 1913, he accepted the position as Professor of Chemistry at Columbia University, New York. Two years later he was awarded the degree of Doctor of Science (DSc) by the University of Edinburgh. He also served in 1917 as a Lieutenant Commander in the United States Naval Reserve, acting as Liaison Officer with Allied Services on Chemical Warfare.

His candidacy for the Royal Society of London in 1924 read: "Distinguished as an investigator in physical and general chemistry. Has published since 1912, partly with collaborators, over sixty papers in Proc Roy Soc, Journ Chem Soc, Phil Mag, Journ Amer Chem Soc, Journ Phys Chem, etc, dealing with the following subjects: - 'Mechanism of the Ionisation Process'; The Problem of Strong Electrolytes'; 'Correlation of Compound Formation, Ionisation and Solubility in Solution, and in Fused Salt Mixtures'; 'Prediction of Solubility in Polar Solutions'; 'Stability of Hydrates and other Additive Compounds'; 'Viscosity of Binary Mixtures'; 'A Method for the Separation of Rare Earths and of Isotopes." He was elected a Fellow (FRS) in 1927.

In 1926, he moved to be Professor of Chemistry at New York University pending a final move back to Scotland to be Professor of Chemistry at the University of Edinburgh.

In 1929, he was elected a Fellow of the Royal Society of Edinburgh. His proposers were Sir James Walker, Alexander Lauder, George Barger, and John Edwin Mackenzie. He served as the Society's Secretary from 1933 to 1936, General Secretary from 1936 to 1946, Vice President from 1946 to 1949 and President from 1949 to 1954.

In 1938, Kendall was invited to deliver the Royal Institution Christmas Lecture on Young Chemists and Great Discoveries.

In 1915, he married England born Alice Tyldesley (d.1955) in British Columbia in 1915. He retired in 1959 and died in Edinburgh in 1978. He was survived by his second wife Jane Bain Steven and children from his first marriage, including James Tyldesley Kendall FRSE.

James Kendall appears as a character in the opera Breathe Freely by Scottish Composer Julian Wagstaff. The opera's title is borrowed from Kendall's book of the same name.

== Books published ==
He wrote and co-authored several books including:

- At Home Among the atoms (1929)
- Smith's Introductory College Chemistry (revised 1938) Appleton-Century, New York
- Breathe Freely! The Truth About Poison Gas. First published April 1938, reprinted April 1938 and again in 1939 by Camelot Press Ltd London and Southampton
- Young Chemists and Great Discoveries, G. Bell & Sons, London, 1939
- Humphry Davy "Pilot" of Penzance (1954)
- Michael Faraday, Man of Simplicity (1955)
