= List of alumni of Gonville and Caius College, Cambridge =

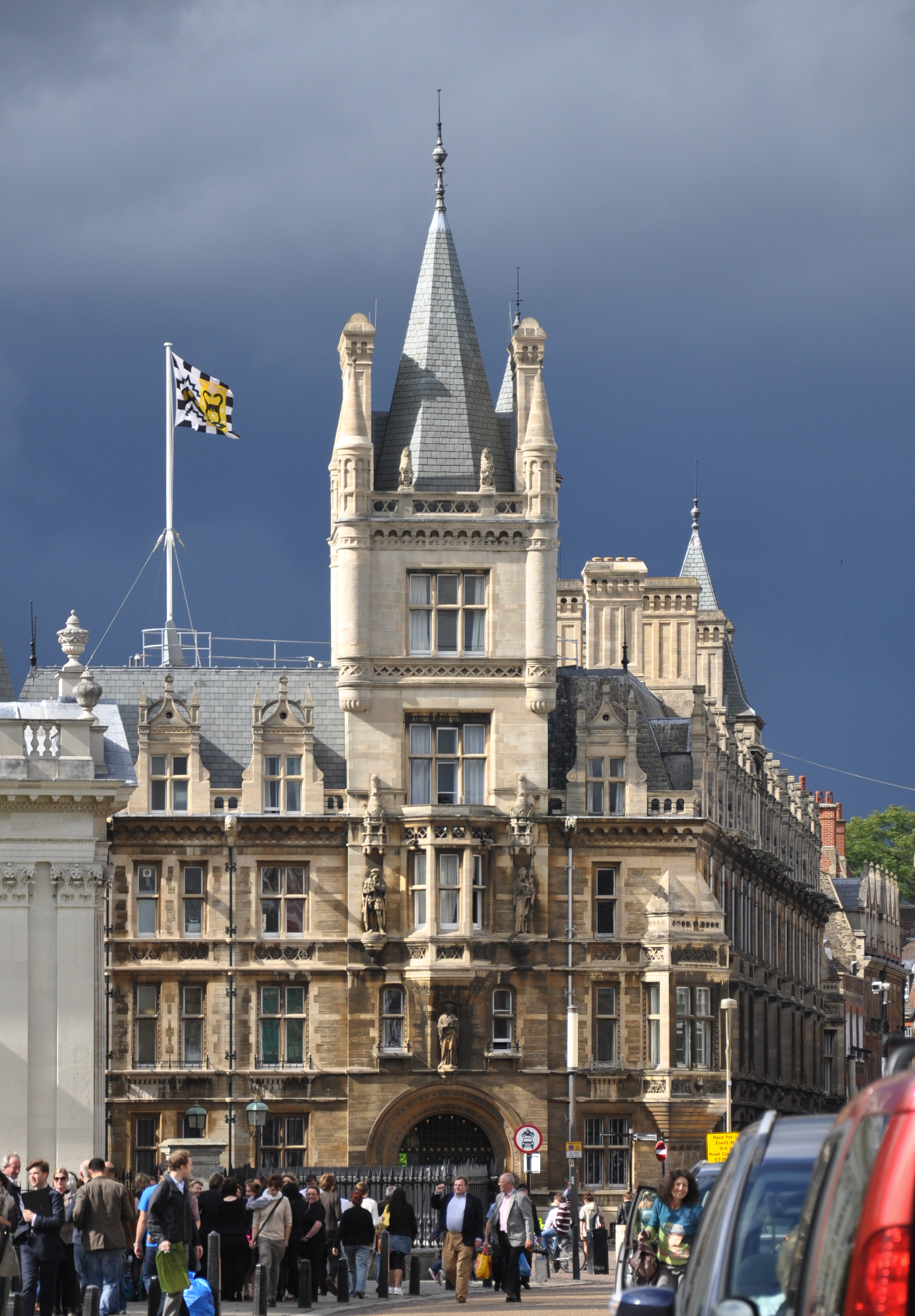
Gonville and Caius College at the University of Cambridge

Crest of Gonville and Caius College

The following is a list of notable people educated at Gonville and Caius College at the University of Cambridge, including alumni of Gonville Hall, as the college was known from 1348 to 1351, and notable alumni since.

Gonville and Caius College alumni include politicians, civil servants, academics, athletes and business leaders, including 14 Nobel Prize winners, the second-most of any Oxbridge college after Trinity College, Cambridge. Seven of these 14 were students at the college: Charles Scott Sherrington (1932, in Medicine), James Chadwick (1935, in Physics), Francis Crick (1962, in Medicine), Antony Hewish (1974, in Physics), Richard Stone (1984, in Economics), J. Michael Kosterlitz (2016, in Physics), and Peter J. Ratcliffe (2019, in Medicine).

The college also has a long-standing association with medical teaching and has educated a number of significant physicians, including John Caius, William Harvey (a pioneer of anatomy), Francis Crick (joint discoverer of the structure of DNA) and Howard Florey (co-developer of Penicillin).

== Academics ==
=== Biologists and chemists ===
- Ed Anderson – chemist
- Richard St. Barbe Baker – founder Men of the Trees
- George Thomas Bettany – biologist
- Isaac Henry Burkill – botanist
- Lawrence Michael Brown – material scientist
- Thomas Cavalier-Smith – evolutionary biologist
- Philip S. Corbet – entomologist
- Robert Percival Cook – biochemist
- Ronald Fisher – biologist and statistician
- Bernard Kettlewell - entomologist and evolutionist
- John William Scott Macfie – entomologist
- Stephen Marchant – ornithologist
- Dominic Serventy – Australian ornithologist and conservationist
- E. Barton Worthington – ecologist and science administrator

=== Economists ===
- Victoria Bateman – Gonville and Caius economics studies director
- Peter Thomas Bauer – Hungarian development economist
- Bevan Morris – Maharishi University of Management president
- Ivan Png – Singaporean economist
- Richard Stone – Nobel Prize-winning economist

=== Geographers ===
- Ralph Alger Bagnold – explorer and geologist
- John Brereton – chronicler of the first European voyage to New England, 1602
- Piers Blaikie – geographer
- John Frederick Blake – clergyman and geologist
- Gordon Manley – climatologist
- Josh West (born 1977) – British-American Earth sciences professor

A flag bearing the college's arms, which was taken by Edward Adrian Wilson to the South Pole during the Terra Nova Expedition.

- Edward Adrian Wilson – explorer who died with Robert Falcon Scott in the Antarctic

=== Historians ===
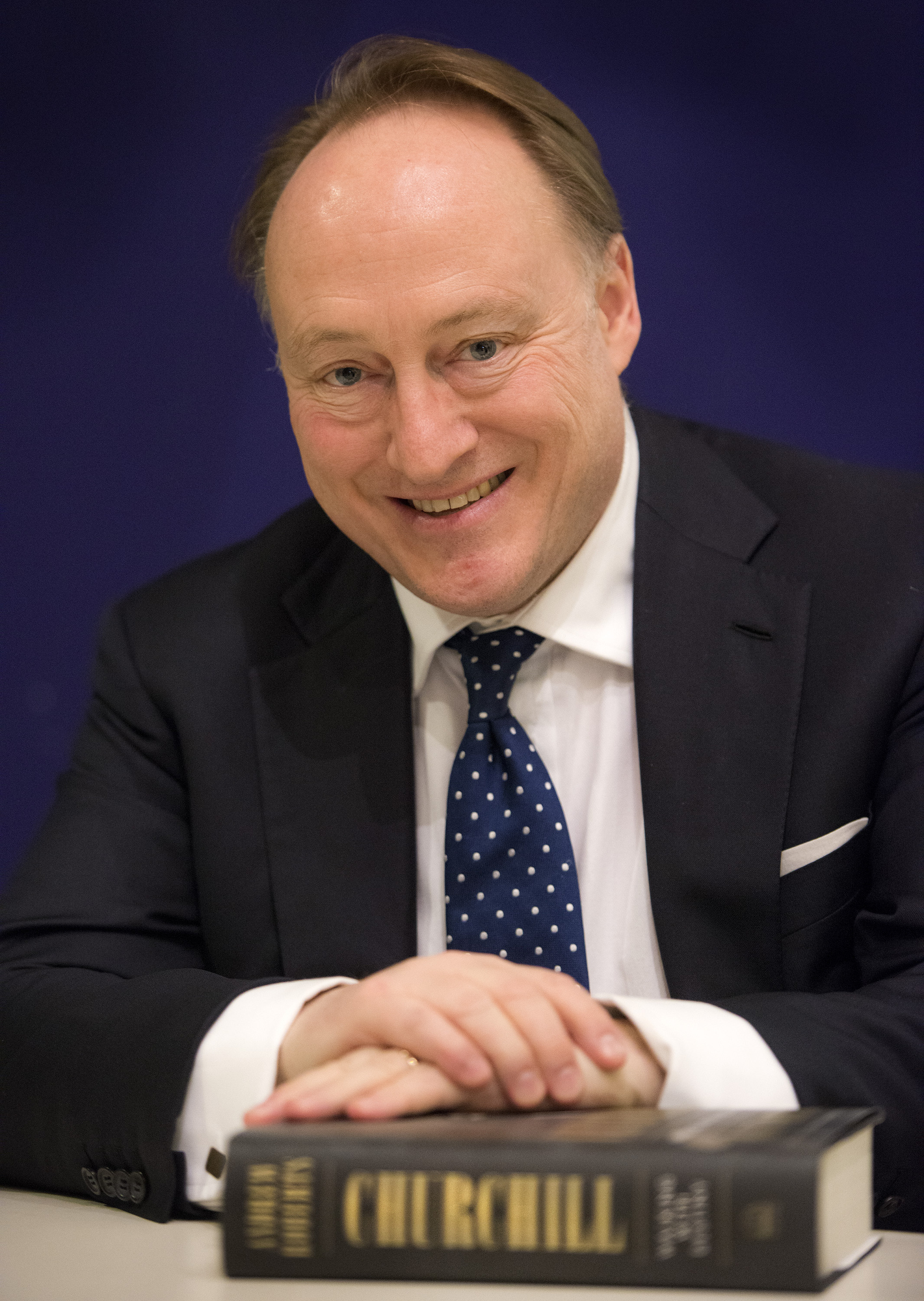
Andrew Roberts

- Tobias Abse – historian
- Francis Blomefield – historian of Norfolk
- Christopher N. L. Brooke – Dixie Professor of Ecclesiastical History and life fellow of the college
- Rajnarayan Chandavarkar – historian of South Asia
- Alfred Cobban – historian of France
- Geoffrey Crossick – historian and Vice-Chancellor of London University
- I. E. S. Edwards – egyptologist, leading expert on Egyptian pyramids
- David Feldman – historian
- Orlando Figes – historian
- Harold James – historian
- Colin Kidd – historian
- Simon Sebag Montefiore – historian and journalist
- Richard Overy – historian
- Andrew Roberts – historian
- Norman Stone – historian
- Lars Tharp – historian and broadcaster
- Stephen Tuck – historian and Pembroke College, Oxford fellow
- Lucy Beall Lott – historian and epidermolysis bullosa activist

=== Law ===
- Vincent A. De Gaetano – Former Chief Justice of Malta, former Judge of the European Court of Human Rights
- William Warwick Buckland – scholar of Roman Law, Regius Professor of Civil Law
- Henry Chauncy – scholar of law and antiquarian
- Graham J. Zellick – legal scholar and former Vice Chancellor of the University of London

=== Literature and languages ===
- James Adam – classicist
- D. R. Shackleton Bailey – classicist
- Robert Lubbock Bensly – orientalist
- Edward Valentine Blomfield – classicist
- Stanley Arthur Cook – Regius Professor of Hebrew
- Emily Hauser - classicist professor at University of Exeter
- William Ridgeway – classicists and Disney Professor of Archaeology
- A. C. Spearing – author, professor of English medieval literature
- Montgomery-Everard Lord - author of Freaky School, and “something of a polymath”

=== Mathematicians ===
- Alexander Brown – mathematician and educator in South Africa
- J. F. Cameron – mathematician, Master and Vice-Chancellor of Cambridge University
- Harish-Chandra – mathematician
- Eugenia Cheng – mathematician
- John Horton Conway – mathematician
- Quentin Stafford-Fraser – computer scientist, and inventor of the webcam
- Richard D. Gill – mathematician
- George Green – mathematician
- Chandrashekhar Khare – mathematician
- John Venn – logician, inventor of the Venn diagram

=== Philosophers and Political Scientists ===
- Mantas Adomėnas – Lithuanian philosopher
- Tim Bale – political scientist
- Michael Joseph Oakeshott – philosopher

=== Physicists ===
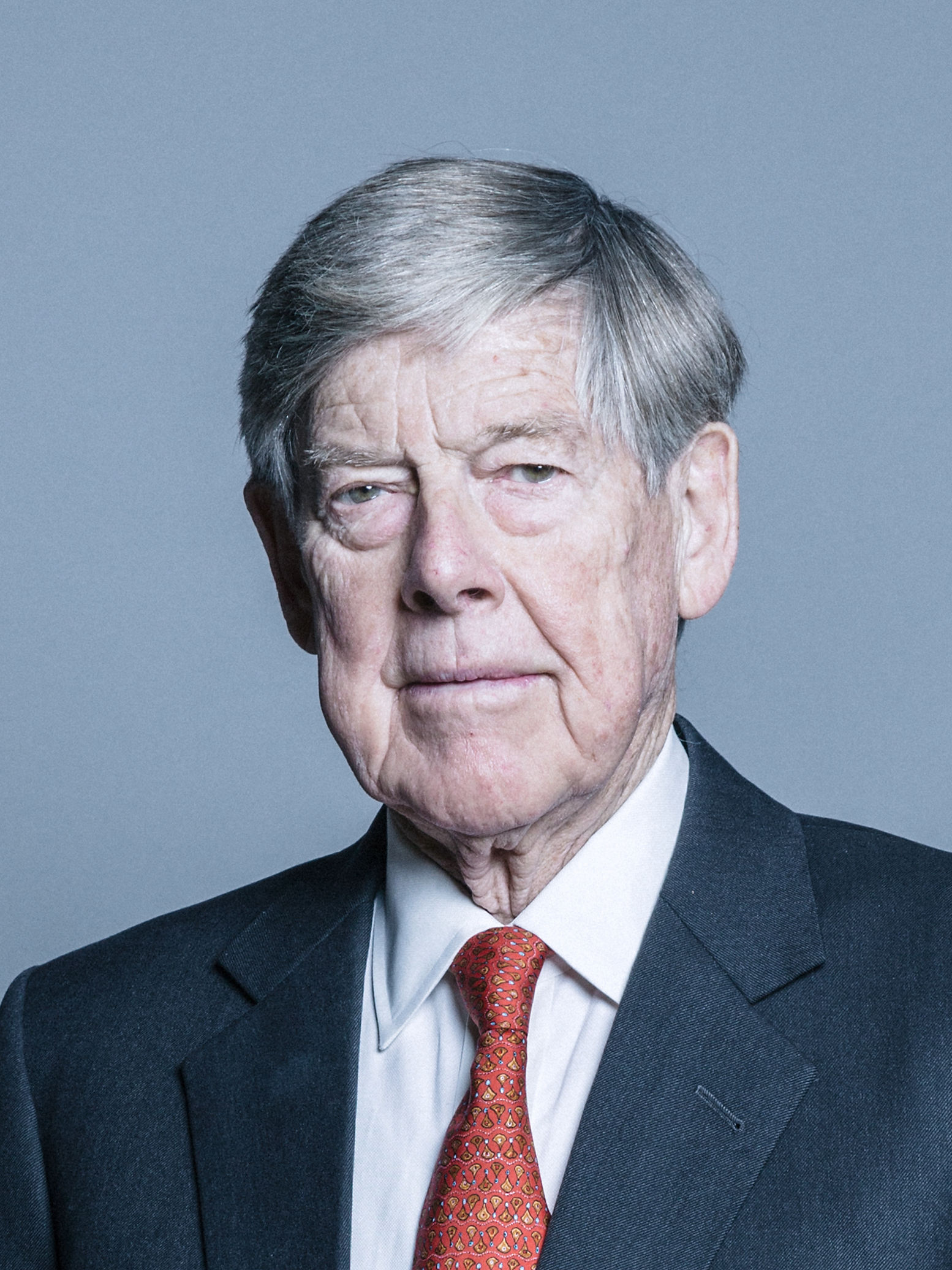
Lord Broers

- Thomas Allibone – physicist
- Étienne Biéler – Canadian physicist
- Homi J. Bhabha – Indian nuclear physicist and father of India's nuclear programme
- Max Born – Nobel Prize-winning physicist
- Alec Broers – vice-chancellor of Cambridge University
- Cecil Reginald Burch – physicist and engineer
- Chuah Joon Huang – electronic engineer
- Sam Edwards – Welsh physicist
- David J. Farrar – aeronautical engineer
- Christopher Green – Regius professor of Physics
- Basil Schonland – physicist
- Alec David Young – aeronautical engineer

=== Theologians ===
- Henry Ainsworth – nonconformist theologian and scholar
- Thomas Allen – nonconformist minister and preacher
- Robert Allwood – clergyman in colonial Australia
- William Anderson – Bishop of Salisbury
- Arthur Rawson Ashwell – theologian
- William Ayerst – clergyman and missionary
- Thomas Bacon – 15th Master of the college
- Thomas Ball – Archdeacon of Chichester
- John Ballard – priest and conspirator in the Babington Plot
- Joshua Bassett – cleric and Master of Sidney Sussex College
- St. Vincent Beechey – clergyman and photographer
- George Bland – Archdeacon of Lindisfarne (1844–53) and Archdeacon of Northumberland
- Henry Bousfield – Bishop of Pretoria
- Thomas Braddock – clergyman and translator
- F. F. Bruce – biblical scholar
- Spencer Carpenter – clergyman and theologian
- Benedict Chapman – theologian and Master of the college
- John Clarke – clergyman and natural philosopher
- Samuel Clarke – clergyman and philosopher
- Charles Coates – cleric and antiquarian
- Jeremy Collier – theologian and theatre critic
- John Cosin – Bishop of Durham (1660–72) and Master of Peterhouse
- Arthur Crosse – Archdeacon of Furness
- Islwyn Davies – clergyman and theologian
- G. H. Pember – theologian
- Jeremy Taylor – author and cleric
- Richard Watson (Royalist priest) – clergyman, academic and poet

== Artists, writers and musicians ==
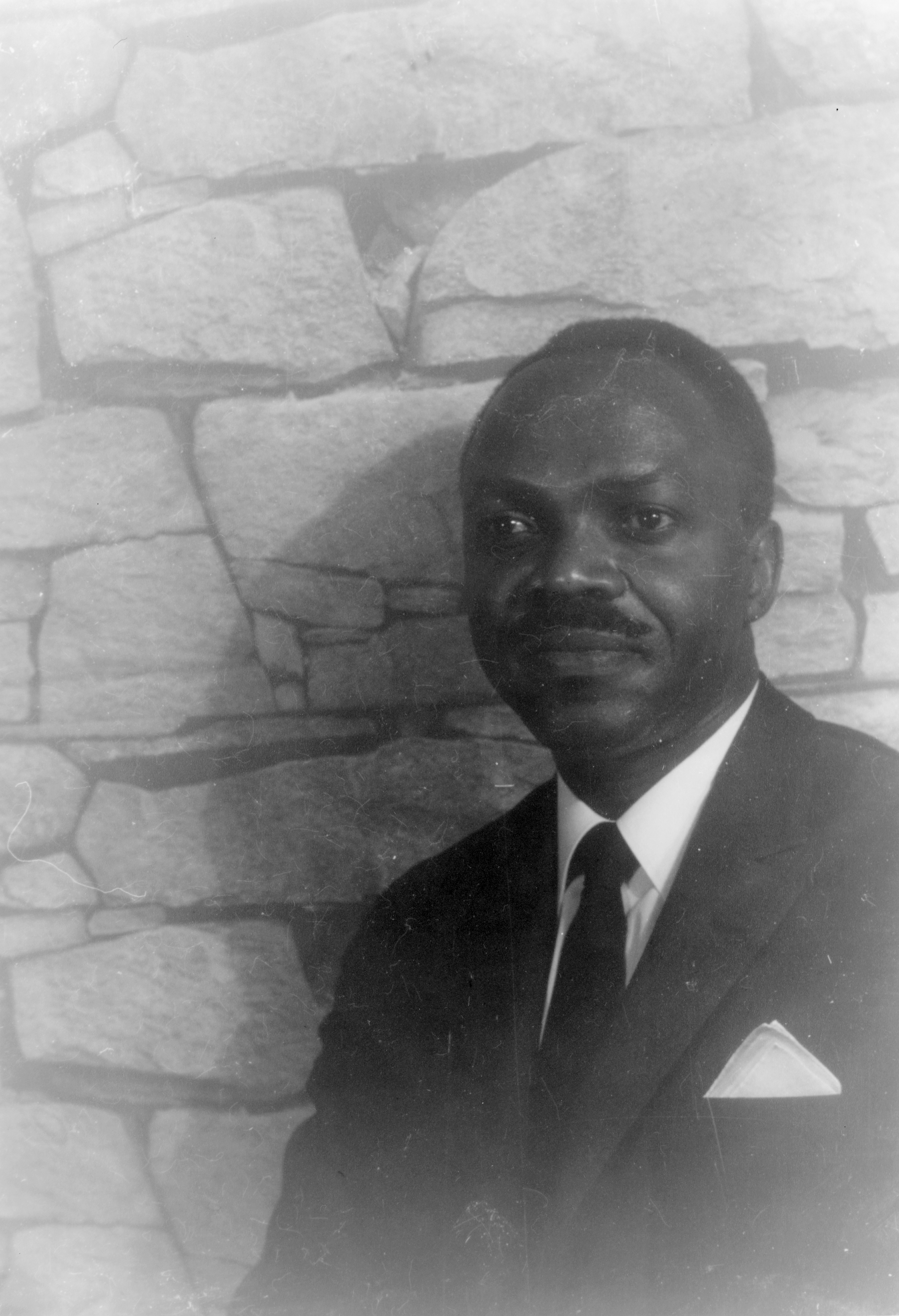
E. R. Braithwaite

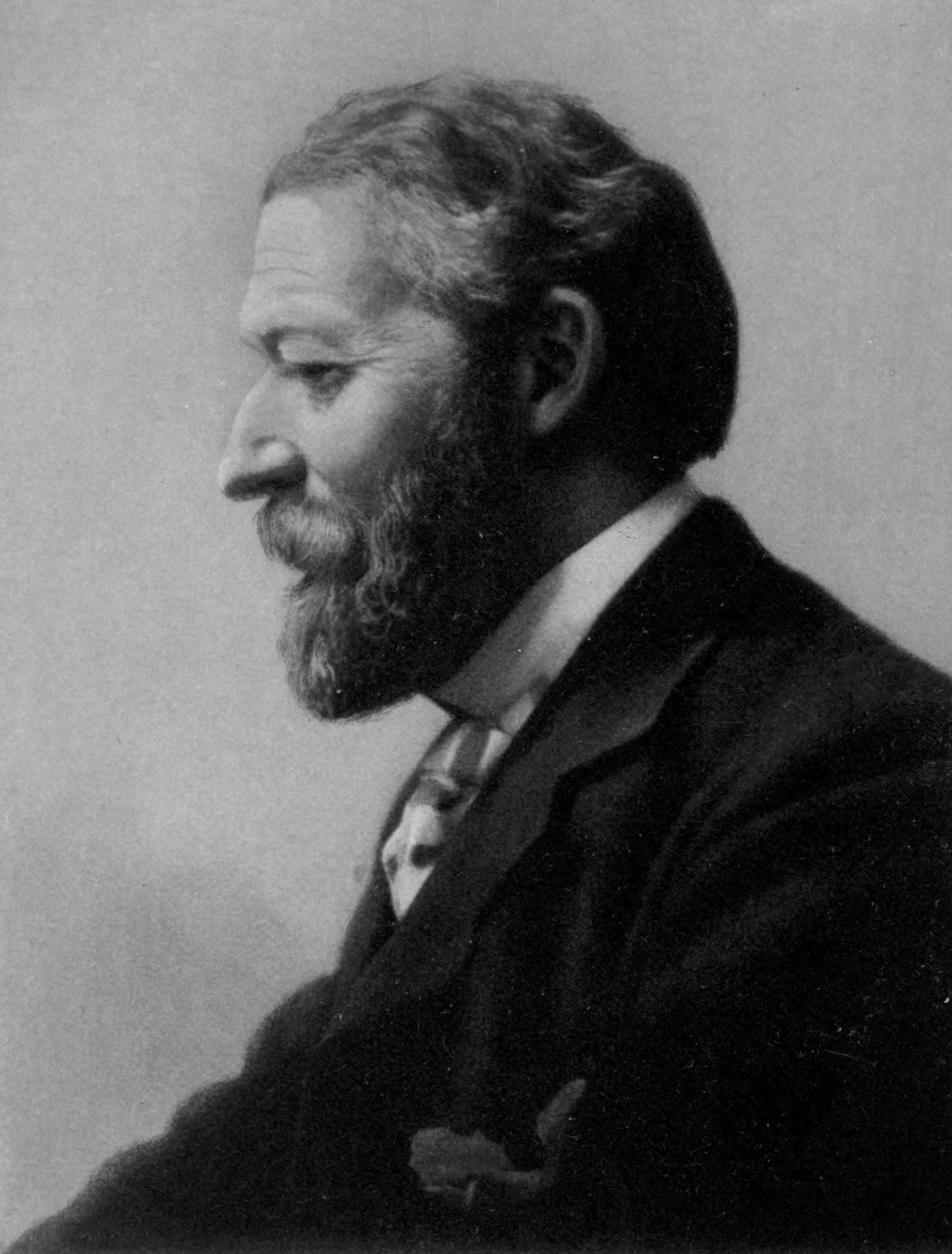
Charles Montagu Doughty

- Julian Anderson – composer
- Charles Frederick Barnwell – curator and antiquarian
- Robert Baron – poet
- Henry Bell – architect
- Edwin Keppel Bennett – poet
- Trevor Blakemore – poet
- Alain de Botton – popular philosophy writer
- Thomas Boyce – dramatist
- E. R. Braithwaite – novelist and critic of racial discrimination
- Thomas Broughton – clergyman and writer
- James Burrough – architect and Master of the college
- Arnold Cooke – composer
- William Clubbe – clergyman and poet
- Richard Cobbold – writer
- John Dighton – playwright and screenwriter
- Harold Monro – Poet, literary critic, and promoter of Modernism
- Charles Montagu Doughty – poet and explorer, author of Travels in Arabia Deserta
- Alexander Hawkins - jazz musician
- John Hookham Frere - poet, diplomat, and translator of Aristophanes
- Tim Hunkin – artist, inventor, author, cartoonist, engineer
- Geoff Nicholson – novelist
- Thomas Shadwell – playwright, Poet Laureate
- Joseph Thurston – poet
- William Wilkins – architect
- Hammond Witherley – singer

== Athletes ==
- Harold Abrahams – 100 metre Olympic gold medalist portrayed by actor Ben Cross in Chariots of Fire
- Gerry Alexander – cricketer
- Basil Allen – cricketer
- Frederick Arnold – rower and clergyman
- Harry Askew - Olympic long jumper (1948)
- Randolph Aston – rugby player
- Harold Bache – cricketer
- Andrew Baddeley – middle-distance runner
- Edward Baily – cricketer
- John Bateman-Champain – cricketer
- Iftikhar Bokhari – former Pakistani cricketer who played first-class cricket, 1952–1966
- Charles Brune – cricketer
- Ernest Brutton – rugby player and cricketer
- William Cave – rugby player
- Arthur Ceely – cricketer
- Alexander Cowie – cricketer and poet
- Thomas Selby Egan – first cox to win The Boat Race for Cambridge University
- John Fairgrieve - Olympic sprinter (1948)
- Richard Geaves – international footballer
- John Grimshaw – creator of the National Cycle Network and the Sustrans charity
- Ronald Cove-Smith – England rugby team captain
- Michael Taylor – cricketer, historian, and member of the 2015 University Challenge championship team
- William Yatman – rower and artist
- Arthur Young – rugby player

== Business and Technology ==
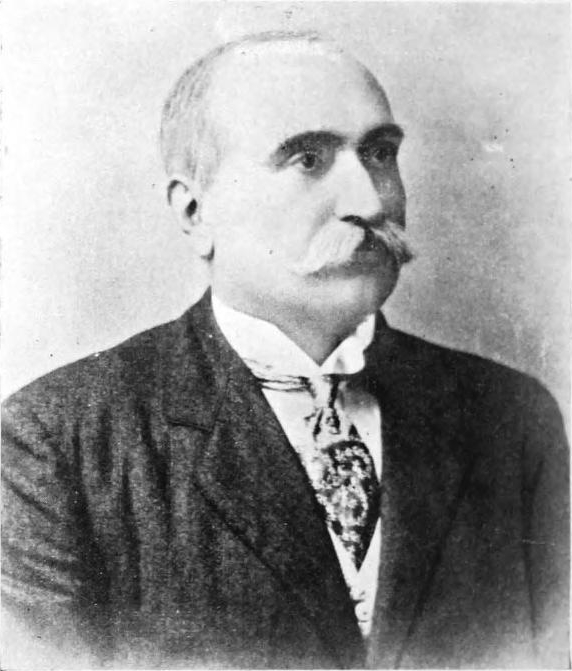
Dorabji Tata

- John Arbuthnott – businessman and peer
- Charles Barlow – businessman and philanthropist
- Vaughan Berry – financier
- Benj Conway - entrepreneur and diplomat
- Nigel Howard Croft – chairman of the ISO/TC 176
- Thomas Gresham – founder of the Royal Exchange
- Anthony Habgood – chairman of Reed Elsevier and Whitbread
- Douglas Myers – businessman and philanthropist
- Dorabji Tata – Indian industrialist and philanthropist
- Adair Turner – businessman

== Civil servants ==
- Edward Alderson – judge
- Jerome Alexander – High Court judge in Ireland
- Richard Baggallay – Conservative politician and judge of the Court of Appeal
- Nigel Baker – diplomat and former British ambassador to Bolivia and the Holy See
- Henry Bedingfield – judge
- Thomas Bedingfield – judge
- Anton Bertram – barrister and Chief Justice of Ceylon
- Henry Bickersteth – law reformer
- John Lindow Calderwood – lawyer and politician
- Alan Campbell – diplomat, former ambassador to Ethiopia and to Italy
- George William Chad – diplomat
- Alan Charlton – diplomat and former British ambassador to Brazil
- Christopher Clarke – Court of Appeal of England and Wales
- Robin Cooke – New Zealand's only judge to have sat in the House of Lords
- Samuel Cooke – judge
- Geoffrey Allan Crossley – former ambassador to Colombia and the Holy See
- Duncan Cumming – colonial administrator
- Alun Talfan Davies – Welsh judge
- Patrick Dean – British Ambassador to the United States
- George French – Chief Justice of Sierra Leone and the British Supreme Court for China and Japan
- John Hookham Frere – diplomat and author
- Colin Goad - Secretary General, IMCO, UN
- Peter Goldsmith – Attorney General for England and Wales
- Charles Kennedy – diplomat
- Dame Emily Lawson – head of the NHS COVID-19 vaccine programme
- John F. Lehman – American Secretary of the Navy and 9/11 Commission member
- Inagaki Manjirō – Japan's first Minister Resident in Siam
- Clive Sheldon – High Court judge
- Lester Paul Wright – Under Secretary at Department for Culture, Media and Sport
- Percy Wyn-Harris – colonial administrator and Governor of the Gambia

== Film and television ==
- Simon Russell Beale – actor, author, and music historian
- Jimmy Carr – comedian and presenter of The Big Fat Quiz of the Year
- Mark Wing-Davey – actor and director
- Anatole de Grunwald – Russian British film producer and screenwriter
- Stephen Mangan – actor
- Holly Walsh – comedian
- Sophie Watts – film and media executive

== Heads of state ==
- Percy Wyn-Harris – mountaineer, adventurer, and Governor of The Gambia

== Media and journalism ==
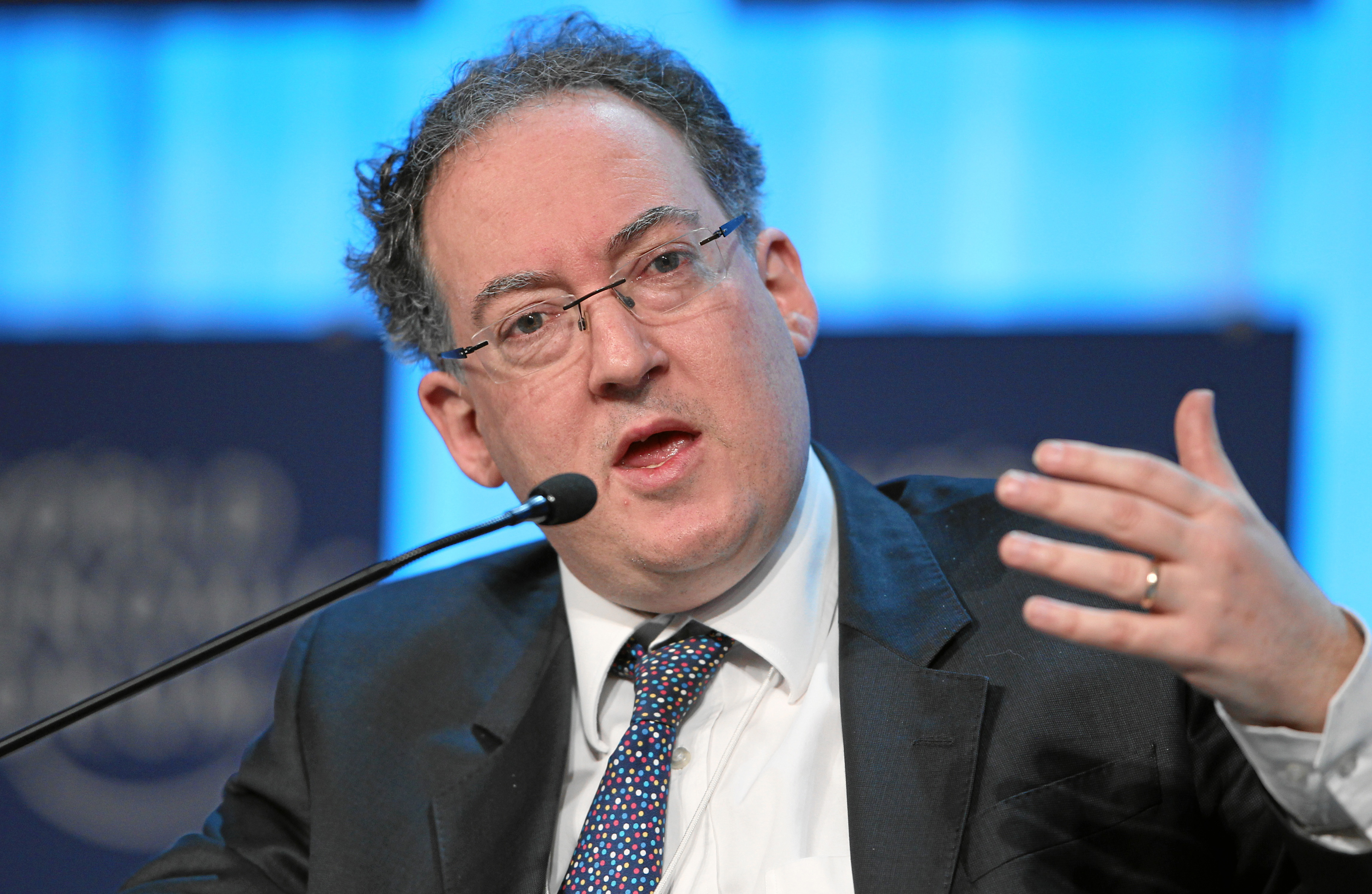
Gideon Rachman

- Alistair Appleton – TV presenter
- Charles Beavan – law reporter
- Helen Castor – historian and BBC Radio 4 broadcaster
- Thomas Chenery – editor of The Times
- Mark Damazer – BBC Radio 4 and BBC Radio 4 Extra controller and Master of St Peter's College, Oxford
- Jonathan Davis – Financial Times and The Independent columnist
- David Elstein – media executive, founder of Channel 5 television
- Carolyn Fairbairn – media executive
- David Frost – broadcaster
- Tim Gardam – journalist and educator
- Andrew Gowers – journalist
- Christopher Helm – publisher
- Gideon Rachman – journalist
- Mick Rock – photographer
- Merryn Somerset Webb - journalist and author

== Military ==
- Harold Ackroyd – Victoria Cross recipient for his actions in the Battle of Passchendaele
- Geoffrey Appleyard – British Army officer
- Peter Churchill – Special Operations Executive (SOE) officer in France during the Second World War
- Brian de Courcy-Ireland – naval officer
- Henry St John Fancourt – naval aviator
- Richard Tomlinson – former British MI6 officer

== Physicians ==
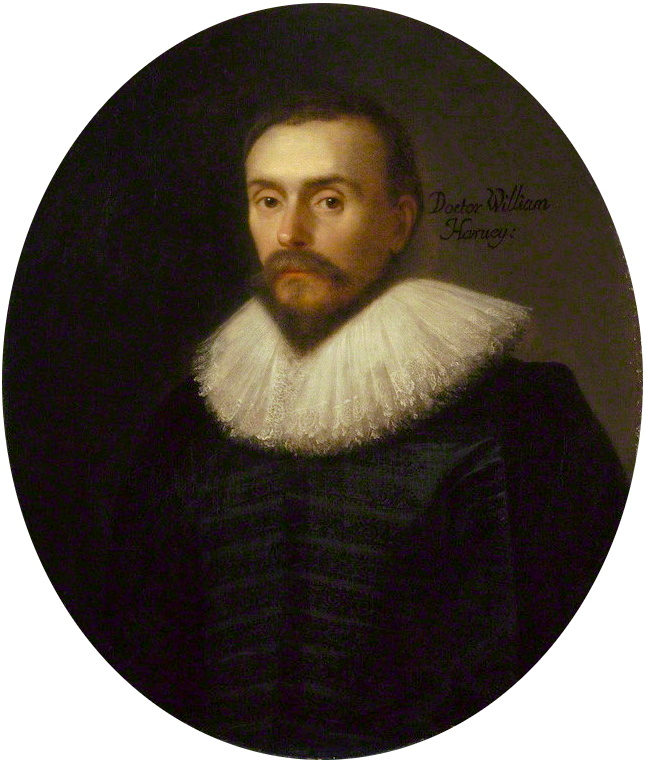
William Harvey

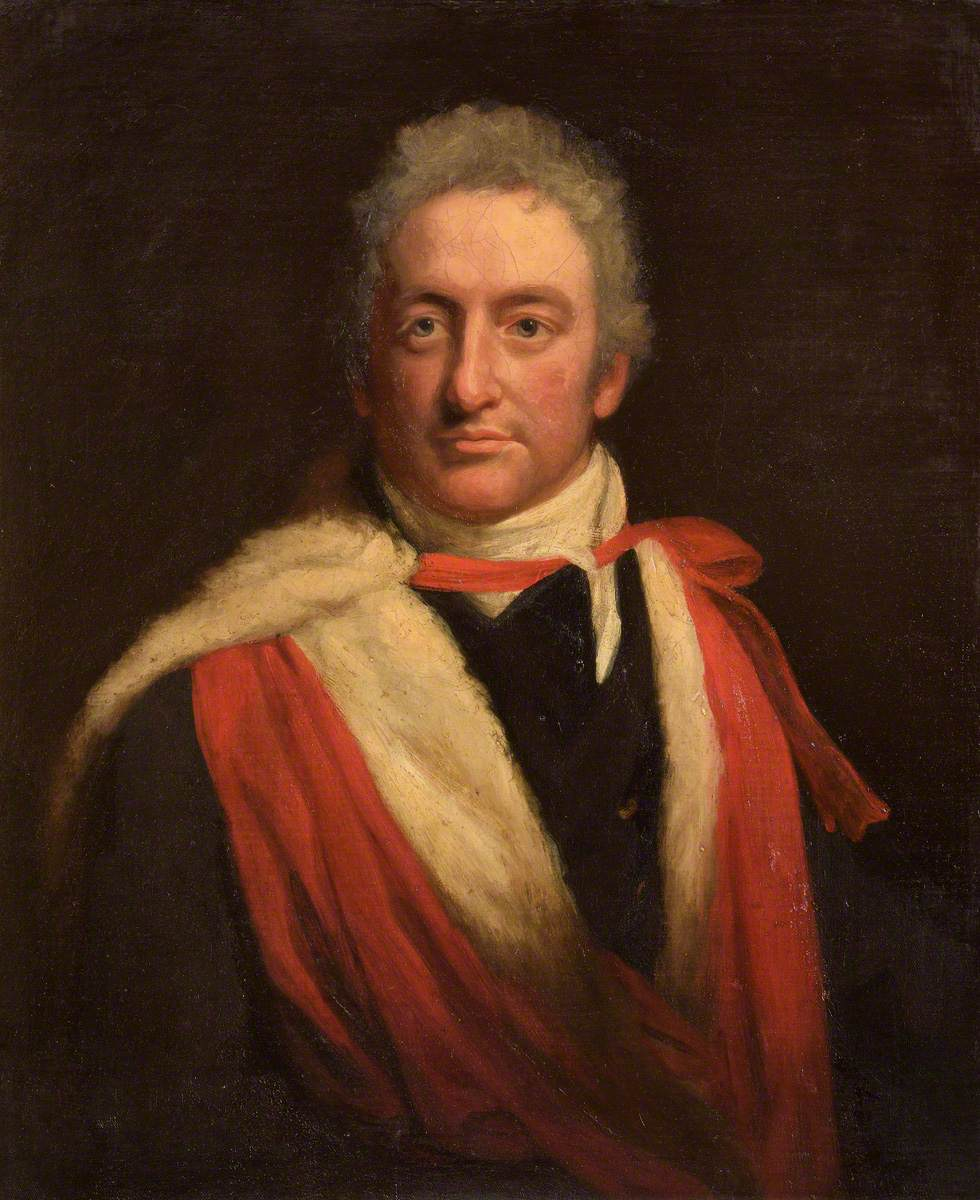
Martin Davy

- George Francis Abercrombie – physician and co-founder of the College of General Practitioners
- John Carr Badeley – physician
- Andrew Balfour – medical writer and novelist
- Andrew Whyte Barclay – physician
- Tom Armstrong Bowes – physician and antiquarian
- George Burrows – physician and President of the Royal College of Physicians
- Henry Burton – physician and chemist, discoverer of Burton's line
- William Butts – King Henry VIII's physician
- John Caius – physician and second founder of the college
- Walter Butler Cheadle – paediatrician
- John Brian Christopherson – physician and a pioneer of chemotherapy
- Cyril Clarke – physician, geneticist and lepidopterist
- Rodney Cove-Smith – physician and rugby player
- Maurice Craig – psychiatrist
- Martin Davy – physician, academic and master of the college
- Arthur Farre – obstetric physician
- Harold Gillies – "the father of plastic surgery"
- William Harvey – medical pioneer
- Bill Inman – pharmacovigilance pioneer
- Bernard Kettlewell - doctor, geneticist, evolutionist
- Basil Mackenzie – physician
- Walter Myers – physician and parasitologist
- Howard Somervell – surgeon, mountaineer, and missionary
- Reginald Eleady-Cole - physician, cardiologist, and philanthropist

== Politicians ==
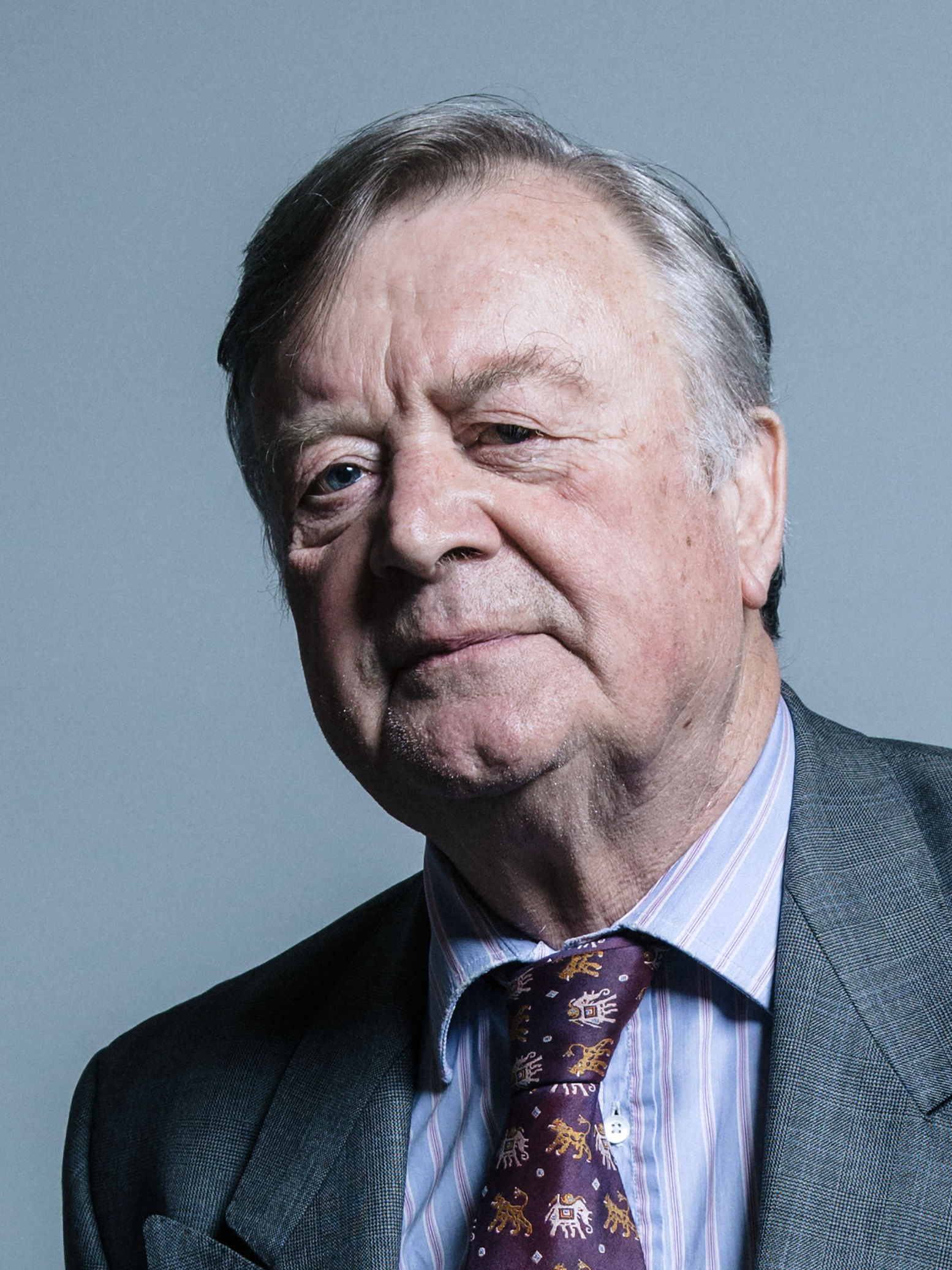
Kenneth Clarke

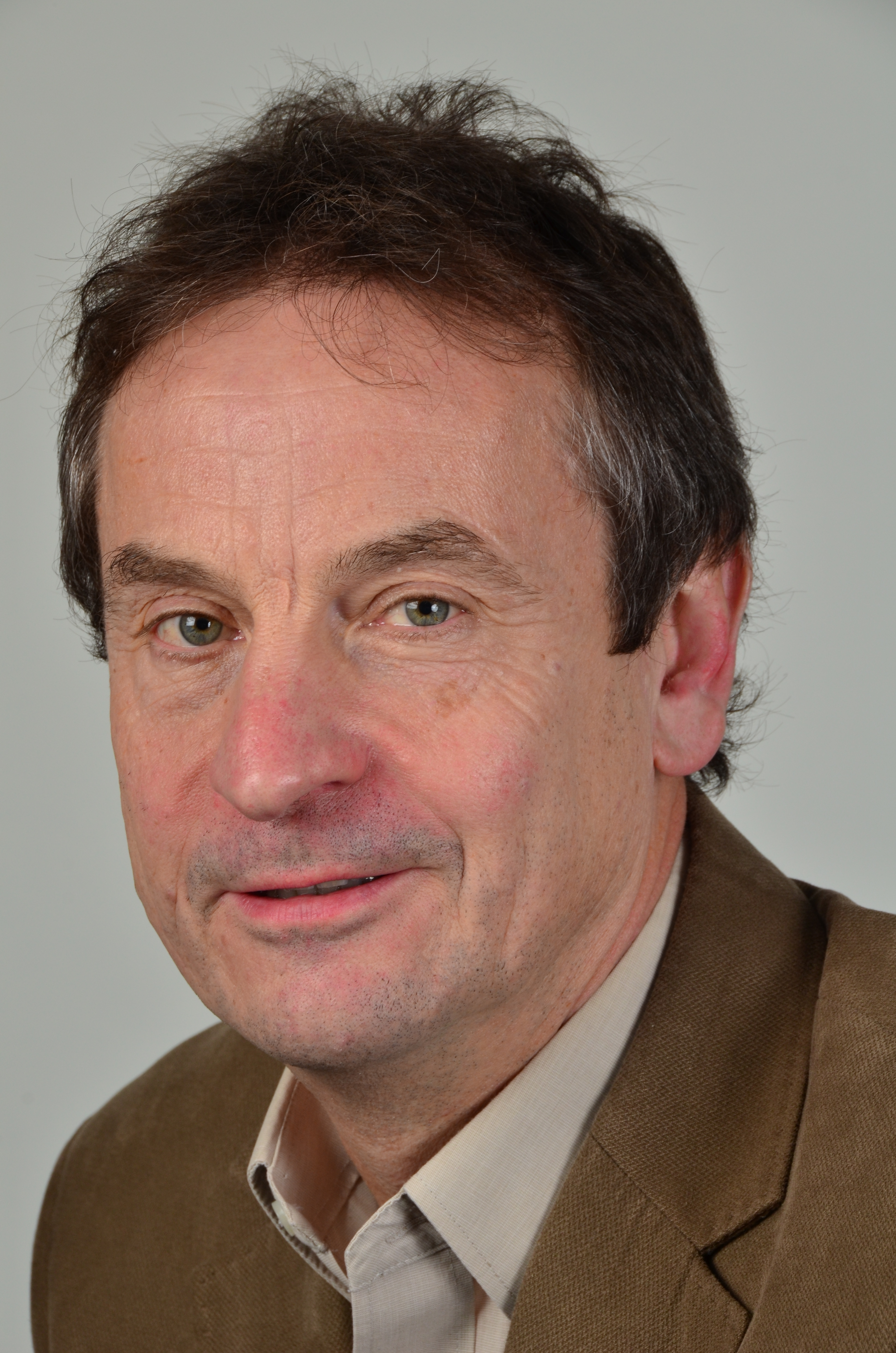
Chris Davies

- Jack Ashley – Labour politician and peer
- Ernest Baggallay – Conservative politician
- Esmond Birnie – Ulster Unionist Party politician and former member of the Northern Ireland Assembly
- Paul Bryan – Conservative politician
- Alastair Campbell – Labour politician and aide to Tony Blair
- Robert Carr – Conservative MP and Home Secretary
- Kenneth Clarke – Conservative MP, Father of the House, former Lord Chancellor and Secretary of State for Justice and former Chancellor of the Exchequer
- Bob Clay – Labour politician
- Rice Richard Clayton – Conservative politician
- Sarah Cooper-Lesadd MS – Reform UK politician, Member of the Senedd for Pen-y-bont Bro Morgannwg, Chair of the Senedd Legislation Committee and Shadow Minister for Children, Young People and Skills
- Chris Davies – Liberal Democrat politician
- Quentin Davies – Labour politician and former MP for Grantham and Stamford (1987–2010)
- Peter Fraser, Baron Fraser of Carmyllie – Scottish Conservative politician
- Donald Johnson – Conservative MP, general practitioner, author
- Elwyn Jones, Baron Elwyn-Jones – Labour politician, Lord Chancellor
- Thomas Lynch Jr. – Founding Father of the United States who signed United States Declaration of Independence
- Iain Macleod – Conservative MP and former Chancellor of the Exchequer
- John Morris, Baron Morris of Aberavon – Labour politician and Cabinet minister
- Keith Vaz – Labour politician
- Vivian Wineman – President of the Board of Deputies of British Jews

== Royalty ==
- Lady Nicholas Windsor (Paola Doimi de Frankopan) – Croatian aristocrat and wife of Lord Nicholas Windsor

== Other ==
- Lawrence Beesley – survivor of the Titanic
- Michael Kidson – schoolmaster at Eton College
- Titus Oates – Popish plotter
