= Andrew Roberts, Baron Roberts of Belgravia =

English historian and journalist (born 1963)

The Right Honourable The Lord Roberts of Belgravia FRSL FRHistS
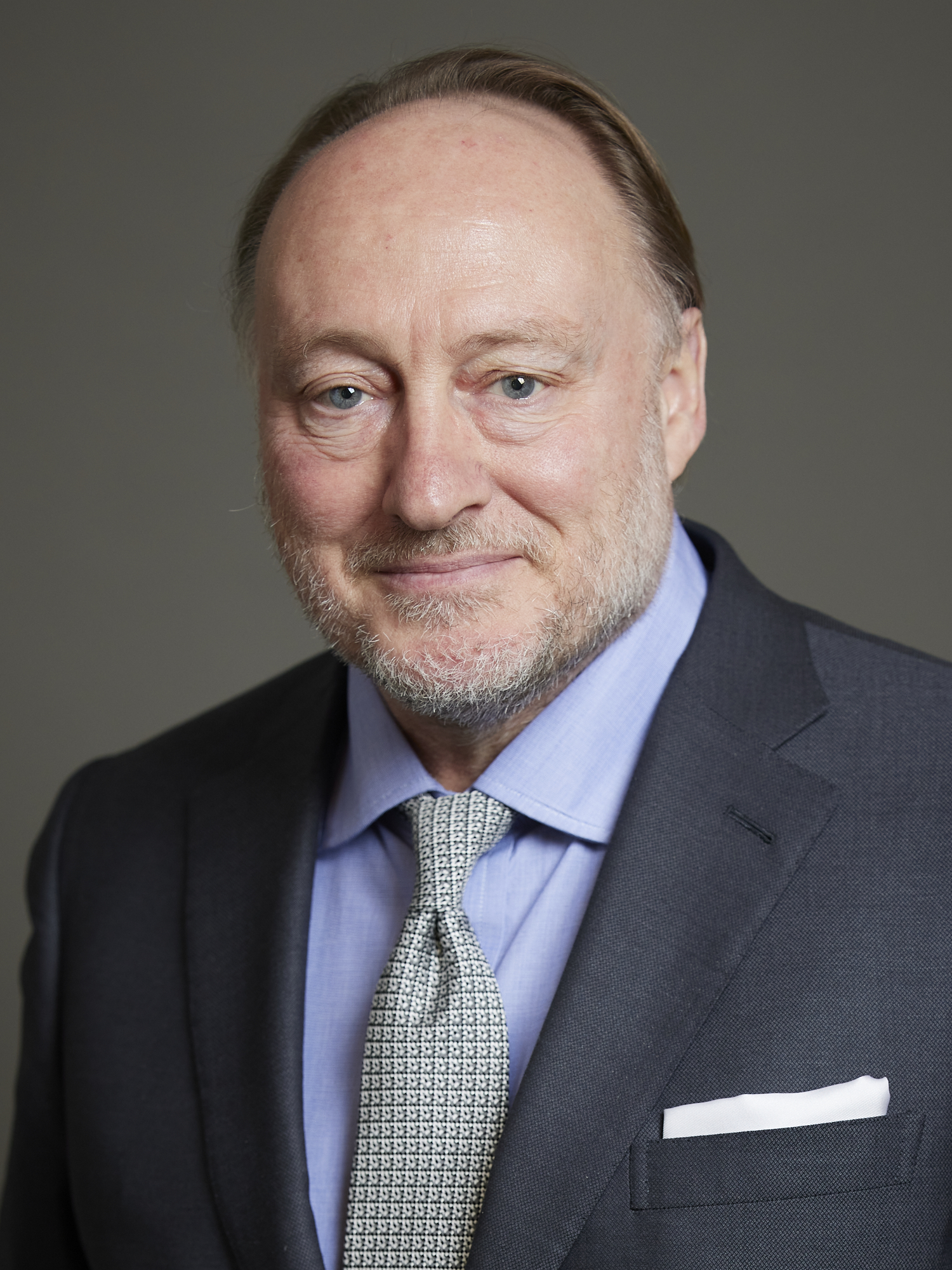
- Official portrait, 2023

Member of the House of Lords
- Lord Temporal
- Life peerage 1 November 2022

Personal details
- Born: 13 January 1963 (age 63) Hammersmith, London, England
- Party: Conservative
- Spouses: Camilla Henderson (m. 1995; div. 2001); Susan Gilchrist
- Education: Gonville and Caius College, Cambridge
- Occupation: Historian; journalist
- Awards: Wolfson History Prize (2000)
- Website: andrew-roberts.net

Andrew Roberts, Baron Roberts of Belgravia (born 13 January 1963), is an English popular historian and journalist. He is the Bonnie and Tom McCloskey Visiting Research Fellow at the Hoover Institution at Stanford University and a Lehrman Institute Distinguished Lecturer at the New York Historical Society. He was a trustee of the National Portrait Gallery, London, from 2013 to 2021.

Roberts's historical research has focused mostly on English-speaking nations, particularly those closely tied socially to the United Kingdom, such as the United States. Roberts is known internationally for his 2009 book The Storm of War, which covers socio-political factors of the Second World War, such as Adolf Hitler's rise to power and the administrative organisation of Nazi Germany. It received the British Army Military Book of the Year Award for 2010, and achieved commercial success, reaching No. 2 on The Sunday Times best-seller list. Much of Roberts's later work, including his 2014 and 2018 biographies of Napoleon and Sir Winston Churchill, has been widely praised. Roberts's public commentary has additionally appeared in several British publications, such as The Daily Telegraph and The Spectator, including his support for Atlanticism within international relations.

== Early life and education ==
Andrew Roberts was born in Hammersmith, London, on 13 January 1963, the son of Kathleen (née Hillery-Collings) and Simon Roberts, a business executive. Simon, from Cobham, Surrey, inherited the Job's Dairy milk business and also owned the British franchise of Kentucky Fried Chicken. A prolific reader as a child, Roberts soon gained a passion for history, particularly for dramatic works relating to "battles, wars, assassinations and death".

Roberts attended Cranleigh School in Surrey and read modern history at Gonville and Caius College, Cambridge, where he was chairman of the Cambridge University Conservative Association. He graduated with a first-class honours BA degree and took a PhD in modern history. Roberts began his career in corporate finance as an investment banker and private company director with the London merchant bank Robert Fleming & Co., where he worked from 1985 to 1988. He published his first historical book in 1991.

== Historical and socio-political viewpoints ==
=== Commentary on history ===
In the context of the First World War, Roberts believes that the treaty obligations imposed on the German Empire should have been significantly tougher. He has stated that the victorious powers of the Entente alliance should have broken up Germany into component sub-national territories akin to the disorganised situation prior to the unification of Germany in the mid-1800s. Ultranationalism was eventually "burned out of the German soul", in Roberts's opinion, at a truly devastating cost.

Roberts's analysis of the Second World War states that the Nazi German government had significant advantages in military organisation and economic power early in the war. He has argued that, if someone other than Adolf Hitler had control of the nation's military strategy, the country would likely have forgone a costly direct invasion of Soviet territory, which occurred through Operation Barbarossa, and instead would have swept through Mediterranean territories before trying to seal off British-controlled Middle East areas. Roberts has stated his belief that likely morale-building victories against the comparatively weak forces to the southeast could have allowed Hitler to essentially win the war.

According to Roberts, the other key strategic mistake was the German declaration of war against the United States, which was announced only four days after the Pearl Harbor attacks despite the fact that the Nazi regime had no legal obligation to take such an action. Roberts has stated that, after the declaration, Germany could not keep the US war-making economic machine at bay. Thus, in his view, the "mistakes, delusions, and exaggerated self-confidence complexes that the fascist government fostered proved its undoing."

Roberts has additionally stated that he views Joseph Stalin's control of the Soviet Armed Forces as having been disastrous to the allied efforts against the Axis powers. He has commented that Stalin's obsessive tactics of killing his own men for ideological reasons cost him thousands upon thousands of troops. He claimed that in the Battle of Stalingrad alone, Soviet forces killed the equivalent of two full divisions of their own personnel.

More recently, Roberts has whole-heartedly embraced Thatcherism. He is a staunch backer of British Prime Minister Margaret Thatcher and her socio-political legacy. In Roberts's opinion, Thatcher's decision to keep Britain out of the euro currency, while retaining strong ties with various European economies and otherwise engaging in international trade, has been validated by the Eurozone crisis in the aftermath of the Great Recession. After the British prime minister Tony Blair of the Labour Party resigned, Roberts assessed him as an "exemplary war leader" with his "vigorous prosecution of the War against Terror", which would leave him regarded as a "highly successful prime minister". In the 2016 United Kingdom European Union membership referendum, Roberts backed the "Leave" vote.

=== Support for the Iraq War and military intervention ===
Roberts supports a strong American military and has generally argued in favour of close relations between the Anglosphere nations. As an advocate for the general principle of democratic pluralism, he has argued that "[s]neered at for being 'simplistic' in his reaction to 9/11, Bush's visceral responses to the attacks of a fascistic, totalitarian death cult will be seen as having been substantially the right ones" in the long run. In many writings, he has come out in support of neo-conservative influenced socio-political viewpoints.

During the buildup to the Iraq War, Roberts supported the proposed invasion, arguing that anything less would be tantamount to appeasement, comparing Tony Blair to Winston Churchill in his "astonishing leadership". He additionally argued that acting against Saddam Hussein was in line with the "Pax Americana realpolitik that has kept the Great Powers at peace since the Second World War, despite the collapse of Communism".

In 2003 Roberts wrote: "For Churchill, apotheosis came in 1940; for Tony Blair, it will come when Iraq is successfully invaded and hundreds of weapons of mass destruction are unearthed from where they have been hidden by Saddam's henchmen." When such weapons were not found, Roberts still defended the invasion for larger strategic reasons, while arguing that his past views were based on credible assessments from intelligence services as well as other sources.

=== Antisemitism ===
Roberts treats antisemitism as "a particularly virulent form of racism against Jews" and argues that pro-Palestinian demonstrations can involve racial hatred against Jews even when such hostility is presented as opposition to Israel. Roberts criticises sections of the political left for what he regards as hypocrisy in failing to defend Jews after decades of campaigning against racism, and calls for a "culture of moral abhorrence of antisemitism". He conceives of antisemitism as an ancient phenomenon which, like a "plague bacillus", changes its outward form while remaining essentially the same. He argues that Jews are "on the front line of the West's present struggle between civilization and Islamist fundamentalist totalitarian barbarism" and concludes that "Gentiles must stand with the Jews, come what may."

Roberts interprets the reaction following the October 7 attacks as a reversal in which Jewish victims, rather than the perpetrators, became objects of condemnation. He describes denial of the atrocities as "a modern form of Holocaust denial". He rejects the assumption that higher education guards against antisemitism, arguing that "much of the worst antisemitism is nowadays to be found being spread on elite Western campuses, often by people with PhDs," and noting that most of those at the Wannsee Conference also held doctorates.

=== Israeli–Palestinian conflict ===
Roberts sees the existence of a sovereign Jewish state as the safeguard that "guarantees that the obscenity of genocide will never again befall the Jewish people". He rejects the claim that Jewish migration to Israel is colonialism since Jews who move there are returning to their "homeland of 30 centuries". He also rejects the apartheid analogy as "entirely erroneously used against Israel" by pointing to the civic, legal and electoral rights enjoyed by Arab citizens of Israel, whom he argues have "far better civil rights than many Arabs living in neighbouring Arab states".

Roberts argues that during the Gaza war, the Israel Defense Forces fought with "exemplary ethical consideration" in "horrendous circumstances" and to "an ethical standard equivalent to the best in the world". He is critical of Western attempts to pressure Israel through sanctions, such as the measures promoted by Ed Miliband in 2026, arguing that Israel is "a sovereign democracy whose voters should be left to decide such issues at the ballot box, not through diktats from London, Paris and Ottawa", and asking, "Where's the morality in sanctioning a small democracy like Israel, but not large autocracies?"

Roberts denies that Israeli settlements in the West Bank are "the obstacle to peace" and instead defines "Palestinian rejectionism" as the central impediment, arguing that Palestinians have "never missed an opportunity to miss an opportunity for peace". He calls the UK government to de-recognise Palestinian statehood. For him, the UK recognition of Palestine in 2025 "reward[ed] Hamas for its 7th of October attacks". He states that "settler violence is indefensible" and that Israel "should hold those responsible to account". He also supports banning what he calls "pro-Palestinian hate marches" during a national emergency where they feature racial hatred against Jews.

=== Political opinions ===
Roberts endorsed Kemi Badenoch in the 2024 Conservative Party leadership election.

== Authorship and television appearances ==
=== Early works ===
The first of Roberts's books was a biography of the Earl of Halifax, Foreign Secretary to Neville Chamberlain and Winston Churchill, entitled The Holy Fox, and published in 1991. Roberts provides a historical revisionism account of Lord Halifax, a one-time viceroy of India and the foreign secretary in Chamberlain's government. Halifax has been charged with appeasement, along with Chamberlain, but Roberts argues that Halifax began to move his government away from that policy vis-à-vis Nazi Germany following the 1938 Munich Crisis. This work was followed in 1994 by Eminent Churchillians, a collection of essays about friends and enemies of Churchill. A large part of the book is an attack on Admiral of the Fleet the Earl Mountbatten of Burma, and other prominent members of the elite. The title is an obvious allusion to the famous and similarly combative book of biographies Eminent Victorians.

In 1995 Roberts published The Aachen Memorandum, a thriller novel based on Britain and its relationship with a fictionalised European Union. In 1996, Roberts offered his "personal view" of the Suez Crisis in an Open Media production for BBC TV. Radio Times described the programme: "Forty years after Eden's decision to deploy troops against the Egyptians, Andrew Roberts argues that the former prime minister should be congratulated, not chastised, for fighting to protect British assets."

In 1999 Roberts published Salisbury: Victorian Titan, a biography of the Victorian-era prime minister the Marquess of Salisbury. The historian Michael Korda praised the work as "a masterpiece about one of the greatest and most able Tory political figures of the Victorian age". The book additionally won the Wolfson History Prize and the James Stern Silver Pen Award for Non-Fiction. In September 2001 Napoleon and Wellington, an investigation into the relationship between the two generals, was published by Weidenfeld and Nicolson, and was the subject of the lead review in all but one of Britain's national newspapers.

January 2003 saw the publication of Hitler and Churchill: Secrets of Leadership. In the book, which addresses the leadership techniques of Hitler and Churchill, he delivered a rebuttal to many of the assertions made by Clive Ponting and Christopher Hitchens concerning Churchill. An accompanying television series based around Roberts's Hitler and Churchill ran on BBC2, with its first episode being broadcast on 7 March 2013. Roberts remarked that he felt grateful for the BBC's support of his work and their unwillingness to cut corners when it came to exploring history in detail, quipping as well about the group's wardrobe policy, "Courtesy of this programme, I now have two Armani suits upstairs."

Also in 2003, Roberts became a Fellow of the Royal Society of Arts. In 2004 he edited What Might Have Been, a collection of twelve "What If?" essays written by historians and journalists, including Robert Cowley, Antonia Fraser, Norman Stone, Amanda Foreman, Simon Sebag Montefiore, Conrad Black, and Lady Anne Somerset. In 2005 Roberts published Waterloo: Napoleon's Last Gamble, which was published in America as Waterloo: The Battle for Modern Europe.

His A History of the English-Speaking Peoples Since 1900, a sequel to the four-volume work of Churchill's biography, was published in September 2006, and won the Intercollegiate Studies Institute Book Award. Masters and Commanders describes how four figures shaped the strategy of the West during the Second World War. It was published in November 2008 and won the International Churchill Society Book Award and was shortlisted for two other military history book prizes. The Art of War is a two-volume chronological survey of the greatest military commanders in history. It was compiled by a team of historians, including Robin Lane Fox, Tom Holland, John Julius Norwich, Jonathan Sumption, and Felipe Fernández-Armesto, working under the general editorship of Roberts.

=== Overview of the Second World War ===
The Storm of War: A New History of the Second World War came out in August 2009. A detailed look at the history of events behind the Second World War and various key elements within it such as the nature of Nazi Germany's rule, the book received large popular success and reached number two in The Sunday Times bestseller list. It additionally earned the British Army Military Book of the Year Award for 2010.

The Storm of War received a wide variety of praise in publications such as The Daily Beast, where Korda lauded it as written "superbly well" and stated that Roberts's "scholarship is superb", and The Wall Street Journal, where the historian Jonathan W. Jordan said that Roberts "splendidly weaves a human tragedy into a story". Support also came from figures such as the American political commentator Peter Robinson and the English historian Paul Johnson. In the book Roberts aims to paint a concise yet highly detailed picture of the conflict in which he argues that Joseph Stalin and Hitler both took terrible actions due to their repressive ideologies, throwing thousands and thousands of lives away in the process, yet the eventual defeat of the Axis powers constituted a moral triumph of democratic pluralism over authoritarianism that led the way to a better future.

=== Biography of Napoleon ===
In 2014 Roberts wrote Napoleon the Great (the American edition is titled Napoleon: A Life), which was awarded the 2015 Los Angeles Times Book Prize for best biography. In this biography, Roberts seeks to evoke Napoleon's tremendous energy, both physical and intellectual, and the attractiveness of his personality, even to his enemies. The book argues against many long-held historical opinions, including the myth of a great romance with Joséphine de Beauharnais. She took a lover immediately after their marriage, as Roberts shows, and Napoleon in fact had three times as many mistresses as he acknowledged. Roberts goes through fifty-three of Napoleon's sixty battlefields, and he additionally evaluates a gigantic new French edition of Napoleon's letters, aiming to create a complete re-evaluation of the man.

Like The Storm of War, Roberts's life of Napoleon received critical praise from a wide range of publications. In October 2014 the journalist Jeremy Jennings wrote for Standpoint that, "Napoleon could have had few biographers more dedicated to their subject." Jennings additionally labelled the book a "richly detailed and sure-footed reappraisal of the man, his achievements—and failures—and the extraordinary times in which he lived". The book earned the Prix du Jury des Grands Prix de la Fondation Napoléon for 2014, an award given by the historical organisation Fondation Napoléon.

Praise additionally came from the historian Jay Winik: "With his customary flair and keen historical eye, Andrew Roberts has delivered the goods again. This could well be the best single volume biography of Napoleon in English for the last four decades. A tour de force that belongs on every history-lover's bookshelf!" as well as from Donald Adamson in Napoleon at Elba. The author of historical fiction Bernard Cornwell has described the book as "[s]imply dynamite. ... [Napoleon was] a mass of contradictions and Roberts's book encompasses all the evidence to give a brilliant portrait of the man. The book, as it needs to be, is massive, yet the pace is brisk and it's never overwhelmed by the scholarly research, which was plainly immense ... Roberts suggests looking at Europe for the Emperor's monument, but this magnificent biography is not a bad place to start."

In announcing in 2013 that it would present a three-part television series based on Roberts's analysis of Napoleon's life and legacy, BBC Two declared in its press release that "Roberts sets out to shed new light on the emperor... an extraordinary, gifted military commander and a mesmeric leader whose private life was littered with disappointments and betrayals." The series has had mixed reviews. The Daily Telegraph declared it "unconvincing", saying that "there was no getting away from Roberts's regular lapses into hero-worship", and "Roberts's remarks on the refreshing qualities of dictatorship made me wonder if he had taken leave of his senses".

=== Churchill biography ===
In 2018 Roberts produced a biography of Churchill entitled Churchill: Walking with Destiny. Dovetailing with Roberts's previous work on the Second World War and its related major figures, the book received praise from a number of publications. For the Financial Times, Toni Barber wrote: "Anecdotes sparkle like gems throughout Roberts's book, an exhaustive but fluent text that draws on a wider range of sources than the typical Churchill biography." In The Observer, Andrew Rawnsley included the book among the 'Books of the Year' and said that "Roberts triumphed over my scepticism with his riveting account of the extraordinary life of the most remarkable individual to have lived at No 10."

For The New York Times, Richard Aldous commented: "All told, it must surely be the best single-volume biography of Churchill yet written." The National Book Review said that the book was "widely praised as the best single-volume biography of Winston Churchill ever written", and added that Roberts "draws on previously unavailable journals and notes for the robust, engrossing, and nuanced history of the great British leader."

== Journalism and lecturing ==
Roberts has created short works on a variety of subjects, his published columns appearing in popular periodicals such as The Daily Telegraph and The Spectator, amongst others. Since 2014 he has featured in several short lecture videos published by the American conservative advocacy group PragerU.

Since 1990 Roberts has addressed hundreds of institutional and academic audiences in many countries, including a lecture to the former US president George W. Bush at the White House. A monarchist, Roberts described Prince Philip upon his death in 2021 as "undoubtedly... one of the reasons that the overwhelming majority of Britons today feel blessed that their country is a monarchy". He has appeared on US television during royal funerals and weddings. He first came to prominence in the United States for his expert commentary on the funeral of Diana, Princess of Wales, in 1997, and he was later in a similar role during the CNN broadcast of the death of Queen Elizabeth The Queen Mother and on the wedding of Charles, Prince of Wales, and Camilla Parker Bowles. In 2003 he presented The Secrets of Leadership, a four-part history series on BBC Two about the secrets of leadership which looked at the different leadership styles of Churchill, Hitler, John F. Kennedy, and Martin Luther King Jr. Roberts is a director of the Harry Frank Guggenheim Foundation in New York City, a founder member of José Maria Aznar's Friends of Israel Initiative, and chaired the Hessell-Tiltman Award for Non-Fiction in 2010.

Roberts is a judge on the Elizabeth Longford Historical Biography Prize. Elected a Fellow of the Royal Society of Literature in 2001, he chaired the Conservative Party's Advisory Panel on the Teaching of History in Schools in 2005. He has also been elected a Fellow of the Napoleonic Institute and an Honorary Member of the International Churchill Society. He is a trustee of the Margaret Thatcher Archive Trust and of the Roberts Foundation. During the autumn of 2013, Roberts served as the inaugural Merrill Family visiting professor in history at Cornell University. He taught a course entitled "Great European Leaders of the 19th and 20th Centuries and their Influence on History." He has additionally spoken in many other American universities such as the University of Montana. In 2016 Roberts was elected a Fellow of the Royal Historical Society.

== Disputes and criticism ==
Although Roberts's 2006 work A History of the English-Speaking Peoples since 1900 won critical acclaim from some sections of the media, The Economist drew attention to some historical, geographical, and typographical errors, as well as presenting a generally scathing review. It referred to the work as "a giant political pamphlet larded with its author's prejudices". More generally, Reba Soffer described him in 2009 as "devoted ... to public, polemical conservatism as well as to historical revisionism". Roberts has been accused of celebrating western colonialism and imperialism in his books.

== Personal life ==
Roberts is divorced from his first wife, Camilla Henderson, with whom he had two children. Roberts is married to Susan Gilchrist, chief executive officer of the corporate communications firm Brunswick Group LLP and chairman of the South Bank Centre. Lord and Lady Roberts live in London.

Roberts has worked with think tank organisations such as the Centre for Policy Studies and the Centre for Social Cohesion. He has additionally maintained personal friendships with several British political and social figures such as David Cameron, Michael Gove, and Oliver Letwin. In February 2016 he was appointed president of the Cambridge University Conservative Association.

It was announced on 14 October 2022 in Boris Johnson's 2022 Political Honours that Roberts would be elevated to the peerage as a life baron. On 1 November 2022 he was created Baron Roberts of Belgravia, in the City of Westminster.

== See also ==
- List of alumni of Gonville and Caius College, Cambridge
- List of Wolfson History Prize winners

== Bibliography ==
=== Books ===
- The Holy Fox: A Biography of Lord Halifax, London: Weidenfeld & Nicolson, 1991, ISBN 0-297-81133-9; Head of Zeus, 2014 ISBN 978-1-781-85697-0.
- Eminent Churchillians, London: Weidenfeld & Nicolson, 1994, ISBN 978-0-297-81247-0; New York: Simon & Schuster, 1995, ISBN 978-0-671-76940-6.
- The Aachen Memorandum, London: Weidenfeld & Nicolson, 1995, ISBN 978-0-297-81619-5.
- Salisbury: Victorian Titan, London: Weidenfeld & Nicolson, 1999, ISBN 978-0-297-81713-0.
- The House of Windsor (A Royal History of England), London: Weidenfeld & Nicolson, 2000, ISBN 978-0-304-35406-1; Berkeley: University of California Press, 2000, ISBN 978-0-520-22803-0.
- Napoleon and Wellington, Weidenfeld & Nicolson, 2001, ISBN 978-0-297-64607-5; Napoleon and Wellington: The Battle of Waterloo and the Great Commanders Who Fought It, New York: Simon & Schuster, 2002, ISBN 9780743228329.
- Hitler and Churchill: Secrets of Leadership, Weidenfeld & Nicolson, 2003, ISBN 978-0-297-84330-6.
- What Might Have Been: Leading Historians on Twelve 'What Ifs' of History (editor), London: Weidenfeld & Nicolson, 2004, ISBN 978-0-297-84877-6.
- Waterloo: Napoleon's Last Gamble, London: HarperCollins, 2005, ISBN 978-0-007-19075-1; Waterloo: June 18, 1815. The Battle for Modern Europe, New York: Harper, 2005, ISBN 978-0-06-008866-8.
- A History of the English-Speaking Peoples since 1900, London: Weidenfeld & Nicolson, 2006, ISBN 978-0-297-85076-2; New York: Harper, 2007, ISBN 978-0-060-87598-5.
- Masters and Commanders: How Roosevelt, Churchill, Marshall and Alanbrooke Won the War in the West, London: Allen Lane, 2008, ISBN 978-0-7139-9969-3; Masters and Commanders: How Four Titans Won the War in the West, 1941–1945, New York: Harper, 2009, ISBN 978-0-06-122857-5. online
- The Art of War: Great Commanders of the Ancient and Medieval Worlds 1600 BC-AD 1600 (editor), London: Quercus, 2008 ISBN 978-1-847-24259-4; New York: Quercus, 2008, ISBN 978-1-84724-515-1.
- The Art of War: Great Commanders of the Modern World Since 1600 (editor), London: Quercus, 2009 ISBN 978-1-847-24260-0; New York: Quercus, 2009, ISBN 978-1-847-24516-8.
- The Storm of War: A New History of the Second World War, London: Allen Lane, 2009, ISBN 978-0-71399-970-9; New York: Harper, 2011 ISBN 978-0-061-22859-9. online
- Love, Tommy: Letters Home, from the Great War to the Present Day, London: Osprey Publishing, 2012, ISBN 978-1-849-08791-9.
- Napoleon the Great, London: Allen Lane, 2014 ISBN 978-1-846-14027-3; Napoleon: A Life, New York: Viking Press, 2014, ISBN 978-0-670-02532-9.
- Elegy: The First Day on the Somme, London: Head of Zeus, 2015, ISBN 978-1-784-08001-3.
- Churchill: Walking with Destiny, London: Allen Lane, 2018, ISBN 9780241205631; New York: Viking, 2018, ISBN 9781101980996.
- Leadership in War: Lessons from Those Who Made History, London: Allen Lane, 2019, ISBN 978-0-241-33599-4; Leadership in War: Essential Lessons from Those Who Made History, New York: Viking, 2019, ISBN 978-0-525-52238-6.
- George III: The Life and Reign of Britain's Most Misunderstood Monarch, Allen Lane, 2021, ISBN 978-0-241-41333-3; The Last King of America: The Misunderstood Reign of George III, New York: Viking, 2021, ISBN 978-1-984-87926-4). BBC Radio 4 Book of the Week, 4–8 October 2021, read by Ben Miller.
- The Chief: The Life of Lord Northcliffe Britain's Greatest Press Baron, London: Simon and Schuster, 2022, ISBN 978-1-398-50869-9.
- Conflict: The Evolution of Warfare from 1945 to Ukraine (with David Petraeus), London: William Collins, 2023, ISBN 978-0-008-56797-2; New York: Harper, 2023, ISBN 978-0-063-29313-7.
- Napoleon and His Marshals: Victory, Rivalry, Betrayal, London: Allen Lane, 2026, ISBN 978-0-241-71135-4; New York: Simon and Schuster, 2026, ISBN 978-1-668-08508-0.

=== Introductions, forewords and other contributions ===
- Virtual History (1997), One Essay
- What If? (1999), One Essay
- The Kings and Queens of England (2000), One Chapter
- The Railway King: A Biography of George Hudson (2001), Introduction
- Historian's Holiday (2001), Introduction
- What If? Volume 2 (2001), One Essay
- Protestant Island (2001), Introduction
- Spirit of England (2001), Introduction
- The Secret History of P.W.E. (2002), Introduction
- Rich Dust (2002), Introduction
- A History of the English-Speaking Peoples (2002), Introduction
- Spirit of England (2002), Preface
- Historian's Holiday (2002), Preface
- What Ifs of American History? (2003), One Essay
- The Multicultural Experiment (2003), One Chapter
- British Military Greats (2004), One Chapter
- Lives for Sale (2004), One Chapter
- Hitler's Death: Russia's Last Great Secret from the Files of the KGB (2005), Foreword
- Liberty and Livelihood (2005), One Chapter
- The Eagle's Last Triumph (2006), Introduction
- The Eagle's Last Triumph : Napoleon's Victory at Ligny, June 1815 (2006), Foreword
- Postcards from the Russian Revolution (2008), Introduction
- Postcards of Political Icons (2008), Introduction
- Postcards from Checkpoint Charlie (2008), Introduction
- A Week at Waterloo (2008), Introduction
- The Future of National Identity (2008), One Chapter
- Postcards from the Trenches (2008), Introduction
- Postcards from Utopia: The Art of Political Propaganda (2009), Introduction
- Postcards of Lost Royals (2009), Introduction
- Napoleon Bonaparte by Georges Lefevre (2010), Introduction
- Letters from Vicky: The Letters of Queen Victoria to Vicky, Empress of Germany 1858–1901 (2011), Introduction and Selection
- A History of the World in 100 Weapons (2011), Introduction

=== Critical studies and reviews of Roberts's work ===
Napoleon the Great

- Adonis, Andrew (21 November 2014). "Boney's bungles". New Statesman. 143 (5237): 45.

Orders of precedence in the United Kingdom
Preceded by The Lord Leong	Gentlemen; Baron Roberts of Belgravia	Followed by The Lord Swire
