= Thomas Boyce =

Thomas Boyce may refer to:

- Tommy Boyce (1939–1994), American songwriter
- Thomas Boyce (dramatist) (died 1793), English cleric and dramatist
- W. Thomas Boyce, American pediatrician

== See also ==
- Boyce (disambiguation)
