= Arthur Bull =

Arthur Bull may refer to:

- Arthur Bull (cricketer) (1892–1965), English cricketer
- Arthur Gilbert Bull (1890–1963), England rugby international player
- Ted Bull (Arthur William Bull, 1898–1967), Australian Olympic rower
