= Napoleon: A Life =

2014 book

Napoleon the Great (UK); Napoleon: A Life (US)
- First edition
- Author: Andrew Roberts
- Language: English
- Subject: Napoleon
- Published: 2014
- Publisher: Viking Press
- Publication place: United Kingdom
- Pages: 976
- ISBN: 9780143127857

Napoleon the Great, also known as Napoleon: A Life in the United States, is a non-fiction book authored by British historian and journalist Andrew Roberts.

== Biography of Napoleon ==
In 2014, Roberts wrote Napoleon the Great (the US edition is titled Napoleon: A Life), which was awarded the 2015 Los Angeles Times Book Prize for best biography. In this biography, Roberts seeks to evoke Napoleon's tremendous energy, both physical and intellectual, and the attractiveness of his personality, even to his enemies. The book argues against many long-held historical opinions, including, according to him of the alleged myth of a great romance with Joséphine de Beauharnais, although his views on the subject differ from those of other academics such as Jean Tulard (Sorbonne University) and Thierry Lentz (Fondation Napoléon). She took a lover immediately after their marriage, as Roberts shows, and Napoleon in fact had three times as many mistresses as he acknowledged. Roberts goes through fifty-three of Napoleon's sixty battlefields, and he additionally evaluates a gigantic new French edition of Napoleon's letters, aiming to create a complete re-evaluation of the man.

Like The Storm of War, Roberts's life of Napoleon received critical praise from a wide range of publications. In October 2014, journalist Jeremy Jennings wrote for Standpoint that "Napoleon could have had few biographers more dedicated to their subject." Jennings additionally labelled the book a "richly detailed and sure-footed reappraisal of the man, his achievements—and failures—and the extraordinary times in which he lived". The book earned the Prix du Jury des Grands Prix de la Fondation Napoléon for 2014, an award given by the historical organisation Fondation Napoléon.

Praise additionally came from fellow historian Jay Winik: "With his customary flair and keen historical eye, Andrew Roberts has delivered the goods again. This could well be the best single volume biography of Napoleon in English for the last four decades. A tour de force that belongs on every history-lover's bookshelf!" Author of historical fiction Bernard Cornwell has described the book as "[s]imply dynamite. ... [Napoleon was] a mass of contradictions and Roberts's book encompasses all the evidence to give a brilliant portrait of the man. The book, as it needs to be, is massive, yet the pace is brisk and it's never overwhelmed by the scholarly research, which was plainly immense ... Roberts suggests looking at Europe for the Emperor's monument, but this magnificent biography is not a bad place to start."

In announcing in 2013 that it would present a three-part television series based on Roberts's analysis of Napoleon's life and legacy, BBC Two declared in its press release that "Roberts sets out to shed new light on the emperor... an extraordinary, gifted military commander and a mesmeric leader whose private life was littered with disappointments and betrayals." The series has had mixed reviews. The Daily Telegraph declared it "unconvincing", saying that "there was no getting away from Roberts's regular lapses into hero-worship", and "Roberts's remarks on the refreshing qualities of dictatorship made me wonder if he had taken leave of his senses".
