= Charles Coates =

Charles Coates may refer to:

- Charles Coates (sportsman) (1857–1922), English clergyman and all round sportsman
- Charles E. Coates (1866–1939), American academic, chemist, and player and coach of American football
- Charles Coates (footballer) (1912–1991), English footballer
- Charles Coates (priest) (c. 1746–1813), English cleric and antiquarian
