= Benedict Chapman =

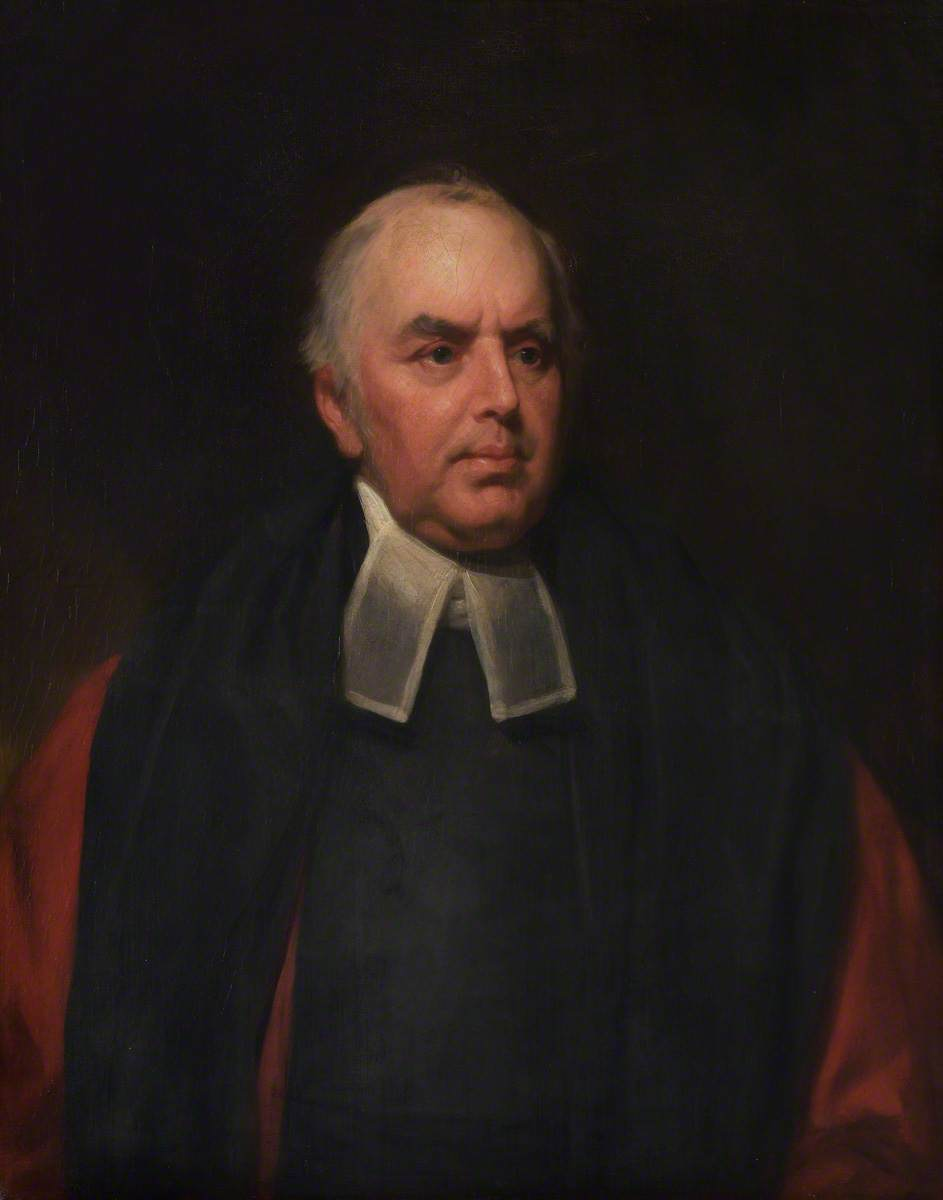
Benedict Chapman by Thomas Phillips

Benedict Chapman (January 1769, Norwich? – 23 October 1852) was a college master at the University of Cambridge and an Anglican rector.

After education at Dr. Parr's school in Norwich, Chapman matriculated at age 17 on 10 May 1787 at Gonville and Caius College, Cambridge and graduated there B.A. (6th Wrangler) in 1792, M.A. in 1795 and D.D. (Lit Reg.) in 1840. At Gonville and Caius College he was made Fellow from 1792 to 1820, Dean in 1797, Steward in 1799, Bursar from 1805 to 1807, and College Master from 1839 to 1852. In 1794 he was Usher and Second Master at the Perse School. As an Anglican, Chapman was ordained a deacon (at Ely) on 15 June 1794 and a priest on 22 May 1796. From 1818 to 1852 he was Rector of Ashdon, Essex. He gave £1000 to the College Building Fund and in his will made a bequest to the Norrisian Professorship of Divinity.

== Offices held ==
Academic offices
Preceded by Martin Davy	Master of Gonville and Caius College, University of Cambridge; 1839–1852	Succeeded by Edwin Guest
