= John Loveday (antiquary) =

English antiquarian (1711–1789)

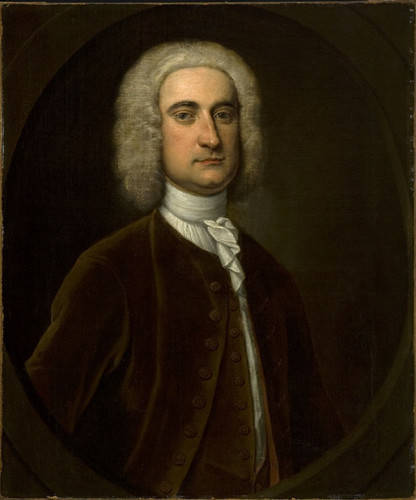
Portrait of John Loveday by Thomas Gibson, 1739

John Loveday (1711–1789) was an English antiquarian. With the publication of his journals, he is now known for descriptions of English country houses.

== Life ==
He was only son of Thomas Loveday of Caversham, then in Oxfordshire, and Feenes Manor, Berkshire, by Sarah, daughter of William Lethieullier, a Turkey merchant of Clapham, Surrey. After attending Reading school he matriculated at Magdalen College, Oxford as a gentleman-commoner on 13 February 1728, and graduated B.A., in 1731, M.A. in 1734. As an undergraduate he developed a taste for archaeology.

Loveday lived at Caversham, and with inherited money collected pictures, books, and antiquities. He purchased Dr. John Ward's manuscripts and coins, and founded a family library at Williamscote, near Banbury. He was well connected among the literati.

Loveday died on 16 May 1789.

== Works ==
Loveday wrote papers under various pseudonyms in the Gentleman's Magazine, and his "Observations upon Shrines", a paper read before the Society of Antiquaries of London on 12 December 1754, was printed in Archæologia. His annotations on Anthony Wood's Athenæ Oxonienses were used by Philip Bliss in his edition. Charles Coates used Loveday's notes on Reading in his own History and Antiquities of Reading (1802).

In 1890 Loveday's great-grandson, John Edward Taylor Loveday, printed for the Roxburghe Club his Diary of a Tour in 1732 through parts of England, Wales, Ireland, and Scotland.

== Family ==
Loveday married:

1. in 1739 Anna Maria (d. 1743), daughter of William Goodwin of Arlescote, Warwickshire, by whom he had a son John the younger (see below);
2. in 1745, Dorothy (d. 1755), daughter of Harrington Bagshaw of Bromley, Kent; and
3. in 1756, Penelope (d. 1801), daughter of Arthur Forrest of Jamaica, by whom he had a son Arthur (d. 1827), who became a clergyman, and three daughters.

John Loveday the younger (1742–1809), born on 22 November 1742, was educated at Reading school. On 5 February 1760 he matriculated at Oxford as a gentleman-commoner of Magdalen College, graduating B.C.L. in 1766, and D.C.L. in 1771. He was admitted an advocate in Doctors' Commons on 4 November 1771, but ceased to practise after increasing his property by a marriage in 1777 with his ward Anne, only daughter and heiress of William Taylor Loder of Williamscote. Loveday then sold the Caversham property, and lived at Williamscote, where he died on 4 March 1809, leaving four sons and a daughter. He assisted Richard Chandler in the preparation of Marmora Oxoniensia, 1763, and compiled the index. He contributed papers on local antiquities to the Gentleman's Magazine. A few years before his death he presented the Ward manuscripts to the British Museum.

== Notes ==
Attribution

This article incorporates text from a publication now in the public domain: Lee, Sidney, ed. (1893). "Loveday, John". Dictionary of National Biography. Vol. 34. London: Smith, Elder & Co.
