= Ingoldisthorpe =

Village in Norfolk, England

Coordinates: 52.86438°N 0.50759°E

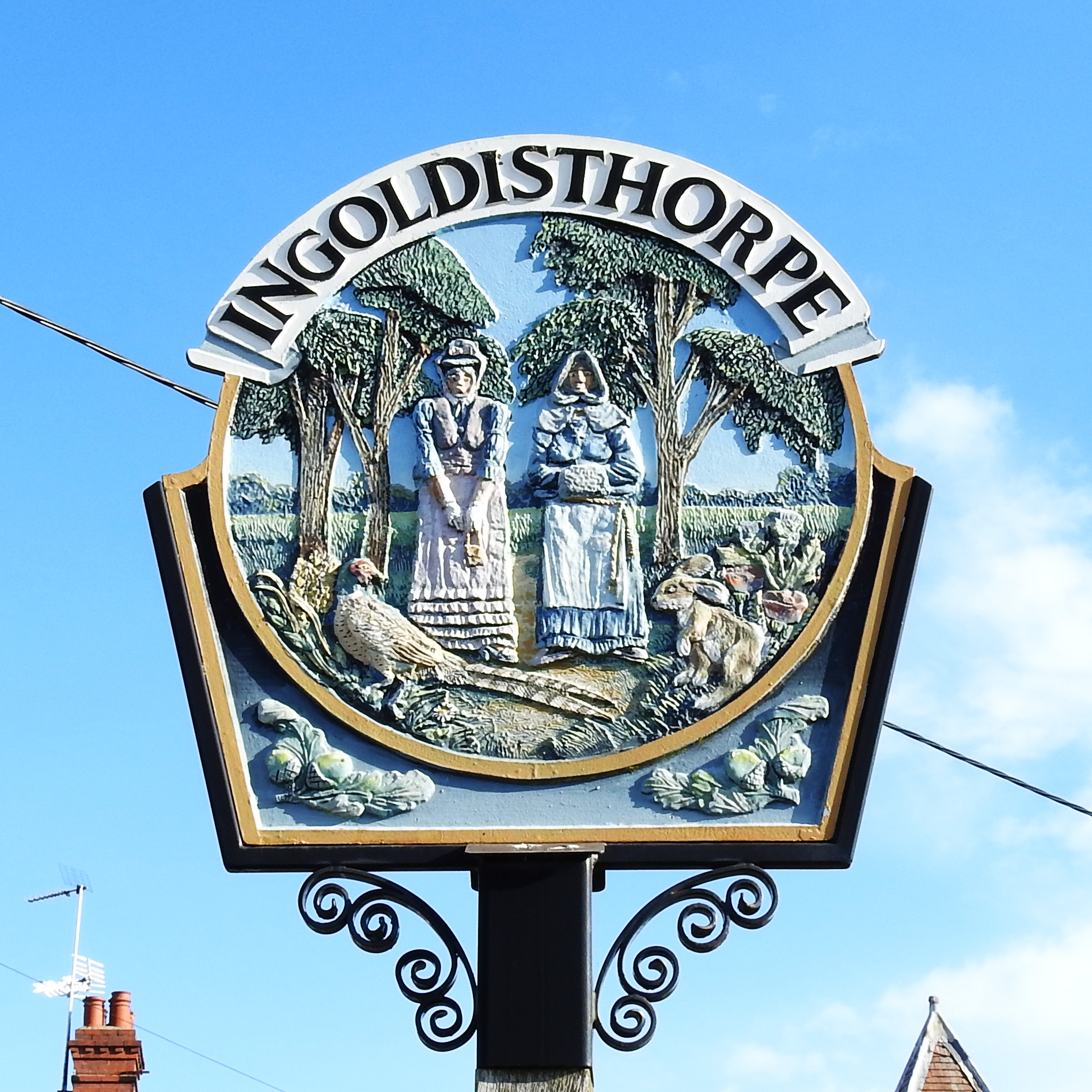
- Ingoldisthorpe Village Sign

- Location within Norfolk
- Area: 4.35 sq mi (11.3 km^{2})
- Population: 841 (2021 census)
  - Density: 193/sq mi (75/km^{2})
- OS grid reference: TF 689 326
- Civil parish: Ingoldisthorpe
- District: King's Lynn and West Norfolk
- Shire county: Norfolk
- Region: East
- Country: England
- Sovereign state: United Kingdom
- Post town: KING'S LYNN
- Postcode district: PE31
- Dialling code: 01485
- UK Parliament: North West Norfolk

Ingoldisthorpe is a village and civil parish in the English county of Norfolk.

Ingoldisthorpe is located approximately 9 miles (14 km) north-east of King's Lynn and 37 miles (60 km) north-west of Norwich.

== History ==
Ingoldisthorpe's name is of Viking origin and derives from the Old Norse for Ingjaldr's farmstead.

In the Domesday Book, Ingoldisthorpe is recorded as a settlement of 36 households in the hundred of Smethdon. In 1086, the village was divided between the East Anglian estates of Peter de Valognes and Roger, son of Rainard.

Ingoldisthorpe Hall was built in 1757 in the Corinthian and Rococo architectural styles.

Between 1959 and 1991, a Royal Observer Corps post was located in the parish to detect incoming Soviet nuclear attacks.

In both 1961 and 2013, a reported haunting has been sited in Ingoldisthorpe of a floating lamp. This is the supposedly the lamp of a Victorian Rector of St. Michael's Church who suspected his wife of infidelity.

== Geography ==
According to the 2021 census, Ingoldisthorpe has a population of 841 people which shows a decrease from the 849 people listed in the 2011 census.

== St. Michael's Church ==
Ingoldisthorpe's parish church is dedicated to Saint Michael and dates from the Fourteenth Century. St. Michael's is located on Manor Close and has been Grade II listed since 1953. The church holds Sunday service once a month.

St. Michael's holds a font dating from the Twelfth Century and some brass memorials from the Seventeenth Century to Thomas and Agnes Bigge. The church also holds several stained-glass windows designed by the workshop of Michael O'Connor (depicting Biblical scenes with a memorial to Thomas J. Beckett who died in 1863 in New Brunswick) as well as a depiction of the works of mercy by Heaton, Butler and Bayne. The majority of this glass was installed during the Victorian restoration of the church by George Pritchett.

== Governance ==
Ingoldisthorpe is part of the electoral ward of Dersingham for local elections and is part of the district of King's Lynn and West Norfolk.

The village's national constituency is North West Norfolk which has been represented by the Conservative's James Wild MP since 2019.

== Notable residents ==
- Arthur Bull (1892-1965), cricketer
- William Hoste (1780-1828), naval officer
- Martin Davy (1763-1839), physician and academic
- Thomas Ingoldsthorpe (d.1291), bishop

== War Memorial ==
Ingoldisthorpe's war memorial is a marble plaque inside St. Michael's Church which lists the following names for the First World War:

Rank	Name	Unit	Date of death	Burial/Commemoration
LSgt.	William E. Cross	10th Bn., West Yorkshire Regiment	23 Apr. 1917	Arras Memorial
Pte.	Albert J. Marrington	VII Bn., Army Cyclist Corps	23 Mar. 1918	Arras Memorial
Pte.	Horace B. Emmerson	6th Bn., Bedfordshire Regiment	16 Nov. 1916	Thiepval Memorial
Pte.	George Fenn	4th Bn., The Buffs	5 Nov. 1918	St. Michael's Churchyard
Pte.	Walter Cross	8th Bn., East Yorkshire Regiment	17 Nov. 1916	Thiepval Memorial
Pte.	George Athow	8th Bn., Norfolk Regiment	8 Aug. 1916	Ploegsteert Memorial
Pte.	Thomas Martins	9th Bn., Norfolk Regt.	28 Mar. 1918	Étaples Military Cemetery
