= Churchill: Walking with Destiny =

2018 book by Andrew Roberts

- First edition hardcover image
- Author: Andrew Roberts
- Language: English
- Subject: Winston Churchill
- Published: 2018
- Publisher: Allen Lane
- Publication place: United Kingdom
- Pages: 1,105
- ISBN: 9780241205631

Churchill: Walking with Destiny is a non-fiction book authored by British historian and journalist Andrew Roberts. Viking Press published it within the United States in 2018, while Allen Lane published it within the United Kingdom.

Dovetailing with Roberts' previous work on the Second World War and its related major figures, examples being The Storm of War, the book received praise from a number of publications. Reviewers have viewed the one-volume biography as one of the best works on Winston Churchill, a statesman best known for serving as Prime Minister of the United Kingdom during the Second World War, and have particularly cited the use of newly available documentary material by Roberts in its writing.

Specifically, positive reviews appeared in the publications City Journal, The Jewish Chronicle, National Review, and The Sunday Times.

== Background and contents ==
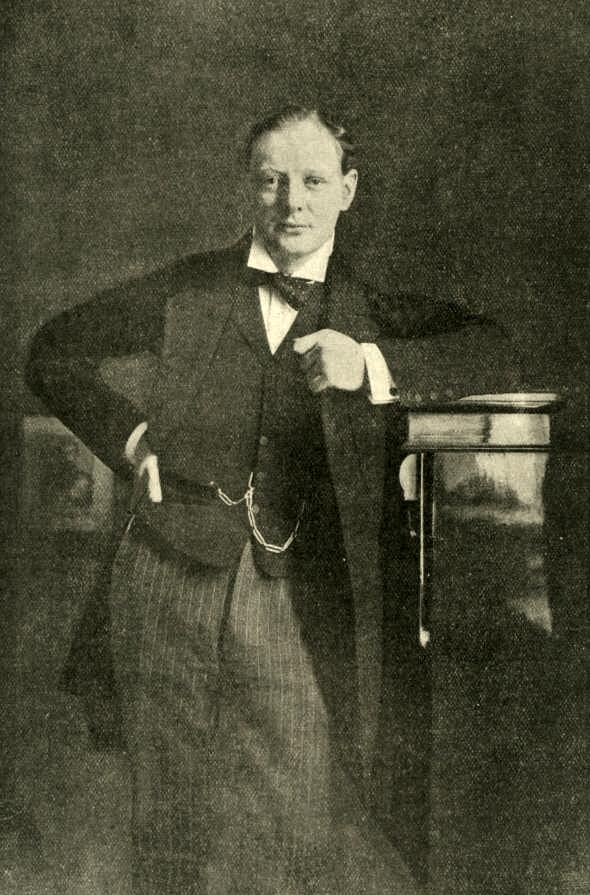
Churchill is photographed as a Member of Parliament in 1904.

Given the author's longstanding history of writing about the early 20th century, one commentator opined that: "Churchill’s world and its environs have been so richly and perspicaciously documented by Roberts for decades that the real oddity would be his reaching the end of a fruitful career as a historian of vast events and great men with no such tome to his credit". In preparation for the book, Roberts accessed newly open material previously unavailable to earlier writers. For example, the private diary kept by King George VI during World War II became as a resource given Queen Elizabeth II's assent for its use for historical posterity.

Roberts describes Churchill's background and particularly notes the sadness that Churchill experienced as a child. Ignored by his active father and subject to an uncompassionate mother, Roberts writes, the young Churchill grows up in a general atmosphere of loneliness, despite his multiple attempts to write to his parents. While born into an aristocratic family at Blenheim Palace, the complex being built an illustrious duke ancestor, Churchill lamented missed opportunities and particularly felt pressured given his half-American and half-British parentage, with his mother and her relatives dismissed as crass upstarts. Roberts argues that the issues endured in Churchill's childhood endowed the statesman with a strong sense of personal character possibly unlikely to have come about were Churchill either all British or a complete American expatriate.

Serving in the First World War gave Churchill the opportunity to live out his taste for glory, according to Roberts. Churchill particularly wrote to Margot Asquith in 1915 that he "would not be out of this glorious, delicious war for anything." The statesmen's early life involves a variety of military and journalistic triumphs as well as certain misadventures in different nations such as Cuba, India, and South Africa, Roberts writes, that leads Churchill into the British Parliament at age twenty-five. As an example of how Churchill's psychology became shaped by varied experiences, Roberts cites the experience of dealing with Islamic fundamentalist militants as a young soldier on India's northwest frontier as preparation to understand Adolf Hitler's fanaticism.

As a young man, Churchill developed a particular type of personality involving a certain psychological foresight as well as an exaggerated sense of ideals and general life purposes, according to Roberts. The author describes Churchill's photographic memory and notes that, while the statesman bemoaned the inability to achieve an advanced higher education, this allowed for Churchill to become a self-educated master of the English language, particularly works of poetry. Roberts condemns what he sees as later misinterpretations of Churchill's background and psyche, the author remarking that Churchill is best thought of as both a dreamer and as an ambitious man of his time.

== Reception ==
Journalist Stephen Pollard wrote for The Jewish Chronicle lauding the "simply wonderful book", praising Roberts for having written something so "stirring yet thought-provoking" that it constituted "the most superb one-volume biography I have ever read— of anyone." Pollard additionally remarked that since "Roberts manages something" previously "thought impossible" in creating "a new, ground-breaking portrait of the man whom many consider to be the greatest ever Englishman", Churchill: Walking with Destiny "will be regarded as a classic for generations to come". National Review published a supportive review by commentator Tracy Lee Simmons. Praising the "massive book", Simmons stated that Roberts had managed "a tour de force of scrupulous selection and astute appraisal" that stands out "in a field where the competition has been crowded and stiff."

Additional praise has come from publications such as The Sunday Times, the newspaper's review stating that Roberts' style "bursts with character" and "humour". Historian Barry Strauss wrote for City Journal that the "brilliant" work "is not only learned and sagacious but also thrilling and fun". Strauss additionally commented, "Roberts writes with authority and confidence."

== See also ==
- Allies at War by Tim Bouverie (2025)
- The Second World War by Antony Beevor (2012).
- Inferno: The World at War, 1939-1945 by Max Hastings (2011).
- The Storm of War by Andrew Roberts (2009).
