= The Aachen Memorandum =

1995 novel by Andrew Roberts

The Aachen Memorandum is a 1995 thriller novel by Andrew Roberts. The author has described it as "a dystopian vision of what Britain might turn into if it became a minor satrapy of a vast protectionist, illiberal anti-American, politically correct EU."

== Plot ==
The novel presupposes a referendum to have taken place in the United Kingdom in 2015, on whether the country should join a United States of Europe (a development of the European Union) as part of a Treaty of Aachen. The referendum gives a narrow majority to supporters of the Treaty (51.86% to 48.14%). Thirty years later the book's anti-hero, the historian Horatio Lestocq, a member of All Souls College at Oxford University, researching the referendum for a series of articles in The Times, comes across evidence revealing that the referendum was rigged by a pro-European elite. After a series of violent events, including murder and an attempt on the life of the émigré William Mountbatten-Windsor (son of "the late ex-King Charles III", and now King of New Zealand), Lestocq's eventual exposure of the referendum fraud results in the restoration of an independent United Kingdom, and he is rewarded, after the repeal of the European Union's 'Classlessness Directive', with a baronetcy and the editorship of The Times.

The book makes satirical predictions (from its 1995 perspective) of the future of a number of real-life people. These include a group arrested in 2016 as being members of the underground Anti-Federalist Movement, among whom are mentioned "Matthew d'Ancona, the former editor of The Times, two former cabinet ministers, Hywel Williams and Iain Duncan Smith, the [...] broadcaster Dr. Niall Ferguson [and] Michael Gove of the European Broadcasting Corporation." John Redwood, having escaped from Pentonville Prison, is in 2045 the head of the 'Free British Office' in Oslo.

== Anticipations of Brexit referendum ==
The book contains some anticipations of the actual 2016 Brexit referendum. In the book's account of the fictional 2015 campaign, leaders of the business sector predict "mass unemployment in the event of a "No" victory", and "the chattering classes endorse the "Yes" campaign en masse." The 'Yes' campaign is "well-funded" by the British government, the London region votes clearly to join the Union, and the north-east of England votes against by 56% to 44%. However the author anticipated 'leave' votes from Northern Ireland and Scotland, unlike the 2016 vote.

== Opinions ==
The Socialist Review, the journal of the Socialist Workers Party, reviewed the book in 1996 and described the author as "a right wing Thatcherite historian", concluding that "any European superstate in 2045 [would] be built on the backs of slashing welfare provision and attacking workers' organisation and will be run by the Thatcherites Roberts so much admires."

The writer Stephen Powell has characterized the book as an attempt "to express Euroscepticism at a time when a resurgent Labour Party under Tony Blair, then [in 1995] in opposition, was planning a much more pro-European foreign policy." Stephen Fielding, professor of Political History at the University of Nottingham, suggests that the book "reflected the fears of one of Margaret Thatcher's bigger fans – and keen supporter of Michael Portillo's ambitions to replace [John] Major – that the people's patriotic voice will simply be over-ridden on Brussels' march towards super-state-dom."

After the actual referendum in 2016, the author wrote that the book "attempted to be a whodunnit, a futuristic dystopia, a thriller and a comedy all at once, and failed so badly on all levels that I now beg friends not to read it. Nonetheless, in the novel, there is another referendum in 2045 when Britain votes to leave, so when I'm 82 I'll know whether I'm the Tory Nostradamus."
