= Edwin Guest =

19th-century British antiquarian

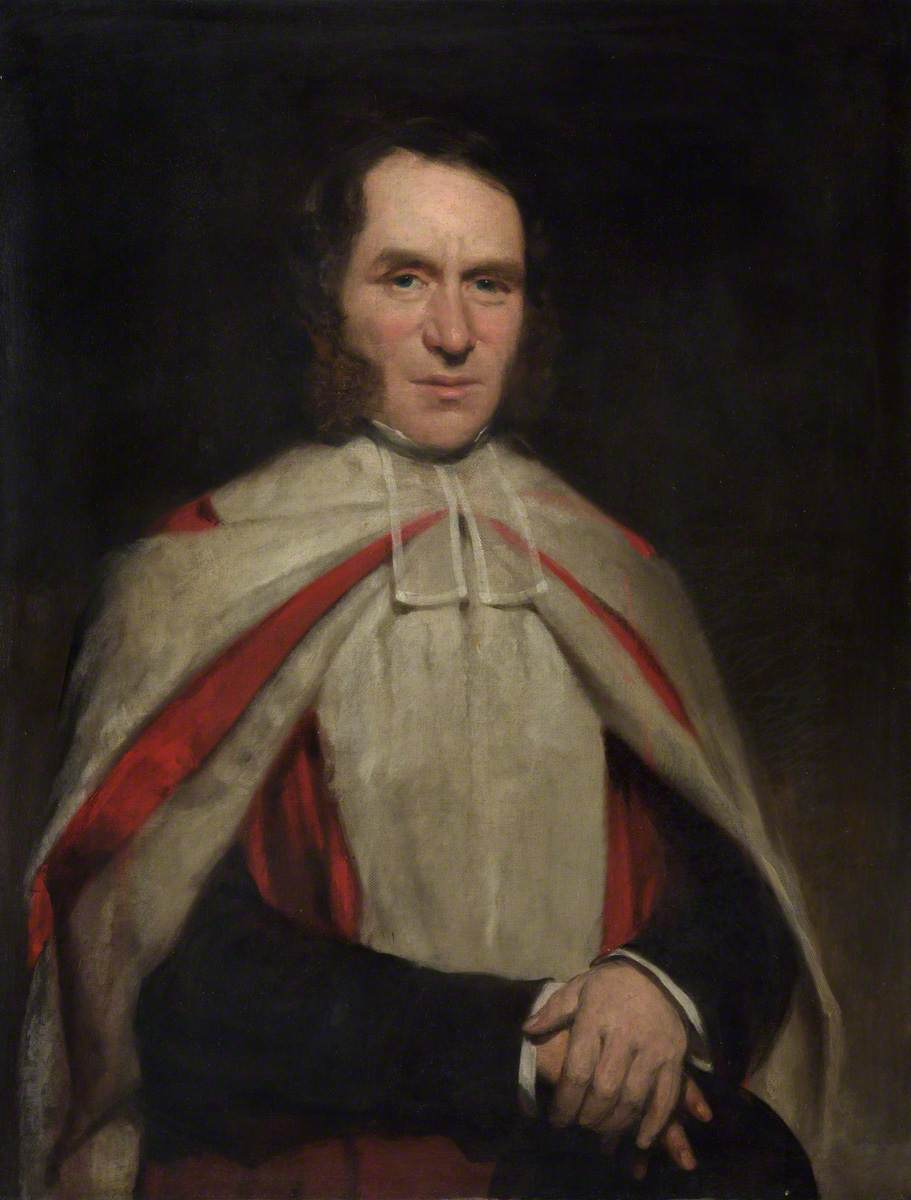
Edwin Guest by John Watson-Gordon

Edwin Guest FRS (10 September 1800 – 23 November 1880) was an English antiquary.

He was educated at King Edward's School, Birmingham, and at Gonville and Caius College, Cambridge, where he graduated as eleventh wrangler, subsequently becoming a fellow of his college. Called to the bar in 1828, he devoted himself, after some years of legal practice, to antiquarian and literary research.

In 1838 he published his exhaustive 2-volume History of English Rhythms, which George Saintsbury, in his own A History of English Prosody, calls "the best-known and (with all its faults) by far the best book existing on the subject." Guest also wrote a very large number of papers on Roman-British history, which, together with a mass of fresh material for a history of early Britain, were published posthumously under the editorship of Dr Stubbs under the title Origines Celticae (1883). Guest was an instrumental figure in founding the second incarnation of the Philological Society of London in 1842. In 1852 Guest was elected master of Caius College, becoming LL.D. in the following year, and in 1854-1855 he was vice-chancellor of Cambridge University. Guest was a fellow of the Royal Society, and an honorary member of the Society of Antiquaries of London.

== Offices held ==
Academic offices
| Preceded by Benedict Chapman | Master of Gonville and Caius College, University of Cambridge; 1852-1880 | Succeeded by Norman Macleod Ferrers |
