= Reba Soffer =

American historian

Reba N. Soffer (born 1934) is an American historian. She is Professor Emeritus of History at California State University, Northridge.

== Life ==
Soffer was born in 1934. She gained a B.A. from Brooklyn College in 1955 and a M.A. from Wellesley College in 1957. She gained her Ph.D. from Radcliffe College in 1962.

== Works ==
- Ethics and Society in England: The Revolution in the Social Sciences, 1870–1914. University of California Press, 1978.
- Discipline and Power: The University, History, and the Making of an English Elite, 1870–1930. Stanford University Press, 1995.
- History, Historians, and Conservatism in Britain and America: From the Great War to Thatcher and Reagan. Oxford University Press, 2008. ISBN 9780199208111
