= Richard Aldous =

British historian and biographer

Richard Aldous is a British historian and biographer based at Bard College in Upstate New York, where he is Eugene Meyer Distinguished Professor of History.

Born in Essex, Aldous was educated at the University of Cambridge. In 2006 he was made Head of the School of History and Archives in University College Dublin. Aldous has written books about Malcolm Sargent, Harold Macmillan, a twin-biography of Benjamin Disraeli and William Gladstone, a study of Ronald Reagan and Margaret Thatcher's political relationship, a book on JFK's treasury secretary C. Douglas Dillon, as well as a biography of Arthur M. Schlesinger Jr. Since 2010 he is the Eugene Meyer Professor at Bard College, where he has served as Chair of the Faculty Senate. He is a Contributing Editor for The American Interest, a founding member of the editorial team at American Purpose magazine, and host of the Bookstack podcast. He has written for newspapers such as the Wall Street Journal, the Washington Post, and the New York Times, and appeared on CNN, Fox News, PBS, RTÉ and the BBC. He was the Spectrum News/NY1 Royal Expert for coverage of the funeral of Queen Elizabeth II and the coronation of King Charles III.

== Works ==
- Tunes Of Glory: The Life of Malcolm Sargent. Hutchinson, 2001, ISBN 1-4481-3694-6.
- Macmillan, Eisenhower And The Cold War, Four Courts Press, 2005, ISBN 1-85182-923-7.
- The Lion and the Unicorn: Gladstone vs Disraeli. Hutchinson/W. W. Norton, 2006, ISBN 1-4481-3817-5.
- Great Irish Speeches. Quercus, 2007, ISBN 1-84724-658-3.
- Reagan and Thatcher. The Difficult Relationship. Hutchinson/W. W. Norton, 2012, ISBN 0-09-192608-4.
- Tony Ryan: Ireland's Aviator. Gill & Macmillan, 2013, ISBN 978-0717157815.
- Schlesinger: The Imperial Historian. W. W. Norton, 2017, ISBN 0-393-24470-9.
- The Dillon Era: Douglas Dillon in the Eisenhower, Kennedy, and Johnson Administration. McGill–Queen's University Press, 2023, ISBN 978-0228018872.
- Harold Macmillan and Britain's World Role (edited with Sabine Lee). Macmillan, 1995, ISBN 978-0333630532.
- Harold Macmillan: Aspects of a Political Life (edited with Sabine Lee). Macmillan, 1999, ISBN 978-0333713730.
- Diplomacy & Statecraft, Volume 33, Issue 1, 2022 (edited with Nigel Ashton): David Reynolds: Studies in Competitive Co-operation.
