= Arthur Bull (cricketer) =

English cricketer

Personal information
- Nationality: British (English)
- Born: 23 January 1892 Hatton Park, Wellingborough, Northants, England
- Died: 18 December 1965 (aged 73) Ingoldisthorpe, Norfolk, England

Sport
- Sport: Cricket; Lawn bowls
- Club: Northamptonshire CCC; Wellinborough BC

Arthur Herbert Bull was an English cricketer and lawn bowler who played for Northamptonshire from 1913 to 1924 and was club captain in the 1923 and 1924 seasons. He was born in Wellingborough on 23 January 1892 and died in Ingoldisthorpe, Norfolk on 18 December 1965. He appeared in 36 first-class matches as a righthanded batsman who scored 538 runs with a highest score of 44.

He won the English National pairs title in 1932 with his brother George, bowling for the Wellinborough Bowls Club.
