= Richard Watson (Royalist priest) =

Watson, Richard (1611/12–1685), Church of England clergyman

The Reverend Doctor Richard Watson
- Rector of Pewsey
- Diocese: Salisbury
- Appointed: September 1662

Personal details
- Born: 1611–12
- Died: 1684–5 (aged 72–74)
- Denomination: Anglican
- Profession: Academic; Priest
- Education: Gonville and Caius College, Cambridge

Richard Watson (1611–12 – 1684–5) was a Church of England clergyman, Royalist divine, controversialist, and poet.

== Life ==
Richard Watson, son of William Watson, merchant, was born in the parish of St. Katharine Cree, London, in 1612, and is said to have studied for five years in the Merchant Taylors' School under Mr. Augur, though his name does not occur in the Registers. On 22 December 1628 he was admitted a sizar of Gonville and Caius College, Cambridge. He proceeded BA in 1632, commenced MA in 1636, and was elected a junior fellow of his college in September 1636. From 1636 to 1642 he was headmaster of the Perse Grammar School at Cambridge. He held the college offices of lecturer in rhetoric in 1639, Greek lecturer in 1642, and Hebrew lecturer in 1643. Being a zealous defender of the Church of England, he preached a sermon touching schism (Cambridge, 1642, 4to) at St. Mary's, the university church, in 1642, and, as this was highly offensive to the Presbyterians, he was ejected from his fellowship and his school. Afterwards, "to avoid their barbarities", he withdrew to France, and was patronised at Paris by Sir Richard Browne, Clerk of His Majesty's Council, and for some months he officiated in that gentleman's oratory or chapel, where he frequently argued with the opposite party concerning the visibility of their church. Subsequently, he became chaplain to Ralph, Lord Hopton, in whose service he continued until that nobleman's death in 1652, being then "accounted one of the prime sufferers of the English clergy beyond the seas". He afterwards resided at Caen.

At the Restoration he was re-elected fellow of Caius College, and he demanded his original seniority, 30l. a year as compensation for his sequestered fellowship from 1644, and 3l. a year for the rent of his rooms from the same date. The college refused to grant this demand, but allowed him 10l. a year "for the present". Later, on 5 July 1662, he was allowed the value of his fellowship for the two years and a half during which it was vacant after his ejection, and some allowance was made for rent of his rooms "out of respect to his deserts and sufferings". On 29 April 1662 Watson, who at that time was one of the chaplains to James, Duke of York, was created by diploma D.D. of the University of Oxford. In September 1662 he was presented to the rectory of Pewsey, Wiltshire. He was collated to the prebend of Warminster Ecclesia in the church of Sarum on 29 March 1666; was appointed master of the hospital at Heytesbury, Wiltshire, in 1671; and on 19 December 1671 he was installed in the prebend of Bitton in the church of Sarum. He died on 13 January 1684–5. Wood says he was "a good scholar, but vain and conceited".

== Works ==
Besides sermons and several copies of Latin verse, Watson published:

1. Regicidium Judaicum; or a discourse about the Jewes crucifying … their King. With an appendix … upon the late murder of … Charles the First, delivered in a sermon [on John xix. 14, 15] at the Hague, before His Majestie of Great Britaine [Charles II], The Hague, 1649, 4to.
2. Akolouthos, or a second faire warning to take heed of the Scotish Discipline, in vindication of the first (which the … Bishop of London Derrie published ann. 1649) against a schismatical and seditious reviewer, R[obert] B[aillie of] G[lasgow], The Hague, 1651, 2 pts. 4to.
3. Historicall Collections of Ecclesiastick Affairs in Scotland, and Politic related to them, London, 1657, 12mo.
4. The Panegyrike, and the Storme, two poetike libells by Ed. Waller, vassáll to the Usurper, answered [in verse] by more faythfull subjects to his sacred Maty K. Charles II (anon.), sine loco, 1659, 4to.
5. The Royal Votarie laying downe Sword and Shield, to take vp Prayer and Patience; the devout practice of his Sacred Maiesty K. Charles I in his Solitvdes & Sufferings. In part metrically paraphrased, Caen, 1660, 8vo.
6. Discipline: (1) A fair Warning to take heed of the same, by Dr. Bramhall, &c.; (2) A Review of Dr. Bramhall … his fair Warning, &c.; (3) A second fair Warning, in vindication of the first against the seditious Reviewer, The Hague, 1661, 4to.
7. Effata Regalia: Aphorisms divine, moral, politic, scatter'd in the Books, Speeches, Letters, &c., of King Charles the First, London, 1661, 12mo.
8. Epistolaris Diatribe, una de Fide Rationali, altera de Gratia Salutari; his subnexa est, De voluntate etiam ab ultimo dictamine intellectus liberata, Dissertatio, London, 1661, 8vo.
9. An English translation of The Ancient Liberty of the Britannick Church, by Isaac Basire, London, 1661, 8vo. To this he added Three Chapters concerning the Priviledges of the Britannick Church, selected out of a Latin Manuscript, entituled Catholicon Romanus Pacificus. Written by F. J. Barnes, of the Order of St. Benedict. Basire's Latin work Diatriba de Antiqua Ecclesiarum Britannicarum Antiquitate was published at Bruges (1656, 8vo) under the editorship of Watson.
10. Ludio Paræneticus; Orationes olim habitæ Cantabrigiæ, in solemni Professione Filiorum, Artium Candidatorum, published with the college and university exercises of Aquila Cruso, London, 1665, 8vo.
11. A fuller Answer to Elimas the Sorcerer; or to the most material part (of a feign'd memoriall) towards the discovery of the Popish plot, with modest reflections upon a pretended declaration (of the late Dutchess) [of York] for changing her religion, published by M. Maimbourg, &c. In a letter addressed to Mr. Thomas Jones [the author of Elymas], London, 1683, fol.
12. The right reverend Dr. John Cosin, late Lord Bishop of Durham, his Opinion (when Dean of Peterborough and in exile) for communicating rather with Geneva than Rome: Also what slender authority, if any, the English Psalms, in rhime and metre, have ever had for the publick Use they have obtained in our Churches, and a short historical deduction of the original design and sacrilegious progress of metrical psalms, London, 1684, 8vo; reprinted with a different title-page, 1685.

He also edited E. Duncon's treatise De adoratione Dei versus altare, 1660, 12mo.

== Sources ==
- Addit. MS. 5883, f. 48;
- Bibliotheca Anglo-Poetica, p. 865;
- Bodleian Catalogue;
- Carter's Cambridge, pp. 129, 135, 137;
- Foster's Alumni Oxonienses 1500–1714, p. 1583;
- Kennett's Register, pp. 228, 229, 371, 458, 571, 657;
- Lowndes's Bibliographer's Manual (Bohn);
- State Papers, Dom. Car. II, vol. xlviii. n. 98;
- Walker's Sufferings of the Clergy, ii. 145;
- Wood's Athenæ Oxonienses (Bliss) iii. 49, 611, iv. 52, and Fasti, ii. 11, 263.

== Bibliography ==
- Cooper, Thompson (1899). "Watson, Richard (1612-1685)" . In Lee, Sidney (ed.). Dictionary of National Biography. Vol. 60. London: Smith, Elder & Co. pp. 22–24.
