= Jeremy Jennings =

Jeremy Jennings is an English political theorist and professor of political theory at King's College London. He is predominantly interested in the history of political thought, often with specific reference to France. He has authored a number of books on political topics, including the works of Georges Sorel, syndicalism and socialism. He became the founding editor of the European Journal of Political Theory. His other interests include political ideology and contemporary political theory. Jennings has been employed by the universities of Swansea and then Birmingham.

== Bibliography ==
- Georges Sorel: the Character and Development of his Thought. Macmillan: London, 1985.
- Syndicalism in France: A Study of Ideas. Macmillan: London, 1990.
- Intellectuals in Twentieth-Century France. Macmillan, London, 1993. (ed)
- Intellectuals in Politics: From the Dreyfus Affair to Salman Rushdie. Routledge: London & New York 1997. (eds.) with Tony Kemp-Welch.
- The Edinburgh Encyclopedia of Continental Philosophy. Edinburgh UP: Edinburgh, 1999. (eds.) with Simon Glendinning et al.
- Georges Sorel: Reflections on violence. CUP: Cambridge, 1999; 2nd ed. 2002; Chinese ed. 2003. Ed and translator
- Critical Concepts: Socialism. Routledge: London, 2003, 4 Vols.. (ed)
- Republicanism in Theory and Practice. Routledge: London, 2005. (ed) with Iseult Honohan
