= Charles Coates (priest) =

English cleric and antiquarian

Charles Coates (c. 1746 – 1813) was an English cleric and antiquarian.

== Life ==
The son of John Coates, a watchmaker in the City of London, he was born at Reading, Berkshire in or about 1746. After nine years' schooling at Reading grammar school under the Rev. John Spicer, he was admitted, at age 16, as a sizar to Caius College, Cambridge, on 5 May 1762. He proceeded M.B. in 1767, and on 16 June of the same year was admitted "pensionarius major".

Coates went into the church as his profession, and was for some years, between 1775 and 1797, curate to Charles Sturges, at that time vicar of Ealing. In 1780 he also became vicar of Preston, Dorset, a preferment he owed to Spicer; and early in 1788 he was presented to the neighbouring vicarage of Osmington by Shute Barrington, Bishop of Salisbury. In the same year, he was created LL.B. by the Archbishop of Canterbury, and was then appointed chaplain to the Prince Regent. He was elected a fellow of the Society of Antiquaries of London on 18 April 1793.

In the last years of his life, Coates suffered illness and domestic loss. He died at Osmington on 7 April 1813.

== Works ==
In 1791 Coates issued proposals for The History and Antiquities of Reading; it appeared in 1802, and was followed, seven years later, by a Supplement with corrections. He used in particular notes of John Loveday. He also collected material for a continuation of John Le Neve's Lives of the Protestant Bishops, which he presented to Alexander Chalmers for use in his General Biographical Dictionary.

== Notes ==
Attribution

This article incorporates text from a publication now in the public domain: Stephen, Leslie, ed. (1887). "Coates, Charles". Dictionary of National Biography. Vol. 11. London: Smith, Elder & Co.
