= Thomas Boyce (dramatist) =

English cleric and dramatist

Thomas Boyce (c. 1732?–1793) was an English cleric and dramatist.

== Life ==
He was born at Swanton, Norfolk, the son of John Boyce, brewer, of Norfolk. Boyce spent four years under Mr. Bullimer at Norwich and four at Scarning under Mr. Brett. He was admitted as a pensioner on 17 March 1749–50 to Caius College, Cambridge, proceeding B.A. in 1754 and M.A. in 1767. Ordained deacon 2 Nov. 1755, he served as curate of Cringleford in 1768, and rector of Worlingham, Suffolk, from 1780 until his death. He also served as chaplain to the Earl of Suffolk.

Boyce died on 4 February 1793, in his 62nd year.

== Works ==
Boyce was the author of A specimen of Elegiac Poetry, 1773, and one tragedy, Harold, London 1786, which was never acted. In the preface to this, he states that when he wrote it, he was unaware that Richard Cumberland's play on the same subject was in rehearsal at Drury Lane.

== Plays ==
1. Harold: a tragedy, Thomas Boyce, (London 1786).
