= Martin Davy =

English physician and academic

Martin Davy (1763–1839) was an English physician and academic, Master of Caius College, Cambridge from 1803. In later life he was also a cleric.

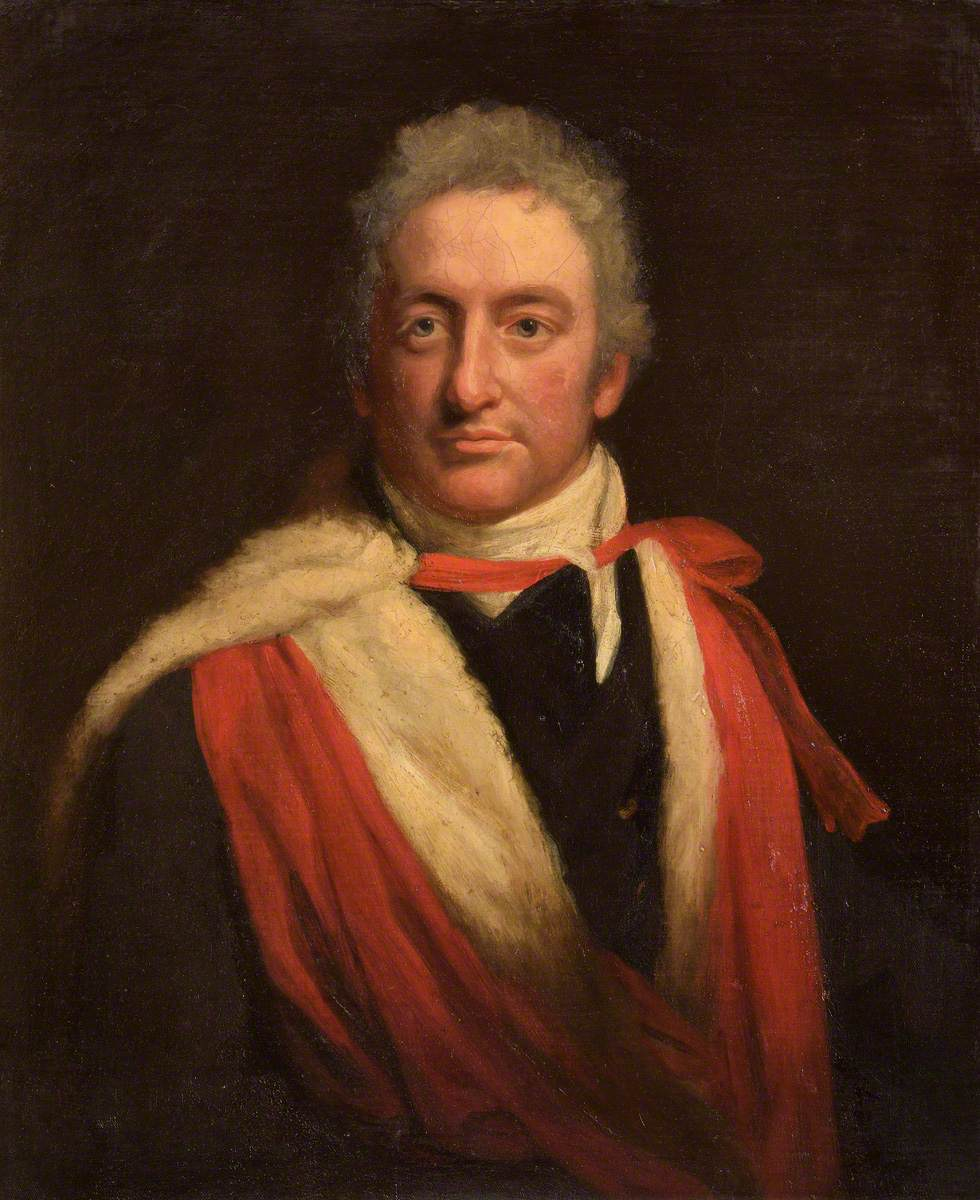
Martin Davy by John Opie

== Life ==
Davy's father was a country gentleman at Ingoldisthorpe, Norfolk. He was educated first at Norwich grammar school, then was a pupil of a Great Yarmouth surgeon. Later he studied medicine at Edinburgh, and adopted the Brunonian system.

Davy entered Caius College, Cambridge in 1786, and graduated M.B. in 1792 and M.D. in 1797. In 1795 he was an unsuccessful candidate for the mastership of Caius, when Richard Belward was elected. For the next two years he accompanied Lord Ossulton on a tour including Italy.

In 1803, on Belward's death, Davy became Master of Caius. Both before and after his election to the mastership Davy practised medicine with success. Vice-chancellor in 1803–4, he took steps to exclude a local medical practitioner, Frederick Thackeray, from taking a medical degree, by a restrictive interpretation given to a statute relating to medical study. As a college man, however, he is credited with a meritocratic approach. He was vice-chancellor a second time in 1827–8. Critical accounts by Henry Gunning and Joseph Romilly affected his subsequent reputation. He had Whig principles, and supported a move of 1834 in favour of the university education of nonconformists.

In 1811 Davy took holy orders, and was admitted D.D. In 1827 the Tory ministry gave him the rectory of Cottenham, Cambridgeshire, and he was made prebendary of Chichester in the year 1832.

Davy was elected a Fellow of the Royal Society in 1801, and a Fellow of the Society of Antiquaries of London in 1812. He died at Cambridge on 18 May 1839, and was buried on 25 May in the antechapel of his college. He bequeathed Heacham Lodge, Norfolk, to follow the mastership of Caius.

== Works ==
Davy wrote in 1809 a pamphlet Observations upon Mr. Fox's Letter to Mr. Grey contained in Lord Holland's preface to C. J. Fox's History of the Early Part of the Reign of James the Second, 1808, a verbal quibble with Charles James Fox.

== Notes ==
Attribution

This article incorporates text from a publication now in the public domain: Stephen, Leslie, ed. (1888). "Davy, Martin". Dictionary of National Biography. Vol. 14. London: Smith, Elder & Co.
