= Gooch =

Gooch is a surname. Gooch or the Gooch is also a nickname. It may refer to:

== Surname ==
=== People ===
- See Gooch baronets for a list of baronets with the surname (some are listed below)
- Alexander Gooch (died 1558), English Protestant martyr
- Arthur Gooch (footballer) (born 1931), former Australian rules footballer
- Sir Arthur Gooch, 14th Baronet (born 1937), English baronet and retired British Army officer
- Arthur Gooch (criminal) (died 1936), American criminal and the only person ever executed under the Lindbergh kidnapping law
- Barnabas Gooch (died c. 1626), English lawyer, academic, Vice-Chancellor of the University of Cambridge and Member of Parliament
- Brad Gooch (born 1952), American writer
- Brison D. Gooch (1925–2014), American historian
- Charmian Gooch (born 1965), British anti-corruption campaigner and activist
- Daniel Gooch (1816–1889), English chief mechanical engineer and chairman of the Great Western Railway
- Daniel Linn Gooch (1853–1913), U.S. Representative from Kentucky
- Daniel W. Gooch (1820–1891), U.S. Representative from Massachusetts
- Edwin Gooch (1869–1964), British politician and trade union leader
- Fanny Chambers Gooch (1849–1913), American writer
- Frank Austin Gooch (1852–1929), American chemist and engineer
- George Peabody Gooch (1873–1968), British journalist, historian and politician
- Graham Gooch (born 1953), English cricketer
- Henry Gooch (Conservative politician) (1871–1959), British barrister, educationalist and politician
- Jeff Gooch (born 1974), American former National Football League player
- Jim Gooch Jr. (born 1951), American politician
- Jimmy Gooch (footballer) (1921–2001), English football goalkeeper
- Joe Gooch (born 1977), English singer and guitarist
- John Viret Gooch (1812–1900), locomotive superintendent of the London and South Western Railway
- Johnny Gooch (1897–1975), American Major League Baseball player and minor league player, manager, pitching coach and scout
- Jon Gooch (born 1984), English musician, record producer and DJ
- Keith Gooch (born 1959), former Canadian Football League player
- Lee Gooch (1890–1966), American Major League Baseball player and college head coach
- Lynden Gooch (born 1995), American footballer in England
- Martin Gooch (born 1972), British filmmaker
- Nancy Gooch (1811–1901), African American settler in California
- Peter Gooch (born 1949), English former cricketer
- Robert Gooch (1784–1830), English physician
- Sir Robert Gooch, 11th Baronet (1903–1978), British Army colonel
- Robert Kent Gooch (1893–1982), American college football quarterback and political science professor
- Stan Gooch (1932–2010), British psychologist
- Steve Gooch (born 1967), American politician
- Talor Gooch (born 1991), American golfer
- Thomas Gooch (disambiguation)
- Tiny Gooch (1903–1986), American all-around college athlete, attorney, and politician
- U. L. Gooch (1923–2021), American aviator, aviation entrepreneur, and politician
- Sir William Gooch, 1st Baronet (1681–1751), colonial Governor of Virginia
- William Gooch (astronomer) (1770–1792), English astronomer on the Vancouver Expedition

=== Fictional characters ===
- Stephanie Gooch, on the television series Scrubs
- The Gooch, an unseen character on the television series Diff'rent Strokes
- The Gooch, an occasional character on the New Zealand television series Outrageous Fortune, portrayed by Karl Willetts.
- Steve "Gooch" Yamaguchi, a supporting character in The Epic Tales of Captain Underpants
- Vinnie the Gooch, the color commentator in the Backyard Baseball video game series

== Nickname ==
- Colm Cooper, nicknamed "The Gooch" senior Kerry GAA Gaelic football player
- Devin Setoguchi, nicknamed "The Gooch", NHL player for the Minnesota Wild
- Oguchi Onyewu, nicknamed "Gooch", association football player for the United States National Team and Sporting Portugal

== See also ==
- Gooch crucible, a sintered glass crucible
- Gooch valve for steam locomotives
- Goochland (disambiguation)
