= Bølareinen =

Rock art in Trøndelag, Norway

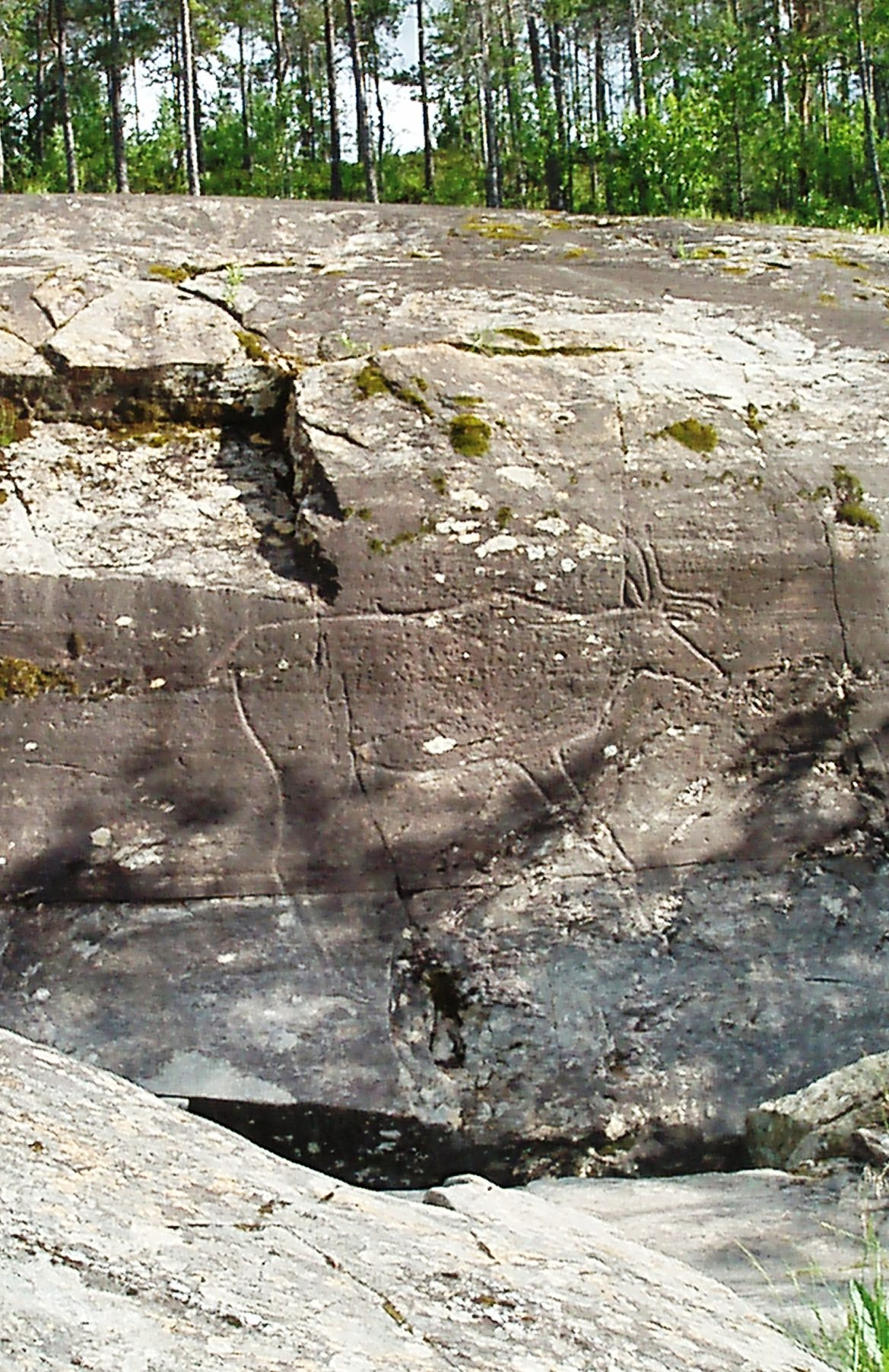
The Bølarein depicts a life-size female reindeer, 180 cm long and 136 cm high.

Bølareinen (English: the Bøla reindeer) is the name of the primary motif in a large petroglyph site near Stod in Steinkjer Municipality in Trøndelag county, Norway. It is sometimes referred to as Bølafeltet (English: the Bøla site). The Bølarein has been mentioned as "probably the most well known of all the Norwegian petroglyphs", and as "the finest rock carving we have in our country."

The Bølarein was discovered in 1842. Since 1969, several other petroglyphs have been found on the same rock face. It is now considered to consist of around 30 figures which can be divided into four groups. The largest and most visible figures depict a reindeer, a bear, an elk, a seabird and a skier. In the Nordic context, distinctions are drawn between carvings depicting hunting (“veideristninger”) and carvings depicting agriculture (“jordbruksristninger”), and the Bøla field shows hunting carvings. These may have been used as part of hunting magic, or to mark hunting territory.

The south Sámi museum Saemien Sijte took over the operation of the Bøla cafe in 2017, and the petroglyphs are now interpreted in light of Sami history in the area.

== Location and history of the find ==
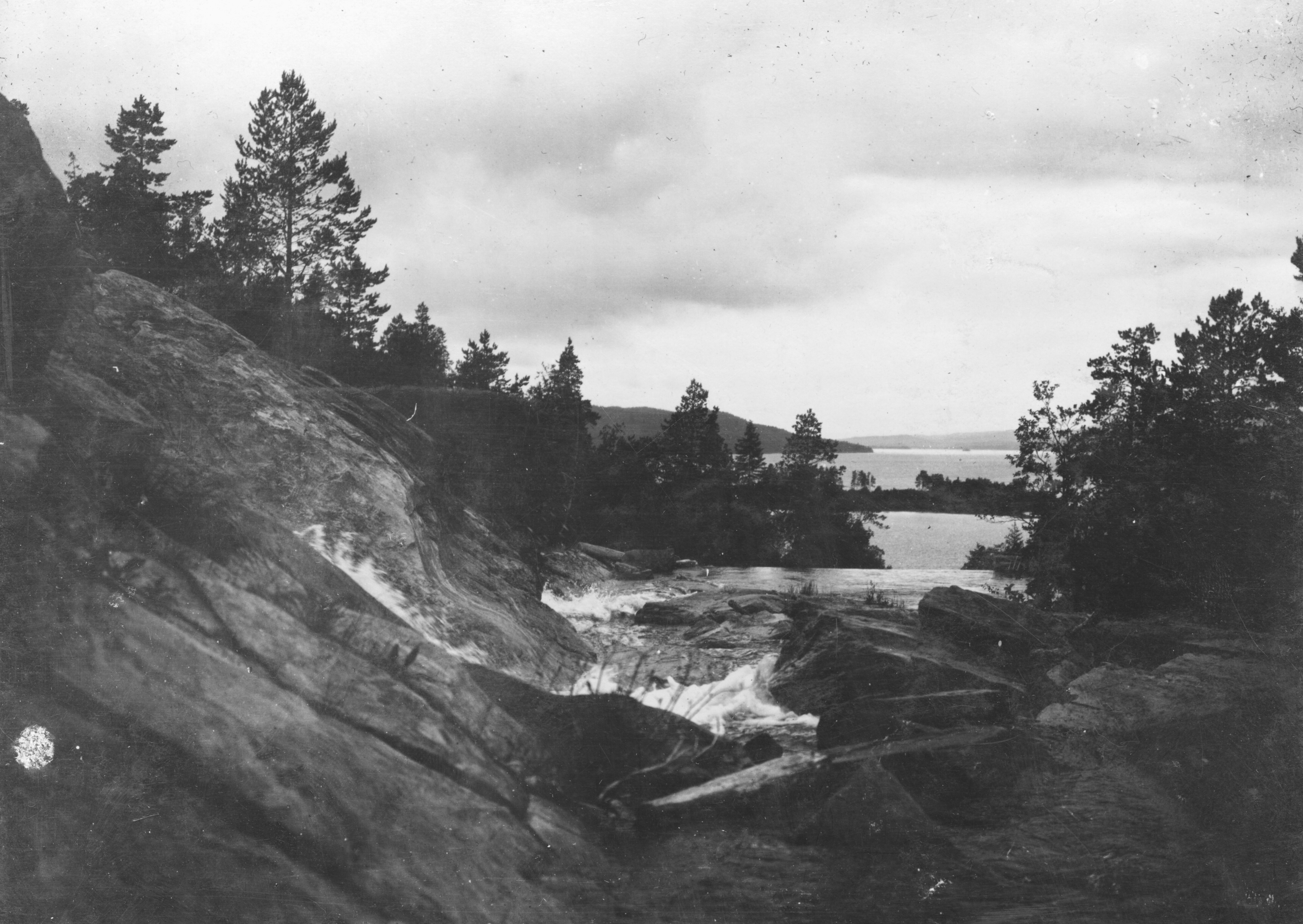
The landscape around the figures in 1907, before the arrival of the railroad.

The Bøla petroglyphs are located east of Steinkjer, where the small Bøla river flows into Snåsavatnet (English: Lake Snåsa).

The carvings are dated to 3400–3200 years BCE. At that time, Snåsa Lake was still part of the Trondheim Fjord. The water level was 35–40 metres higher than it is today, stopping just below the carvings. Due to the rise of land masses following the last glacial period, Snåsa Lake is no longer part of the Trondheim Fjord. At the time that the carvings were made, the rock face was a headland jutting into the fjord's waters.

The reindeer was discovered in 1842 by Benjamin Vikran, a local farmer from Vikran Farm.

The first drawing of the figure was made c. 1870 by journalist David Habel. The first survey was carried out by the Swedish archaeologist Gustaf Hallström in 1907. Agnes Schulz carried out further research in 1934, and her work was incorporated into an overview produced by Gutorm Gjessing in 1936. Professor Kalle Sognnes carried out research on the site from 1979 to the 2000s.

When the Nordland Line was constructed in the 1920s, a railway embankment was erected beside the petroglyphs. As a result, the rock face was separated from Snåsa lake.

== Description of the figures ==
The Bøla reindeer is carved on a vertical rock face beside the river Bøla with its head pointing in the direction of Snåsa lake. The carving depicts a life size reindeer (180 x 136 cm). The carved lines have an approximate width of 2 cm, with contouring that is perhaps intended to depict fur. In Sami culture, the figure is interpreted as being either a reindeer cow (aaltoe) or as a staajne, a typically infertile reindeer cow that shares some physical characteristics with male reindeer.

The elk is located 50 meters above the reindeer. It is 41 cm long and 36 cm high and is located on a rock slope. It was discovered in the 1990s by archaeology students.

The bear is around half a meter tall and a meter wide. It is located 20 metres from the reindeer on a vertical rock face. The bear was discovered c. 1970.

The skier, also known as "Bølamannen" (English: The Bøla man) depicts a human standing on either a boat, short skis, or snowshoes. The zigzag lines around the foot suggest that it is most likely to be skis or snowshoes. The figure is located on a flat rock face. It is 148 cm high, and the ski is 127 cm long. The person is drawn in profile, in one continuous line, and holds a thick staff in its hands. The skier was discovered in 2001.

The bird was found at the same time as the skier in 2001. It is a long-necked seabird, about 50 cm long. There may be traces of several further bird carvings close by.

Professor Kalle Sognnes stated in 2007 that this site, with its many new discoveries between 1969 and 2001, has become one of the largest collections of rock carvings in Trøndelag. Other petroglyph sites in the area depict the more common figures of red deer and seabirds, while the skier is unique. Figures of skiers are rare, and its size makes this skier unique in Northern Europe.

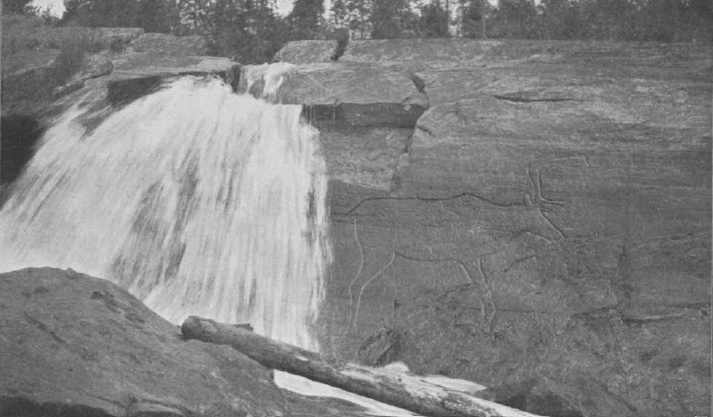
Gustaf Hallström's picture of the reindeer figure (1907).

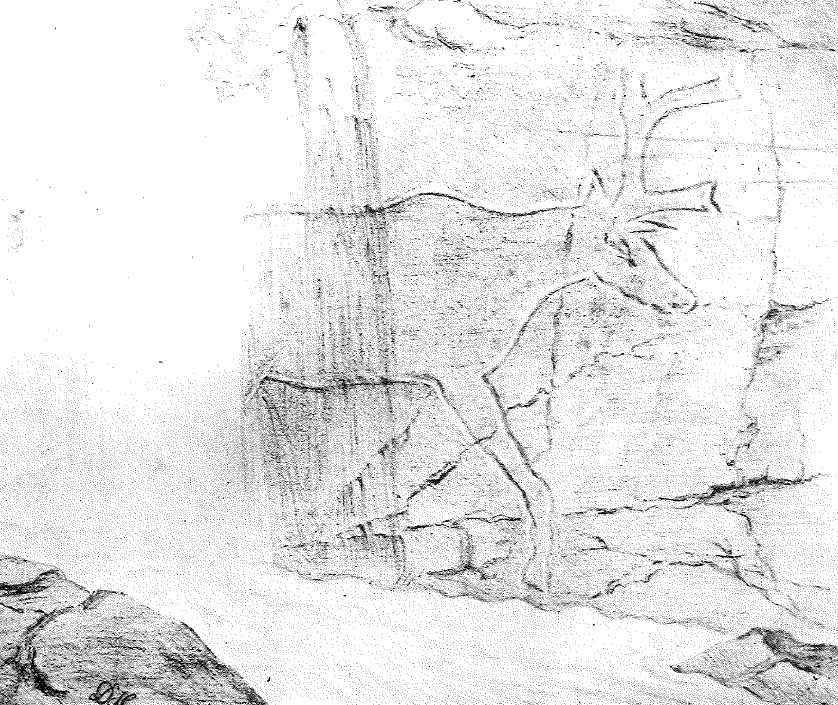
David Habel's drawing (1870).

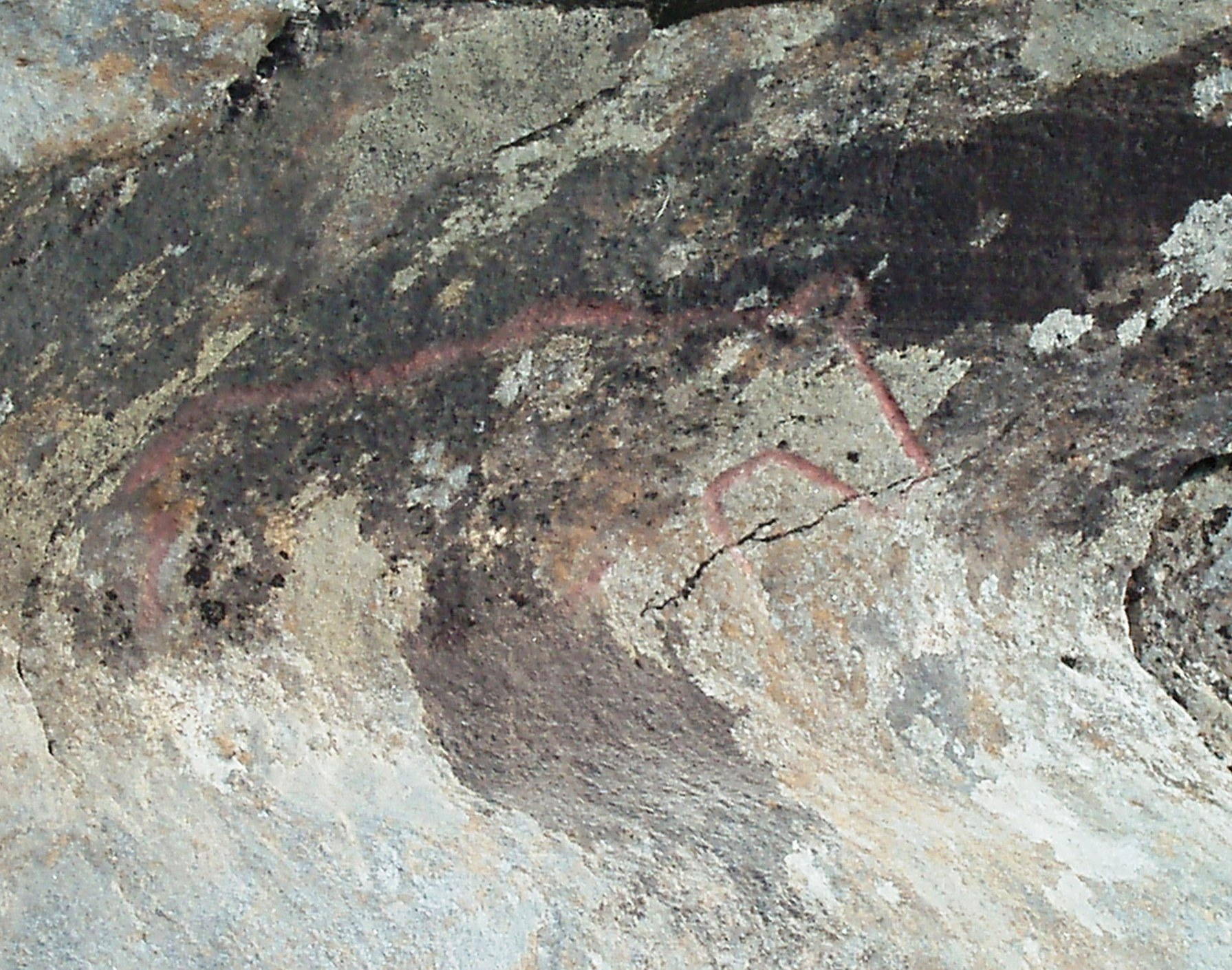
The bear was discovered around 1970.

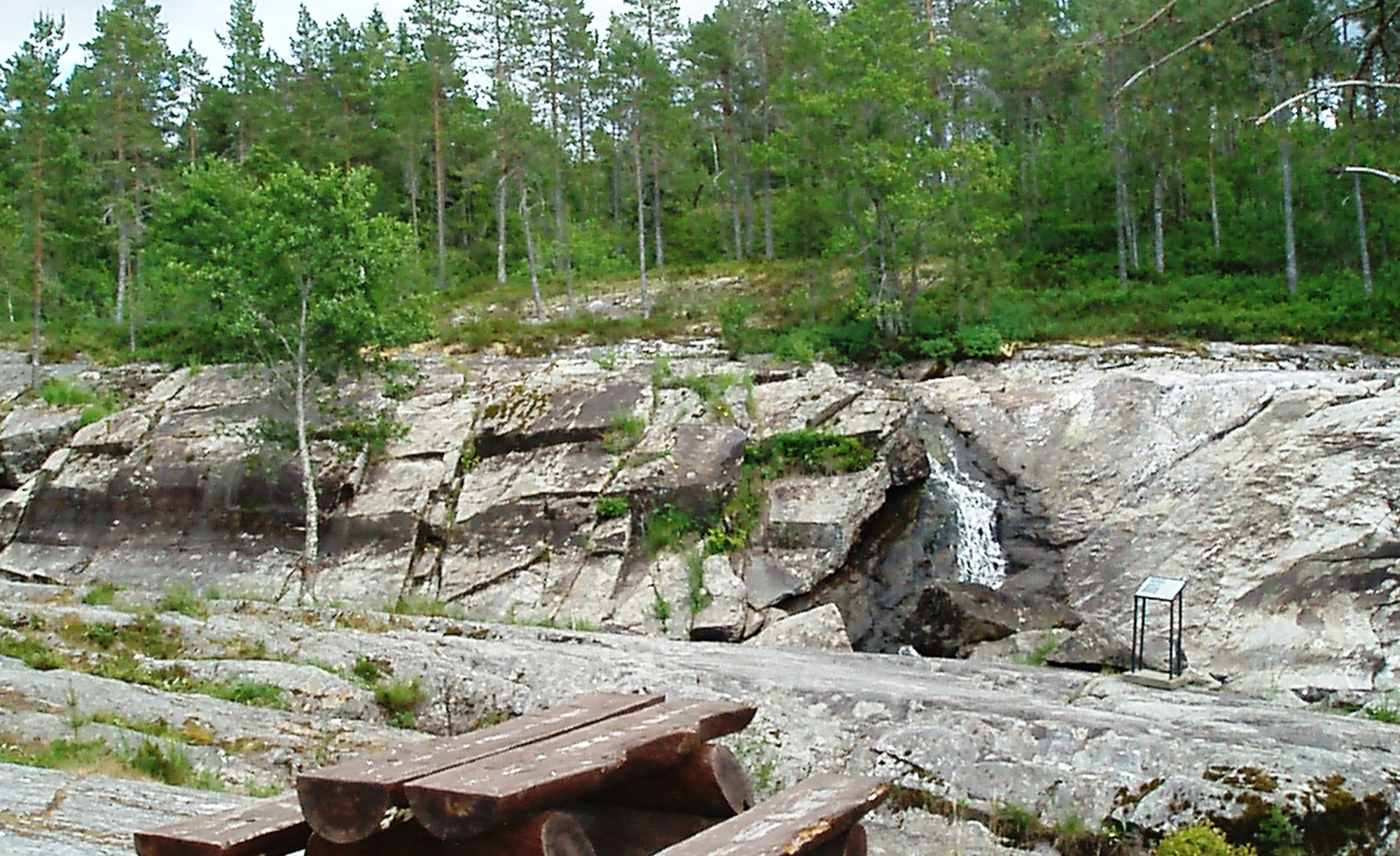
The upright figures on the south side of the rockface, with the reindeer to the left of the tree.

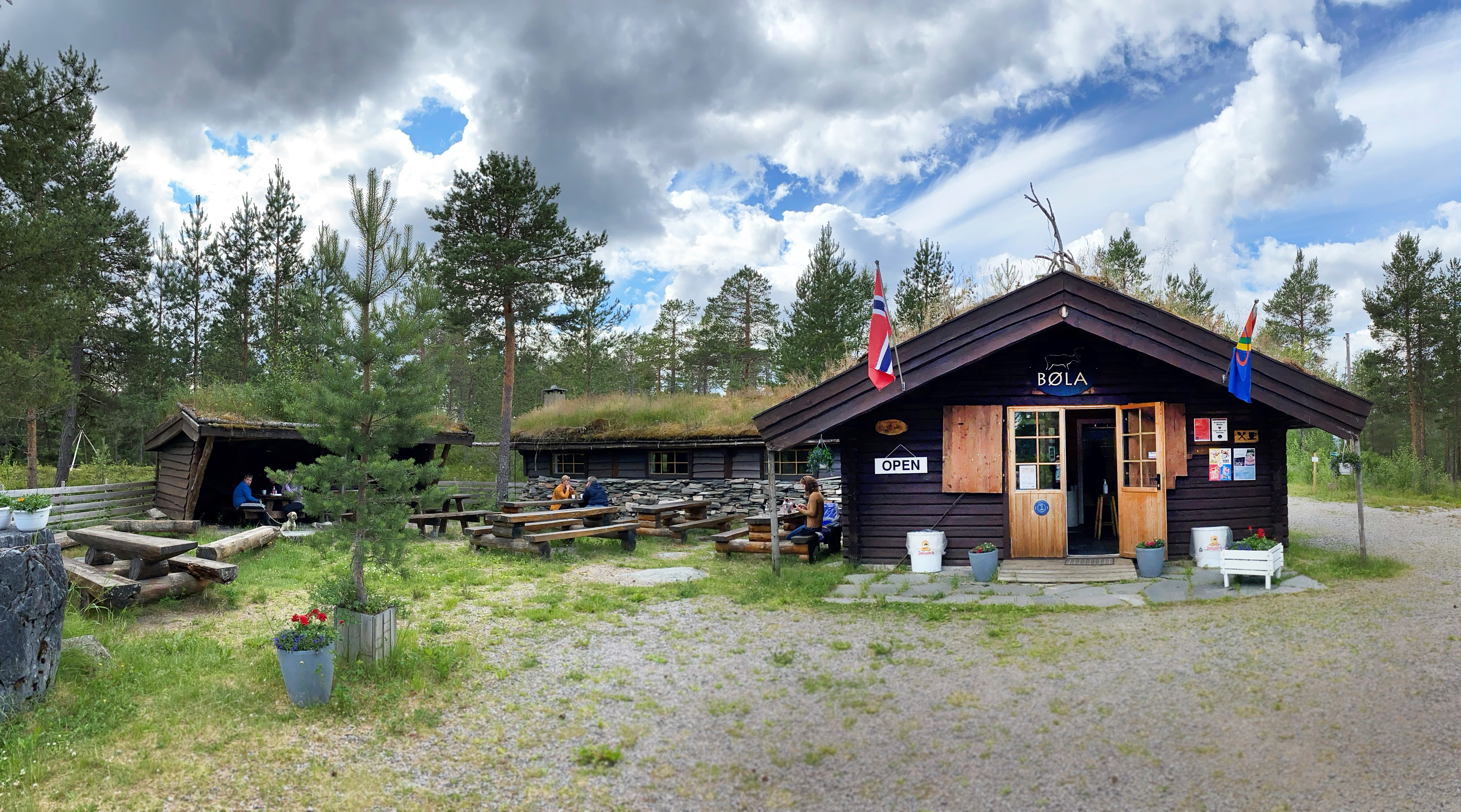
Bøla café was built in 1992.

== Overview and interpretations ==
There is a consensus that the placement of the carvings at a river outlet into the fjord is deliberate and strategic. The location and function of the carvings may have been related to hunting magic or marked hunting territory. Hunters would use such rock art to communicate with their prey and with the surrounding landscape. Sognnes suggests that the carvings can be attributed to members of a hunting culture that travelled between different hunting locations around Snåsa lake by boat.

It is unclear whether this site ought to be considered a beach site like other hunting petroglyphs around the Trondheim Fjord, but there is widespread agreement that the placement of the carvings close to the river was deliberate. Rock carvings were frequently placed by the last waterfall before the river opened into the fjord, as is attested from several Swedish petroglyph sites. Rock art that is situated beside a waterfall may have been used in a shamanistic practice, wherein the roar of the water was one of several means of allowing the shaman, perhaps a Sami noaidi, to enter into a trance. In Sami religion it is a common thought that the deity Tjatseolmai, the ruler of water, was to be found near sites with running water. On this note, it is possible that the bear figure may have been a physical representation of Tjatseolmai. The Sami researcher Ernst Manker believed that all kinds of significant places in the landscape could be perceived as a sacred site within the Sami animistic cosmology.

Some winters, the Bøla river freezes, concealing some of the figures beneath the ice. This may in fact have been part of the rationale behind placing the figures here and become part of the narrative about the place. The Bøla carvings include both images of large prey animals such as elk and reindeer, and smaller prey such as seabirds. Sognnes believes that images of large animals such as elk and whales may have been created not just because they were prey but also out of respect for the animals' powers and characteristics.

Since the large reindeer figure is a female, it may also have been part of a fertility cult. Many rock carvings of elk are also female.

== The area today ==
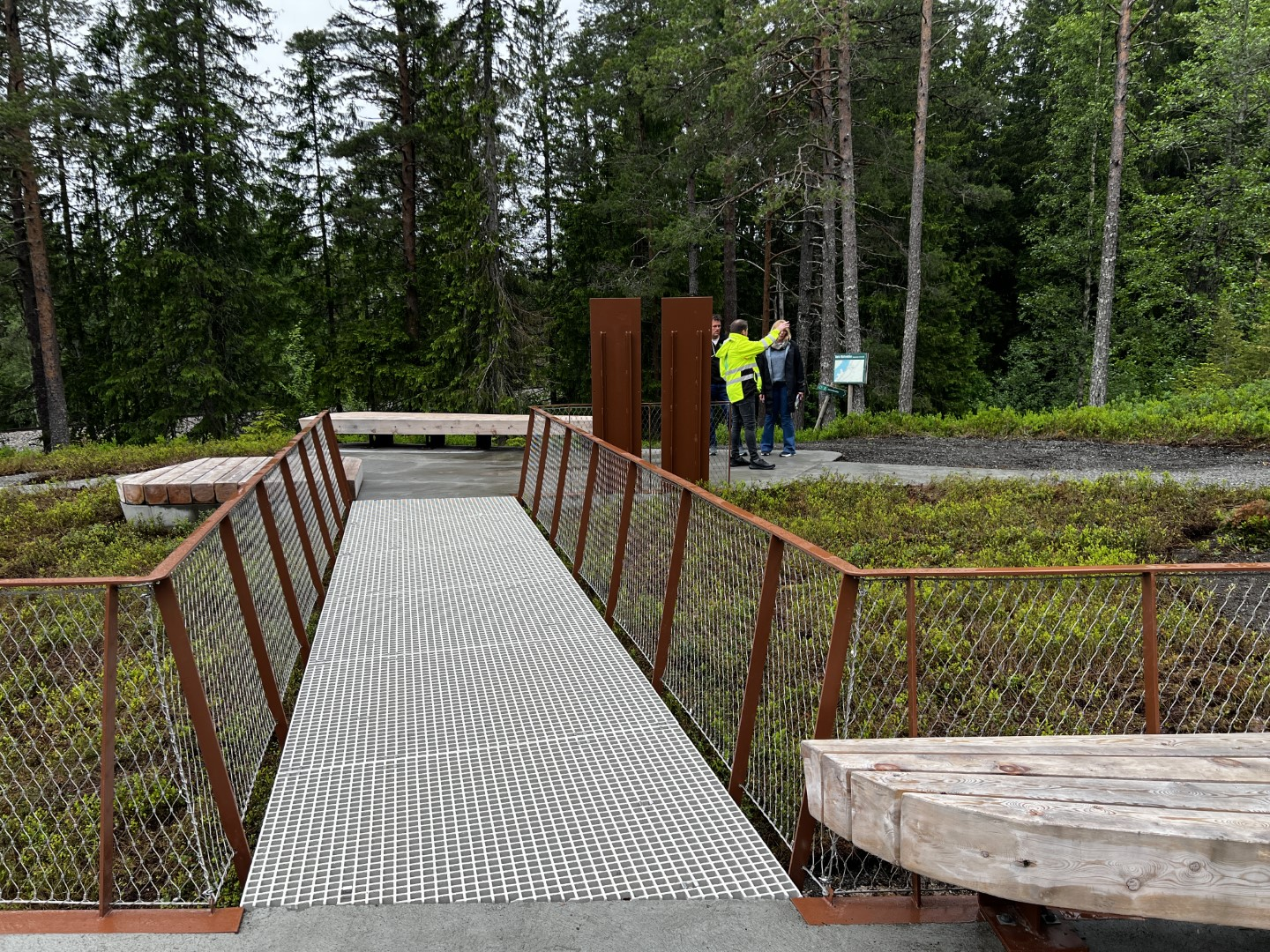
New walking paths in 2025

The rock carvings are located along county road 763 on the south side of Snåsa lake, a few hundred meters up from the lake, 20 kilometres from Steinkjer city.

Bølareinen is part of Trøndelag County Council's educational outreach project Bergkunstreisen (The Rock Art Trail).

== See also ==
- Rock carvings in Central Norway
- Reindeer herding
- Bardal rock carvings
- Leirfall rock carvings

== Further reading in english ==
- Kalle Sognnes (2001). «When rock art comes into being: On the recognition and acceptance of new discoveries». Rock Art Research. bd 21: s 75–81
- Kalle Sognnes (2003). «On shoreline dating of rock art». I: Acta Archaeologica. doi:10.1111/j.0065-001X.2003.aar740104.x
- Kalle Sognnes (2011). «The case of the lone reindeer : The Bøla rock art site in Trøndelag, Norway: Introduction», i: Acta Archaeologica. bd. 82, nr. 1, des. 2011, ISSN 0065-101X, s. 81–82, doi:10.1111/j.1600-0390.2011.00404.x.
- Kalle Sognnes; Jens Bjarne Mohrsen (2004). «A Midwinter day's Mare ». I: Inora : International Newsletter on Rock Art; No 38, 2004. (pdf)
