= Robert Gooch (disambiguation) =

Robert Gooch (1784–1830) was an English physician.

Robert Gooch may also refer to:

- Robert Kent Gooch (1893–1982), American football player
- Sir Robert Gooch, 11th Baronet (1903–1978), British Army officer and politician
- Sir Robert Douglas Gooch, 4th Baronet (1905–1989), of the Gooch baronets

== See also ==
- Gooch (disambiguation)
