= Bardal rock carvings =

- Bardalfeltet (Norwegian)
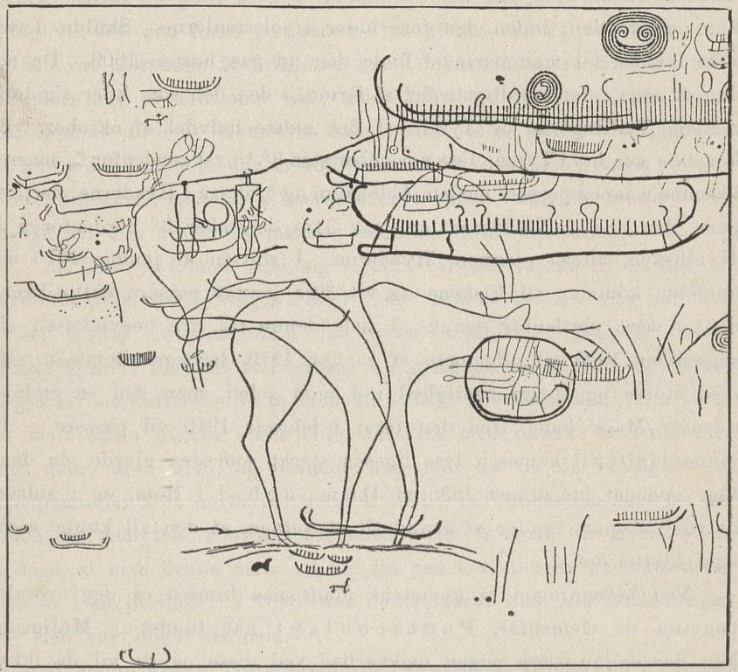
- Interactive map of Bardal rock carvings
- Type: rock art

The Bardal rock carvings (Norwegian: Bardalfeltet) is a large collection of petroglyphs on Bardal Farm in Steinkjer Municipality in Trøndelag county, Norway. What makes the rock carvings at Bardal especially noteworthy is the presence of figures from the Stone Age, Bronze Age and Iron Age all on the same rock surface, with the newer figures having been carved on top of figures from the Stone Age. For thousands of years, from 4000 BCE to Year 0, people carved figures into rock at Bardal.

In the Nordic context, rock carvings are generally divided into two main categories: those depicting hunting (veideristninger) and those depicting agriculture (jordbruksristninger). Hunting carvings are older, and depict a range of different prey and totemic animals such as deer, whales and seabirds. The younger carvings are agricultural carvings from the Bronze and early Iron Ages. The images depicted in these carvings are first and foremost boats, but also cupmarks, people, horses and geometric figures.

The Bardal field features carvings of both types, with some of the younger agricultural carvings placed directly on top of the older hunting carvings. This can make the Bardal field a bit difficult to take in at first. It is believed that the very process of carving the newer images on top of the pre-existing ones had a special meaning.

== Location and history of the find ==
The Beitstad area is located on the northern shore of the Beitstadfjorden, the innermost arm of the Trondheim Fjord. Alongside Stjørdal, Beitstad has the largest concentration of known petroglyphs in Central Norway. In addition to Bardal, there are petroglyphs at Hammer, Skjevik, Homnes and Tessem.

According to Professor Anders Hagen, the fact that Beitstad is situated at the juncture between mountains, forest and coast may have rendered it a "cultic centre" for early hunters in Inntrøndelag.

The Bardal field was first discovered and described in 1896 by Knut H. Lossius, an educator and archaeologist from Trondheim. Over the subsequent 40 years, Bardal was studied by archaeologists Gustaf Hallström, Karl Ditlev Rygh, Theodor Petersen and Gutorm Gjessing. In 1936, Gjessing suggested that Hallström's discussions of the carvings had made the Bardal field "a focal point in virtually all debates about problems pertaining to petroglyphs."

The main field is located on a south-facing slope, close to Bardal Farm. In addition to the main field, called Bardal 1, archaeologists have found four additional, smaller collections of carvings nearby.

== Description of the figures ==
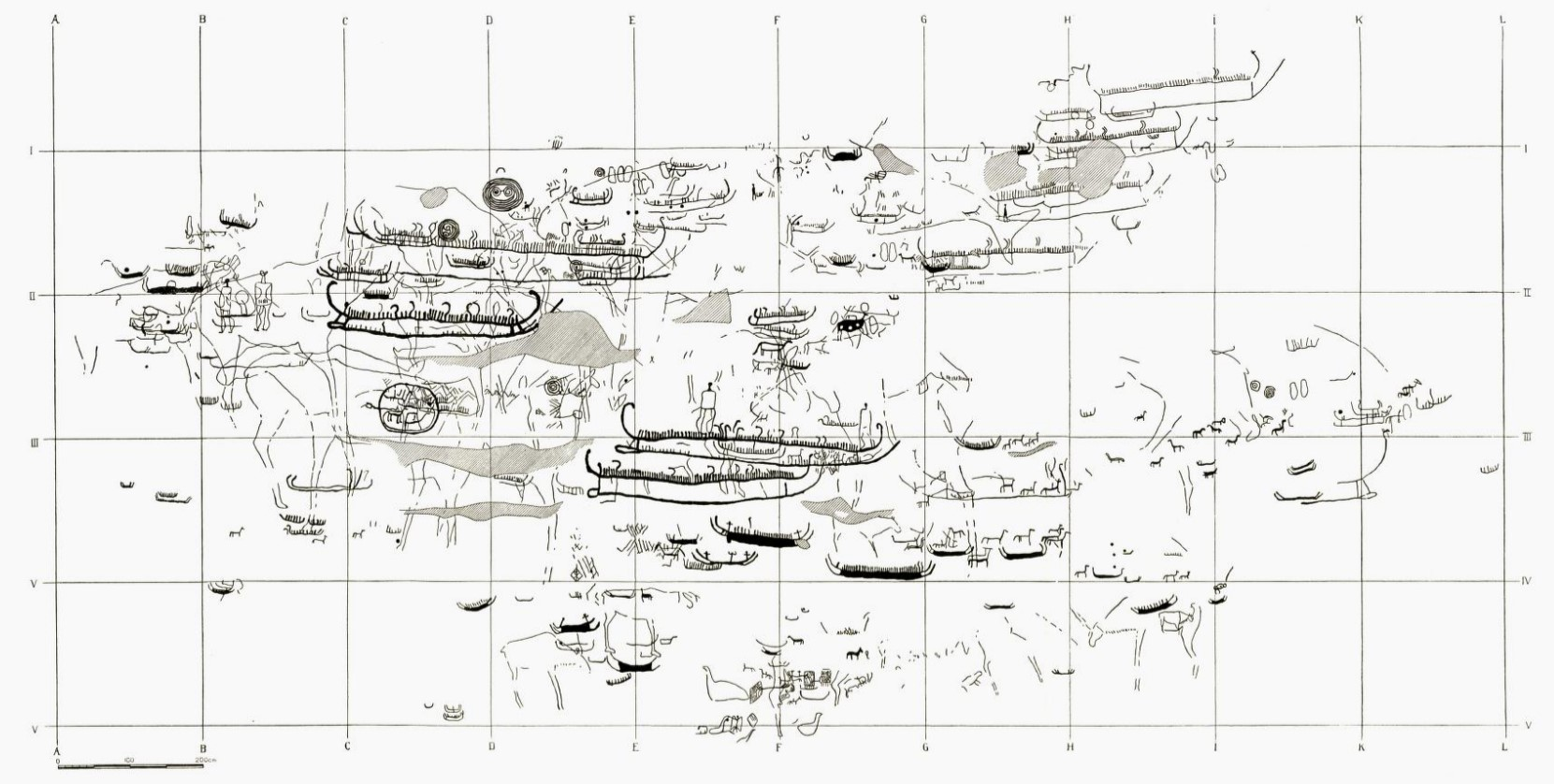
There are several layers and generations of rock art mixed together.

The field is one of the largest in Central Norway, measuring 26 metres wide by 13 metres high. The rock face slopes at an angle of about 35°.

The surface of the rock is split in two by a vertical crevice. The majority of the approx. 400 figures can be found on the western end/left side of the surface and it is here that hunting carvings and agricultural carvings overlap. There are a few figures located on the right, namely footprints, boats and smaller animals.

=== Hunting carvings ===
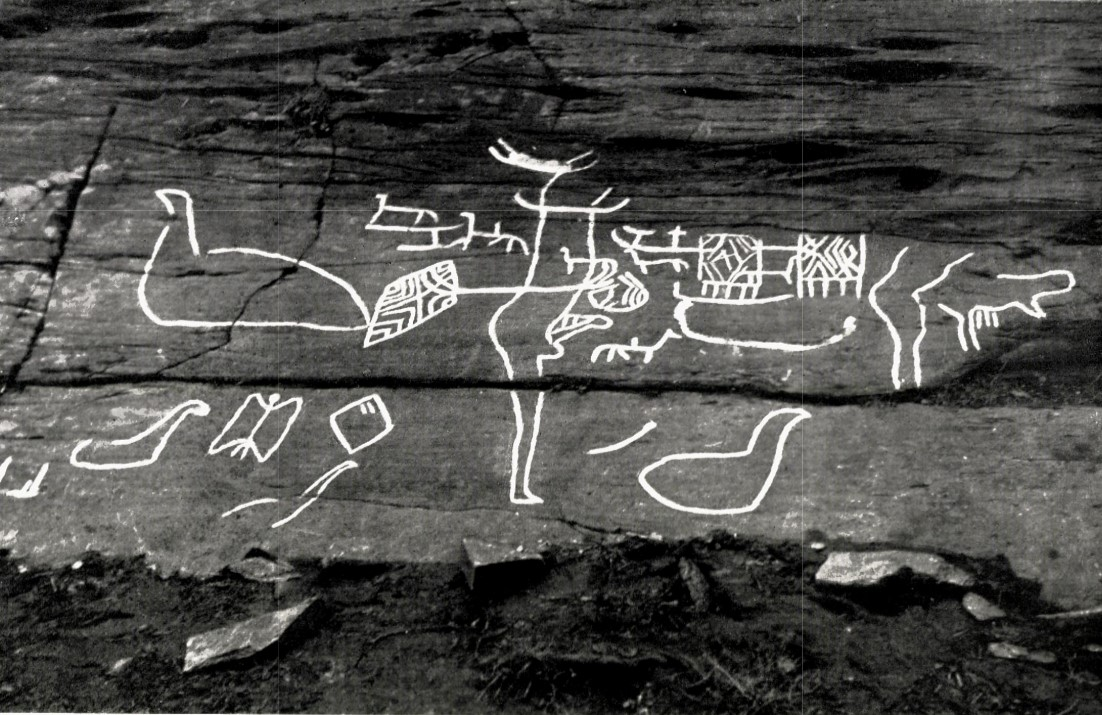
"Bird-whale type" rock art to the left and bottom. Top right to people, interpreted as a sexual intercourse.

The approx. 50 hunting carvings make up the oldest layer of the field. They depict prey animals in near-life-size. A group of overlapping life-size elk/moose figures are outlined in a naturalistic style, which is interpreted as a sign that these particular figures stem from the earliest known periods of rock art. In total, the field depicts 15-20 deer. Most of these are elk/moose while the rest are reindeer. The largest elks/moose are 330, 260 and 240 cm long.

At the top of the rock face is the figure of a whale, perhaps a beaked whale, six metres in length. In addition to deer and whales, there are five birds and one bear. The bird figures are between 20 and 60 cm long. The figures are of the "bird-whale type", meaning that they are carved in such a way that they can be interpreted as either whales or birds.

There is also a small number of human figures: a man (114 cm tall) with a prominent penis, and a pair of figures that may be representing sexual intercourse.

=== Agricultural carvings ===
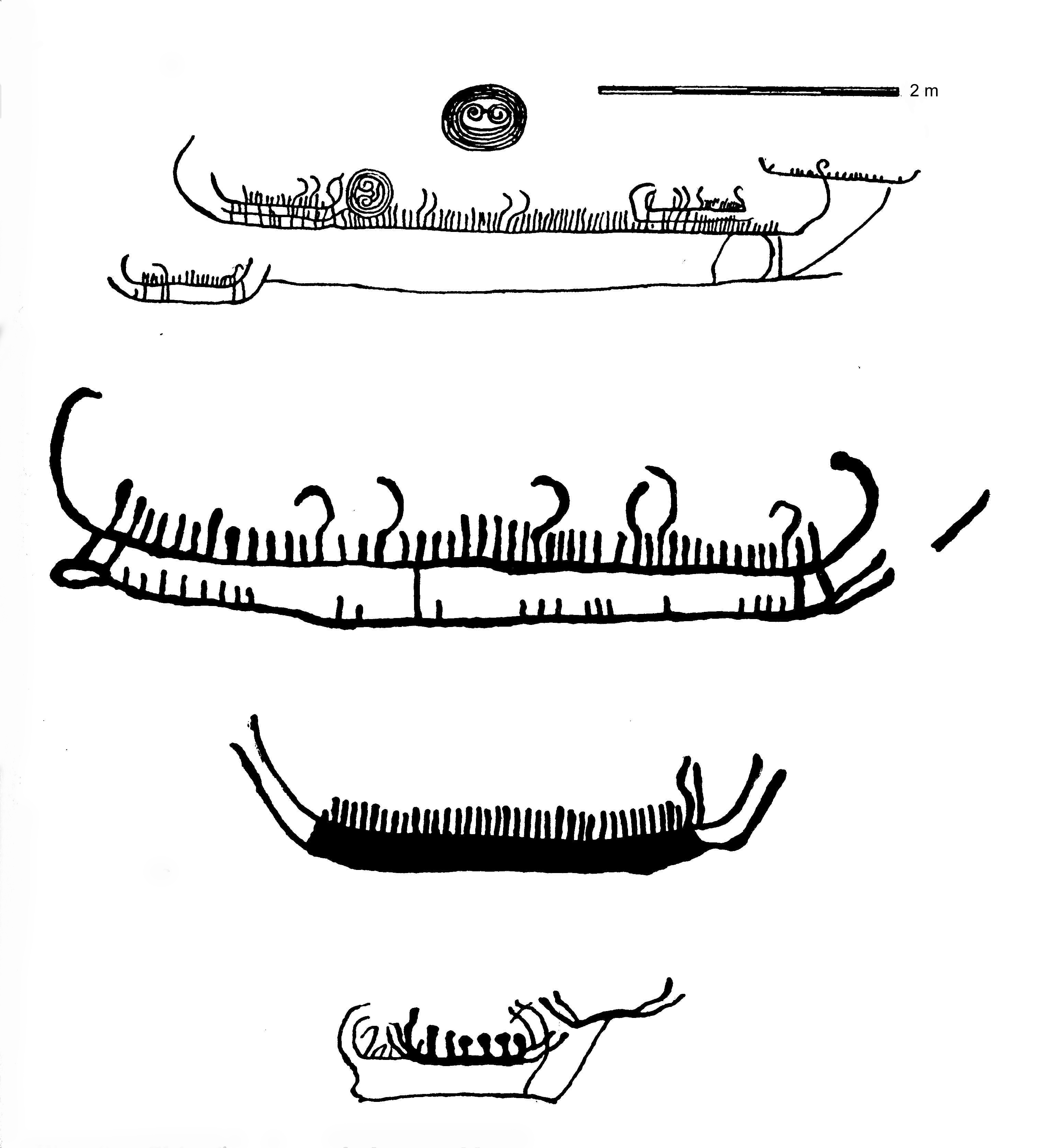
Boats with "crew lines"; some of which are playing lurs.

The remaining figures are typical of Bronze Age agricultural carvings, i.e. dating to approx. 1800 to 500 BCE. The figures depicted are predominantly boats, but horses, spirals and cupmarks also feature. In total, the western part depicts approx. 150 ships, 59 horses, 1 dog, 15 footprints and 11 rings/spirals from the Bronze Age. The easternmost part of the field depicts 43 ships, 17 footprints, 5 horses, 1 dog and 3 rings.

The largest of the boats is 4.5 m long and features 90 vertical lines, often called crew lines (“mannskapsstreker”), which are usually interpreted as representing the people manning the boat. This boat carving is one of the largest known boat carvings in Scandinavia. Most of the boats in the Bardal field are of the Bronze Age type, with a distinct bottom plank/keel and railing. The boat is similar to the Hjortspring boat, an Iron Age find from Denmark.

The footprints that appear in many Bronze Age carvings have been understood as belonging to both humans and gods. The few Bronze Age human figures are atypical, featuring large torsos, strong legs and small heads.

== Overview and interpretations ==
The carvings at Bardal can be dated back to the Stone Age (perhaps 4000 BCE) through the Bronze Age and right up to the early Iron Age, around Year 0. The group of elk/moose figures form the central component of the first phase of carving. Not only were agricultural carvings placed on the top of existing hunting carvings, but we can see that even within each period, carvings were placed on top of one another. The field was therefore used by several generations over long periods of time.

The people who later carved boats and other Bronze Age motifs did so without trying to preserve the figures that were already there. Some believe that the very process of carving the new motifs over the old ones had some special significance. The archaeologist Kalle Sognnes has written that "it seems that it was in some way important to erase what already existed, while also leveraging whatever supernatural – or subterranean – forces were to be found in this particular mountain." At the same time, Sognnes writes that this is an anomaly as it is more common for Bronze Age carvings to be placed alongside older carvings in a respectful manner.

Sognnes has also studied the depiction of lurs, musical instruments cast in bronze, in Nordic petroglyphs and has identified upwards of 50 lurs among the Bardal field's boat carvings. Some of the aforementioned “crew lines” are longer than the others, and these elongated, curved lines are interpreted as lurs. Generally speaking, lur players are depicted in pairs. Sognnes interprets the lur players at Bardal as suggesting that this was a formal meeting place for people in the region.

As the shorelines were higher in the Stone Age and Bronze Age (see: post-glacial rebound), the area around the farm would have been a shallow cove where boats could dock. The farm is located on a natural terrace that would have been well suited as a gathering place, and just above the carved rock face is a rock ledge that could have constituted a stage for rituals. Sognnes therefore suggests that Bardal may have functioned as a meeting place or frontier where people from a newer seafaring culture in the midst of expansion encountered people who lived in a more traditional way. In light of this, he interprets the overlapping of carvings as the result of the seafaring people leaving a mark of their own, newer, presence.

== The area today ==
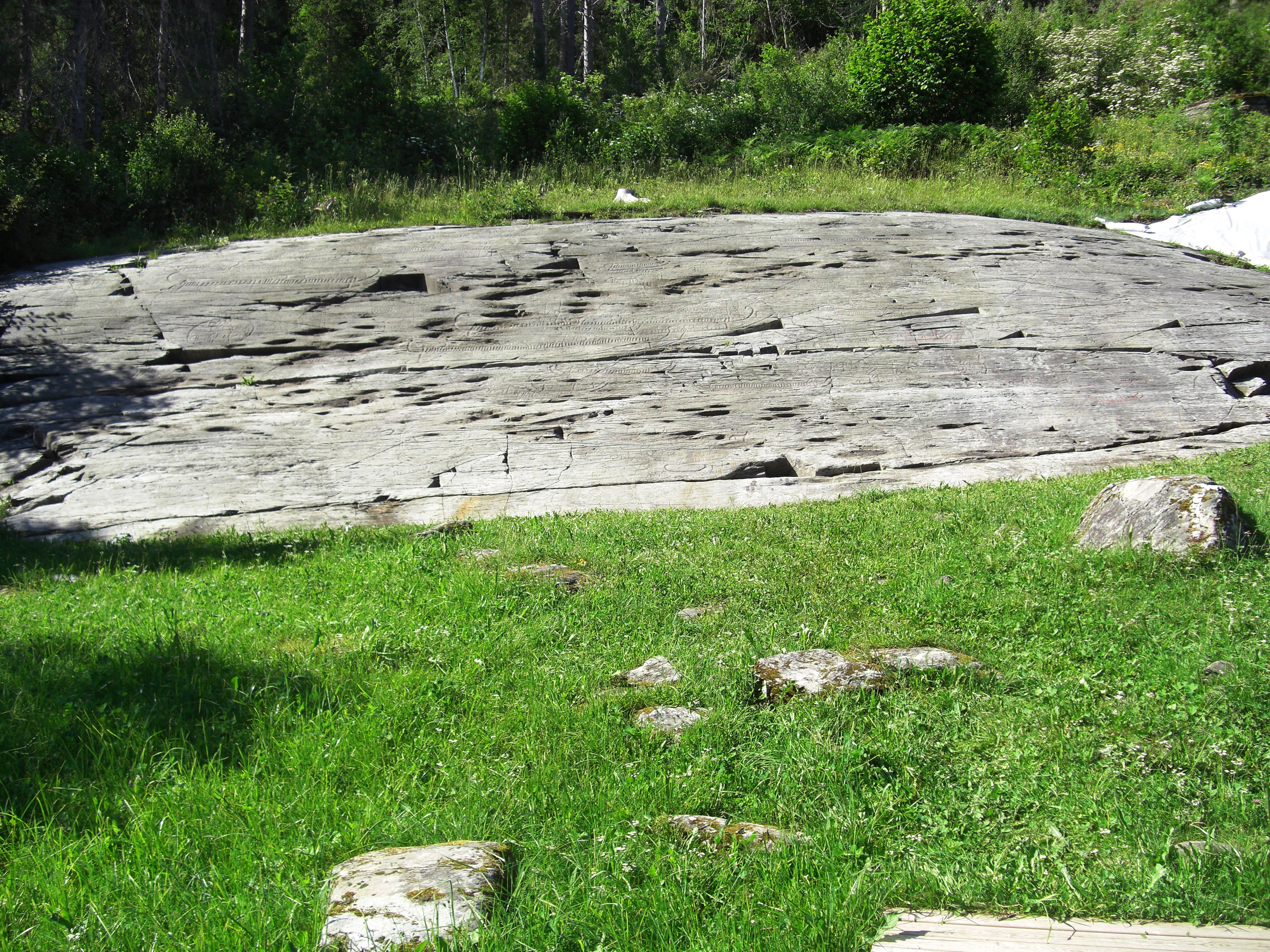
Bardal in 2010. Left section.

The Bardal field is located 11 km west of the city of Steinkjer.

The main field was made accessible for tourists in 1962. In 1951, the carvings had been painted in two colours: the hunting carvings in yellow, and the agricultural carvings in red. The purpose was to make it easier to distinguish rock art from the two eras, and the painting was refreshed in 1973. The last traces of this over-painting were removed in 2016 and 2017.

The Bardal field is mentioned in approx. 70 scholarly articles and books, partly because of the monumental figures, and partly because of the overlapping of carvings.

== See also ==
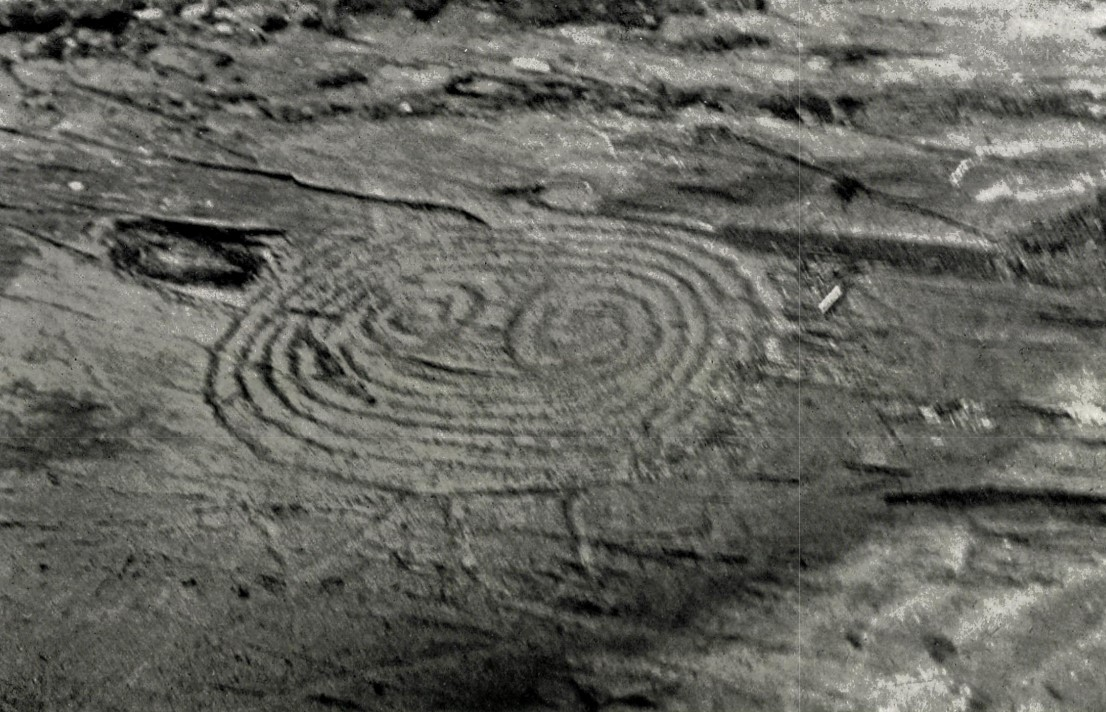
A double spiral with rings. Credit: Gutorm Gjessing

- Rock carvings in Central Norway
- Nordic Bronze Age
- Bølareinen
- Leirfall rock carvings
- Solsem cave
