= Gooch baronets of Benacre Hall (1746) =

Gooch baronets
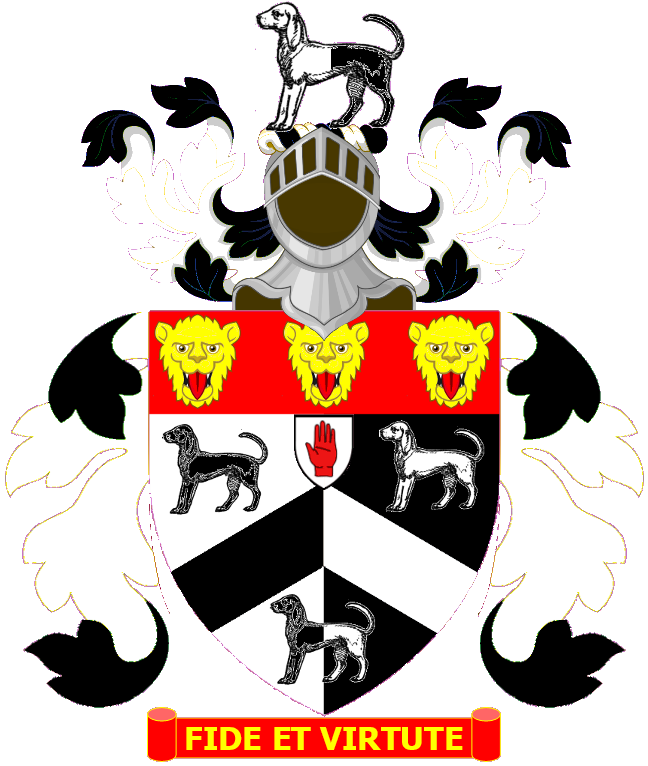
- Coat of arms of the Gooch baronets of Benacre Hall
- Creation date: 1746
- Status: extant
- Former seat: Benacre Hall
- Motto: Fide et Virtute, faith and valour
- Arms: Per pale Argent and Sable a chevron between three talbots statant all counterchanged, on a chief Gules three leopards faces Or
- Crest: A talbot statant per pale Argent and Sable

The Gooch baronetcy of Benacre Hall, in the County of Suffolk, was created in the Baronetage of Great Britain on 4 November 1746 for William Gooch, Lieutenant Governor of Virginia from 1727 to 1749. There was a special remainder to his elder brother, bishop Thomas Gooch.

The 2nd Baronet, under the special remainder, married Mary Sherlock, daughter of William Sherlock; Sherlock was adopted as a surname used as middle name in the family. The 4th Baronet served as High Sheriff of Suffolk in 1785. The 5th Baronet represented Suffolk in the House of Commons from 1806 to 1830. The 6th Baronet likewise was elected as Member of Parliament for Suffolk East between 1846 and 1856.

The 11th Baronet was a Colonel in the Army. The 13th Baronet died in 2008. He had in 2006 separated the 6,500 acres (2,600 ha) Benacre Hall estate from the baronetcy, leaving it to his widow and daughters, rather than his heir.

== Gooch baronets, of Benacre Hall (1746) ==
- Sir William Gooch, 1st Baronet (1681–1751)
- Sir Thomas Gooch, 2nd Baronet (1675–1754)
- Sir Thomas Gooch, 3rd Baronet (c. 1721–1781)
- Sir Thomas Gooch, 4th Baronet (1745–1826)
- Sir Thomas Sherlock Gooch, 5th Baronet (1767–1851)
- Sir Edward Sherlock Gooch, 6th Baronet (1802–1856)
- Sir Edward Sherlock Gooch, 7th Baronet (1843–1872)
- Sir Francis Robert Sherlock Lambert Gooch, 8th Baronet (1850–1881)
- Sir Alfred Sherlock Gooch, 9th Baronet (1851–1899)
- Sir Thomas Vere Sherlock Gooch, 10th Baronet (1881–1946)
- Sir Robert Eric Sherlock Gooch, 11th Baronet KCVO DSO (1903–1978)
- Sir (Richard) John Sherlock Gooch, 12th Baronet (1930–1999)
- Sir Timothy Robert Sherlock Gooch, 13th Baronet (1934–2008)
- Sir Arthur Brian Sherlock Heywood Gooch, 14th Baronet (born 1937). He is the son of Brian Sherlock Gooch, second son of the 10th Baronet.

The heir presumptive is the current holder's nephew, Robert Brian Sherlock Gooch (born 1976).

== Notes ==
Baronetage of Great Britain
Preceded by Danvers baronets	Gooch baronets of Benacre Hall; 4 November 1746	Succeeded by Pepperell baronets
