= Brian Gooch =

Colonel Brian Sherlock Gooch DSO TD JP (1 August 1904 – 15 April 1968) was a British Army officer of the Second World War.

Gooch was a younger son of Sir Thomas Vere Sherlock Gooch, 10th Baronet, and his wife Florence Meta Draper, and the brother of Sir Robert Gooch. He was educated at Eton and the University of Cambridge. On 12 April 1927 he was commissioned into the Suffolk Yeomanry. He saw active service in the Second World War, during which he was mentioned in dispatches and served in the 55th Anti-Tank Regiment, Royal Artillery. Gooch was Brevet-Colonel of the Suffolk Yeomany between 1944 and 1950, and in 1946 he was awarded the Distinguished Service Order.

He was appointed a Justice of the Peace in 1954. In 1956 he was High Sheriff of Suffolk and in 1958 was a Deputy Lieutenant of Suffolk.

Gooch married Monica Mary Heywood, a daughter of Nathaniel Arthur Heywood, on 6 July 1935. Together they had four children. His eldest son, Arthur Gooch, succeeded to the family baronetcy in 2008.
