= Sir Michael D'Anvers, 5th Baronet =

Baronet in England (1738–1776)

Sir Michael D'Anvers Bt
- Born: 29 September 1738
- Died: 20 August 1776 (aged 37)

Sir Michael D'Anvers (29 September 1738 – 20 August 1776) was the 5th and last baronet of the D'Anvers baronets, of Culworth.

== Education ==
D'Anvers of Culworth was educated at John Roysse's Free School in Abingdon, (now Abingdon School).

== Career ==
He was High Sheriff of Northamptonshire from 1763–64.

== Peerage ==
He succeeded his brother Sir Henry D'Anvers, 4th Baronet to the title in 1753 and is commemorated with a memorial on the north wall of the chancel at Culworth Church. He was unmarried and on his death left the estate to his sister Meriel D'Anvers.

Baronetage of England
Preceded by Henry D'Anvers	Baronet (of Culworth); 1753–1776	Extinct
Honorary titles
Preceded by Jeffery Fisher of Irchester	High Sheriff of Northamptonshire; 1763	Succeeded by Booth Williams, 3rd Baronet

== See also ==
- List of Old Abingdonians
