= Leirfall rock carvings =

- Helleristningene på Leirfall (Norwegian)
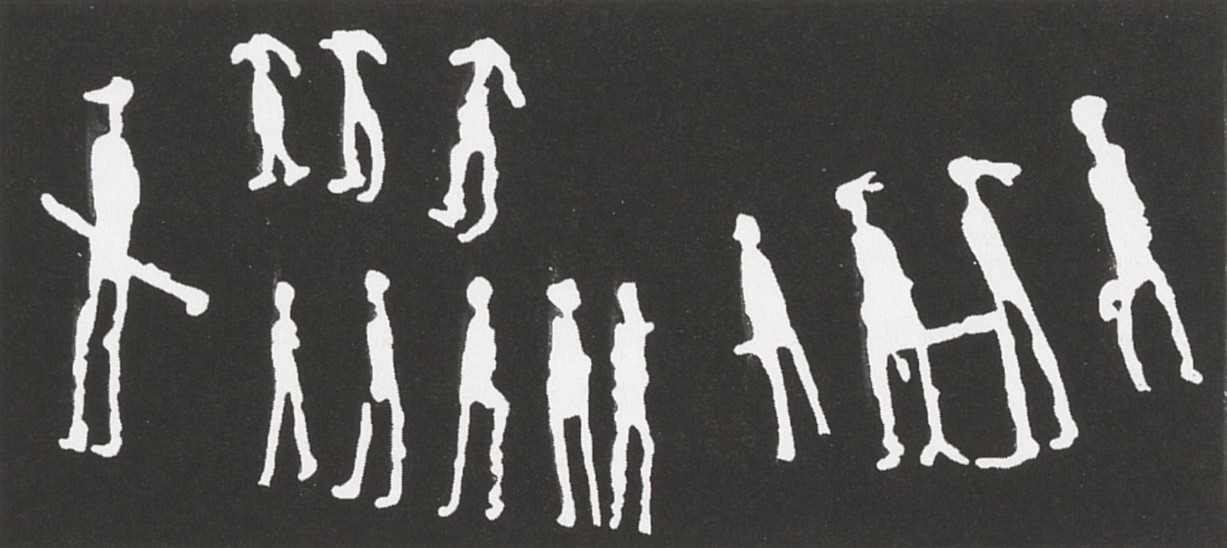
- Interactive map of Leirfall rock carvings
- Type: rock art

The Leirfall rock carvings, located in Stjørdal Municipality in Trøndelag county, Norway, are Bronze Age agricultural petroglyphs. The discovery of the site took place between 1910 and 1961. It is one of the largest collections of petroglyphs in the Nordic region, with a total of approximately 900 figures.

Leirfall is of interest both because of the large number of figures and because of the variety of motifs. The most famous of these is the procession of 13 human figures as well as the large number of footprints, both of which have been interpreted as suggestive of religious rituals. The Leirfall site also includes figures depicting the sun, horses and boats.

The rock carvings at Leirfall are part of a wider network of rock carvings in Stjørdalen (lit. 'the Stjørdal valley').

== Location and history of the find ==
The Leirfall site occupies a south-facing outcrop of rock along Solemsbekken, a stream on the north side of the Stjørdal river, close to the E14 motorway. The site lies at 35 to 50 metres above sea level.

The first of the five fields at Leirfall was discovered by farmers around 1905–1910, and was investigated by Theodor Petersen from the NTNU University Museum in 1923. Leirfall 2 was discovered in 1947.

The third field, known as the main field, was discovered in 1951 and excavated by volunteers from 1957 to 1959. Two smaller fields were discovered in 1961.

The Leirfall site was studied by Professor Sverre Marstrander of the NTNU University Museum between 1965 and 1967. His findings were published after his death by Professor Kalle Sognnes.

Leirfall is often mentioned in books about Norwegian archaeology because of its size, because it is part of the larger network of petroglyphs in the valley of Stjørdal, and because of the well-known processional group.

== Description of the figures ==
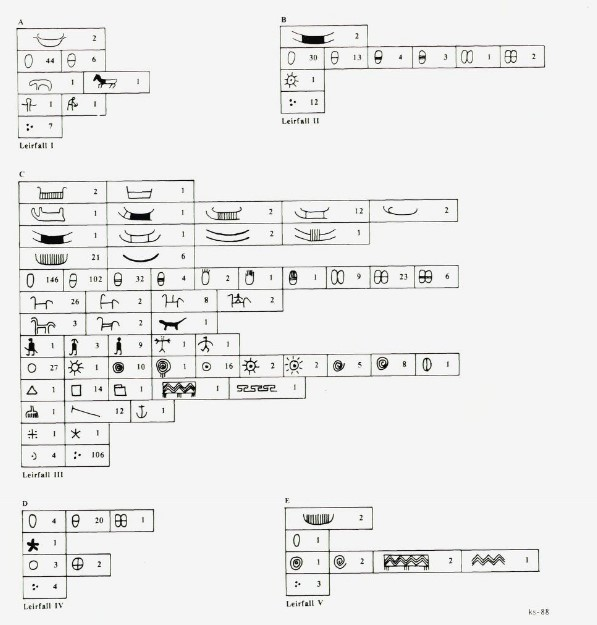
An overview of the types of figures in the five fields at Leirfall; illustration by Kalle Sognnes.

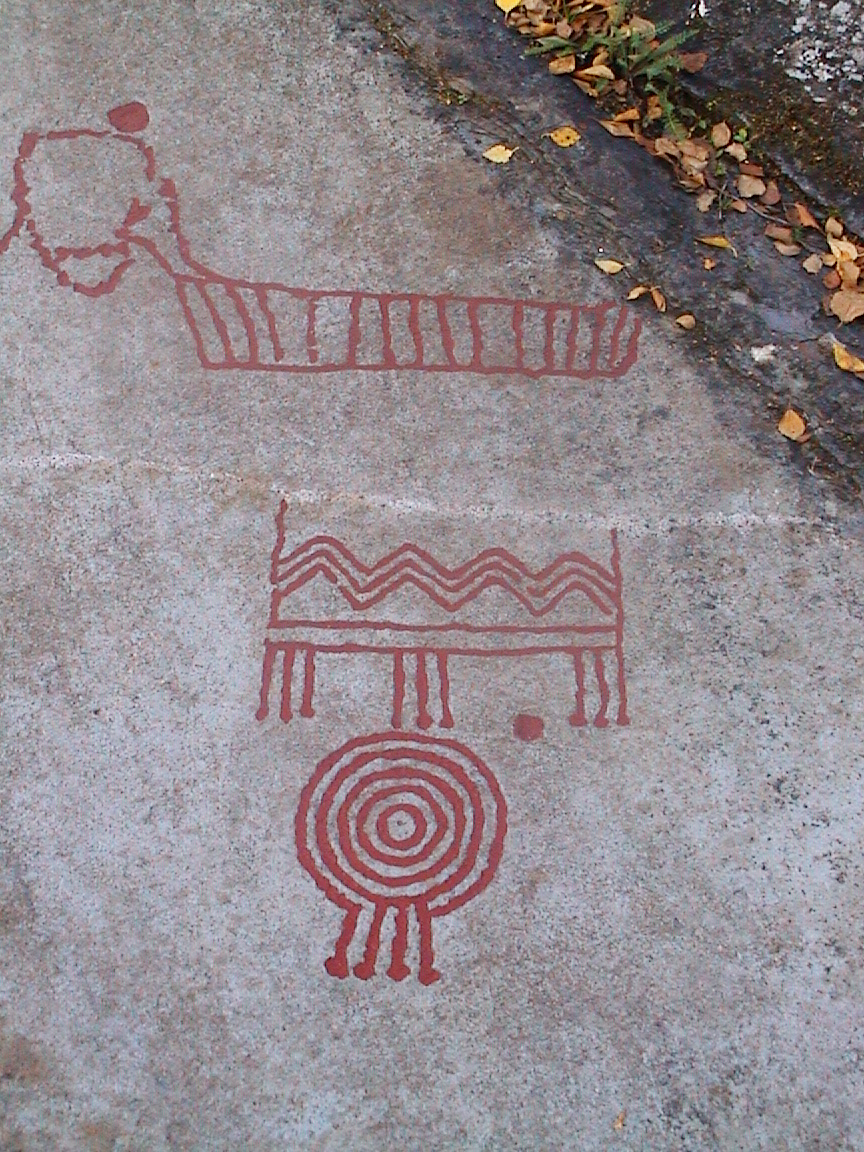
Some of the figures at Leirfall, such as this one from field 3, have motifs that are otherwise only found in grave sites.

- Leirfall 1 has around 80 figures, mostly footprints.
- Leirfall 2 has 74 figures, almost all footprints.
- Leirfall 3 is the main field at Leirfall and contains the processional group. The rock face measures 20 x 5 metres and has more than 650 figures, divided into five groups. 77% of the figures are footprints, but there are also 50 boats and 40 horses. This field was described by Marstrander in 1980 as "the most important petroglyph discovery made in Norway after 1945."
- Leirfall 4 is a small field with 35 footprints.
- Leirfall 5 is a small field with only 12 known figures.

Kalle Sognnes identified 13 different types of boats among the rock carvings at Leirfall. The people aboard the boats are mainly labelled as "mannskapsstreker" (simple lines representing crew members), but there are some instances of more sophisticated human figures. Several of the boats feature protrusions ending in animal heads, thought to be horse heads, which suggests a custom of decorating the boats during ceremonies.

The thirteen human figures are interpreted as a processional group. The leading figure is twice as tall as the others, and is the only one carrying a sword. Professor Sognnes noted that none of the human figures have arms, and theorised that this must have some significance. Perhaps the missing arms meant that the people depicted were dead. Sognnes theorises that these figures in this processional group may have been the culmination of actual processional walks.

Some of the figures at Leirfall and at the nearby petroglyph site of Bjørnstad are series of undulating lines interpreted by Sognnes as images of phosphenes, and as indications of shamanic practices.

There are also rectangular figures appearing in groups and systems, which have been interpreted as maps of the surrounding agricultural land.

== Overview and interpretations ==
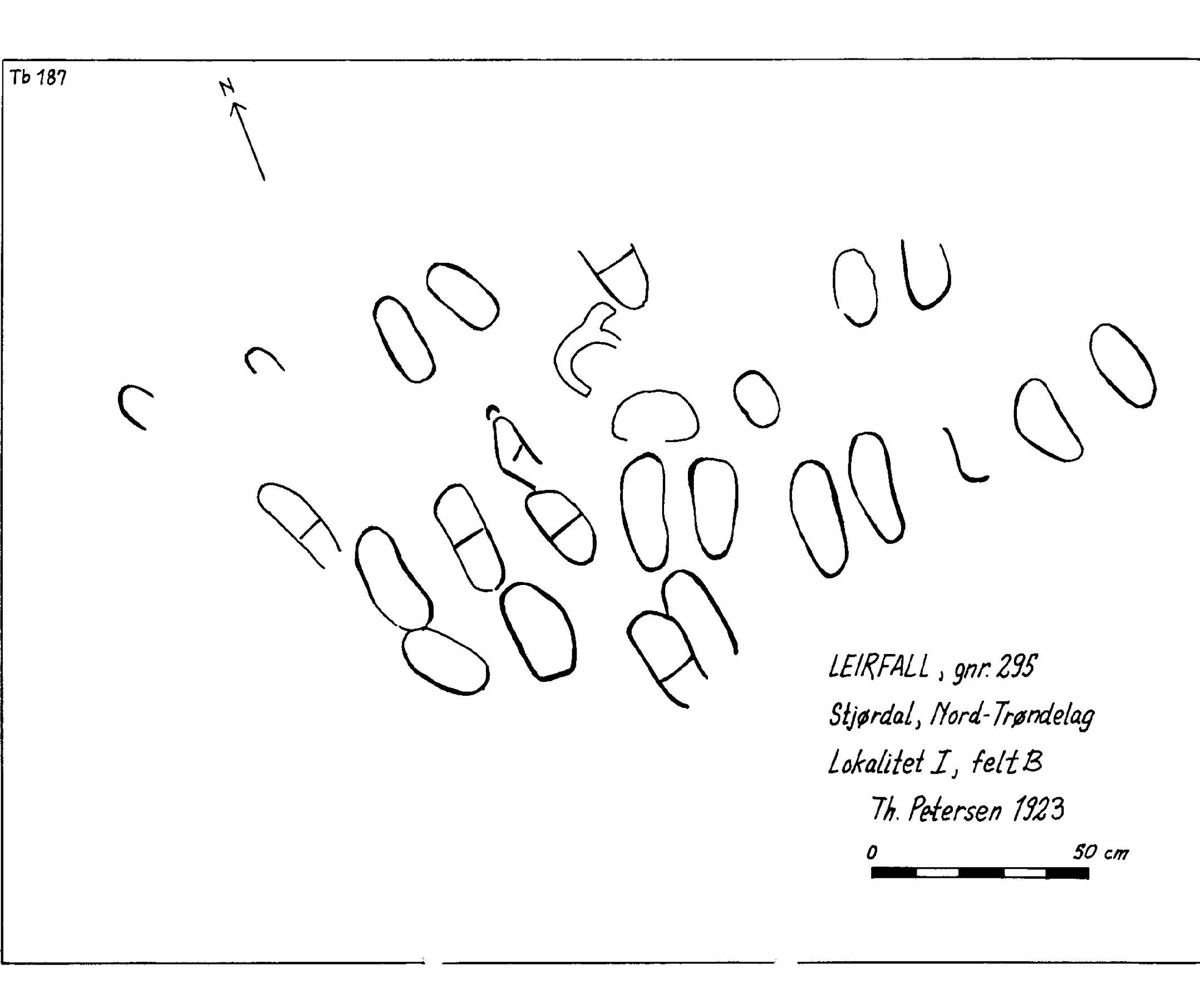
Professor Sognnes wrote that one possible interpretation of the footprints is as signs of ritual migration routes to and over the carved surfaces.

Based on his assessments of the style of the petroglyphs at Leirfall, Professor Marstrander has dated the figures as being part of "the entire Bronze Age period" (1700-500 BC). According to his analysis, the oldest boat types date to the earliest part of the Early Iron Age, while the equestrian figures are from the latter part of the Bronze Age. This means that Leirfall has been a meeting place for religious and social life for many centuries.

The Bronze and Iron Age petroglyph sites in Stjørdalen (including Leirfall) are found to occur in groupings of 2-8 sites. These groupings are spaced approximately 2 kilometres apart. This may mean that Bronze Age petroglyphs and sacred sites were associated with distinct settlements, and that each family or clan had their own mountains and rock carvings where they could carry out their rituals.

The Bronze Age boat figures have been interpreted in several ways: both as evidence of actual seafaring, and as a reference to funerary rites in which the soul of the deceased had to travel by boat to the realm of the dead. A third theory is that the boat is a vessel carrying the sun through the day and night sky.

=== Footprints ===
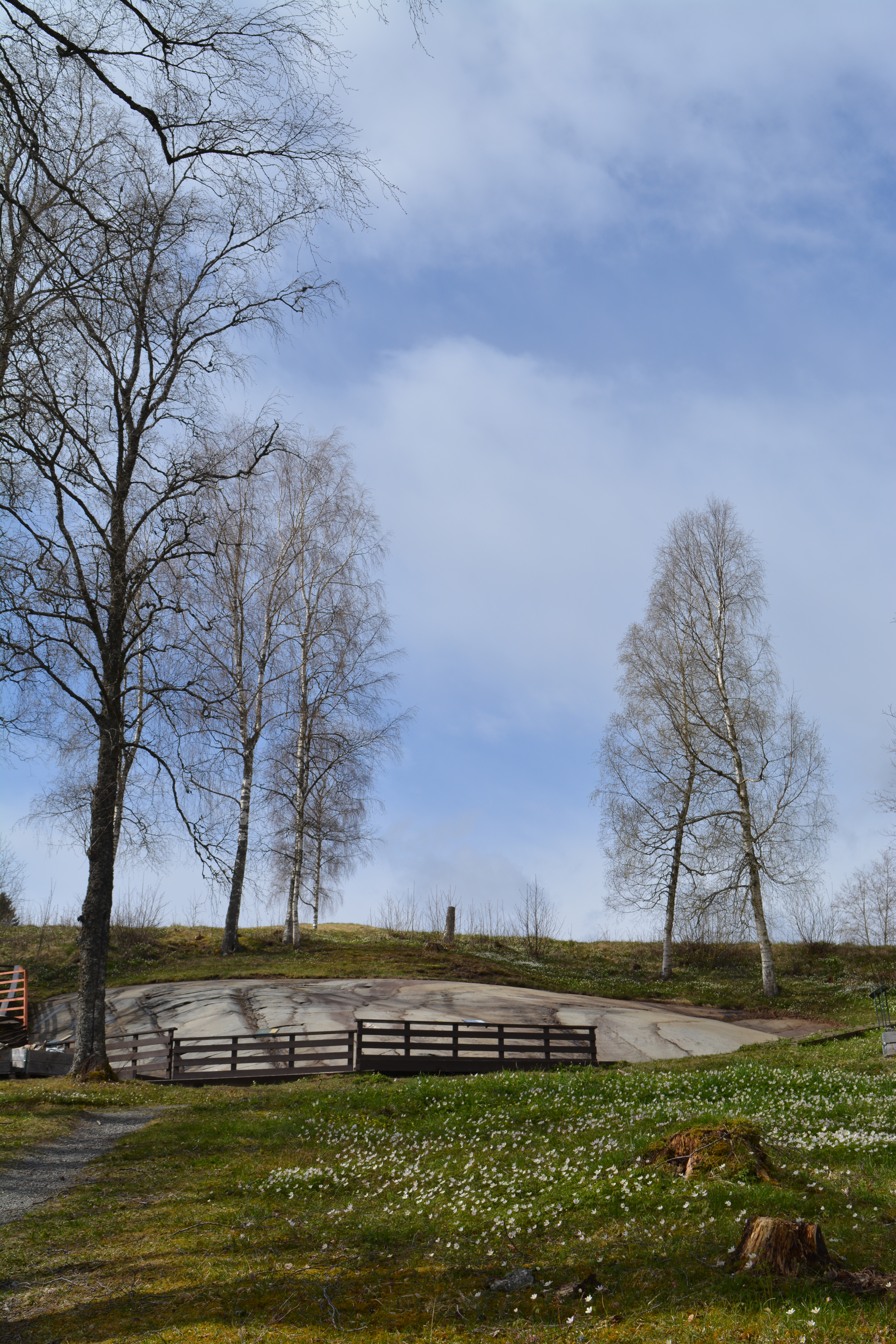
Sognnes also pointed out that the carved rock can be interpreted as a theatre or a stage where a larger audience came to watch certain rituals.

Footprints are rare in Nordic rock art, but there are many in Stjørdalen, where they account for 20 per cent of the figures. Leirfall is one of the sites with the most footprints.

These footprint figures are often divided by a line marking the boundary between heel and sole of the foot. This most likely indicates that the leather shoes of the time had laces that were wrapped around the foot and ankle to secure the shoe to the foot. Footprints have been interpreted in different ways throughout the history of archaeology: as a representation of gods, the deceased, ownership or power. Professor Sognnes has argued that, due to the sheer number of them (in the hundreds), it is difficult to defend an interpretation of the Leirfall footprints as representing gods or power.

According to Nilsen, the footprints can be interpreted as individual people's signatures, whereas Sognnes has theorised that they could be evidence of a ritual migration route passing various locations with associated topics or themes. For instance, the sexual intercourse scene depicted in field 2 could symbolise a "holy wedding", a ritual within a belief system based on fertility. Other stopping points could be linked to death and burial, and to the initiation of new generations of leaders.

Sognnes regarded the Leirfall sites as a unified and intentionally composed system of art with the smaller fields pointing in towards the main field. This theory has emerged in part through interpretation of the orientation of the footprints. In an article in the academic journal Viking, Sognnes considered the possibility that Leirfall was used in connection with fertility or funeral rituals. He pointed out that the site was used over a long period of time, and that many years probably passed between new figures were carved into the rock face. This suggests that the fields were used for burials rather than for the annual fertility rituals.

Sognnes believed that the rock faces in question can be interpreted as a theatre or a stage where a larger audience came to watch certain rituals. This reinforces the idea that the figures are a symbol of actual processions and rituals that were performed here.

== The area today ==
The area with the petroglyphs has been property of the Norwegian state since 1972. There is signage and parking at the site.

== See also ==
- Rock carvings in Central Norway
- Nordic Bronze Age
- Bølareinen
- Bardal rock carvings
- Solsem cave

== Literature ==
- Sverre Marstrander (1970). "A new discovered rock-carving of Bronze Age type in Central Norway". Valcamonica Symposium. Acts of the international symposium on prehistoric art. 1968. Centro Camuno di Studi Preistorici. pp. 261–268. Reprinted in the anthology Hundre års bergkunstforskning i Midt-Norge. NTNU University Museum. 2007. pp. 145–151.
- Turid Brox Nilsen (2005). Vedrørende en bergkunstlokalitet i Stjørdalen : en kasusstudie av Leirfallristningene, med fokus på kronologi og tolkning. MA thesis in archeology, NTNU 2005
- Turid Brox Nilsen (2009). "Fotnoter : om fotspor-ristninger i Stjørdalen". Viking. pp. 39–48.
- Kalle Sognnes (1987). "Rock art and settlement pattern in the Bronze age. Example from Stjørdal, Trøndelag, Norway". Norwegian Archaeological Review. pp. 110–119. doi:10.1080/00293652.1987.9965457. Reprinted in the anthology Hundre års bergkunstforskning i Midt-Norge. NTNU University Museum. 2007.
- Kalle Sognnes (1992). "Rock Art Museum in Trøndelag : a plan for Displaying and Protecting Rock Art". Conservation, preservation and presentation of rock art. Bergen: Historisk museum. pp. 81–90.
- Kalle Sognnes (2001). Prehistoric Imagery and Landscapes : Rock art in Stjørdal, Trøndelag, Norway. BAR publishing.
- Kalle Sognnes (2011). "These rocks were made for walking : rock art at Leirfall, Trøndelag, Norway". Oxford journal of archaeology. pp. 185–205.
