= Thomas Gooch (disambiguation) =

Sir Thomas Gooch, 2nd Baronet (1674–1754) was an English bishop.

Thomas Gooch may also refer to:

- Thomas Longridge Gooch (1808–1882), civil engineer
- Sir Thomas Gooch, 3rd Baronet (c. 1721–1781), of the Gooch baronets
- Sir Thomas Gooch, 4th Baronet (1745–1826), of the Gooch baronets
- Sir Thomas Gooch, 5th Baronet (1767–1851), of the Gooch baronets, MP for Suffolk
- Sir Thomas Vere Sherlock Gooch, 10th Baronet (1881–1946), of the Gooch baronets
- Thomas Gooch (artist) (1750–1802), English artist

== See also ==
- Gooch (disambiguation)
