= Sir Henry D'Anvers, 4th Baronet =

Sir Henry D'Anvers Bt
- Born: 1731
- Died: 13 August 1758 (aged 22)

Sir Henry D'Anvers (1731 – 13 August 1758) was the 4th baronet of the D'Anvers baronets, of Culworth.

== Education ==
D'Anvers of Culworth was educated at John Roysse's Free School in Abingdon, (now Abingdon School) and later Lincoln College, Oxford.

He was a Steward of the OA Club in 1753.

== Peerage ==
He succeeded Sir John Danvers, 3rd Baronet, to the title in 1744 and is commemorated with a memorial on the north wall of the chancel at Culworth Church. On his death the title went to his brother Sir Michael D'Anvers, 5th Baronet.

Baronetage of England
Preceded by John Danvers	Baronets (of Culworth); 1744–1753	Succeeded by Michael D'Anvers

== See also ==
- List of Old Abingdonians
