= Daniel Gooch (disambiguation) =

Daniel Gooch is the name of:

- Daniel Gooch (1816–1889), Chairman of the Great Western Railway
- Daniel Linn Gooch (1853–1913), U.S. Representative from Kentucky
- Daniel W. Gooch (1820–1891), U.S. Representative from Massachusetts
- Daniel Gooch (1869–1926), dog handler for the Imperial Trans-Antarctic Expedition and grandson of the railway pioneer

== See also ==
- Gooch (disambiguation), for other people using this name.
