= Sir Timothy Gooch, 13th Baronet =

Sir Timothy Robert Sherlock Gooch, 13th Baronet MBE DL (7 December 1934 – 9 April 2008), of Benacre Hall, was a British army officer and landowner, with an estate of some 7,000 acres in Suffolk.

He was a younger son of Colonel Sir Robert Gooch, 11th Baronet, KCVO DSO and Katharine Clerveaux, a daughter of Major General Sir Edward Chaytor. Commissioned into the Life Guards, he rose to the rank of major.

In 1963, Gooch married Susan Barbara Christie, only daughter of Major General K. C. Cooper CB DSO OBE, and they had two daughters, Lucinda and Victoria. In 1999, he succeeded his older brother Sir John Gooch as baronet and as owner of the Benacre Hall estate, running along the east coast of Suffolk from South Kessingland to Easton.

Gooch died on 9 April 2008 and was succeeded as head of the family by a cousin, Brigadier Arthur Gooch. However, he separated the 7,000-acre estate from the baronetcy, leaving it to his widow and daughters, rather than his heir, who was then aged over seventy and also had only daughters.

== Notes ==
Coat of arms of Sir Timothy Gooch, 13th Baronet
Crest A talbot statant per pale Argent and Sable Escutcheon Per pale Argent and Sable a chevron between three talbots statant all counterchanged, on a chief Gules three leopards' faces Or Motto Fide et Virtute

Baronetage of Great Britain
Preceded by (Richard) John Sherlock Gooch	Baronet (of Benacre Hall); 1999–2008	Succeeded by Arthur Brian Sherlock Heywood Gooch
