= Stan Gooch =

British psychologist & writer (1932-2010)

- Born: 13 June 1932; Lewisham, London
- Died: 13 September 2010 (aged 78); Swansea, Wales
- Occupation: Author
- Writing career
- Period: 1972–2010
- Genre: Non-fiction
- Notable work: The Paranormal

Stanley Albert Gooch (born 1932 in Lewisham, London, died 13 September 2010) was a British psychologist and author who is probably best known as the proponent of a "hybrid-origin theory" of human evolution.

== Publications ==
=== Total Man ===
Gooch's first book Total Man (1972) was an attempt to examine all fields of interest relevant to humans today. On the back cover of the American print of Total Man Stan Gooch states:

"Essentially, the view I have taken of other 'theories of personality', such as those of Marx, Christianity, Freud, Pavlov, Nietzsche and many others, is not that all, or all but one, are wrong, but on the contrary that all are correct. I was, and am still, unable to escape the implications of the fact that each of the theorists in question was, after all, concerned with one and the same human being. Instead of rejecting all such views, I found myself essentially rejecting none. This shift of emphasis is, I believe, crucial. The task is changed from one of selection to one of assembly."

=== Theory of polarities ===
In various chapters of Total Man Gooch outlined what would become the basis of his theories when he showed that phenomena can be divided into two columns, which he titled System A and System B, later associated with Cro-Magnon and Neanderthal lineage, respectively. These could be roughly equated to Freud's Ego and Id, and in some ways Carl Jung's Male and Female principles.

System A	System B
Sun	Moon
Psychosis	Neurosis
Logic	Intuition
Science	Religion
Awake	Dreaming
Adult	Child
Day	Night
God	Devil
Male	Female
Yang	Yin
Fascism	Communism

=== Hybrid-origin theory ===
Total Man was followed by Personality and Evolution (1973) and The Neanderthal Question (1977). In these books, Gooch develops what would become known as the "hybrid-origin theory". The theory as represented in Guardians of the Ancient Wisdom (1979) can be outlined as follows:

1. From other human species, Cro-Magnon man evolves in Northern India during a long period of isolation, develops and practices sun worship and hunting magic; the culture is patriarchal.
2. Elsewhere during the same period, different forms of Neanderthal man evolve in Europe and the Middle East, while moon worship and earth magic is developed and practiced; the culture is matriarchal.
3. Around 35,000 years ago, Cro-Magnon abandons India and heads west through the Middle East into Europe, overrunning Neanderthal. By 25,000 years ago, the predominant type in Europe is Cro-Magnon.
4. In the Middle East a hybrid population, a cross between the Cro-Magnon and Neanderthal types, emerges. Pure Neanderthal has largely ceased to exist either here or in Europe.
5. By 15,000 years ago, pure Cro-Magnon man has also ceased to exist, driven out of north and west Europe, into southern Europe, by renewed glaciation, absorbed by the hybrid type (that is, modern Homo sapiens).

Gooch continued to develop the theory during the 1980s, 1990s and 2000s in Cities of Dreams (1989, 1995), and The Neanderthal Legacy (2008).

=== The Paranormal ===
In The Paranormal (1978), Gooch reveals that prior to obtaining a degree in psychology, in his mid-twenties, he had been trained as a medium. The book in a first part deals with his own paranormal experiences and those of his acquaintances and in a second part presents a theoretical examination of the paranormal.

=== The Double Helix of the Mind ===
In The Double Helix of the Mind (1980), Gooch criticizes the hemisphere model of the human brain. Gooch develops the theory that the cerebellum, rather than the right hemisphere of the brain, is responsible for dreaming, creativity and paranormal experience.

== Reception ==
Gooch's theories have generally been dismissed by academia. In his book Right Hand, Left Hand: The Origins of Asymmetry in Brains, Bodies, Atoms and Cultures, Chris McManus, a psychologist at University College London, has described Stan Gooch's ideas about the origins of left-handedness as "myths", stating that they lack any supporting evidence. Thinker and novelist Colin Wilson, on the other hand, argues that Gooch's work forms "one of the most impressive and exciting intellectual structures of the second half of the twentieth century."

== Bibliography ==
- Four Years On co-authored with M.L. Kellmer-Pringle (1970)
- Total Man: An Evolutionary Theory of Personality (1972)
- Personality and Evolution: The Biology of the Divided Self (1973)
- The Neanderthal Question (1977)
- The Paranormal (1978)
- Alternative Persons: Entities of Science-fiction and Myth (1979)
- Guardians of the Ancient Wisdom (1980), re-published as The Dream culture of the Neanderthals (2006)
- The Double Helix of the Mind: The Secrets of Mental Evolution and Advance (1980)
- The Secret Life of Humans (1981)
- Science Fiction as Religion co-authored with Christopher Evans (1981)
- Creatures from Inner Space (1984), re-published as The Origins of Psychic Phenomena (2007)
- The Child With Asthma co-authored with Rosemary Dinnage (1986)
- Cities of Dreams (1989)
- The Neanderthal Legacy (2008)
