= Rock carvings in Central Norway =

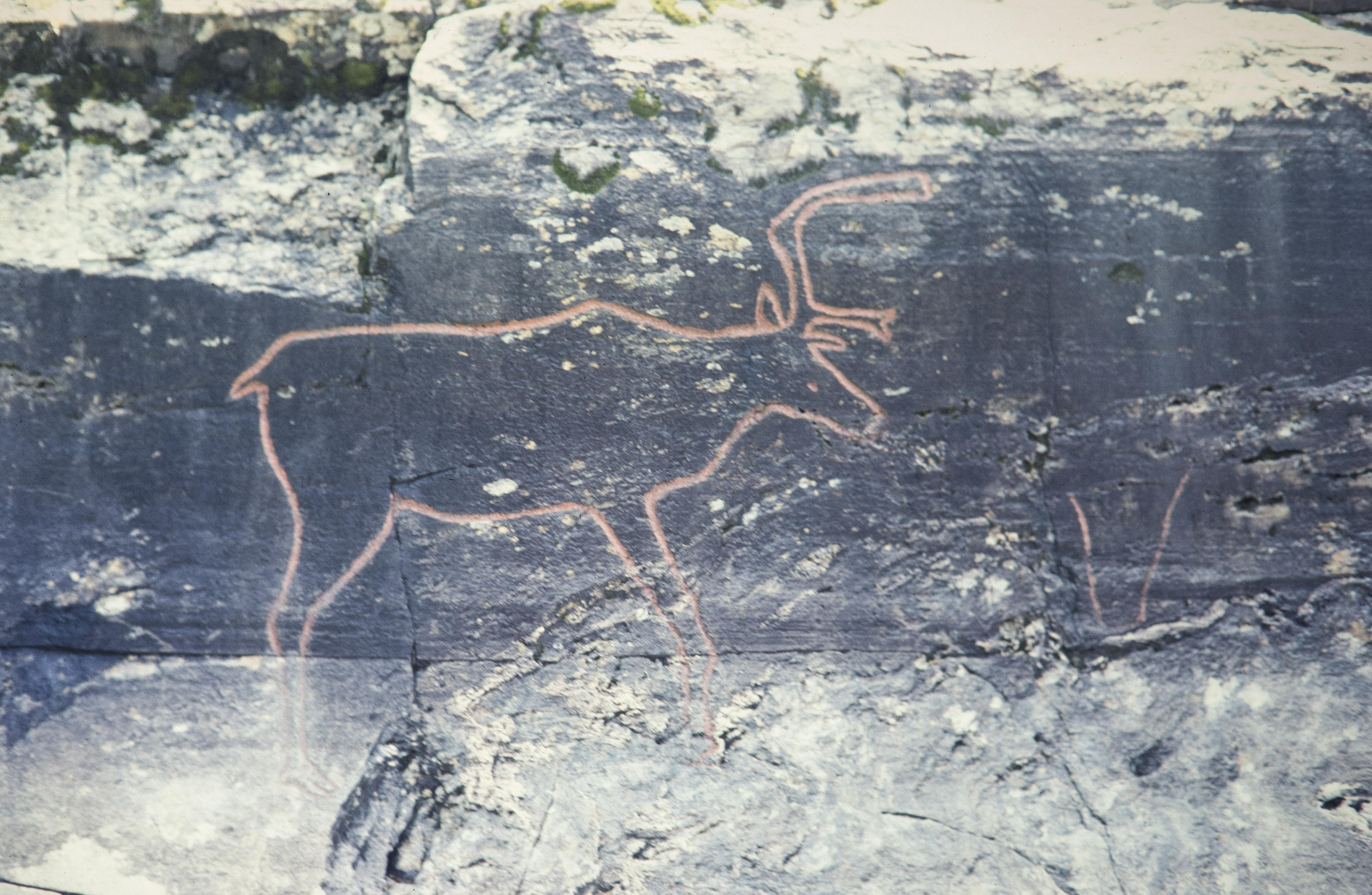
Bølareinen (The Bøla reindeer) in Steinkjer.

Central Norway is a region in Norway, comprising Trøndelag as well as parts of the Nordland and Møre og Romsdal counties.

This region of Norway contains approximately 300 rock carving and rock painting sites from the Stone Age and Bronze Age. The petroglyph sites are much more plentiful than the rock painting sites. The prehistoric art of this area is not as well known as the more popular rock carving sites of Scandinavia, such as the Rock carvings at Alta, the Nämforsen rock art site, or the many petroglyph sites in Bohuslän, Sweden - but in recent years the amount of research into this corpus has increased, due largely to the work of professor Kalle Sognnes at the Norwegian University of Science and Technology in Trondheim.

== Two kinds of rock art ==
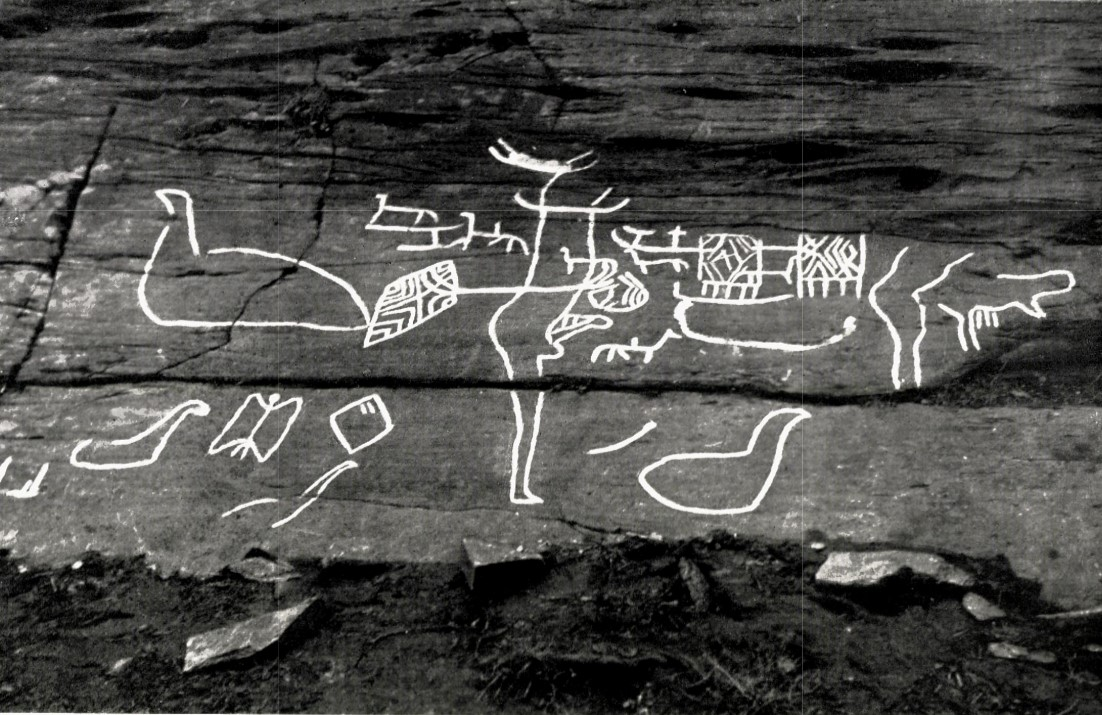
The Bardal rock carvings contains images from both of the rock carving traditions.

Scandinavian rock art comprise two categories. The first type dates to the Stone Age (in Norway from between 8000-1800 BCE), and usually depicts mammals such as elk, red deer and reindeer, but also brown bears, whales and porpoises. It also depicts fish such as halibut and salmon, as well as birds. There are also examples of boats, humans and various geometrical figures. These rock carvings were probably made by people who used gathering, fishing and hunting as their subsistence. This type of rock art is commonly known as veideristninger (hunter's rock carvings). Since the most common motifs are hunted animals, a popular interpretation has been that the carvings were made as part of "hunter's magic" - in an attempt to gain control of the animals that were hunted.

In the later years, other interpretations have been suggested, such as the animals being totems for clans or the animals being spiritual animals seen in trance. Some sites with paintings in this style are also known.

In addition to the carved sites dating from the Stone Age, there is a series of caves on the coast of Central Norway containing painted human stick figures. As has been shown by archaeologist Hein Bjerck, these pictures are usually located in the liminal area of the cave where the natural light gives way to complete darkness. He has suggested that these pictures were part of initiation rites.

The second kind of Scandinavian rock art was made by farmers, usually in the Nordic Bronze Age, the Pre-Roman Iron Age and the Roman Iron Age (In Norway approx. 1800 BCE until AD 400). The most common motifs are the cup mark (cupule), boats, horses, people (often brandishing weapons), foot soles, wagons, and many kinds of abstract geometrical symbols (such as spirals, concentric circles etc.) Interpretations of this kind of art has usually been that of a fertility cult, with the ship being a mythical ship that is sometimes seen pulling abstract representations of the sun. Danish archaeologist Flemming Kaul has attempted to recreate a complete Bronze Age cosmology by examining illustrations on Danish bronze items. He suggests that the ships and horses seen in the carvings and on the bronze items were the sun's helpers - the horse pulling the sun across the sky during the day, and the boat bringing it back through the underworld during night-time.

== Distribution and placement in the landscape ==
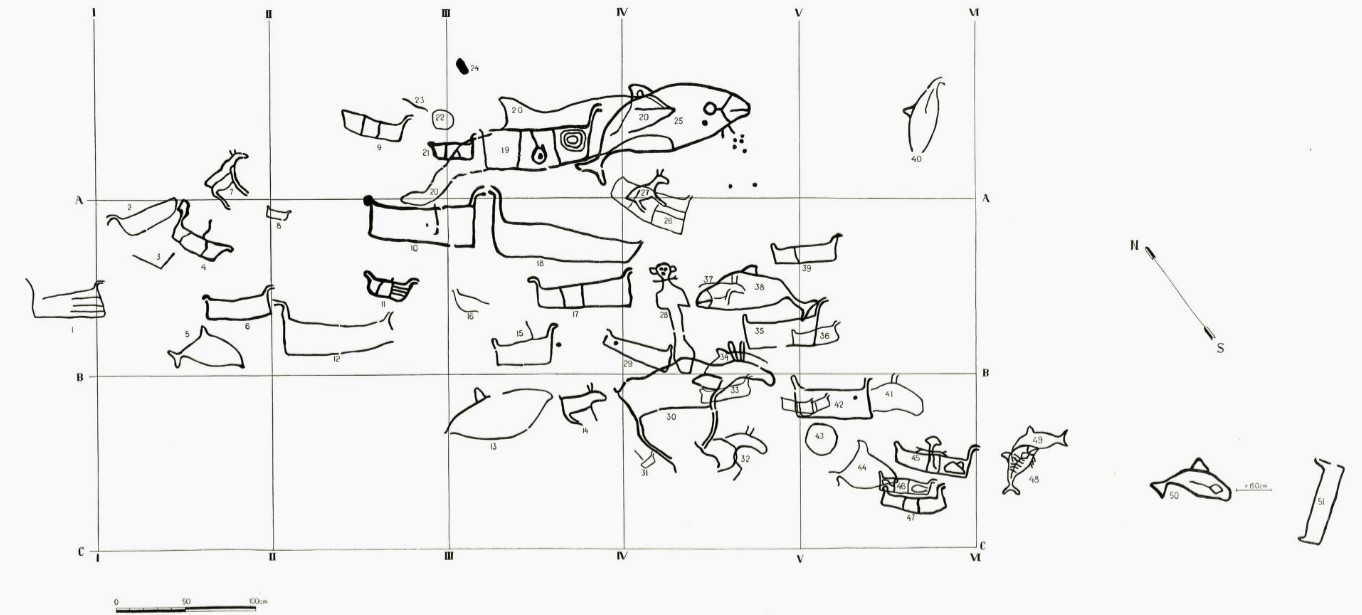
Evenhus motifs ranges from whales, elks, boats and people.

The hunter's rock carvings are often found in places with striking and highly visible natural features, such as below steep cliffs, by waterfalls etc. This was part of what led to the original hunting-magic-interpretation: supposedly the carvings were made in places where animals could easily be hunted. In Central Norway, these sites have a markedly different distribution than the Bronze Age carvings. Sites are found one by one, often in isolated places.

The Bronze Age-sites, on the other hand, are usually clustered. They are often found in places with arable land that could have been used for fields and grazing, and were probably quite close to the original settlements and farms. In Central Norway there are concentrations of these carvings mainly in Stjørdal Municipality, Steinkjer Municipality, Melhus Municipality, and around the lake Selbusjø. Certain solitary sites also exists.

== Sites open to the public ==
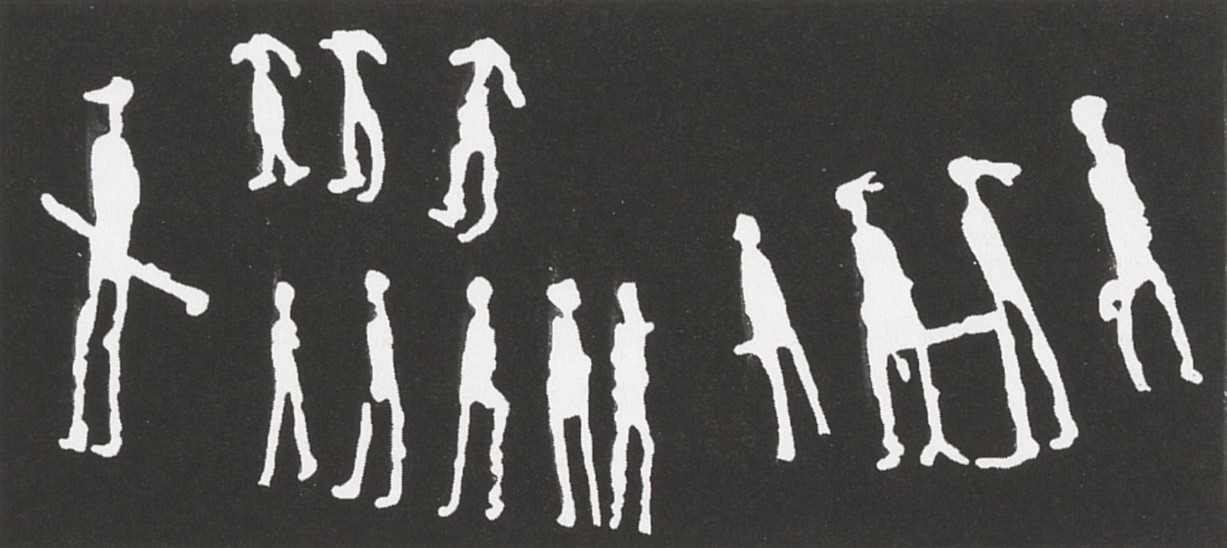
Leirfall procession group.

Most of the rock-art sites in Central Norway, and indeed in Scandinavia as a whole, are not meant to be visited by the public. There are no signs, no maintenance is done on the sites to keep vegetation from covering the carvings, etc. There are however some sites with information signs and parking spaces.

- The Bølareinen site is of the Stone Age type, located approximately 30 kilometres (19 mi) northeast of Steinkjer in Trøndelag. The first figure to be discovered was a naturalistic reindeer, almost life size. The placement in the landscape is striking: close to a waterfall that becomes quite large during flood season. The site was discovered in 1895, as one of the first sites of the Stone Age type in Norway. In recent years, more figures have been discovered: a bear, a person on skis, an elk, and several parts of other figures. The carvings are thought to be up to 5500 years old.
- The Bardal rock carvings site is 10 kilometres (6.2 mi) west of Steinkjer. The site is particularly interesting as it contains images from both of the rock carving traditions. There is a multitude of different motifs: boats, elks, people, abstract geometrical figures, horses, and a six meter long whale. The earliest carvings probably date to 6000-5500 BCE, while the later ones are from the period 1500-200 BCE.
- The Evenhus site on the Frosta peninsula is also from the Stone Age tradition. Motifs ranges from whales, elks, boats and people. A concentration of cup marks were probably made later, perhaps during the Bronze Age.
- Despite its uninviting name, the village of Hell (meaning "rock shelter" or "cliff overhang" in Norwegian) is a beautiful site, located near Stjørdal Municipality. It contains two large reindeer, other, smaller reindeer and an intricate, geometrical pattern. These figures could be up to 6000 years old.
- The Leirfall rock carvings is the only public site in Central Norway with only Bronze Age carvings. It lies in the centre of Stjørdal, and because of its size, might have been a ritual centre during the Bronze Age. The site is unusual in the number of figures (more than a thousand), and must have been used in several periods from about 1500 BCE until a few hundred years AD.
- The Stykket site lies near Stadsbygd on the Fosen peninsula, and can be reached by ferry from Trondheim. It dates to the Stone Age. On an almost vertical, undulating cliff face three near life size elks have been carved. In addition there is another animal which might represent a hare.

== See also ==
- Solsem cave, cave paintings at Leka
- Pre-historic art
- Petroglyph
- History of Norway
- Rock carvings at Alta (in Norway)
- Rock carvings at Tennes (in Balsfjord Municipality, Norway)
