= Danvers baronets of Swithland (1746) =

Extinct baronetcy in the Baronetage of Great Britain

Escutcheon of the Danvers baronets of Swithland

The Danvers baronetcy, of Swithland in the County of Leicester, was created in the Baronetage of Great Britain on 4 July 1746 for Joseph Danvers, Member of Parliament for Boroughbridge, Bramber and Totnes. The title became extinct on the death of the 2nd Baronet in 1796.

== Danvers baronets, of Swithland (1746) ==
- Sir Joseph Danvers, 1st Baronet (1686–1753)
- Sir John Danvers, 2nd Baronet (c. 1722–1796)

== Extended family ==
The 1st Baronet's mother Elizabeth married, secondly, John Danvers, whose Oxfordshire estates the 1st Baronet inherited. In 1895, writing about a possible connection with the first creation, Macanamara commented, of his Danvers pedigree,

Let it, however, be understood that the pedigree is that of the Buckinghamshire and Oxfordshire branches of the family, and of their ascertained descendants in the male line. The Danvers family of Leicestershire are only incidentally mentioned. I may, however, say that it seems probable that the Leicestershire family failed in the male line towards the middle of the fourteenth century, and that the recently extinct Danvers of Swithlands sprang from a younger branch of the Oxfordshire line.

Baronetage of Great Britain
Preceded by Harbord baronets	Danvers baronets of Swithland; 4 July 1746	Succeeded by Gooch baronets
