= Goochland =

Goochland may refer to:

- Goochland County, Virginia
- Goochland, Virginia
- Goochland, Kentucky
- Goochland Cave, Rockcastle County, Kentucky
