= Benacre Hall =

Country house in Suffolk, England

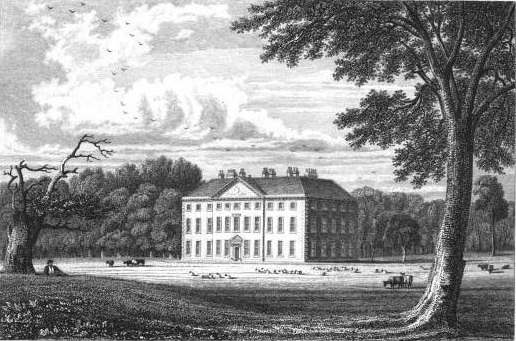
- Benacre Hall, c. 1824

- Location within Suffolk

General information
- Location: Benacre, Suffolk, England
- Coordinates: 52°23′43″N 1°40′47″E
- Completed: c.1764

Benacre Hall is a Grade II listed country house and estate in Benacre, Suffolk. The current house is high Georgian, with Palladian geometric influence and figures externally roughly as it stood on its building, in 1764. Until 2008, it was the seat of the Gooch baronets.

== History ==
In the Tudor reign of Queen Elizabeth, Benacre was a lesser possession, likely fully tenanted, of Gregory Fiennes, 10th Baron Dacre.

Henry North, of Laxfield, descended from the noble North family and purchased it in the Stuart reign of Charles I. In 1708, Edward North, dying without issue, left it to Thomas Carthew, his wife's relation, who in 1721, rebuilt the house which it is confirmed was for own use. From his son the estate was bought in 1745 by Sir Thomas Gooch, one of the successive Gooch baronets and it has remained in that family since then.

When Major Sir Timothy Gooch MBE, 13th Baronet, late the Life Guards, died on 9 April 2008, he separated the 7,000-acre family estate from the baronetcy, leaving it to his widow and daughters Lucinda and Victoria, rather than his heir Arthur Gooch, who was then aged over seventy and also had only daughters.

== Architecture ==
In 1827, Henry Davy wrote:

Benacre Hall lies on the east side of the turnpike road leading from London to Yarmouth, distant from the former one hundred and six miles, seventeen from the latter, seven from Lowestoft, and five from Southwold. The present house, which is a very good and substantial mansion, was built by the late Sir Thomas Gooch about the year 1764, from the plans of Mr. Brettingham, who was also architect for the magnificent mansion at Holkham. The entrance is on the west side, into a spacious hall; on the north is a convenient dining room and library; on the east are the principal dining and drawing rooms; and on the south, a large room called the saloon, which comprehends the whole of that front; the dimensions of this last are 48 feet by 22 feet and 16 feet high.

There are several pictures in the house, deserving of notice; among which, are, a large one of Fishermen, by Teniers; a good one of Dogs and Game, in the stile (sic) of Snyders, with the name of Elias Donck upon it, and a Gne (sic) picture of fruit, the painter unknown: these are in the principal dining room. In the library is a picture of the three Charles's, the colouring of the faces very good, and it has much the appearance of being an original; in the drawing room is a pretty picture of cattle, with the name of W. Romeyn, with some others. The family portraits are numerous, the principal of which are Bishop Gooch, Sir William Gooch, the first Baronet, Bishop Sherlock, connected with the family by marriage; Sir Thomas, the present Baronet, and his Lady, by Lane; and another of Sir Thomas, at full length, in the uniform of the Suffolk Yeomanry Cavalry, with the following inscription under it:

"Sir Thomas Gooch, Bart, was the first person who proposed to Government the raising of Yeomanry Cavalry Corps in each District or Hundred, which soon after generally took place throughout Great Britain and Ireland. Sir Thomas made this proposal in December, 1792, first through Mr. Reeves, chairman to the Association then just formed at the Crown and Anchor in the Strand, and afterwards through Sir John (now Lord) Rous, to the late Right Hon. Wm. Pitt, at that time Chancellor of the Exchequer. Lord Rous took the command of the first Troop of Loyal Suffolk Yeomanry Cavalry, in which Sir Thomas was first Lieutenant, and he is painted in the uniform of the Corps when first raised. Sir Thomas was also the first person who proposed forming Loyal Associations in the Hundreds of Blything and Wangford. Sir Thomas also raised a Corps of Volunteer Infantry, consisting of three Companies."

These last three pictures are in the upper drawing room; where there is also a striking likeness of T. S. Gooch, Esq. Sir Thomas's eldest son, and M.P. for the County, and a fine unfinished picture of Mrs. Lawson, and Mrs. S. Clissold, his two daughters, from the pencil of the late celebrated artist, George Harlow.

The possessor in the 1820s had done much towards the improvement of the property, and within a few years increased it largely, by the purchase of the estate in Wrentham, late, and for many generations, the residence of the family of Brewster.

The church of Benacre is a neat building, kept in the best repair, and contains numerous memorials of the Norths, Carthews, and Gooches, the successive proprietors of the estate.
