= Danvers baronets =

Set index for Danvers baronets

There have been two baronetcies created for persons with the surname Danvers, one in the Baronetage of England and one in the Baronetage of Great Britain. Both creations are extinct.

- Danvers baronets of Culworth (1643)
- Danvers baronets of Swithland (1746)
