= Ivor Thord-Gray =

American linguist

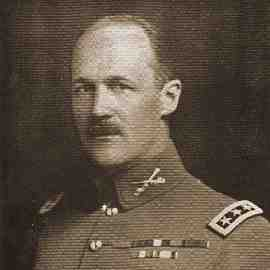
- Thord-Gray in 1914
- Born: Thord Ivar Hallström; 17 April 1878; Södermalm, Stockholm, Kingdom of Sweden
- Died: 18 August 1964 (aged 86)
- Occupations: Sailor; Soldier; Ethnologist; Linguist; Investor; Writer
- Years active: 1897–1935
- Notable work: Gringo Rebel; Från Mexicos forntid : bland tempelruiner och gudabilder (From Mexico's ancient times: among temple ruins and idols); Tarahumara-English, English-Tarahumara dictionary and an introduction to Tarahumara grammar
- Spouse: Josephine Toerge-Schaefer
- Children: 2

Ivor Thord-Gray (born Thord Ivar Hallström) (April 17, 1878 – August 18, 1964) was a Swedish-born adventurer, sailor, prison guard, soldier, government official, police officer, rubber plantation owner, ethnologist, linguist, investor, and author. He participated in thirteen wars spanning the continents of Africa, Asia, North America, and Europe.

== Early life ==
Thord Ivar Hallström was born in the Södermalm district in central Stockholm, Kingdom of Sweden as the second son of a primary school teacher, August Hallström, and his wife Hilda. His eldest brother was the artist Gunnar August Hallström (1875–1943). His youngest brother was the archaeologist Gustaf Hallström (1880–1962).

== Military service and civilian employment (1893-1919) ==
=== Africa ===
==== South Africa ====
- Joined Merchant Marine and sailed on three ships from 1893 to 1895 leaving later to settle in Cape Town, South Africa
- Worked as a Prison Guard on Robben Island in 1896
- In 1897 he enlisted in the Cape Mounted Riflemen as a Private and fought in the Boer War in 1899–1902
- Served in the South African Constabulary 1902–1903
- Transvaal Colony Civil Service 1903–1906
- Captain in the Lydenburg Militia 1904
- Joined Royston's Horse as a Lieutenant and fought in the Bambatha Rebellion 1906 being promoted Captain.

==== Kenya ====
- Captain of Nairobi Mounted Police 1907

=== Asia ===
==== Philippines ====
- Captain Philippine Constabulary ("US Foreign Legion") 1908–1909

==== Malaya ====
- Planter in Malaya 1909–1911.

==== China ====
- Served a short time in the 1911 Revolution.

=== Mexico ===
- Joined Mexican Revolution as captain and commander of Pancho Villa's artillery 1913
- Promoted Major, Lieutenant-Colonel and Colonel 1914
- Chief of Staff 1st Mexican Army 1914

=== Britain ===
- Joined British Army 1914, and served in the First World War. His initial rank was of Major and he was the second in command of 15th Battalion Northumberland Fusiliers
- Lieutenant-Colonel and Commanding officer of 11th Battalion Northumberland Fusiliers in 1915, and then 1/26th Battalion Royal Fusiliers in 1916
- Awarded 1914–15 Star, British War Medal, and Allied Victory Medal
- Lieutenant-Colonel in the Canadian Siberian Expeditionary Force, which was deployed as part of the Allied intervention in the Russian Civil War in 1918.

=== Russia ===
- Transferred to Russian "White" Army February 1919 as Colonel
- Commanding Officer of 1st Siberian Assault Division
- Major General November 1919 and High Representative of the Provisional Siberian Government to the Allied Expeditionary Corps in Vladivostok

== Back to Sweden ==
In 1923, Ivor Thord-Gray returned to Sweden and wrote a book about Mexican archeology Från Mexicos forntid: bland tempelruiner och gudabilder.

== United States ==
In 1925 Thord-Gray moved to the United States and established I.T. Gray & Co, an investment bank located at 522 Fifth Avenue in New York City. He became a citizen of the United States in 1934. He was married to Josephine Toerge-Schaefer (1925–1932) who had two children, Edward and Frances. He was subsequently married to Winnifred Ingersoll (1933–1960). In 1929, he established residence at Gray Court in Belle Haven in Greenwich, Connecticut. In August 1935 he was appointed Major-General and Chief-of-Staff to Governor David Sholtz of Florida.

In 1955, he wrote Tarahumara-English, English-Tarahumara dictionary and an introduction to Tarahumara grammar. (Coral Gables, FL, University of Miami Press, 1955). He also wrote a book about his experiences in the Mexican Revolution, Gringo Rebel: Mexico 1913–1914 (Coral Gables, FL: University of Miami Press, 1961). In later years he had his winter home in Coral Gables, Florida.

== Other sources ==
- Bojerud, Stellan Ivor Thord-Gray - Soldat under 13 fanor (Sivart Förlag AB, Stockholm. 2008) ISBN 91-85705-13-6
- Gyllenhaal, Lars & Westberg, Lennart Swedes at War (Aberjona Press, Bedford, PA, 2010), ISBN 978-0-9777563-1-5
- Langer, Joakim Mannen som hittade Tarzan (Sivart Förlag AB, Stockholm, 2008) ISBN 91-85705-12-8.
- Arrioja, Adolfo Vizcaíno El sueco que se fue con Pancho Villa (Editorial Océano de México, 2000) ISBN 970-651-402-3
- Turner, Timothy G. Bullets, Bottles and Gardenias (Southwest Press 1937)
- Tunis, Edwin Weapons: a pictorial history P61 (The Johns Hopkins University Press 1999) ISBN 978-0-8018-6229-8
