= Sir Arthur Gooch, 14th Baronet =

English baronet and retired regular officer of the British Army

Brigadier Sir Arthur Brian Sherlock Heywood Gooch, 14th Baronet, DL (born 1 June 1937) is an English baronet and retired regular officer of the British Army. He was also an aide-de-camp to Queen Elizabeth II.

Gooch is descended from Sir William Gooch, 1st Baronet, Royal Lieutenant Governor of Virginia from 1727 to 1749, for whom Goochland County, Virginia is named.

The son of Colonel Brian Sherlock Gooch DSO TD and of Monica Mary (née Heywood), Gooch was educated at Eton and Sandhurst, before serving in the Life Guards, the senior regiment of the British Army, which he commanded from 1978 to 1981.

In 1963, Gooch married Sarah Diana Rowena Perceval JP and they have two daughters. Lady Gooch has served as High Sheriff of Wiltshire.

On 14 March 1989, Gooch was appointed as aide-de-camp to Queen Elizabeth II, replacing Brigadier Robert Baddeley. He was President of the Regular Commissions Board from 1989 to 1992 and Honorary Colonel of the Kent and County of London Yeomanry from 1992 to 1999, when he was appointed a Deputy Lieutenant for Wiltshire.

When Gooch’s cousin Sir Timothy Gooch, 13th Baronet, MBE, also a Life Guards officer, died on 9 April 2008, Gooch inherited the baronetcy, but not the 7,000 acre Benacre Hall estate, which the 13th Baronet separated from the title, leaving it to his widow and daughters.

Gooch is a member of the Army and Navy Club and lives at Chitterne, Wiltshire.

The heir presumptive to the baronetcy is a nephew, Robert Brian Sherlock Gooch, born 1976, the son of Thomas Sherlock Heywood Gooch, who died in 2020.

Coat of arms of Sir Arthur Gooch, 14th Baronet
Crest A talbot statant per pale Argent and Sable. Escutcheon Per pale Argent and Sable a chevron between three talbots statant all counterchanged, on a chief Gules three leopards' faces Or. Motto Fide et Virtute

Baronetage of Great Britain
Preceded by Timothy Robert Sherlock Gooch	Baronet (of Benacre Hall); 2008–	Incumbent
