= Hunting magic =

Rituals in hunter-gatherer societies

Hunting magic is a form of magic used in hunter-gatherer societies that involves rock art in rituals to encourage a successful hunt. First observed among modern hunter-gatherers, (Note: More specifically, hunter-gatherer societies that used stone tools.) it has been offered as a hypothesis to explain the purpose of ancient rock art from a functionalist approach. Proponents have pointed to violent imagery found in some rock art alongside animals as support for the hypothesis.

Walter Burkert in Homo Necans (1972) suggested that hunting magic rituals are significant in the origin of religion.

== See also ==
- Hunting hypothesis
- Haiǁom people
- Jeffers Petroglyphs
- Rock carvings in Central Norway
- The Sorcerer (cave art)
- Great Mural Rock Art, Baja California
