= Gooch baronets of Clewer Park (1866) =

Escutcheon of the Gooch baronets of Clewer Park

The Gooch baronetcy, of Clewer Park in the County of Berkshire, was created in the Baronetage of the United Kingdom on 15 November 1866 for the mechanical engineer, businessman and politician Daniel Gooch. The baronetcy was conferred on him in recognition of his services to the successful laying of Atlantic cables in 1865 and 1866.

== List of Gooch baronets, of Clewer Park (1866) ==
- Sir Daniel Gooch, 1st Baronet (1816–1889)
- Sir Henry Daniel Gooch, 2nd Baronet (1841–1897)
- Sir Daniel Fulthorpe Gooch, 3rd Baronet (1869–1926)
- Sir Robert Douglas Gooch, 4th Baronet (1905–1989)
- Sir Trevor Sherlock Gooch, 5th Baronet (1915–2003)
- Sir Miles Peter Gooch, 6th Baronet (born 1963)

The heir presumptive is the current holder's kinsman, Peter David Gooch (born 1938).
