= Solsem cave =

Coordinates: 65.0614°N 11.5732°E

- Solsemhula (Norwegian)
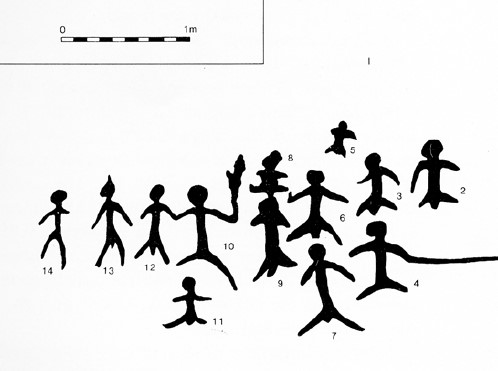
- Interactive map of Solsem cave
- Type: cave painting

The Solsem cave is a cave lying to the southwest of the island of Leka in Leka Municipality in Trøndelag county, Norway. The cave is well known for its cave paintings, which were discovered in 1912. For a long time, they were the only known cave paintings in Norway.

To date, over twenty figures have been found painted on the cave walls. The main group consists of 13 human figures to the left of a large cross. The leading interpretation is that the images either depict a type of ritual dance performed by those who used the cave, or that the figures represent the people or powers that inhabited the rock.

== Location and history ==
The cave is the result of a fault in the rock, shaped by waves and small stones. The cave itself is only 40 meters deep but because of the twists and turns inside the cave, it is still dark inside. The cave opening is 3 meters wide and faces southwest, overlooking the hamlet of Solsem.

On May 3, 1912, the cave was visited by three young men from the village. They brought with them ropes, ladders and lanterns to explore inside. Archaeologist Theodor Petersen from the Trondheim University Museum visited the site in July of the same year. A more detailed survey was carried out by Petersen and architect Claus Hjelte in 1913. Petersen wrote the first account of the find in 1914, in a festschrift honouring his colleague Karl Ditlev Rygh.

The cave was the subject of further investigations in 1916 by the Swedish archaeologist Gustaf Hallström and 1935 by the Norwegian archaeologist Gutorm Gjessing. Professor Kalle Sognnes of the University Museum in Trondheim and Terje Norsted from the Norwegian Institute for Cultural Heritage Research (NIKU) have carried out research on the cave in more recent times.

== Figures and other finds ==
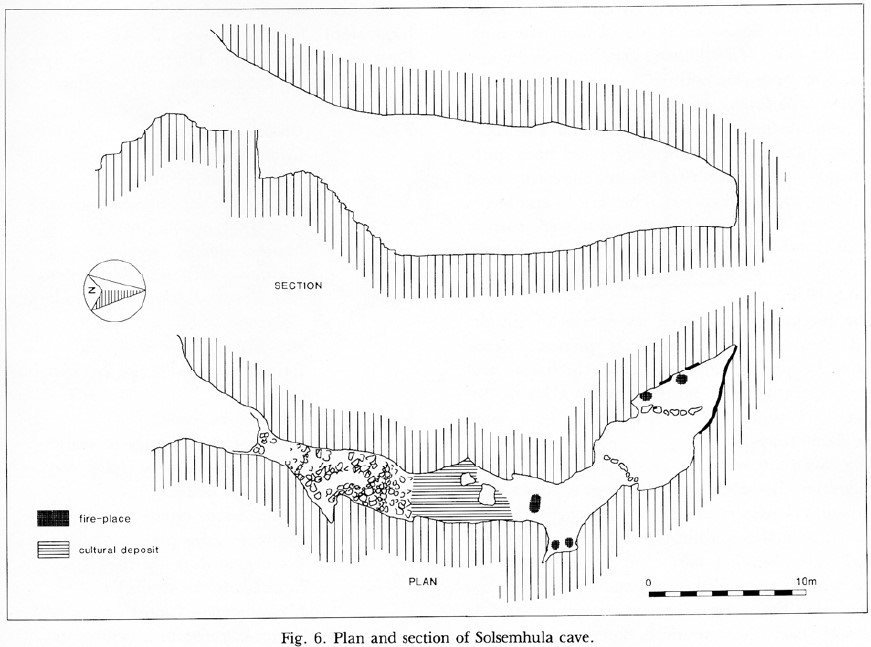
Plan and section of the cave. Solsem cave is unique in Scandinavia by both being a site for cave paintings and having a layer of occupation earth.

There are 13-14 human figures in the main group, which is located to the left of a large cross. The figures are between 30 and 100 cm tall. One of these supposed human figures has alternatively been interpreted as a club or a torch. In addition, several of the figures are described as "phallic", i.e. with a prominent penis.

All the figures in the cave are painted in red on the rock face. The colour was produced using iron oxides, most likely mixed with water.

In the middle of the cave, archaeologists have discovered a 10–20 cm thick cultural layer containing charcoal, animal bones and the remains of clams and snails. The bones belonged to various sea creatures: fish such as Atlantic cod, flatfish and Atlantic herring; several seal species; and a number of bird species including the great black-backed gull, willow grouse, common guillemot, great auk (now extinct), smew, white-tailed eagle, northern goshawk and rock dove. This array of animal bones suggests a culture that lived off of fishing and hunting both at sea and on the shoreline. The bones found also include the remains of cattle, sheep, goats and horses, animals associated with the Norwegian neolithic ("bondesteinalder") and periods that followed.

A small number of human-made cultural artefacts made of stone and bone were found in the cave: a 5 cm-long figure depicting a duck or great auk, a 9 cm-long harpoon fragment made of bone or antlers, an articulated animal bone shaped with a human face, and the knuckle of a seagull that may have been used as a whistle.

== Interpretation and dating ==
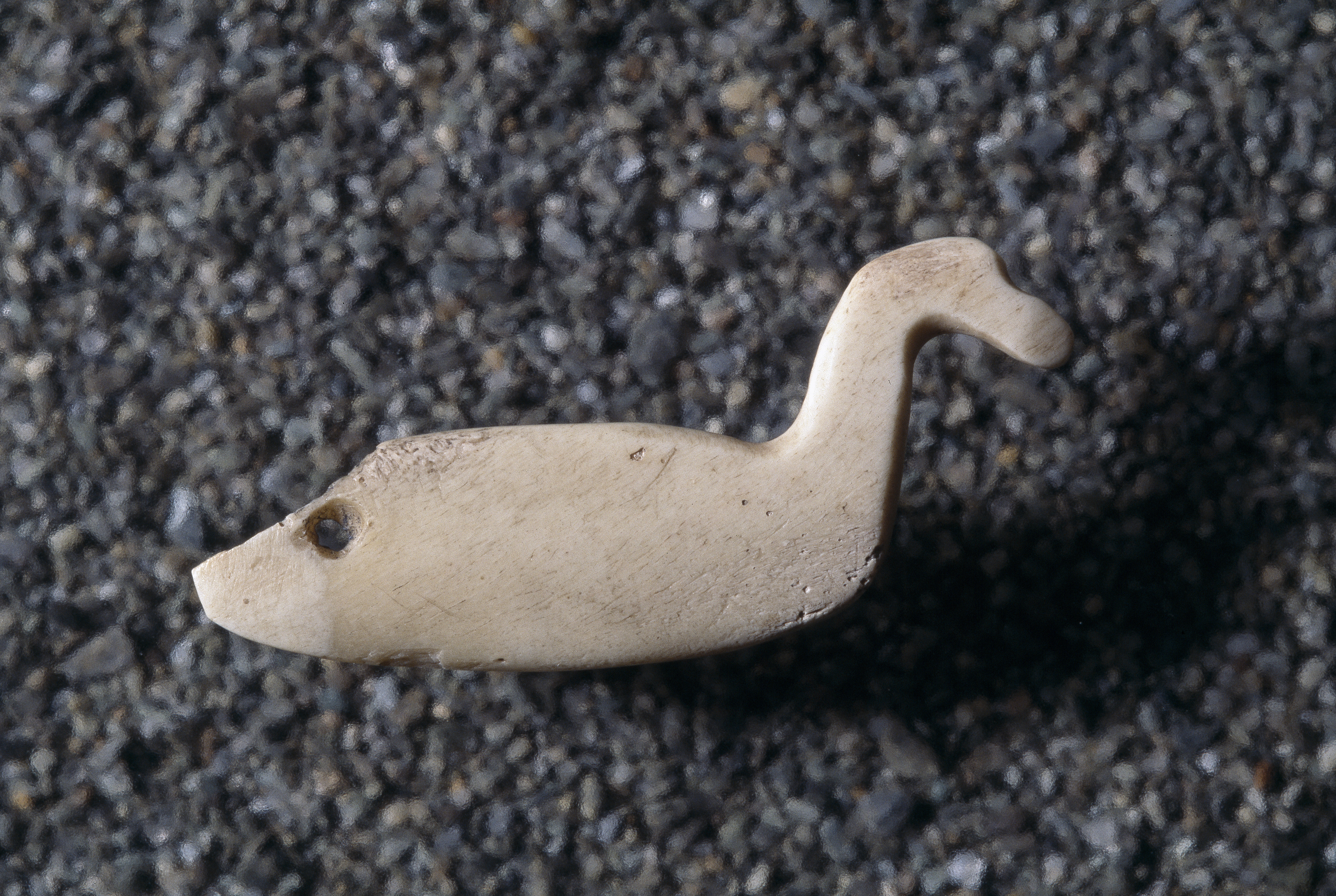
"The auk" is a 5 cm bird shaped bone figure, once considered the most beautiful piece of art from prehistoric Norway.

Theodor Petersen described the cave as a settlement site where magical rituals would also have been performed. The majority of other scholars believe that the cave could not have been a regular permanent or temporary settlement site and argue that it was used exclusively for rituals and ceremonies. Gjessing regarded both the paintings and the artefacts as "remains of a religious or magical cult." Professor Anders Hagen interpreted the paintings as depicting "ritual communal dances" and suggested that the cave had been used for "secret rituals". Professor Sverre Marstrander also emphasised the cave as a site for ceremonies related to hunting magic. In an overview of cave paintings in Norway, Hein Bjartmann Bjerck wrote that everything in this cave must be seen as a whole, and as a ritual site.

Professor Kalle Sognnes regards Solsemhula as a gathering place for a "select small group of people who [...] possessed abilities and powers that made it possible for them to face non-human entities in this subterranean otherworld." He refers to the Romanian religious historian Mircea Eliade's concept of hierophany, a place where the sacred makes its presence felt. Sognnes proposes that the cave paintings either portray a form of ritual dance performed by the cave users, or that the figures are depictions of the people or powers inhabiting the rock.

The cave has been used as a gathering place for more than fifteen hundred years. Radiocarbon dating of the bone material gives dates from the Early Bronze Age (1600 BC), Late Bronze Age (800 and 600 BC) and Pre-Roman Iron Age (250 BC). Because Solsemhula contains the first cave paintings found in Norway, it is often mentioned in discussions of other cave paintings in Norway. All known Norwegian cave paintings are located along the coast between Namdalen and Lofoten. Fingalshula in Gravvik, discovered in 1961, is locatedonly 10 kilometres from Solsemhula.

== Literature ==
- Kalle Sognnes (2009). "Art and humans in confined space: Reconsidering Solsem Cave, Norway" In: Rock Art Research 26 (1); side 83-94 (pdf)
