= Goochland, Kentucky =

Unincorporated community in Kentucky, United States

Goochland
- Unincorporated community
- Location within the state of Kentucky Goochland (the United States)
- Coordinates: 37°26′9″N 84°11′13″W
- Country: United States
- State: Kentucky
- County: Rockcastle
- Elevation: 1,030 ft (310 m)
- Time zone: UTC-5 (Eastern (EST))
  - Summer (DST): UTC-4 (EST)
- GNIS feature ID: 512339

Goochland, is an unincorporated community in Rockcastle County, Kentucky, United States.
