= Danvers baronets of Culworth (1643) =

Escutcheon of the Danvers baronets of Culworth

The Danvers baronetcy, of Culworth in the County of Northampton, was created in the Baronetage of England on 21 March 1643 for Samuel Danvers, a Royalist. In February 1644, King Charles I slept at Culworth in his house, two nights before the Battle of Cropredy Bridge. Danvers was High Sheriff of Northamptonshire in 1648. He had married in 1634 Anne Pope, daughter of Sir William Pope, Member of Parliament for Oxfordshire in 1621, and sister of Thomas Pope, 2nd Earl of Downe.

The title became extinct on the death of the 5th Baronet in 1776. The surname sometimes appears as D'Anvers.

== Danvers baronets, of Culworth (1643) ==
- Sir Samuel Danvers, 1st Baronet (1611–1682)
- Sir Pope Danvers, 2nd Baronet (1644–1712)
- Sir John Danvers, 3rd Baronet (1673–1744)
- Sir Henry Danvers, 4th Baronet (1731–1753)
- Sir Michael Danvers, 5th Baronet (1738–1776)
