= Gutorm Gjessing =

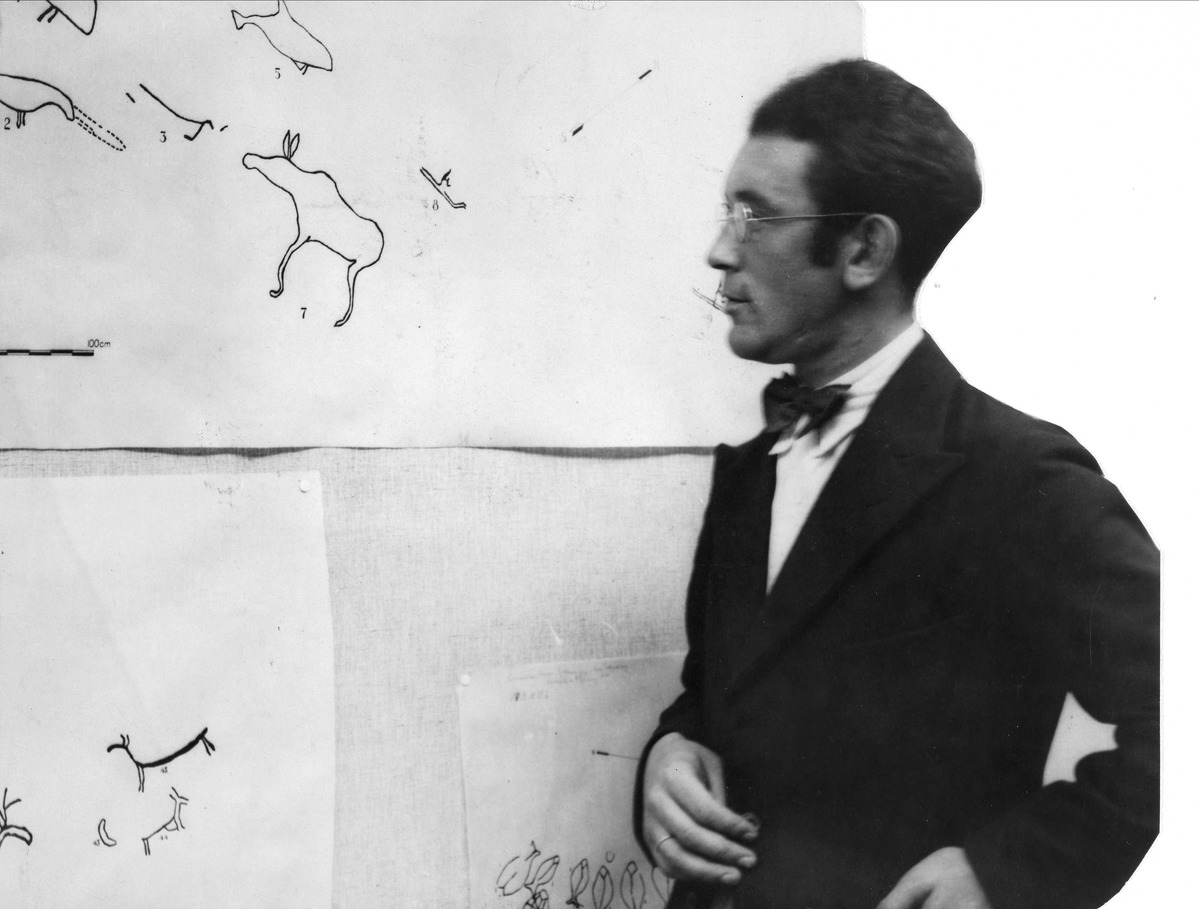
Gutorm Gjessing, 1935

Gutorm Gjessing (4 April 1906 – 27 April 1979) was a Norwegian archaeologist and ethnographer. He was director of the Ethnographic Museum at the University of Oslo and as major contributor to Circumpolar studies.

== Biography ==
Gjessing was born at Ålesund in Møre og Romsdal, Norway. He was the son of parish priest Marcus Jacob Gjessing (1871–1947) and Julie Kathrine Monrad (1877–1951).

Gjessing studied art at Oslo Cathedral School in 1924. He attended the University of Oslo where he received his Master's degree in archeology in 1931 and defended his doctoral dissertation in 1934. From 1936 to 1940 he was employed as a curator in archeology at Tromsø Museum and was curator in archeology at the university's Antiquities Collection from 1940 to 1946. In the period 1947–1973, he worked as a director of the Ethnographic Museum (now Museum of Cultural History, Oslo) at the University of Oslo.

During 1946–1947, he was in the United States as a Rockefeller Fellow. In 1952, Gjessing was invited as a guest lecturer at the London School of Economics. He was an honorary member of the Royal Anthropological Institute of Great Britain and Ireland. He was awarded the Fridtjof Nansen Prize for Outstanding Research and the Qvigstad Medal.

== Selected works ==
- Trænfunnene (1943)
- Yngre steinalder i Nord-Norge (1942)
- Norges steinalder (1945)
