= Sir Robert Gooch, 11th Baronet =

British Army officer and politician (1903–1978)

Sir Robert Gooch, Bt.
- Born: 6 May 1903
- Died: 13 November 1978 (aged 75)
- Military career
- Allegiance: United Kingdom
- Branch: British Army
- Rank: Colonel
- Commands: 1st Household Cavalry Regiment
- Conflicts: Second World War
- Awards: Knight Commander of the Royal Victorian Order; Companion of the Distinguished Service Order; Mentioned in Dispatches

Colonel Sir Robert Eric Sherlock Gooch, 11th Baronet KCVO DSO (6 May 1903 – 13 November 1978) was a British Army officer and local politician.

Gooch was the son of Sir Thomas Vere Sherlock Gooch, 10th Baronet and Florence Meta Draper. He was educated at Eton College.

After attending the Royal Military College, Sandhurst, Gooch commissioned into the Life Guards. He saw active service during the Second World War and was awarded the Distinguished Service Order in 1941. Between November 1942 and December 1944 he served as the Commanding Officer of the 1st Household Cavalry Regiment, and from 1944 to 1946 he was Colonel of the Household Cavalry.

In 1946 he served as a member of East Suffolk County Council, and on 7 July of that year he succeeded to his father's baronetcy. In 1950 he held the office of High Sheriff of Suffolk. Gooch was a member of the Honourable Corps of Gentlemen at Arms from 1950 to 1973, when he was invested as a Knight Commander of the Royal Victorian Order in the 1973 New Year Honours. In 1963 he was promoted to Clerk of the Cheque and Adjutant of the Corps, and in 1968 he became Lieutenant.

He married Katherine Clervaux Chaytor, daughter of Major General Sir Edward Chaytor and Louisa Jane Collins, on 10 November 1926. Together they had four children. Gooch was succeeded in his title by his second son, Richard.

Coat of arms of Sir Robert Gooch, 11th Baronet
Crest A talbot statant per pale Argent and Sable. Escutcheon Per pale Argent and Sable a chevron between three talbots statant all counterchanged, on a chief Gules three leopards’ faces Or. Motto Fide Et Virtute

Baronetage of Great Britain
Preceded by Thomas Vere Sherlock Gooch	Baronet (of Benacre Hall); 1946–1978	Succeeded by John Sherlock Gooch
