= Gustaf Hallström =

Swedish archaeologist and photographer

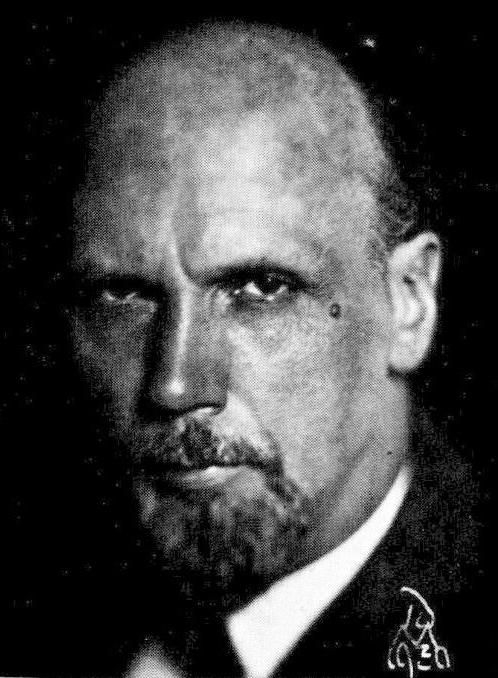
Gustaf Axel Hallström

Gustaf Axel Hallström (July 11, 1880 - October 5, 1962) was a Swedish archaeologist and photographer.

== Biography ==
He was born and died on Södermalm in Stockholm. Both of his parents were schoolteachers. His eldest brother was artist Gunnar August Hallström (1875–1943). Another one of his brothers was the soldier, adventurer and ethnologist Ivor Thord-Gray (1878–1964) .

He became a licentiate in philosophy in 1913 and an honorary doctor in 1944 at Uppsala University. He was an assistant professor at the State Historical Museum between 1909 and 1925. From 1925 until his retirement in 1945, Hallström worked as an antiquarian at the Swedish National Heritage Board.

In the course of his career, Hällstrom documented one of the largest collections of petroglyphs in Northern Europe, at Nämforsen in Ångermanland. He also took thousands of photographs documenting many aspects of Sami culture.

During World War I, Hallström was the Swedish Red Cross' delegate in Siberia in rescue operations for prisoners of war. During the Finnish Civil War, he was head of the Swedish Brigade's expedition in Stockholm. In 1942, in the midst of World War II, he traveled by skiis across territory in Finland and Nazi-occupied Norway. From 1925 until his retirement in 1945, he worked for the Swedish National Heritage Board.

He has also been the subject of recent controversy over his participation in scientific racism and possible sympathies for Nazi Germany.
