= Gooch baronets =

Set index for Gooch baronets

There have been two baronetcies created for persons with the surname Gooch, one in the Baronetage of Great Britain and one in the Baronetage of the United Kingdom. As of 2026 both are extant.

- Gooch baronets of Benacre Hall (1746)
- Gooch baronets of Clewer Park (1866)
