= Scheduled monuments in Greater London =

List of places in London, United Kingdom

The following is a list of Scheduled monuments in Greater London.

In the United Kingdom, a scheduled monument is a "nationally important" archaeological site or historic building that has been given protection against unauthorised change by being placed on a list (or "schedule") by the Secretary of State for Digital, Culture, Media and Sport (DCMS); Historic England takes the leading role in identifying such sites. Monuments are defined in the Ancient Monuments and Archaeological Areas Act 1979 and the National Heritage Act 1983. Scheduled monuments—sometimes referred to as scheduled ancient monuments—can also be protected through listed building procedures, and Historic England considers listed building status to be a better way of protecting buildings and standing structures. A scheduled monument that is later determined to "no longer merit scheduling" can be rescheduled.

== List ==
Name	Location	Borough	Date scheduled	Notes	Image	Entry number
Barking Abbey	80m NNW of St Margaret's Church, Barking	Barking and Dagenham	06-Feb-1954			
Second World War anti-aircraft gun emplacements, Beckton	Beckton District Park South, Beckton	Newham	18-Apr-1980			
Stratford Langthorne Abbey (part of area within precincts)	Baker's Row, West Ham	Newham	?			
Section of Roman road on Gidea Park golf course	Gidea Park Golf Course, Gidea Park	Havering	?			
Dagnam Park Farm moated site	Dagnam Park, Harold Hill	Havering	?			
Upminster Tithe Barn	Hall Lane, Upminster	Havering	05-Nov-1971	Scheduled as 'Medieval grange barn, 228m south-east of Upminster Court'; now a local museum		
Manor House moated site, East End Road, Finchley	East End Road, Finchley	Barnet	?			
Brockley Hill Romano-British pottery and settlement	Brockley Hill, Stanmore/Edgware	Barnet, Harrow	25-Jan-1974	Two non-contiguous sections on either side of Brockley Hill, along which the Barnet-Harrow border runs		
Earthworks at Old Park	Bush Hill Park Golf Club, Grange Park	Enfield	18-Jun-1946			
Medieval moated site, 408m ENE of Highland's School	Enfield Golf Club, Enfield Chase	Enfield	14-Oct-1976			
Flash Road aqueduct	Whitewebbs Park, Crews Hill	Enfield	26-Apr-1972			
Elsyng Palace	Grounds of Forty Hall, Forty Hill	Enfield	06-Apr-1967			
Moated site, Camlet Moat, Moat Wood	Trent Park, Cockfosters	Enfield	22-Mar-1949			
The Curtain Playhouse	Site bounded by Hearn Street, Curtain Road and Hewett Street, Shoreditch	Hackney	16-Aug-2019			
The Theatre Playhouse	3-5 New Inn Broadway, 5-15 New Inn Yard, 86-96 Curtain Road, Shoreditch	Hackney	14-Sep-2016	Site situated under modern buildings		
Priory and Hospital of St Mary Spital	Norton Folgate, Spitalfield	Hackney	?	Remains situated below street level.		
Fulham Palace moated site	Fulham	Hammersmith & Fulham	?			
Kensington Palace	Kensington	Kensington & Chelsea	?			
Pottery kiln in Walmer Road	Walmer Road, Notting Hill	Kensington & Chelsea	15-Mar-1966			
Hall Place	Bourne Road, Bexley	Bexley	01-May-1948			
Howbury moated site	Moat Lane, Slade Green	Bexley	29-Jul-1960			
Lesnes Abbey	Abbey Road, Abbey Wood	Bexley	04-Nov-1930			
Faesten Dic, a medieval frontier work in Joydens Wood	Joyden's Wood	Bexley	14-Jan-1955	The vast majority of this monument lies in Dartford, Kent		
Moated site at Down Barns Farm	Sharvel Lane, Northolt	Ealing	04-Jun-1952			
Hanwell flight of locks and brick boundary wall of St Bernard's Hospital	St Bernard's Hospital, Hanwell	Ealing	24-Feb-1975			
Iron Age settlement on Horsenden Hill	Sudbury Golf Club, Sudbury	Ealing	08-Mar-1976			
Medieval moated site, 454m south-west of Sudbury Golf Club House	Sudbury Golf Club, Sudbury	Ealing	08-Dec-1976			
Northolt Manor moated site	Belvue Park, Northolt	Ealing	08-Dec-1976			
Windmill Bridge	Windmill Lane Hanwell	Ealing	26-Jan-1970			
Linear earthworks in Pear Wood, West of Watling Street	Pear Wood, Stanmore	Harrow	26-Mar-1974			
Grim's Ditch: section N of Blythwood House	Pinner Green	Harrow	11-Oct-1944			
Grim's Ditch: section extending 1500yds (1370m) NE from Oxhey Lane	Grim's Dyke Golf Club, Hatch End	Harrow	11-Mar-1931			
Grim's Ditch: four linear sections between Uxbridge Road and Oxhey Lane	Hatch End	Harrow	17-Feb-1955	Made up of four non-contiguous sections		
18th century obelisk commemorating Cassivellaunus	Brockley Hill, Stanmore	Harrow	23-Feb-1977			
Headstone Manor moated site	Headstone	Harrow	05-Dec-1986	The site is now occupied by the Harrow Museum		
Pinner Hill ice house	Pinner Hill Golf Club, Pinner Green	Harrow	11-Feb-2000			
Pinner deer park, Pinner Park Farm	Headstone/Hatch End	Harrow	09-Nov-2000	Made of four non-contiguous sections		
Kempton Park Pumping Station	Hanworth	Hounslow	27-Nov-1981			
18th century garden feature at Hanworth Park	Hanworth	Hounslow	03-Feb-1953			
Chiswick House	Chiswick	Hounslow	?			
Romano-British site 1000yds (910m) W of East Bedfont parish church	Stanwell Road, East Bedfont	Hounslow	?			
Part of a causewayed enclosure, 632m north-east of Mayfield Farm	Great South-West Road, East Bedfont	Hounslow	13-Jan-1970			
Hampton Court Palace	Hampton Wick	Richmond-upon-Thames	01-Jan-1900			
Kew Palace (remains of)	Kew	Richmond-upon-Thames	01-Jan-1900			
Old Brew House, Bushy Park	Bushy Park, Teddington	Richmond-upon-Thames	23-Feb-1938			
The Shene Charterhouse	Old Deer Park, Kew	Richmond-upon-Thames	13-Mar-2015			
Park Pale, Ruislip	Ruislip Common, Ruislip	Hillingdon	28-Feb-2006			
Medieval moated site 382m south-east of Brackenbury Farm	West Ruislip	Hillingdon	08-Jul-1974			
Ickenham Manor Farm	Ickenham	Hillingdon	22-Mar-1949			
Ruislip motte and bailey	Ruislip	Hillingdon	02-Aug-1934			
Brackenbury Farm moated site 3/4 mile (1210m) NW of Ickenham church	Breakspear Road South, Ickenham	Hillingdon	27-Feb-1975			
Tudor naval storehouse at Convoy's Wharf	Deptford	Lewisham	22-Dec-2003			
Shrewsbury Barrow, Shooters Hill	Junction of Plum Lane and Brinklow Crescent, Shooter's Hill	Greenwich	07-Jan-2016			
Burial mound on Winns Common	Winn's Common, Plumstead	Greenwich	12-Aug-1975			
Greenwich Observatory	Greenwich Park, Greenwich	Greenwich	?			
Greenwich Hospital (RN College)	Greenwich Park, Greenwich	Greenwich	?			
Queen's House	Greenwich Park, Greenwich	Greenwich	?			
West Grove, Conduit House	Junction of West Grove and Hyde Vale, Blackheath	Greenwich	20-Mar-1951			
Conduit Head, Eltham	Southend Crescent, Eltham	Greenwich	20-Sep-1956			
Eltham Palace	Eltham	Greenwich	09-Oct-1981			
Romano-Celtic temple in Greenwich Park	Greenwich Park, Greenwich	Greenwich	01-Dec-2009			
Anglo-Saxon cemetery in Greenwich Park	Greenwich Park, Greenwich	Greenwich	01-Dec-2009			
Linear Training Fortification, Royal Military Repository	Royal Artillery Barracks, Woolwich	Greenwich	01-Nov-2010	Not accessible to the public.		
Greenwich Palace	Greenwich Park, Greenwich	Greenwich	22-Mar-2013			
Scadbury Manor moated site and fishponds	Scadbury Park, Chislehurst	Bromley	22-Nov-2013			
Romano-British masonry building and Saxon cemetery, Fordcroft	Bellefield Road, St Mary Cray	Bromley	05-Oct-1979			
Romano-British site, Wickham Court Farm	West Wickham	Bromley	25-Jul-1978			
Crofton Roman Villa	Crofton Road, Orpington	Bromley	30-Jul-1973	Scheduled as Orpington Roman Villa		
Camp on Keston Common	Keston Common, Keston	Bromley	23-Aug-1934			
Holwood camp	South Park, Keston	Bromley	22-Dec-1935	Traditionally known as Caesar's Camp		
Iron Age settlement and Roman villa at Warbank	Jackass Lane, Keston	Bromley	?	Not accessible to the public.		
High Elms ice house 130m south of Flint Lodge	Whitelands Wood, Green Street Green	Bromley	03-Jul-2000			
Ruxley old church	Maidstone Road, Ruxley	Bromley	24-Jan-1951			
Benedictine nunnery of St Mary, Clerkenwell	St James's Church, Clerkenwell	Islington	?	The remains lies under the church grounds		
Bell Barrow called Boadicea's Grave, 650m west of Millfield Cottage	Hampstead Heath	Camden	12-Jan-1965			
A subterranean commercial ice-well (City of Westminster), Park Crescent West	Park Crescent, Regent's Park	Westminster	28-Oct-2015			
The Chapter House and Pyx Chamber in the abbey cloisters, Westminster Abbey	Westminster Abbey, Westminster	Westminster	01-Jan-1900			
Jewel Tower	Abingdon Street, Westminster	Westminster	01-Jan-1900			
Caesar's Camp, Wimbledon Common	Wimbledon Common, Wimbledon	Merton	29-Nov-1932			
Morden Park Mound	Morden Park, Morden	Merton	13-Apr-1949			
The Augustinian Priory of St Mary at Merton	Merantun Way, Merton	Merton	17-Jan-1980	Located in a subway under the road, though generally not open to the public.		
Late Bronze Age enclosure at Queen Mary's Hospital	Carshalton	Sutton	28-Apr-1988			
Roman villa E of Beddington Park	Beddington Lane, Beddington	Sutton	30-Jun-1972	Site heavily overgrown and not accessible to the public.		
Milestone in Sutton High Street	Sutton High Street, Sutton	Sutton	17-Sep-1974			
Milestone outside No. 135 Cheam Road	Cheam Road, Cheam	Sutton	17-Sep-1974			
Milestone in Brighton Road	Brighton Road, Benhilton	Sutton	17-Sep-1974			
Dovecote, Beddington Park	Beddington	Sutton	10-Jan-1952			
Newe (or Wide) Ditch, Riddlesdown	Downs Court Road, Riddlesdown	Croydon	?			
Elmers End moated site	South Norwood Country Park	Croydon	04-Nov-1975	Heavily overgrown.		
St John the Baptist's Church gateway	Howley Road, Croydon	Croydon	27-May-1974			
Croham Hurst round barrow	Croham Hurst, South Croydon	Croydon	12-Jun-1951			
Regular aggregate field system, associated trackway and Anglo-Saxon barrow field on Farthing Down	Farthing Down	Croydon	29-Nov-1932			
Bonner Hall Bridge, Regent's Canal	Bethnal Green	Tower Hamlets	26-Jan-1976			
Three Colt Bridge, Gunmaker's Lane	Old Ford	Tower Hamlets	25-Aug-1976			
Parnell Road Bridge	Old Ford	Tower Hamlets	25-Aug-1976			
Tower Hill West	Petty Wales/Tower Hill Terrace	City of London, Tower Hamlets	30-Aug-1985			
Tower of London	Whitechapel	Tower Hamlets	01-Jan-1900			
London Wall: section from underground railway to Tower Hill	Tower Hill	Tower Hamlets	?			
Site of the launch ways of the SS Great Eastern	Land between Burrells Wharf and Bering Square, Millwall	Tower Hamlets	31-Jul-2015			
Roman Bath House, Shadwell	Wapping Lane, Shadwell	Tower Hamlets	05-Jun-2019			
London Wall: remains of medieval and Roman wall extending 75yds (68m) N from Trinity Place to railway	Crescent, City of London	City of London, Tower Hamlets	?			
The Hope Playhouse, and the remains of three further bear gardens, Bankside	Bear Gardens, Southwark	Southwark	20-Sep-2016	Two non-contiguous segments.		
Roman riverboat, 136m west of Greenwood Theatre	Guy's Hospital, Southwark	Southwark	10-Jun-1983			
Medieval moated manor house, 43m west of Cathay House	Cathay Street, Bermondsey	Southwark	26-May-1988			
Abbey buildings	Bermondsey	Southwark	?			
Remains of Winchester Palace, Clink Street and waterfront	Clink Street, Southwark	Southwark	08-May-1951			
Pumping engine house for Brunel's Thames tunnel	Rotherhithe	Southwark	14-Dec-1976			
The Rose Theatre, Rose Court	Rose Alley, Southwark	Southwark	28-Feb-1992			
The Globe Theatre	Old Theatre Square, Southwark	Southwark	13-Dec-1989			
Romano-British bath house and medieval remains at 11-15 Borough High Street	Borough High Street, Southwark	Southwark	31-Mar-2015	Remains under street level.		
Ivy Conduit, Coombe	Coombe	Kingston upon Thames	?			
Brick reservoir 300yds (270m) SW of Gallows Conduit	Coombe	Kingston upon Thames	15-Mar-1966			
Clattern Bridge	Kingston upon Thames	Kingston upon Thames	16-Feb-1938			
Gallows Conduit, Coombe	Coombe	Kingston upon Thames	?	Consists of two non-contiguous sections.		
Coombe Conduit	Coombe West Lane, Coombe	Kingston upon Thames	?			
Castle Hill earthwork	Horton Country Park, Chessington	Kingston upon Thames	30-Nov-1925			
Surrey Iron Railway embankment, approximately 130m south west of Lion Green Road	Lion Green Lane, Coulsdon	Croydon	27-Jul-2009			
Group of four World War II fighter pens at the former airfield of RAF Kenley	RAF Kenley, Kenley	Croydon	06-Sep-2004			
Group of seven World War II fighter pens at the former airfield of RAF Kenley	RAF Kenley, Kenley	Croydon	06-Sep-2004			
Baynard's Castle	White Lion Hill	City of London	16-Jun-1976	Remains lie under the modern Baynard House.		
Remains of St Pancras Church	Pancras Lane	City of London	08-Jan-1979	Site marked with blue plaque.		
Huggin Hill Roman bath house	Huggin Hill	City of London	06-Jun-1986			
Structures of archaeological interest below Billingsgate Market	Lower Thames Street	City of London	20-Dec-1973	Remains below ground.		
Queenhithe dock	Queenhithe	City of London	18-Oct-1973			
Smiths' Wharf	Queenhithe	City of London	20-Nov-1973			
Roman governor's palace (site of)	Below Cannon Street Station	City of London	?			
Site of The London Greyfriars	Newgate Street	City of London	22-Oct-1974			
Goldsmiths' Hall	Junction of Foster Lane and Gresham Street	City of London	07-Jan-1972			
Innholders' Hall	College Street	City of London	07-Jan-1952			
Merchant Taylors' Hall	Threadneedle Street	City of London	01-May-1952			
Painter Stainers' Hall	Little Trinity Lane	City of London	01-May-1952			
Skinners' Hall	Dowgate Hill	City of London	07-Jan-1952			
Tallow Chandlers' Hall	Dowgate Hill	City of London	07-Jan-1952			
Vintners' Hall	Vintners Place, Upper Thames Street	City of London	06-Sep-1952			
Watermen's Hall	St Mary at Hill	City of London	07-Jan-1952			
Roman wall in basement of 90 Gracechurch Street	Nicholson and Griffin hairdressers, Gracechurch Street	City of London	?	Located behind a screen in a basement hairdressers.		
London Wall: remains of Roman wall, bastions and city gate of Aldgate from 17 Bevis Marks to India Street	Bevis Marks, Aldgate, Jewry Street	City of London	21-Dec-1976	Three non-contiguous sections located below street level. One section is visible basemen, however this is not generally open to the public.		
London Wall: remains of Roman wall and bastion, Goring Street	Goring Street	City of London	?	Remains below ground.		
Barnard's Inn Hall (Mercers' School)	Holborn	City of London	19-Feb-1951			
The Monument	Monument Street	City of London	19-Feb-1951			
Inner Temple Hall Buttery	Elm Court	City of London	19-Feb-1951			
London Wall: section bounding All Hallows Churchyard	All Hallows-on-the-Wall, London Wall	City of London	?			
London Wall: section in Amen Court	Amen Court	City of London	?			
London Wall: remains of Roman wall and bastion (4a) at Crutched Friars	Crutched Friars	City of London	29-May-1952	Located in basement of overlaying building - not accessible to the public.		
London Wall: site of Newgate and 121-124 Newgate Street, remains of Roman and medieval wall, gateway and bastion	Newgate Street	City of London	?	Two non-contiguous sections - one below ground, the other located in the reception at BOA Merrill Lynch.		
Roman hypocaust and building on site of Coal Exchange	St Mary Court, Lower Thames Street	City of London	07-Jan-1952			
London Wall: remains of Roman wall and bastion, Camomile Street	Camomile Street	City of London	?	Remains below street level.		
Stationers' Hall	Stationers' Hall Court	City of London	07-Jan-1952			
Roman amphitheatre	Guildhall Yard	City of London	23-Jul-1990			
London Wall: remains of Roman and medieval wall from W end of All Hallows Church to 38 Camomile Street	London Wall, Wormwood Street, Camomile Street	City of London	?	Remains below street level.		
London Wall: remains of Roman wall and conduit and medieval postern, Bloomfield House to site of Moor Gate	London Wall	City of London	?	Remains below ground. Marked by plaque and information board.		
Remains of Roman and medieval wall and gateway W of boundary of Stationers' Hall to Ludgate Hill	Amen Court, Ludgate Hill	City of London	?	Remains below street level. Marked by plaque.		
London Wall: remains of Roman fort wall and east gate under Aldermanbury	Aldermanbury	City of London	?	Two non-contiguous sections. No above-ground remains.		
Apothecaries' Hall	Blackfriars Lane	City of London	07-Jan-1952			
Armourers' and Brasiers' Hall	Coleman Street	City of London	07-Jan-1952			
Dyers' Hall	Dowgate Hill	City of London	07-Jan-1952			
Fishmongers' Hall	London Bridge	City of London	07-Jan-1952			
London Wall: section of Roman wall and Roman, medieval and post-medieval gateway at Aldersgate	Aldersgate Street	City of London	27-Apr-1976	No above ground remains.		
London Wall: section of Roman wall and medieval bastion in Postman's Park and King Edward Street	King Edward Street	City of London	09-May-1974			
London Wall: section of Roman wall at the Central Criminal Court, Old Bailey	Old Bailey	City of London	09-May-1974	Inside basement at the Old Bailey - not generally accessible to the public.		
London Wall: section of Roman wall within the London Wall underground car park, 25m north of Austral House and 55m north west of Coleman Street	London Wall	City of London	24-Aug-1974	Located in a below-ground car park.		
London Wall: section of Roman and medieval wall at St Alphage Garden, incorporating remains of St Alphage's Church	St Alphage Garden	City of London	19-Feb-1951			
London Wall: site of the Roman and medieval gateway of Cripple Gate	Wood Street	City of London	26-Oct-1973	No above ground remains. Site marked by plaque and information board.		
London Wall: section of Roman and medieval wall and bastions, west and north of Monkwell Square	Monkwell Square	City of London	20-Mar-1951			
London Wall: the west gate of Cripplegate fort and a section of Roman wall in London Wall underground car park, adjacent to Noble Street	London Wall	City of London	24-Aug-1961	No above ground remains.		
London Wall: section of Roman and medieval wall and bastion at Noble Street	Noble Street	City of London	28-Nov-2006			
London Wall: section of Roman wall and bastion beneath Crosswall, No. 1 America Square and Fenchurch Street railway station	Crosswall/America Square	City of London	07-Mar-2016	Located in a basement in an adjacent building - not accessible to the public.		
Isleworth Pottery	Nazareth House, Richmond Road, Isleworth	Hounslow	09-Dec-2016			
