= London to Lewes Way =

Roman road in England

Coordinates: 51.14865°N 0.0822°E

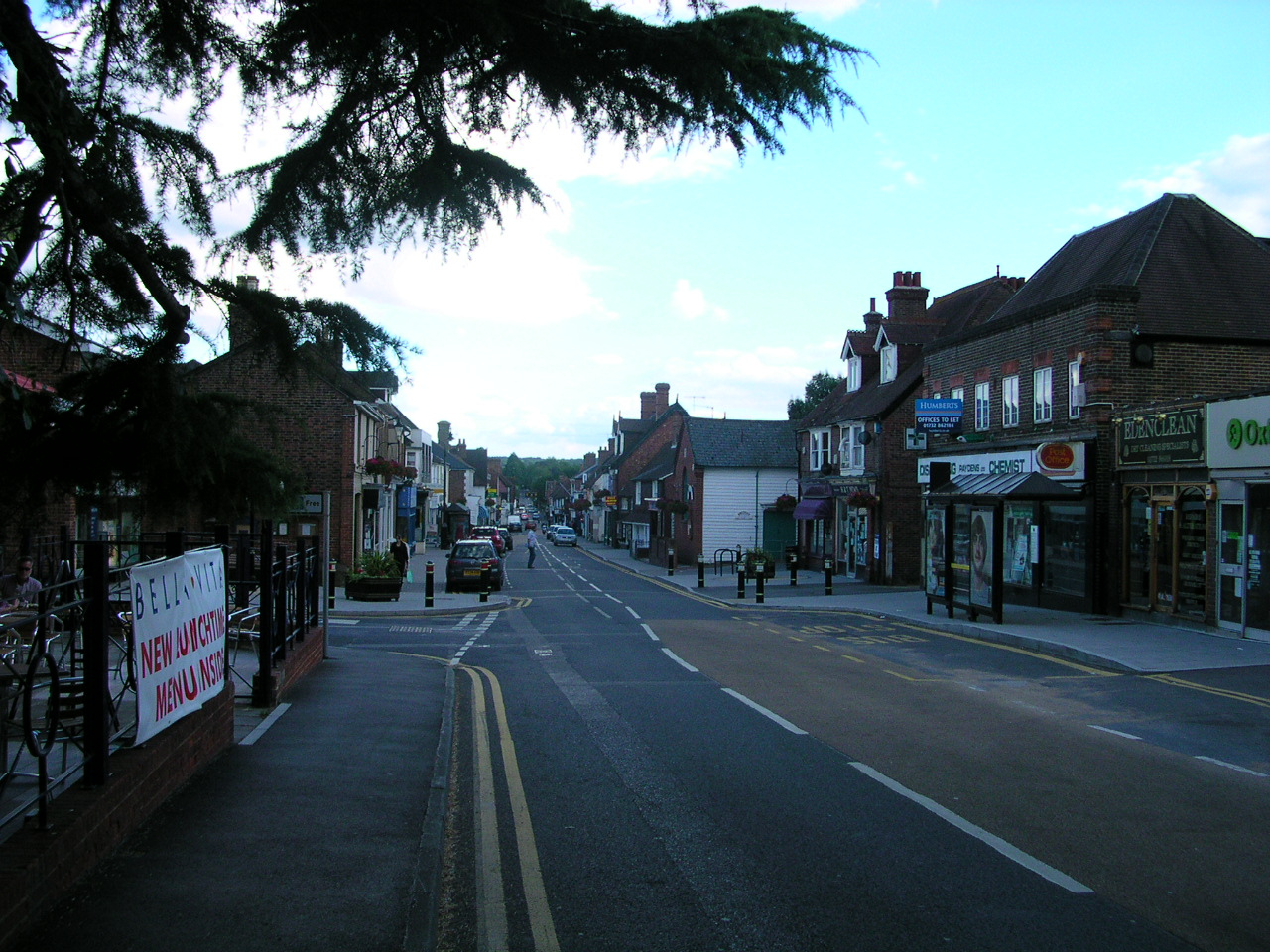
Edenbridge is built along the road

The London to Lewes Way is a 71 kilometres (44 mi) - long Roman road between Watling Street at Peckham and Lewes in Sussex. The road passes through Beckenham and West Wickham, then crosses the North Downs above Titsey, on the county boundary between Surrey and Kent, and is overlain by Edenbridge High Street. The road continues on this alignment onto the high ground of Ashdown Forest, where the more grassy vegetation on the silted up outer ditches contrasts very clearly with surrounding heather in aerial photographs, then descends through Piltdown to Lewes, linking with the Sussex Greensand Way at Barcombe Mills and with a network of roads at Lewes.

== Dating evidence ==
First and early second century pottery fragments were found over the edge of the road near Barcombe Mills, which, together with the heavy construction and planned alignments, indicate a late 1st or early 2nd century date.

== Design and construction ==
Five main alignments were used for the road, with local diversions from them to ease gradients and avoid wet ground. Flint and gravel were used over the North Downs and towards the South Downs, with slag from the Wealden iron industry used extensively for the middle sections, sometimes mixed with sandstone from Ashdown Forest and sometimes as a solid mass. At Holtye near East Grinstead a length of road excavated in 1939 revealed iron slag metalling showing cart ruts. Part of this has been left exposed and fenced off by the Sussex Archaeological Trust for viewing.

The width of the road varies greatly between places, from as narrow as 4.4 metres (14 ft) to as wide as 10.5 metres (34 ft) at Butcher's Cross, Hartfield. As no kerb was used the intended width is not known and spreading of material may have increased the eventual width. Where the road crosses hillsides on terraceways the width is about 3.8 metres (12 ft). Where outer ditches are visible on Ashdown Forest they are 19 metres (62 ft) apart.

Thickness of metalling also varies greatly, as does the size of agger. In some places a thick mass of iron slag was laid on the land surface, as at the excavated section at Holtye where the slag metalling was 30 centimetres (12 in) in the centre reducing to 7.5 centimetres (3.0 in) at the edges, laid directly on the clay subsoil and rusted into a concrete-like mass. Elsewhere an earth agger was protected by a much thinner stone layer, as on Ashdown Forest near Five Hundred Acre Wood where only about 7.5 centimetres (3.0 in) of compacted sandstone lumps were bedded on 5 centimetres (2.0 in) of yellow clay. The London end of the road was built of gravel or small flints over a layer of larger flints or pebbles, about 30 centimetres (12 in) thick at the centre, sometimes on a bed of sand.

== Route ==
=== Peckham to Blythe Hill Fields ===
This northernmost alignment branched from Watling Street close to the Old Kent Road in what is now the back garden of Number 77, Asylum Road, in Peckham, running parallel to the road for some distance under other back gardens. Here the road was built of gravel on a base of pebbles. Passing just east of Nunhead railway station the road runs along Ivydale Road, crosses the Crystal Palace Railway, and crosses Brockley Rise at St. Hilda's Church heading to Blythe Hill Fields.

=== Blythe Hill Fields to Titsey ===
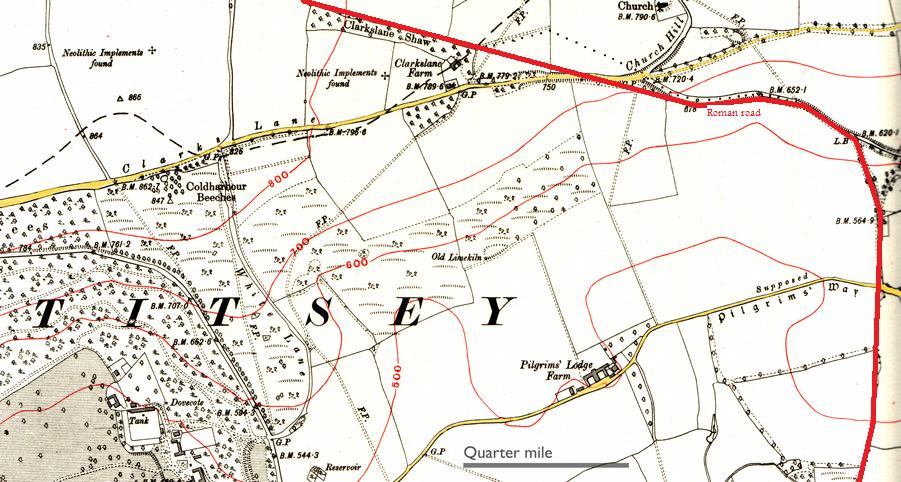
The line of the road on the North Downs scarp slope

On Blythe Hill the road turns 9 degrees to the south, and crosses the River Pool, then turns another 6 degrees southward onto the next main alignment. Here the intact road was found to be made of gravel on pebbles and flints under a golf course. It then crosses the railway about 210 metres (230 yd) east of Beckenham railway station. Going through Beckenham it passes close to Langley House then east of West Wickham village centre, crosses Corkscrew Hill, and goes down to the Addington to Hayes road, where there was once a small settlement. From Rowdown Woods the Surrey/Kent county boundary follows the road, making a V-shaped kink at Skid Hill where the road deviates from the alignment to cross a steep valley. This alignment, marked by tracks and hedgerows, continues to the top of the North Downs above Titsey where it is more than 260 metres (850 ft) above sea level. Here the road makes a sharp turn eastwards to follow the ridge of the downs, passing south of Tatsfield church before beginning its descent of the escarpment on a terraceway, originally 3.8 metres (12 ft) wide, passing west of the rectory, to cross the Pilgrims Way. The road is followed by the Titsey-Tatfield parish boundary for 4 kilometres (2.5 mi).

=== Titsey to Marlpit Hill ===
600 metres (660 yd) south of the Pilgrims Way, at the foot of the escarpment, the road passed a Roman temple where it turned onto the major alignment that goes to Marlpit Hill north of Edenbridge. This alignment was parallel to that north of the downs, but half a mile further east. The M25 motorway cuts across the road south of the temple site, at the end of the eastern slip roads of Clacket Lane services. Some Roman artifacts found during construction of the service areas are on display there. In the woods east of Limpsfield Chart the road deviates from the alignment to avoid steep slopes, curving to the east on a route followed by the modern road through Crockham Hill before rejoining the alignment north of Marlpit Hill.

=== Marlpit Hill to Ashdown Forest ===
At Marlpit Hill the road makes a small direction change of only three degrees, and almost entirely keeps to this line to the high ground of Ashdown Forest. The straight run of Edenbridge High Street, crossing the River Eden and continuing to Dencross, where it continues as a private drive, is the most impressive surviving section of the road. Beyond this the road has been lost, seen only in hedgelines and traces of iron slag metalling in fields. In Peters Wood at Holtye an agger with iron slag metalling can be seen and on a footpath south of the A264 road a length of almost 100 metres of intact road was excavated in 1939, revealing a slag metalled surface in excellent condition and showing wheel marks. Part of this area south of the road has been kept uncovered by the Sussex Archaeological Trust. The agger is clearly visible south of this point and again at Butcherfield Lane, Hartfield, where 40 centimetres (16 in) of slag metalling was found on a large wide agger. The road then climbs a small steep hill in an engineered cutting. At Chuck Hatch the road enters Ashdown Forest, zig-zagging to cross a gill at Loneoak Hall, then maintaining its straight line onto the high forest. It then turns 46 degrees west and uses a number of straight alignments to follow the ridge to Camp Hill. This forest section was metalled with sandstone, and was more clearly visible before being damaged by tank training exercises during World War II. Distinct side ditches near Camp Hill are 19 metres (62 ft) apart.

=== Camp Hill to Lewes ===
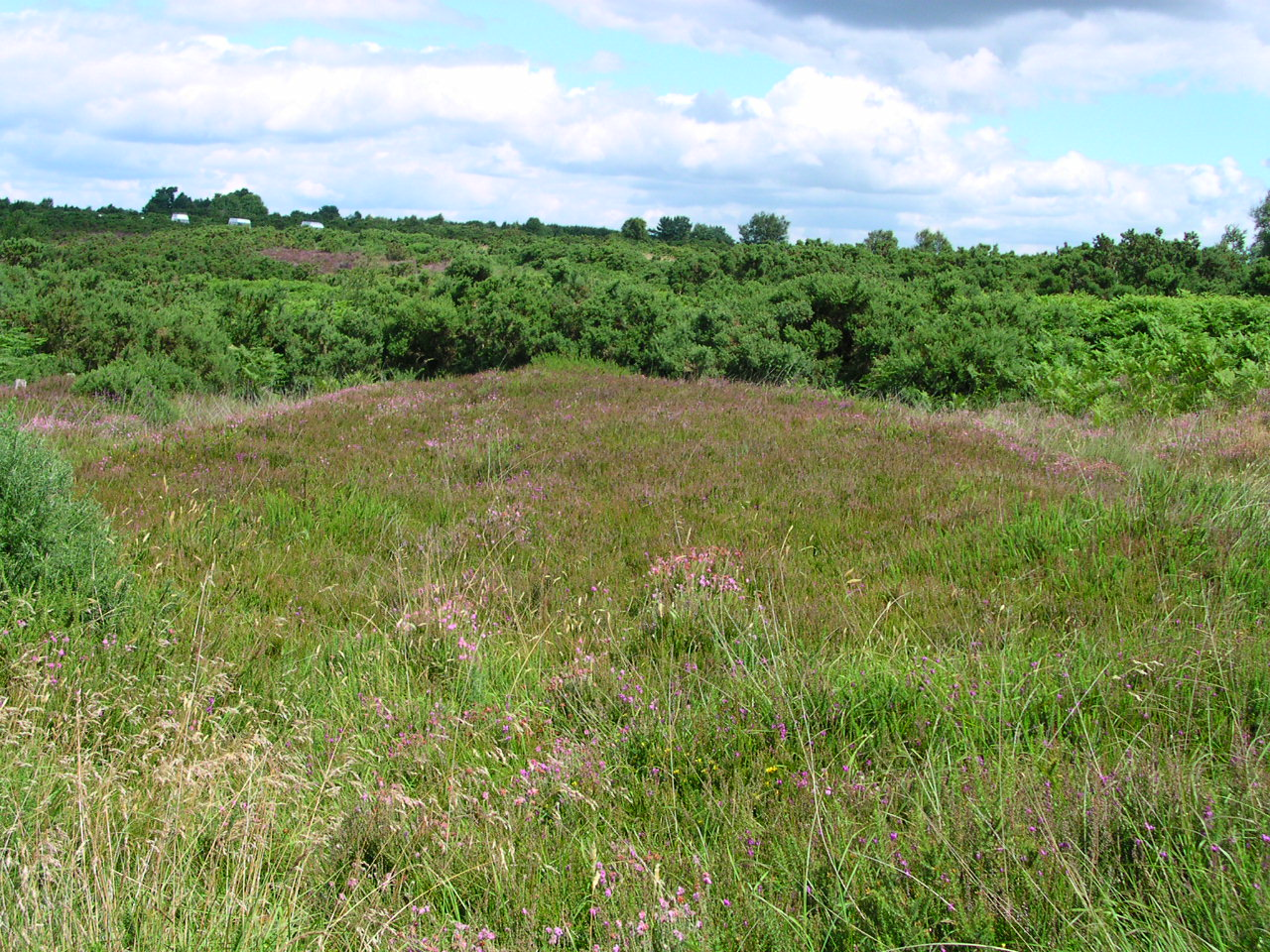
The agger marked out on Ashdown Forest at Roman road car park

The southernmost 18 kilometres (11 mi) alignment to Lewes was sighted between Camp Hill and Malling Hill on the east side of Lewes. The road passes east of Streater's Farm, which is likely to have taken its name from the road, and runs east of the modern road to Duddleswell until crossing it 220 metres (240 yd) north of Fairwarp church. A slag metalled agger exists at Old Workhouse Farm where the road leaves the open forest. Before reaching the roundabout on the A22 road there is a 4.5 metres (15 ft) wide terrace cut into a sandstone outcrop. After passing west of Maresfield the road can be traced through Park Wood and Fairhazel Wood at Piltdown as an agger with slag metalling. A visible agger in the park at Buckham Hill House was found by Ivan Margary to have perfectly intact metalling of slag, gravel and brown flints, 4.5 metres (15 ft) wide and 38 centimetres (15 in) thick in the centre. The road passes to the west of Isfield's remote church, through a triangular water meadow, before crossing the River Ouse beside a Norman castle motte, suggesting that there was still a river crossing to guard at the Norman Conquest. Near Gallops Farm the road runs along the eastern side of Alder Coppice and traces of slag can be found in the fields all the way to Barcombe Mills and the junction with the Sussex Greensand Way. The road recrossed the Ouse at the mill site and was found intact in a field to the south, 6 metres (20 ft) wide, solidly constructed from flint and a little slag. Some pottery fragments found at the road edge suggest a date of 100 A.D. or earlier. Beyond this some 700 metres (770 yd) of road have been eroded away by the river, then the course of the road can be traced by slag in the fields west of Wellingham House. The modern A26 road runs on the line from Pay Gate Cottages, past Upper Stoneham Farm, then turns southwest to skirt round Malling Down while the Roman road continues along the east side of the allotments and over the shoulder of the down to Cliffe.

== See also ==
- Roman Britain
- Roman roads in Britain

== Bibliography ==
- Livingston, Helen (1995). In the Footsteps of Caesar: Walking Roman Roads in Britain. Shepperton: Dial House. ISBN 0711022534.
- Maggs, Ken; De'Athe, Paul (1987). The Roman Roads of East Surrey and the Kent Border. Westerham: North Downs Press.
- Margary, Ivan D. (1968). Roman Ways in the Weald. Phoenix House. ISBN 0-460-07742-2.
- Margary, Ivan D. (1973). Roman Roads in Britain (3rd ed.). London: J. Baker. ISBN 0212970011.
- Vincent, Alex (2000). Roman Roads of Sussex. Middleton Press. ISBN 1-901706-48-6.
