= Northala Fields =

Park in Northolt, Ealing, London

Coordinates: 51°32′24.32″N 0°22′25.65″W

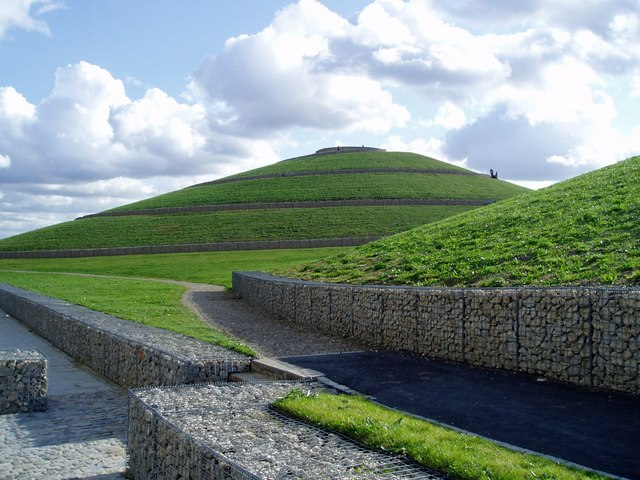
Looking towards the highest of the four hills in Northala Fields

Northala Fields is a park located in Northolt, in the London Borough of Ealing. It was opened in 2008 and consists of four artificial hills standing next to the A40 Western Avenue, as well as several fishing lakes, a large field area, a children's play area and adjacent café. The hills were constructed using rubble from the demolition of the original Wembley Stadium, which was closed in 2000 and demolished in 2003. The park was created as part of the Northolt and Greenford Country Park project, and backs onto the older Rectory Park.

The name "Northala" is how the old manor of Northall (Northolt) was recorded in Domesday Book in 1086.

It is situated on what were previously the Royal Borough of Kensington Playing Fields after being leased to them in 1938.^{[a]} The section of the Ealing Road that formed the eastern perimeter was then renamed Kensington Road. The nearest station is Northolt which is 1.14 km away from the park.

The hills were featured in an episode of the British TV show Taskmaster, series 2 episode 1. Contestants had to place three exercise balls on a yoga mat which was on top of one of the hills.

== Gallery ==
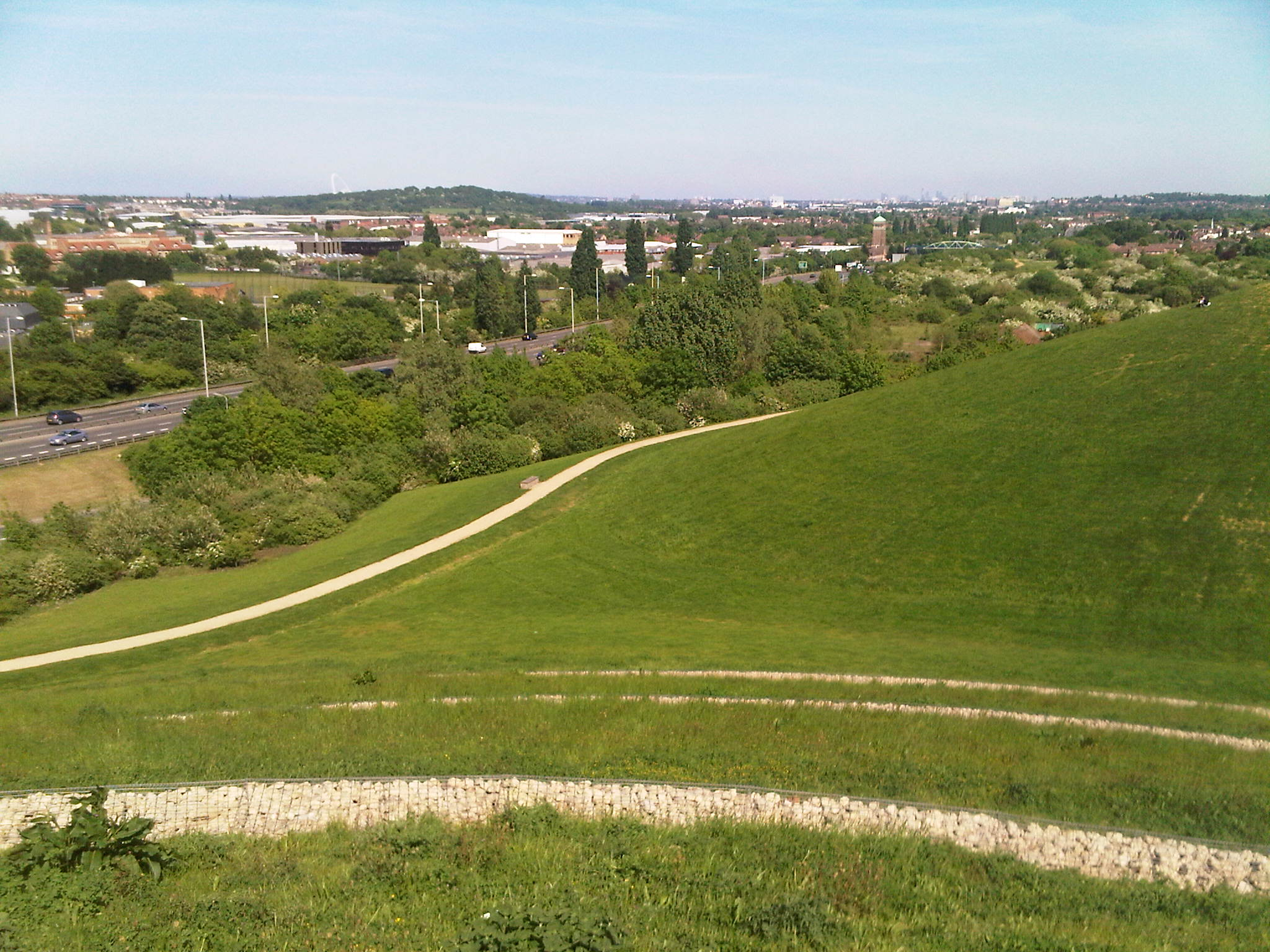
View from the highest hill in Northala Fields (towards Wembley)

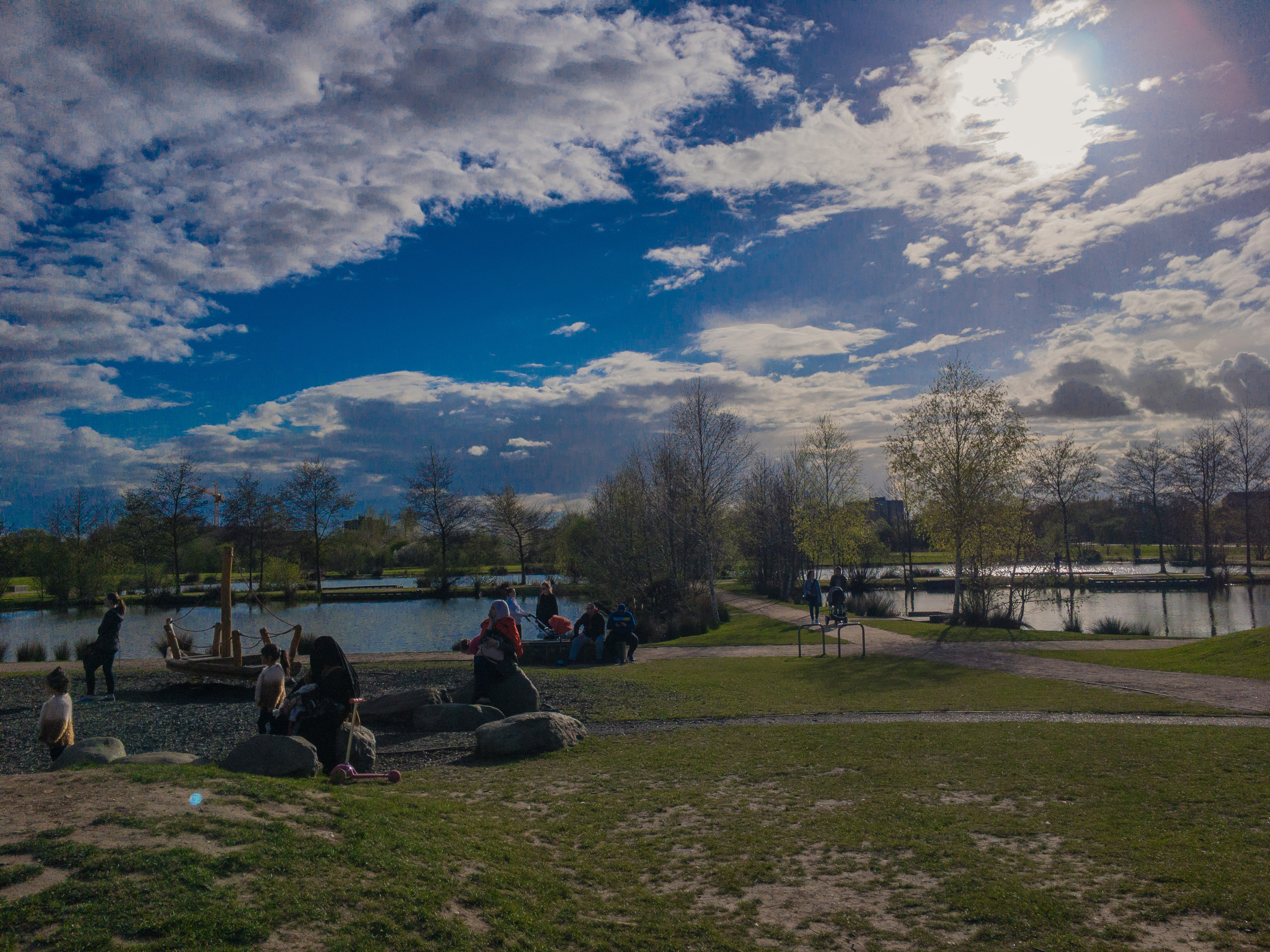
Ponds in the Northala Fields

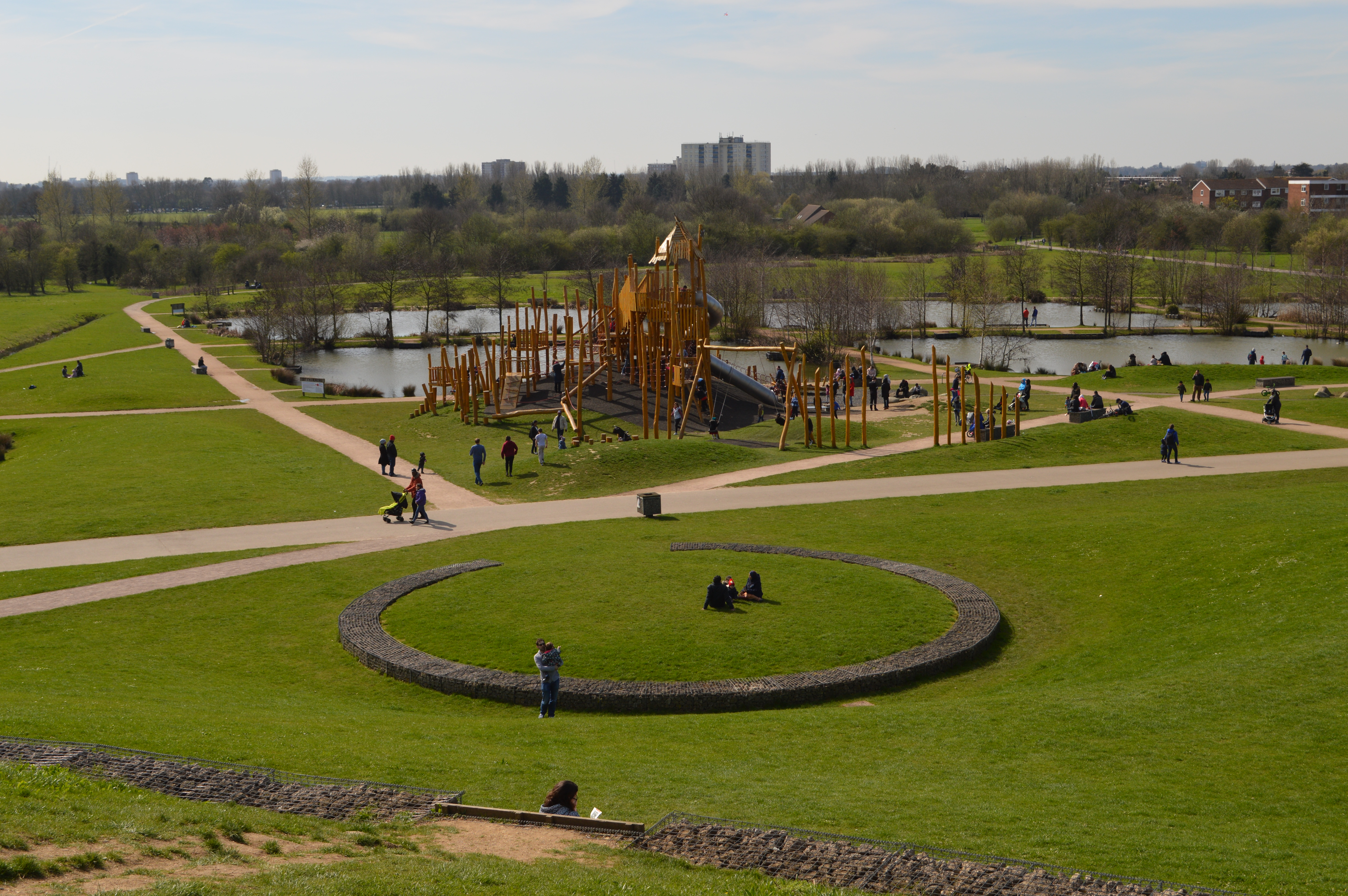
The playing area of the Northala Fields

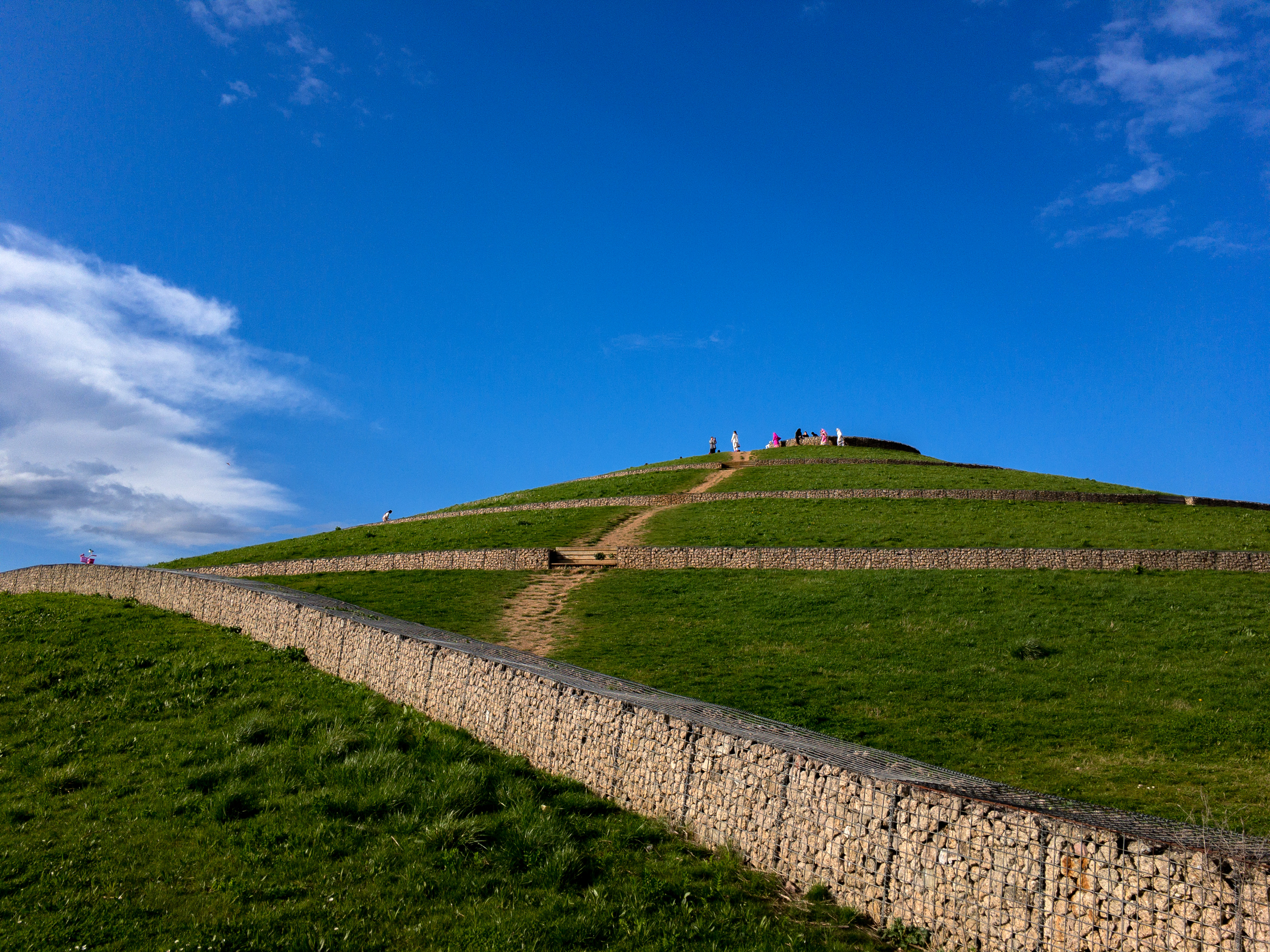
One of the hills

== Notes ==
a. At that time, Kensington and Chelsea were separate boroughs. The name of the playing fields did not change when Kensington and Chelsea were amalgamated.
