= Three Bridges, London =

Rail, canal and road crossing in England

Three Bridges
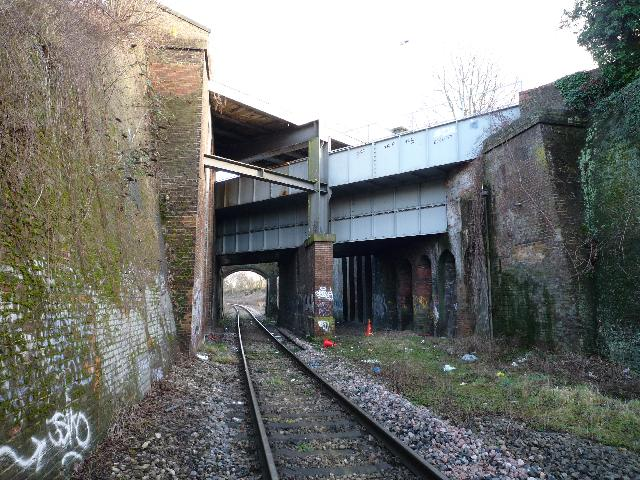
- View of the Three Bridges

- Location within London Borough of Ealing
- 51°30′16″N 0°21′20″W
- Type: Bridge
- Location: Southall
- OS grid reference: TQ 14246 79655

History
- Built: 1859; 167 years ago

Site notes
- Area: London Borough of Ealing
- Architect: Isambard Kingdom Brunel

Scheduled monument
- Official name: Windmill Bridge
- Designated: 26 January 1970; 56 years ago
- Reference no.: 1002020

Three Bridges, known formally as Windmill Bridge, is a three-level crossing of transportation routes in Southall, Greater London, England. Despite its name, the landmark features only two bridges—a road bridge over a canal, which is carried in an aqueduct over a railway, which is in a cutting. A road bridge spanned the canal since the early 18th century but the structure was replaced when the railway was built in 1856. The road bridge is a cast-iron arch and the aqueduct is a cast-iron trough, all supported by brick piers, abutments, and retaining walls. The crossing was designed by Isambard Kingdom Brunel, the last major project before his death. The site is a scheduled monument.

== History ==
The crossing was built for the Great Western and Brentford Railway (GWBR, a subsidiary of the Great Western Railway, GWR), whose line ran from GWR's main line at Southall (nine miles—14.5 kilometres—west of Paddington station) to Brentford Dock on the River Thames. The railway was constructed in a cutting under the Grand Junction Canal (which terminates at Brentford Dock) at the same point that the canal is crossed by Windmill Lane. The site was chosen to avoid Osterley Park, which was protected in the acts of parliament authorising both the canal and the railway, and St Bernard's Hospital. The structure was designed by Isambard Kingdom Brunel, his last major engineering work before his death. The contractors were E. R. Murray and J. L. Tredwell. The name "Windmill Bridge" comes from a windmill which formerly occupied the site and which featured in a painting by J. M. W. Turner.

Although Brunel was the chief engineer of the GWBR, he was occupied at the same time with several other projects, including the launch of the SS Great Eastern and the design of the Royal Albert Bridge, and it is likely that his subordinates were at least partly responsible for the engineering works on the line.

The road crossing of the canal dates from the canal's construction at the turn of the 19th century. Permission for the six-mile (10 kilometre) branch line was granted by an act of parliament in 1855 and construction began early the following year. The line opened for freight trains on 18 July 1859 and began carrying passengers in 1856. Initially, only a single broad gauge track was laid. This was supplemented by a mixed-gauge track in 1861 and in 1875 both tracks were reduced to the narrower standard gauge.

== Description ==
The road bridge is a cast-iron arch which replaced the original structure. Cast into the side plates are the name and address of the foundry: "Mattw T Shaw, 64 Cannon Street, City". Below the road bridge, at a right angle, the canal is carried over the railway in a cast-iron trough; the canal's towpath is cantilevered from the sides. The railway is in a cutting beneath both, which was built wide enough to carry a double-track broad gauge line. Various structural supports are in brick, including the retaining walls which support the cutting, the piers supporting the aqueduct, and wing walls, along with two strainer arches to support the retaining walls and relieve the load of the canal. The aqueduct is in two spans, totalling 59 feet (18 metres), and crosses the railway at an angle of about 35 degrees. It is 7 feet (2.1 metres) deep and 18 feet (5.5 metres) wide; it has 10 feet (3.0 metres) of headroom below the road bridge. The base of the central support pier for the aqueduct is in the middle of the cutting, between the track beds.

The railway line is now single-track and little-used. The bridge deck of the road span was later replaced with concrete. Despite later repairs, the structure's appearance is largely unchanged in the 21st century.

The site is a scheduled monument, first designated in 1970, a status that affords it legal protection. The scheduling document calls it "a considerable feat of engineering" and "an extremely impressive example of a combined bridge and aqueduct, which survives remarkably well". Windmill Bridge is a rare example of a cast-iron bridge by Brunel, of which there are estimated to be fewer than 10 survivors.

== See also ==
- Wharncliffe Viaduct on the Great Western Main Line nearby
- Scheduled monuments in Greater London
- List of canal aqueducts in Great Britain
