= Blythe Hill Fields =

Park in the London Borough of Lewisham, England

- Blythe Hill
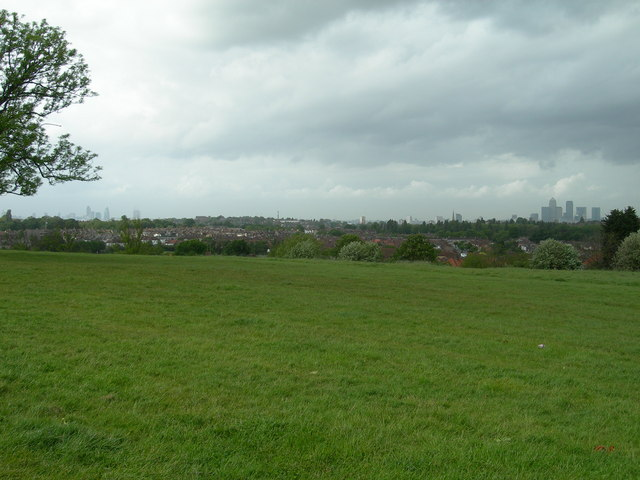
- Blythe Hill Fields provides panoramic views of Canary Wharf and the City
- Interactive map of Blythe Hill Fields
- Type: public park
- Location: Catford and Forest Hill, London, England
- Coordinates: 51°27′08″N 0°02′00″W
- Created: 1935
- Status: Open year round
- Website: lewisham.gov.uk

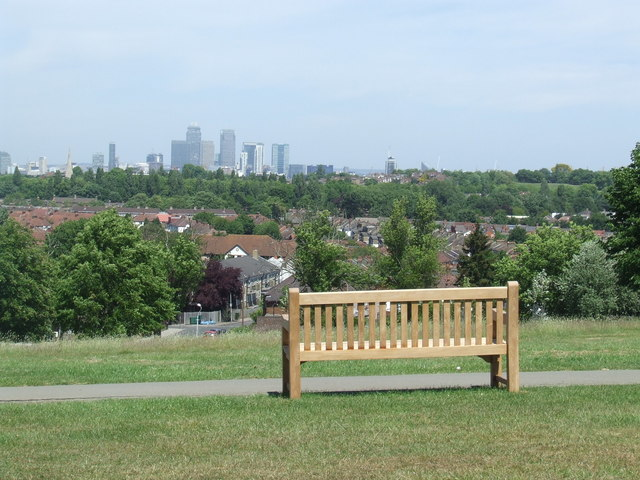
The open space escaped development, partly due to its elevation photo: Malc McDonald, geograph.org.uk

Blythe Hill Fields, also sometimes known as Blythe Hill is an area of elevated open land in the London Borough of Lewisham that commands panoramic views over Canary Wharf, the City, Kent and Surrey. The surrounding areas of Blythe Hill Fields involve Catford to the south and southeast, Crofton Park to the north, and Forest Hill to the west.

The land stands at an elevation of 70 metres (230 ft) – which may be one of the reasons it escaped development – and was once part of Brockley Farm. A brickworks was also formerly on part of the site and a chimney remained there until 1938. Blythe Hill House was built to the south in 1842 and its grounds covered a large part of Blythe Hill Fields until it was demolished in 1895. The land where Blythe Hill Fields now stands was bought by London County Council and opened as a public park in 1935.

== Access ==
The park can be accessed from a number of different points:

- Blythe Hill Lane
- Montacute Road
- Codrington Hill
- Brockley View.

The TFL bus routes that are in close proximity are the 171, 185, 122, 284, 172, P4 and P12.

== Archaeology ==
Blythe Hill was traversed by the Roman road to East Sussex, known today as the London to Lewes Way. It is classified as an area of archaeological priority.

== Blythe Hill Fields friends ==
The Friends of Blythe Hill Fields, formerly the Blythe Hill Fields User group, is an active group that exists to represent everyone living around or using Blythe Hill Fields. Their purpose is to achieve sustainable improvements and facilities for the benefit of the community. Since 2007, the Friends have organised an annual festival featuring local food traders, musicians, dance troupes and craftspeople.

The children's playground is situated near to the Blythe Hill Lane entrance. It was refurbished following a grant. This has seen the introduction of educational planting and natural materials in the first upgrade of facilities for many years, most recently the planting of a tiny forest.

== In music ==
Blythe Hill Fields is the title of a track by singer songwriter Ceri James, of the Welsh group The Mountaineers.
