= Romano-British site, Wickham Court Farm =

Archaeological site in Bromley, London

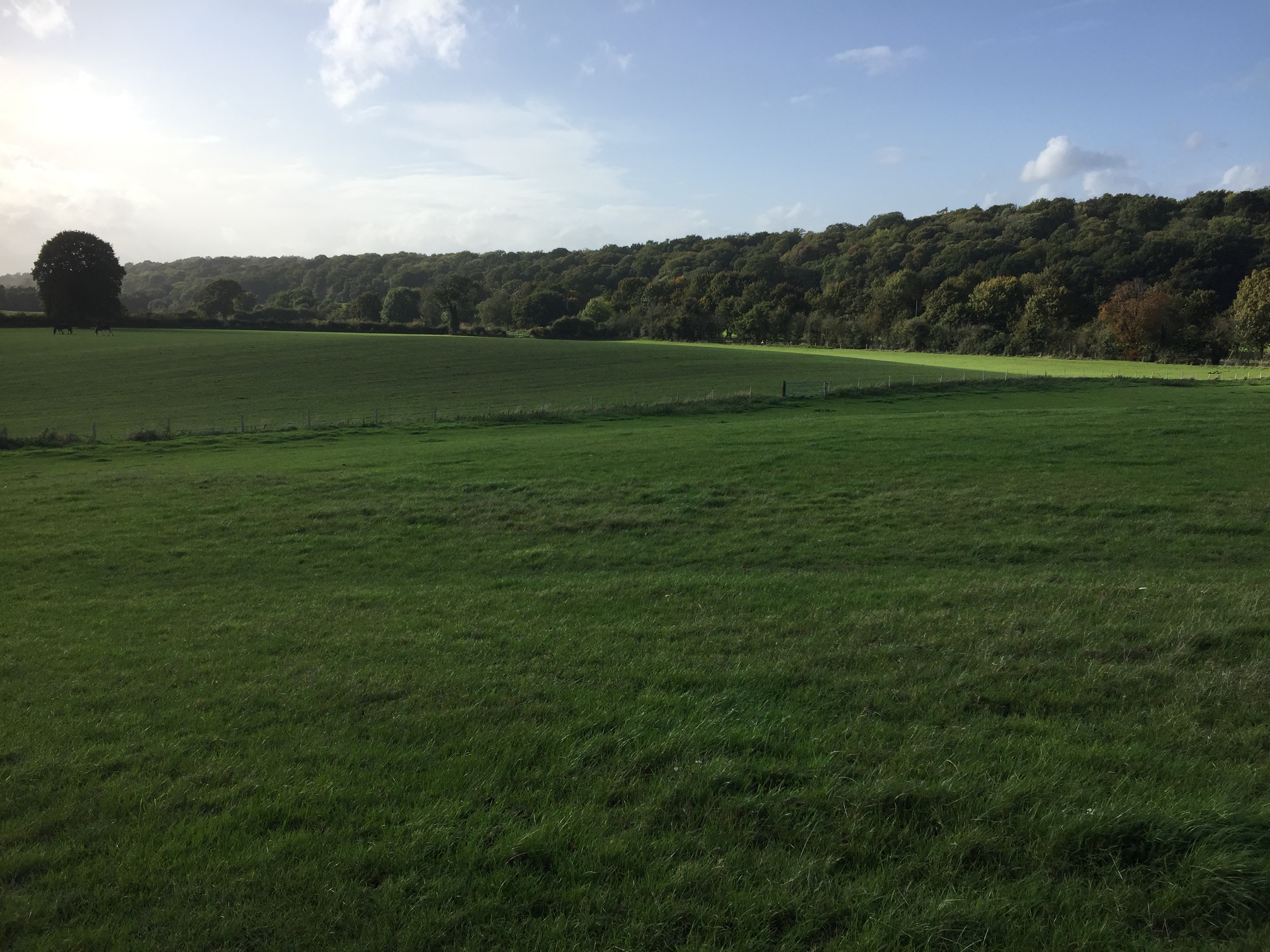
- Location: West Wickham/Coney Hall, Kent
- Coordinates: 51°21′57″N 0°00′31″W
- Built: Roman Britain

Scheduled monument
- Official name: Romano-British site, Wickham Court Farm

The Romano-British site, Wickham Court Farm is a Roman-era archaeological site in the London Borough of Bromley, situated south-east of West Wickham and south-west of Coney Hall. It is a scheduled monument.

== The site ==
The site forms a roughly square shape and lies in a field on Addington Road, adjacent to St John The Baptist Church. It lies on what was the London to Lewes Way in Roman times. Archaeological digs were conducted on the site in 1962-66, 1976 and 1981, revealing pottery, coins and the remains of what may have been a blacksmiths workshop. It was Scheduled on 25 July 1978.

In 2009 a group of five men were cautioned by police after illegally using metal detectors on the site.

== Gallery ==
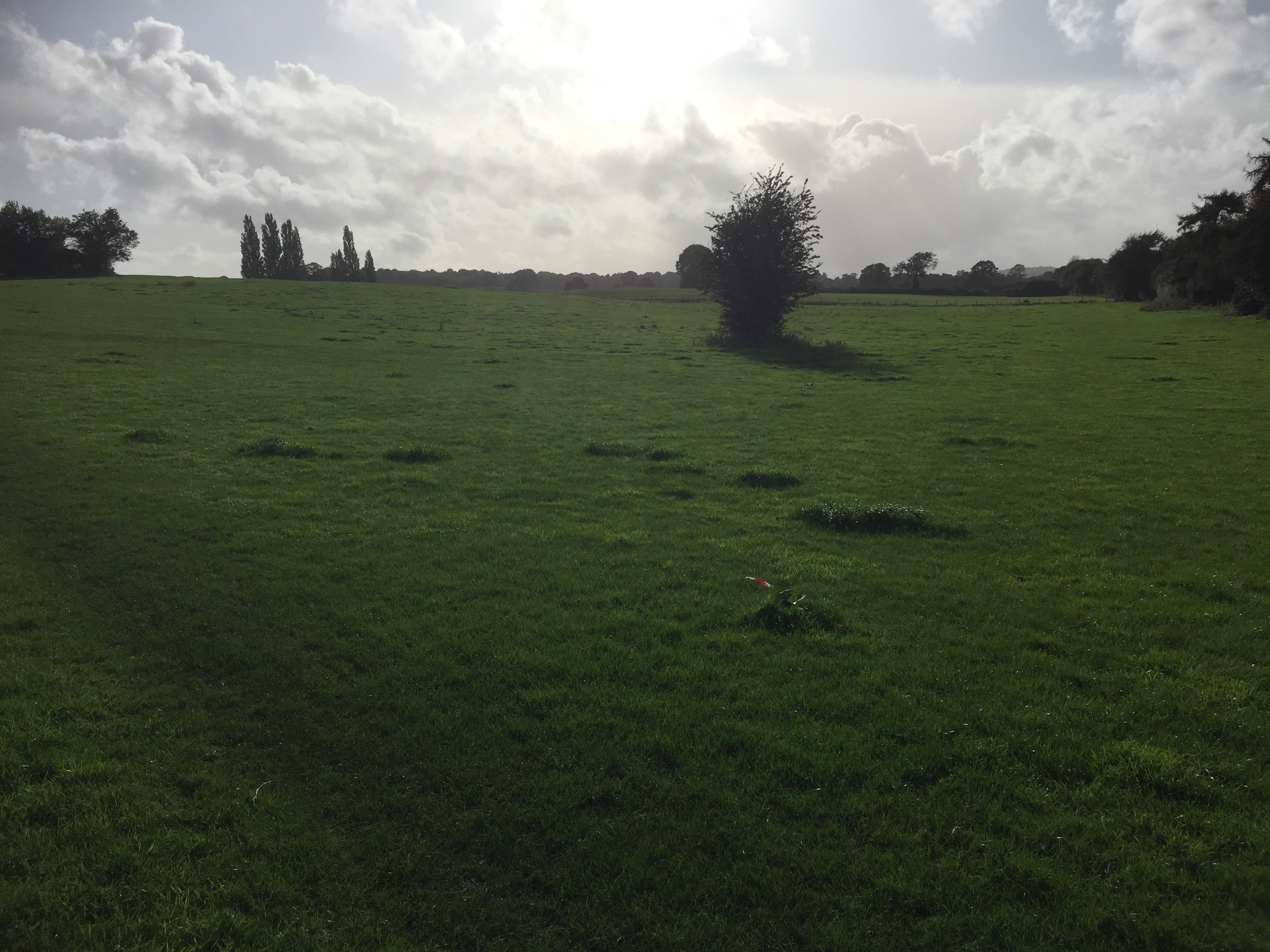

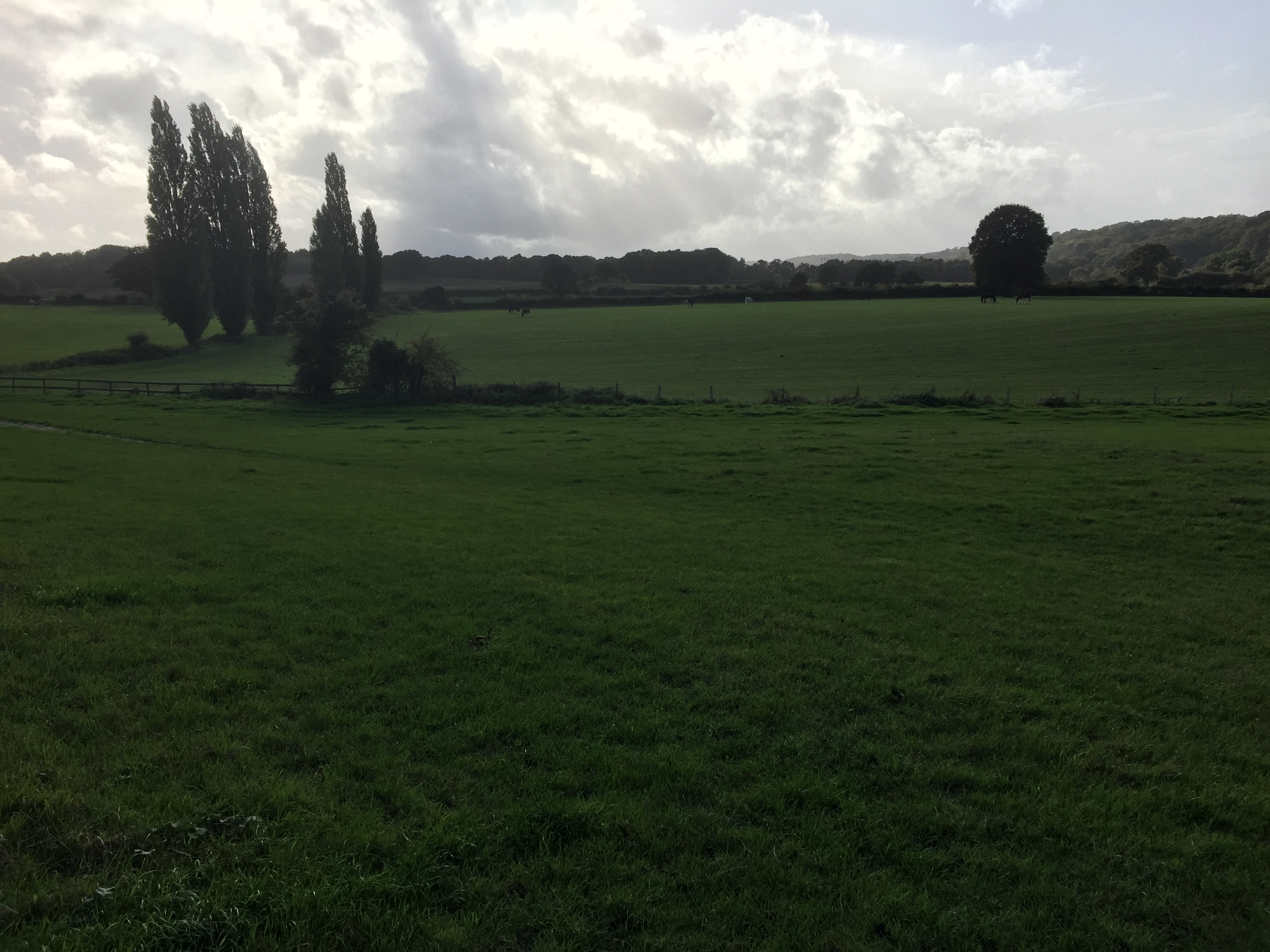

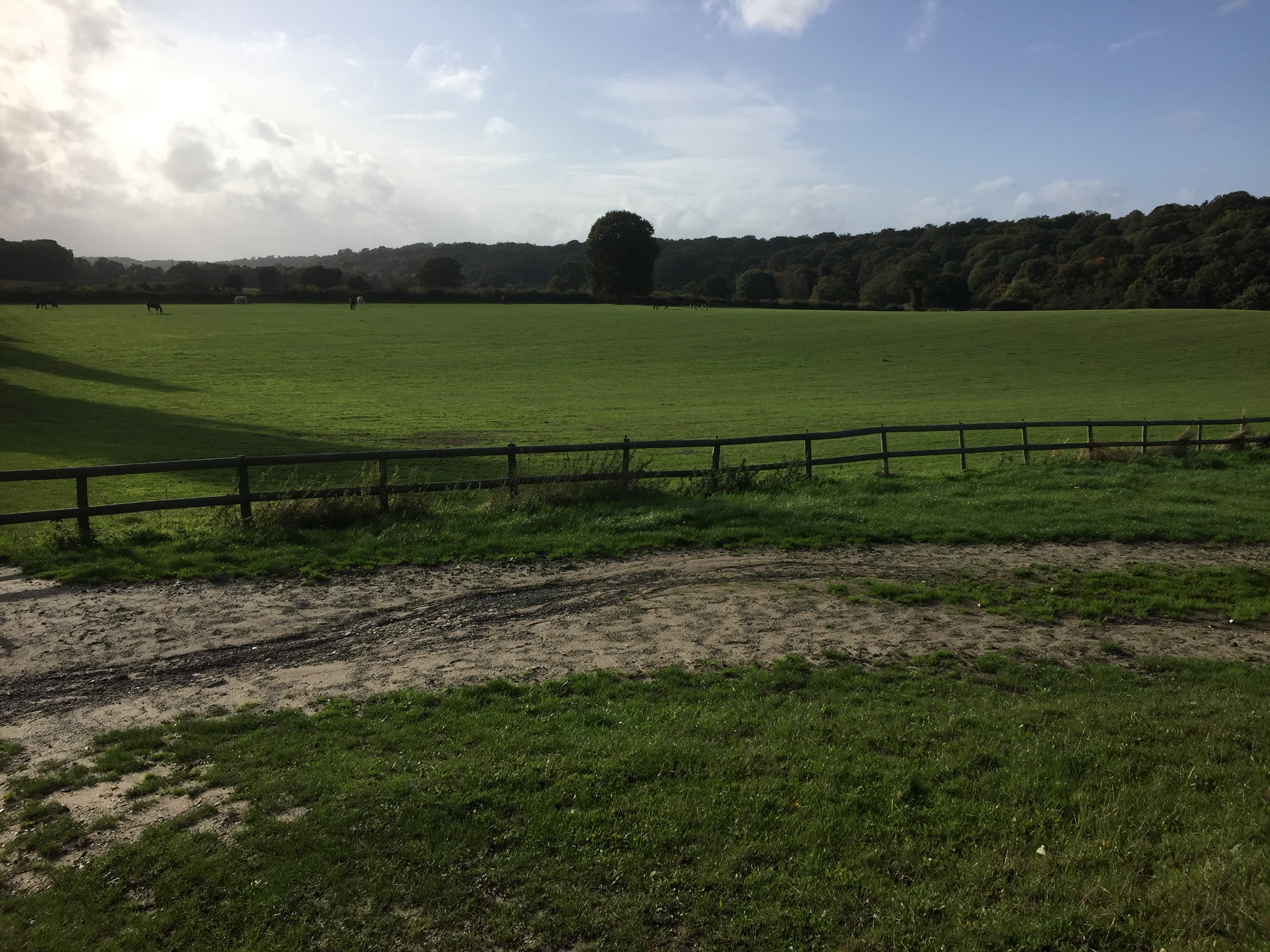
