= Down Barns Moated Site =

Coordinates: 51.541901°N 0.40119934°W

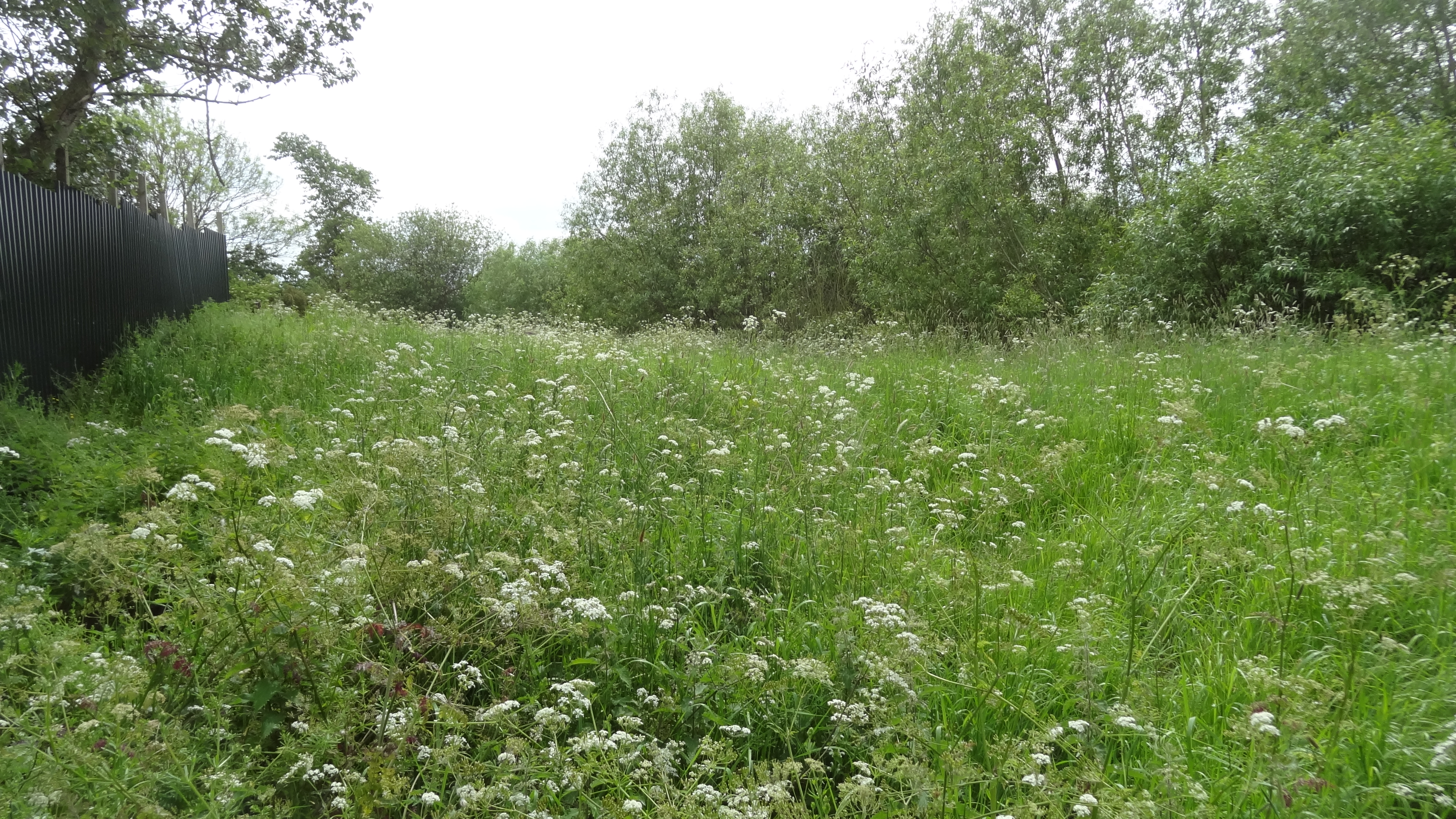

Down Barns Moated Site is a Scheduled Ancient Monument in Northolt in the London Borough of Ealing. It is the site of a medieval manor house, which does not survive, but the moat does. It was probably in existence by 1388, and is thought to have been abandoned in the sixteenth century. Excavations were undertaken in the 1950s and 1960s, but the results are not known. Pottery previously excavated here was originally identified as Saxon, but now thought to be prehistoric.
