= Northolt Manor =

Manor house in the London Borough of Ealing, England

Coordinates: 51.5444°N 0.3690°W

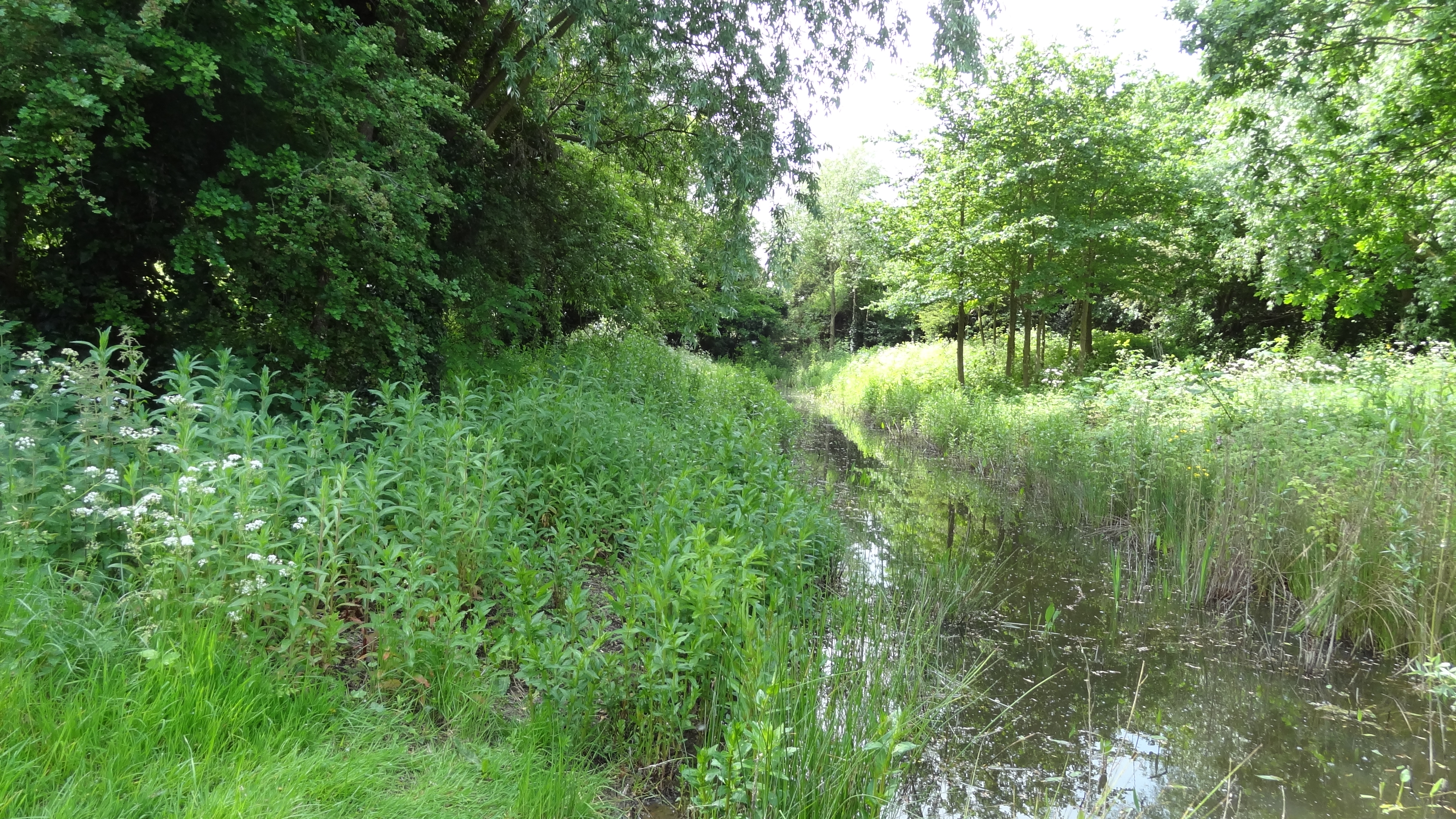
Northolt Manor moat

Northolt Manor is a 1.8 hectare scheduled monument, local nature reserve and Site of Borough Importance for Nature Conservation, Grade II, in Northolt in the London Borough of Ealing. It is owned and managed by Ealing Council.

Archaeological excavations from 1950 show that the site has been occupied since at least the 7th to early 8th centuries. Around 1300 a moat was dug, and later in the century the first stone buildings were erected to make a moated manor house. It was demolished in the eighteenth century. In 1935 the land was purchased by the local authority for public open space.

The site has meadows, scrub, woodlands, wetlands and ponds. There is access from Court Farm Road.
