= Northolt =

Area of London

Coordinates: 51°32′48″N 00°22′12″W

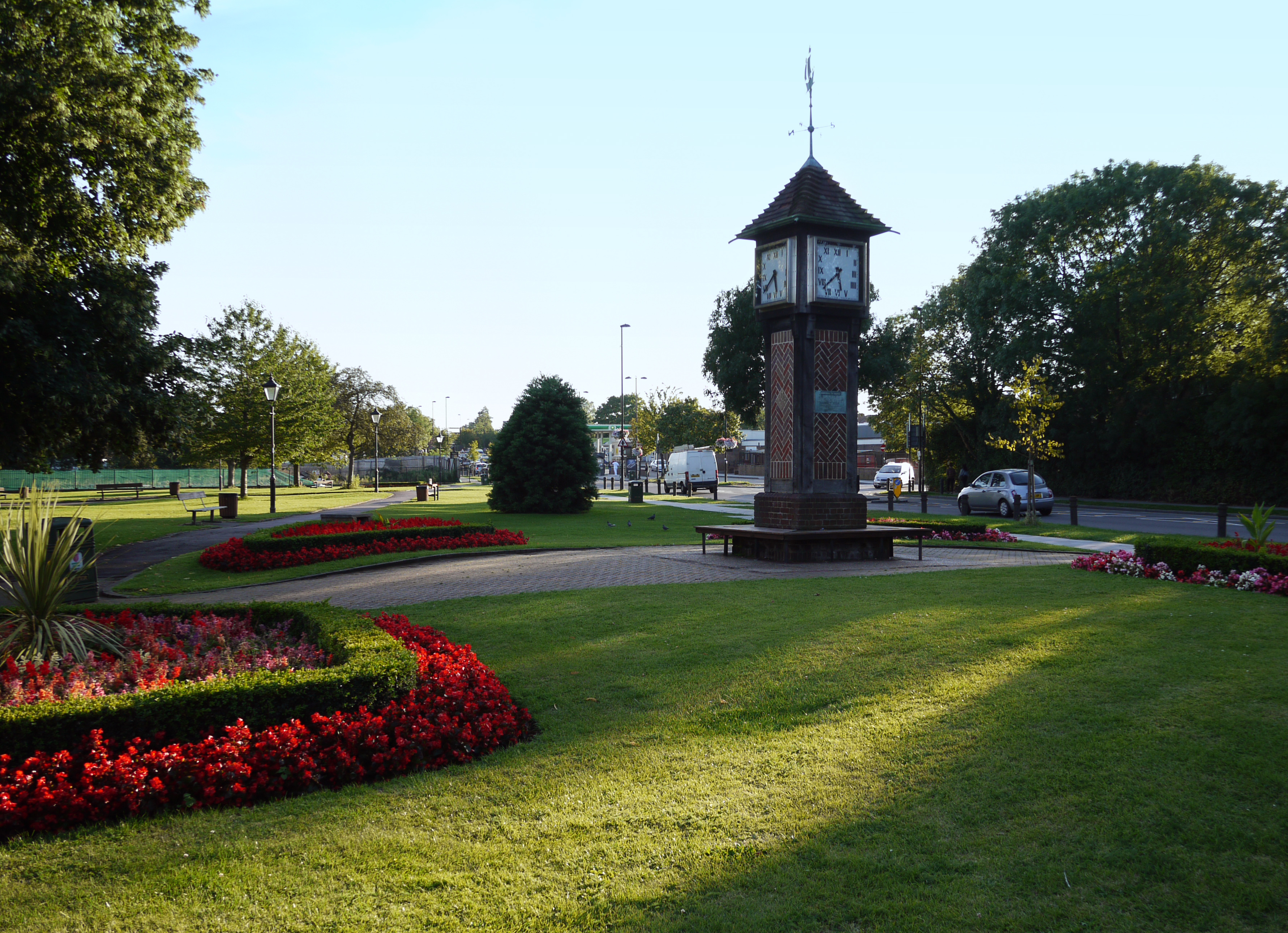
- Northolt Green and the clock tower

- Location within Greater London
- Population: 30,304 (2011 Census)
- OS grid reference: TQ135845
  - Charing Cross: 11 mi (18 km) ESE
- London borough: Ealing
- Ceremonial county: Greater London
- Region: London
- Country: England
- Sovereign state: United Kingdom
- Post town: NORTHOLT
- Postcode district: UB5
- Dialling code: 020
- Police: Metropolitan
- Fire: London
- Ambulance: London
- UK Parliament: Ealing North
- London Assembly: Ealing and Hillingdon

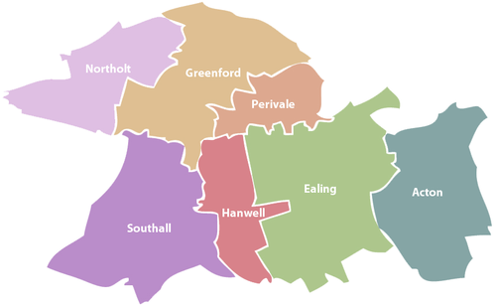
Map of the London Borough of Ealing, showing the location of Northolt, one of Ealing's seven major towns

Northolt is a town in West London, England, spread across both sides of the A40 trunk road. It is 11 mi (17.7 km) west-northwest of Charing Cross and is one of the seven major towns that make up the London Borough of Ealing. It had a population of 30,304 at the 2011 UK census.

== History ==
The earliest record of Northolt is in 872 as the Anglo Saxon norð healum, where norð is North and healum (or hale) is a nook, corner, or retreat,. By 1610, the Name Northolt appears, with in this case, holt having no relationship with 'wood', but an evolution of hala, hale, hal, hall, halle and holt.

Archaeological evidence suggests that the settlement's origin was an 8th-century Saxon village close to Northolt Manor behind the present Court Farm Road. It is mentioned in the Domesday Book as Northala, part of the Elthorne Hundred in the historic county of Middlesex, England. In 1066 the lord was Esger the constable, and in 1086 was Geoffrey de Mandeville. Northolt Manor itself was built in the fourteenth century and provides much of the archeological information of the area from its excavations in the 1950s and onward. A Tudor barn built in 1595 from Smith's farm in Northolt was moved to Chiltern Open Air Museum and is now on display there. In the early part of the 18th century farmland was enclosed in order to provide hay for the City of London, alongside more traditional crops such as peas and beans. Up to late Victorian times, the area was rural with predominantly arable crops being grown.

1795 saw parliamentary approval for construction of Paddington Arm of the Grand Junction Canal later becoming part of the Grand Union Canal. The route from Hayes to Paddington passes through Northolt, opening on 10 July 1801. The Great Central Railway line (now the Chiltern Line) opened in 1906, passing through Northolt on its way from Marylebone to High Wycombe. However, it wasn't until 1926 that a station opened at Northolt Park. 1906 also saw the Great Western Railway's New North Main Line pass through south of Great Central Railway on its way to Birmingham. The following year Northolt Halt opened on it, eventually becoming Northolt station. In 1948 an extension to the Central line, transformed it into Northolt tube station.

In May 1915 the Royal Flighing Corp established an airfield in neighbouring South Ruislip in the London Borough of Hillingdon, Most early RAF airfields were named after the nearest railway station; in this case Northolt Junction, (now South Ruislip), so it became RAF Northolt.

WW1 also brought an urgent need for more munitions, and in 1915 the Ministry of Munitions created many national munition factories. The National Filling Factory No 7 in Hayes, Middlesex had an explosives magazine at Northolt which was completed late in 1916. This 93-acre site had 20 stores, each able to hold 100 tons of explosives, and was connected by a rail spur at Northolt Junction station. The location was just north-east of the current Ruislip Gardens station, with the rail spur on the south side of Yeading Brook, and the magazines connected by trolleyways on the north side. About 100 tons of explosives per day were sent by rail to Hayes for filling artillery shells - both the Hayes factory and the magazine were removed after the war ended.

Suburban development began in the 1920s. Most of the housing north of the Western Avenue was built in the 1920s–1930s, and is in the private housing sector. Most of the housing built to the south of the Western Avenue was built in the 1960s–1970s, and is in the social housing sectors, particularly along the Kensington and Ruislip Roads.

Two important transport links run through Northolt: the Paddington Arm of the Grand Union Canal and the modern A40 road.

In the 21st century, a new large private housing development was built on the former site of the Taylor Woodrow company, adjacent to the Grand Union Canal. This development is known as "Grand Union Village" and incorporates a new canal boat marina.

== Landmarks ==
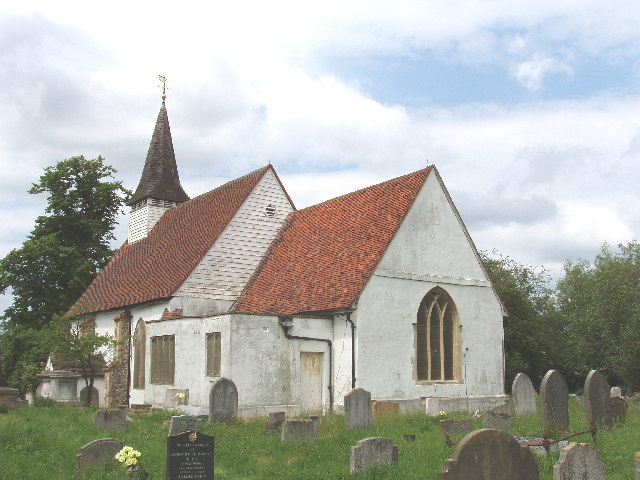
The 13th-century St Mary's Church

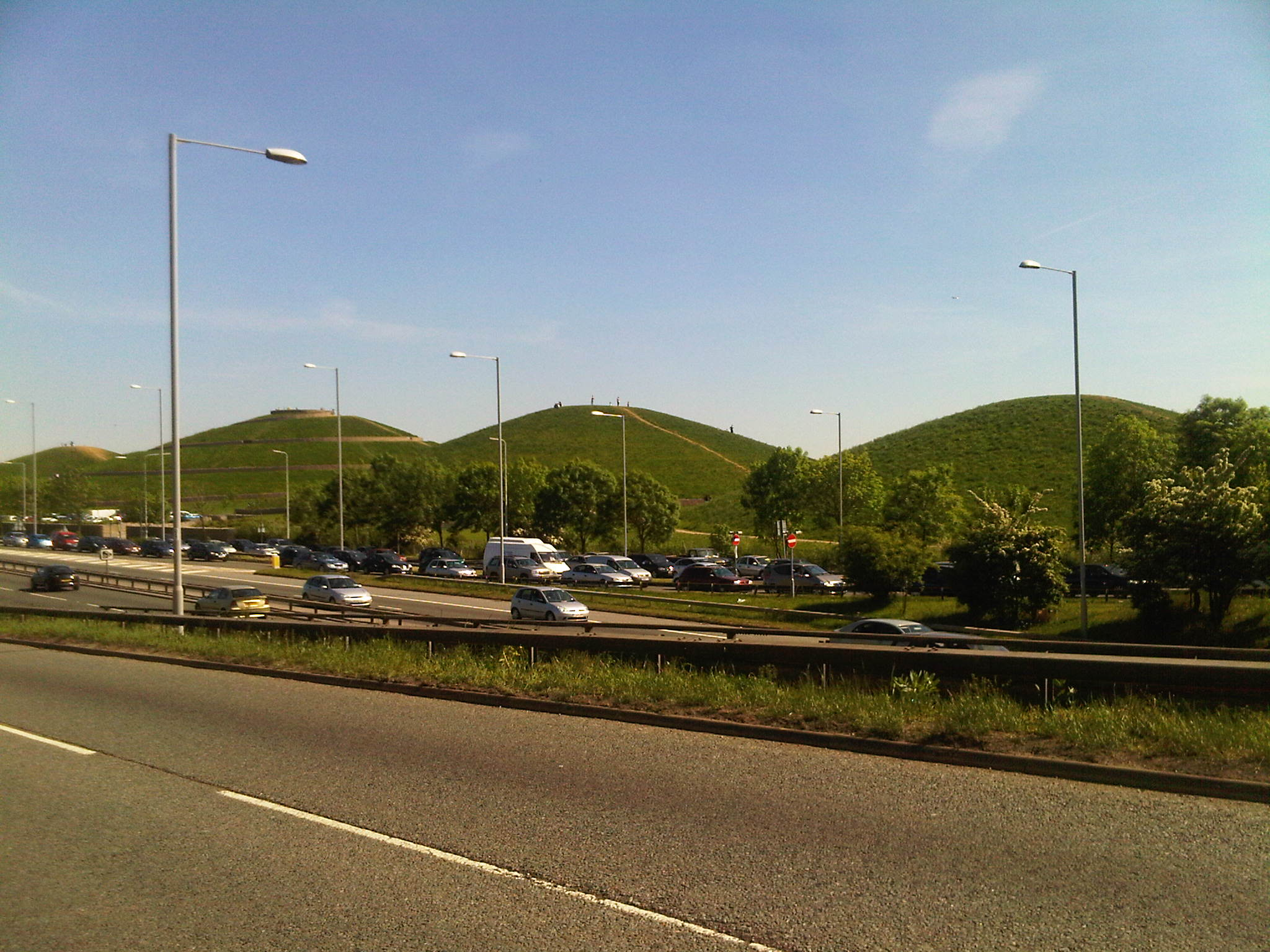
Northala Fields in Northolt (view from A40)

- St Mary the Virgin church (13th century) stands on the hill overlooking the old village. The Welsh poet Goronwy Owen was briefly a curate here. Bishop Samuel Lisle is buried here.
- In the centre of the village is a freestanding clock tower erected to commemorate the coronation of George VI in 1937.
- The White Hart public house is on the site of an old coaching inn. The roundabout immediately south of it is on the junction of the A312 (Church Road and Hayes Bypass) with the A4180 (Ruislip Road and West End Road). The Yeading Lane also joins the roundabout. (Now closed)
- Willow Cottages on the village green are said to have been built of bricks from the old manor house, which once stood behind the parish church.
- The two towers of the disused RAF radio station north of the town are situated in the Wood End wireless station recreation ground, which is bordered on all sides by housing (Bayshill Rise, Lancaster Road, Blenheim road). The location is now home to a National Air Traffic Control base.
- Northala Fields is a large area alongside the A40 road which has been redeveloped as an extension to the Northolt and Greenford Country Park. The development consists of four large, man-made conical hills (built of rubble from the first Wembley Stadium), which act as a sound barrier to block traffic noise from the Western Avenue. Behind the mounds are new ponds and a visitor centre.
- The Larkspur Rovers F.C. clubhouse is in Rowdell Road, Northolt. It received funding from Ealing Council and an Olympic legacy grant of £50,000 from Sport England's Inspired Facilities Fund.
- There is a village community centre building in Ealing Road, opposite St Mary's church, which incorporates an open-air miniature railway.
- A leisure centre, incorporating a pool, a fitness centre, a community hall and a library was built on the site of the former Swimarama swimming pool at the junction of Mandeville Road and Eastcote Lane North, and opened in 2010.
- Down Barns Moated Site, a Scheduled Ancient Monument.

=== Northolt Village ===
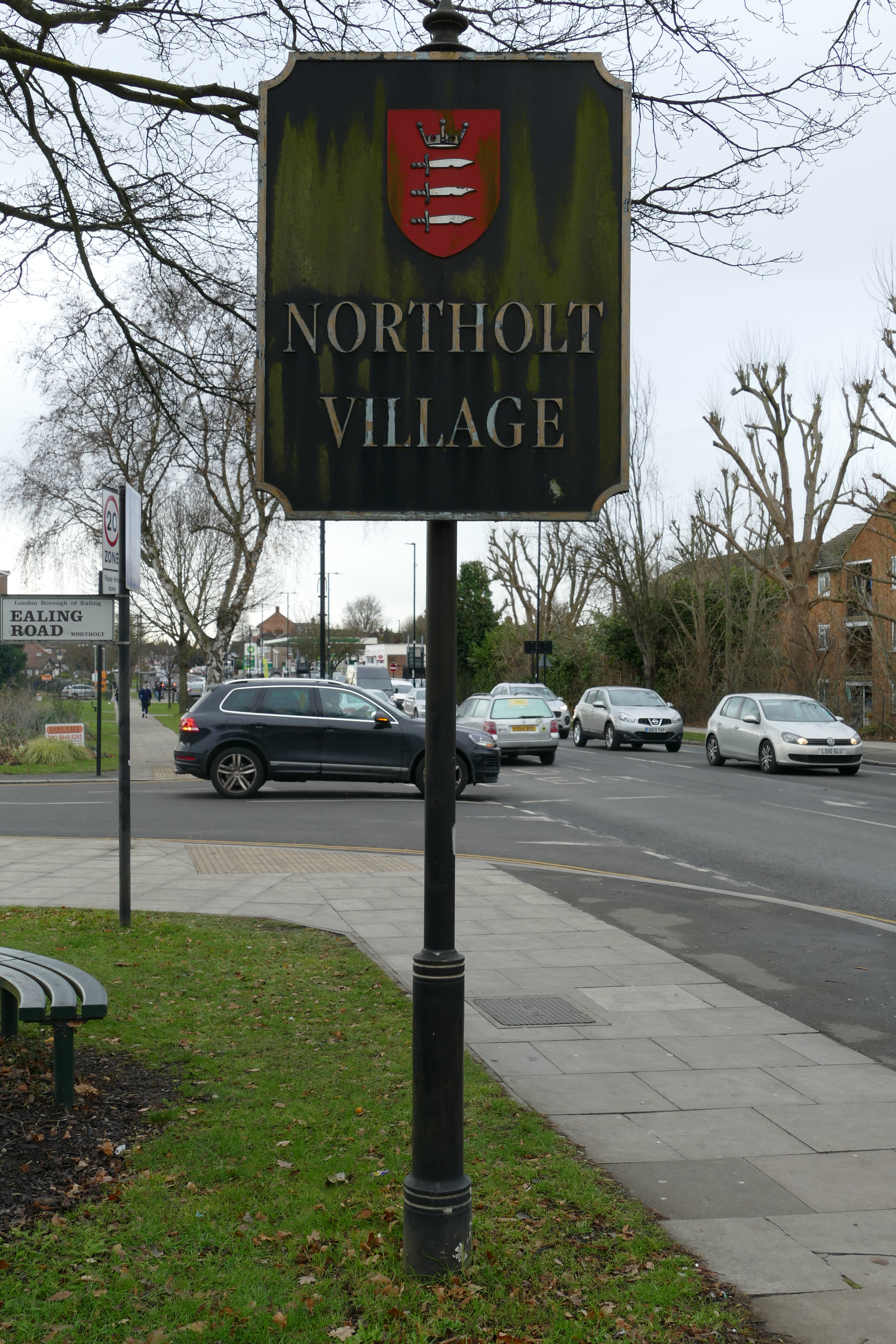
Village sign with Middlesex coat of arms

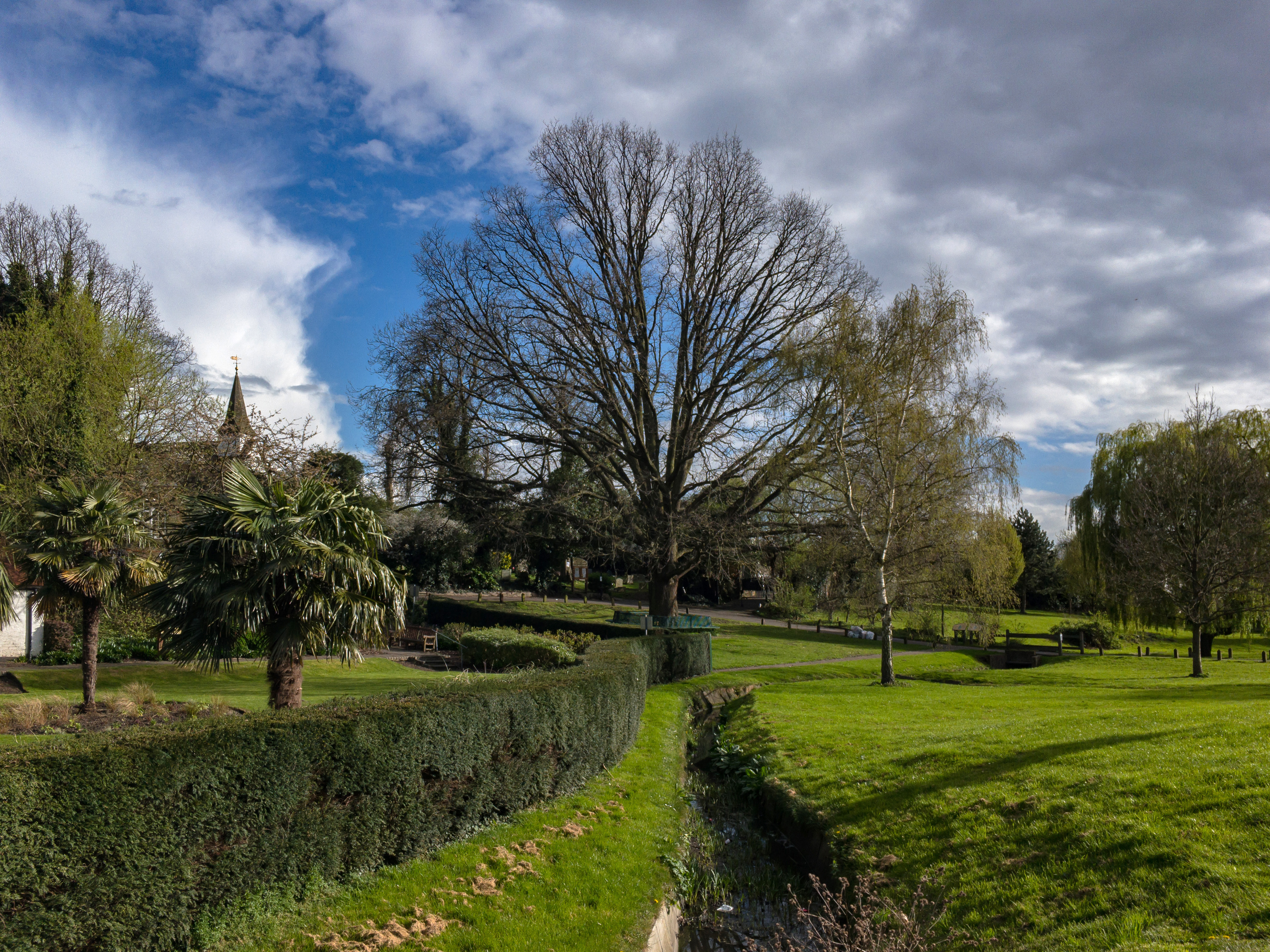
Belvue Park

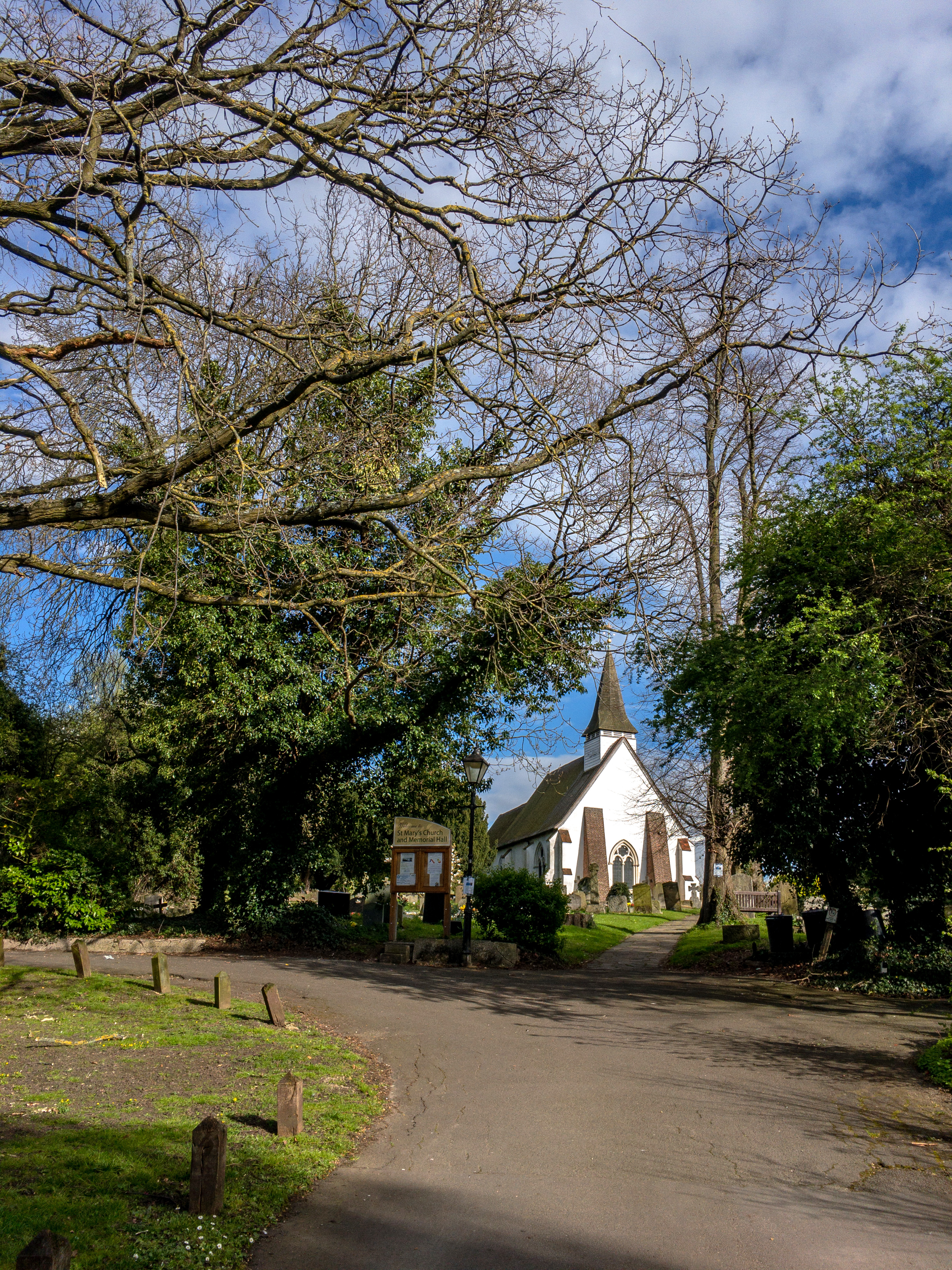
St Mary's Church

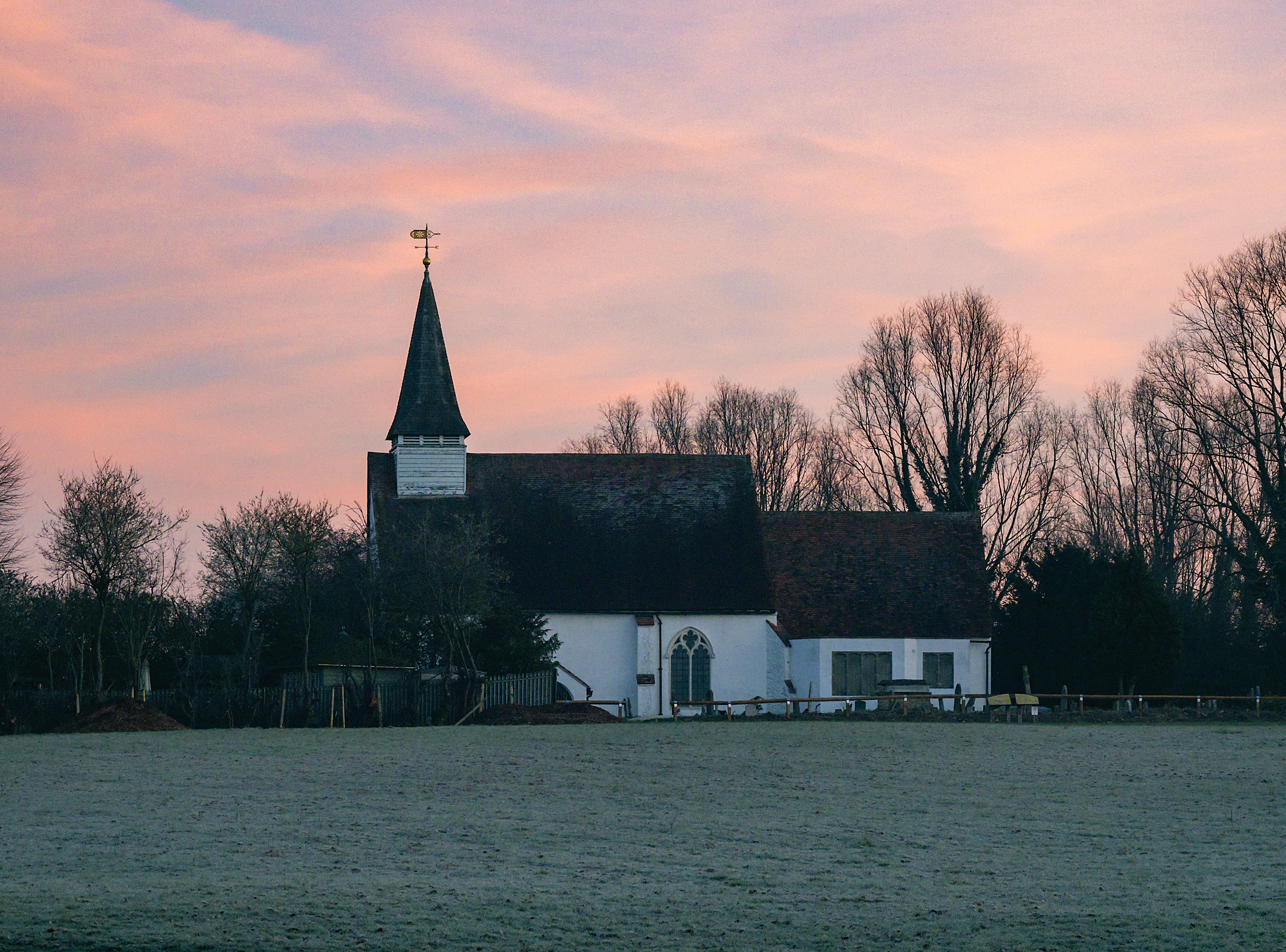
St Mary's Church

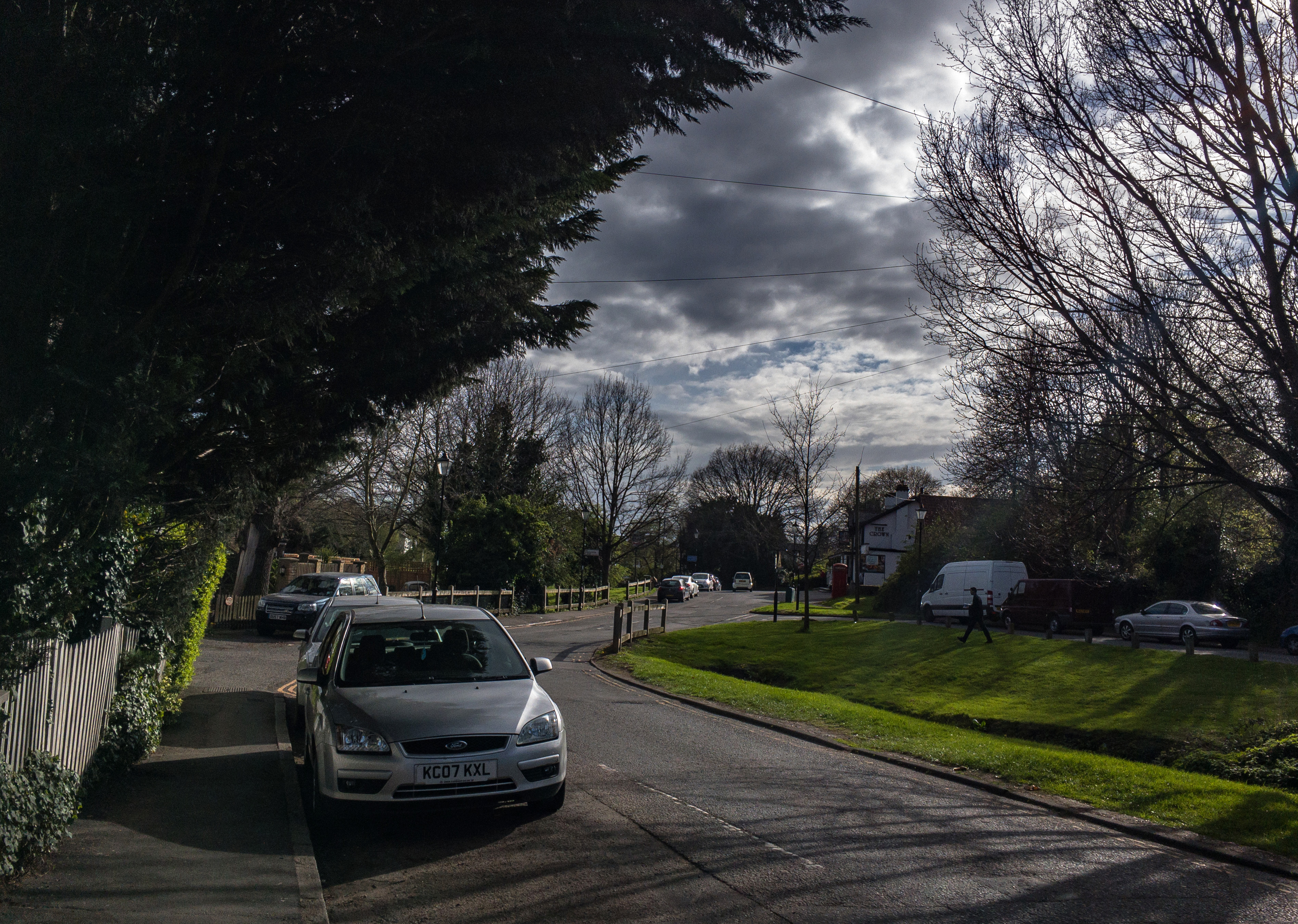

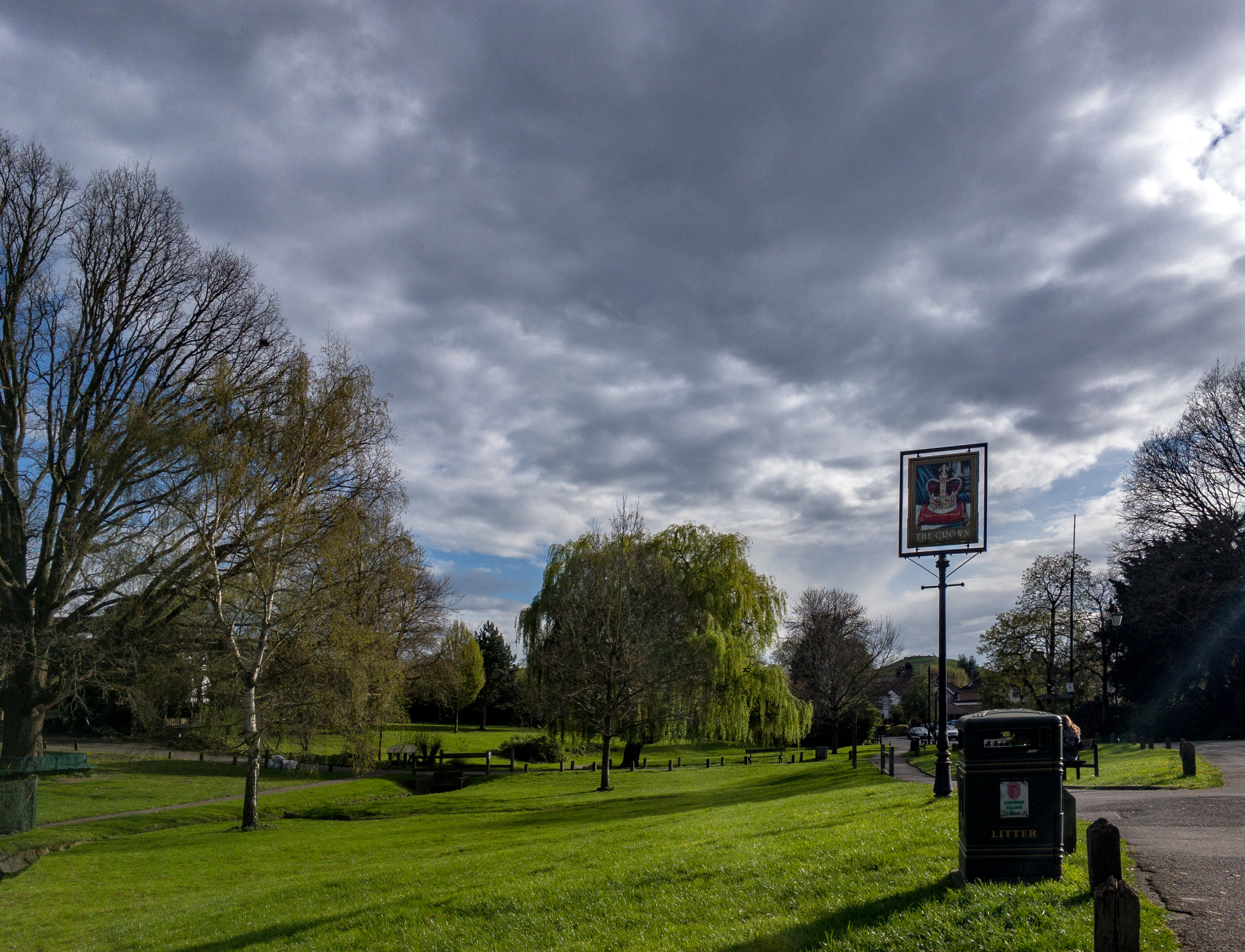
Signage of The Crown pub

== Geography ==
Northolt is in the north-western corner of Ealing, bordering the boroughs of Harrow and Hillingdon. The centre of Northolt lies at an elevation of about 130 ft (40 m) above sea level. It is hillier in the north (up to about 200 ft (60 m)) whereas the south is lower, about 115 ft (35 m). The town is mainly suburban, with some industrial land to the east (by the Grand Union Canal), large green parts such as Lime Tree Park and Rectory Park, and semi-rural land to the west

Northolt is located 3.3 mi (5.3 km) from Hayes; 2.4 mi (3.9 km) from Southall; 1.4 mi (2.3 km) from Greenford; 3.1 mi (5.0 km) from Wembley; 2.7 mi (4.3 km) from Harrow; 2.8 mi (4.5 km) from Ruislip; and 4.5 mi (7.2 km) from Uxbridge.

=== Climate ===
Climate data for Northolt (1991–2020)
Month	Jan	Feb	Mar	Apr	May	Jun	Jul	Aug	Sep	Oct	Nov	Dec	Year
Mean daily maximum °C (°F)	8.2 (46.8)	8.8 (47.8)	11.6 (52.9)	14.8 (58.6)	18.1 (64.6)	21.2 (70.2)	23.5 (74.3)	23.1 (73.6)	20.0 (68.0)	15.6 (60.1)	11.3 (52.3)	8.6 (47.5)	15.4 (59.7)
Mean daily minimum °C (°F)	1.9 (35.4)	2.0 (35.6)	3.5 (38.3)	5.2 (41.4)	8.3 (46.9)	11.3 (52.3)	13.4 (56.1)	13.2 (55.8)	10.6 (51.1)	7.9 (46.2)	4.5 (40.1)	2.3 (36.1)	7.0 (44.6)
Average rainfall mm (inches)	62.9 (2.48)	49.1 (1.93)	42.4 (1.67)	45.6 (1.80)	51.8 (2.04)	50.2 (1.98)	48.6 (1.91)	56.6 (2.23)	51.4 (2.02)	70.2 (2.76)	71.4 (2.81)	63.1 (2.48)	663.3 (26.11)
Average rainy days (≥ 1 mm)	11.6	10.1	9.1	9.4	8.6	8.6	8.1	9.4	8.5	10.7	11.6	11.3	117.0
Source: Met Office

== Demography ==
Northolt is covered by two electoral wards of the London Borough of Ealing. Northolt Mandeville ward covers the main area of Northolt. Northolt West End ward covers the area south of the A40 road, including housing that is contiguous from Yeading directly to the south.

2011 Census homes %
Ward	Detached	Semi-detached	Terraced	Flats and apartments
Northolt Mandeville	3.7%	29.6%	25.3%	40.8%
Northolt West End	3.0%	26.4%	17.4%	53.1%

The median house price as of 2014 was £300,000 in Northolt Mandeville and £226,111 in Northolt West End. The population who are from BAME (Black, Asian and minority Ethnic) background was 51.7% and 55.1% respectively. The median age was 34 years and 32 years respectively.

=== Population ===
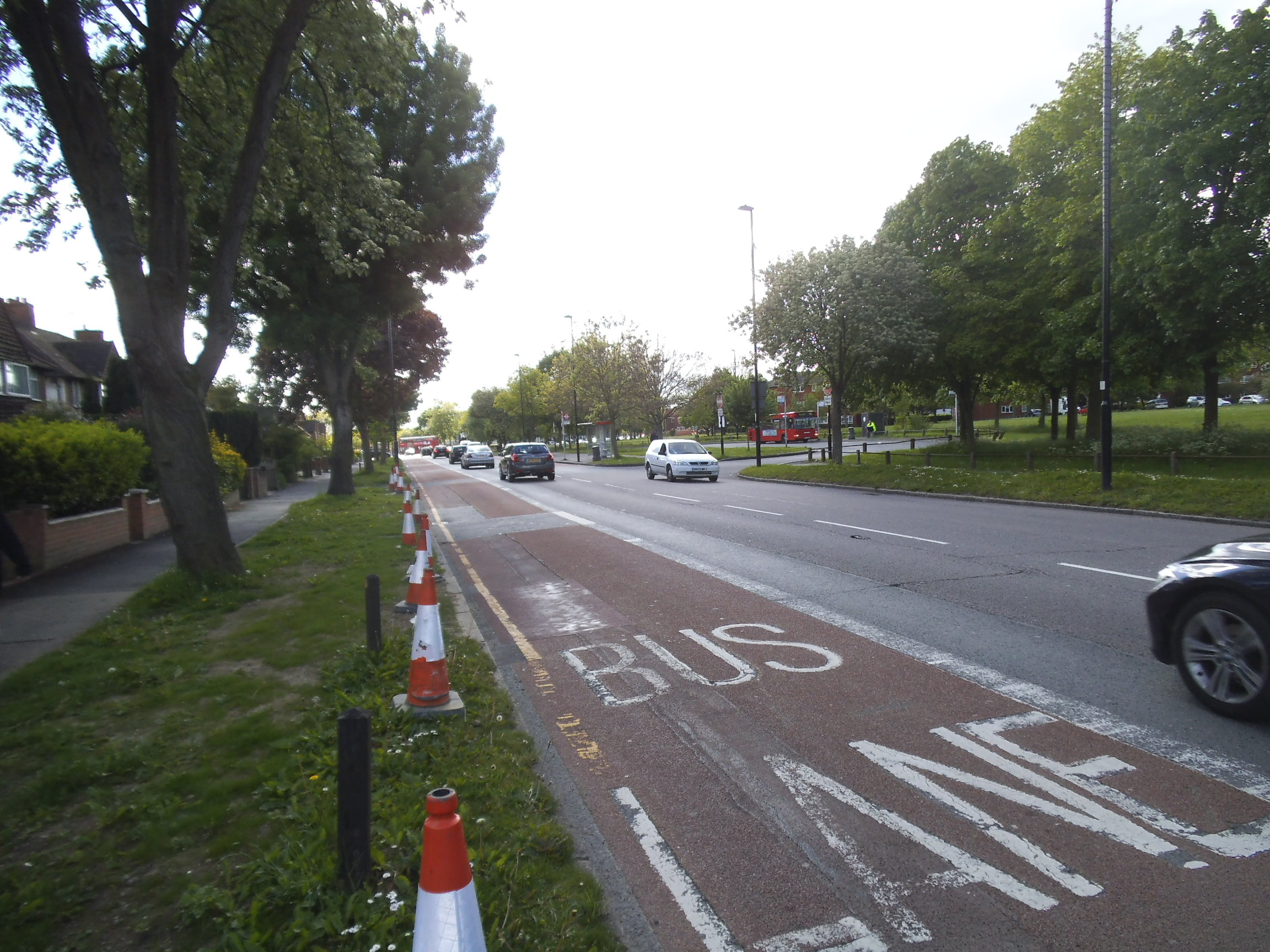
Mandeville Road (A312), the main throughfare of Northolt

While Northolt remained a rural, agricultural area in the 19th century, its population growth remained slow:

- 1066 – 32
- 1801 – 336 inhabitants
- 1871 – 479
- 1921 – 904
- 1961 – 26,000
- 1991 – 32,000

The rapid growth of the population in the mid-20th century can be explained by Northolt's growth as a dormitory town for nearby Ealing, and the construction in 1935 of the A40 road through the area. Modern family homes were built in the 1920s and 1930s. In the 1950s and 1960s, predominantly local authority rented housing was constructed. 3,423 council houses had been built in Northolt by 1963. Northolt tube station was opened in 1948 to serve the growing population of the area.

== Crime ==
Anti-social behaviour has recently been the most common reported crime, followed by violent and sexual offences. Crime levels notably increased, by up to 50% between 2013 and 2014. A knifeman took relatives hostage at a flat in 1985. Jimmy Canning, IRA member, lived undercover in Northolt from 1991 to 1993; he had wooed local Audrey Lamb and moved into her house at 15 Islip Gardens, using it as a weapons and bomb storage depot. He and Lamb were arrested in 1992 following police surveillance.

== Pony racing ==
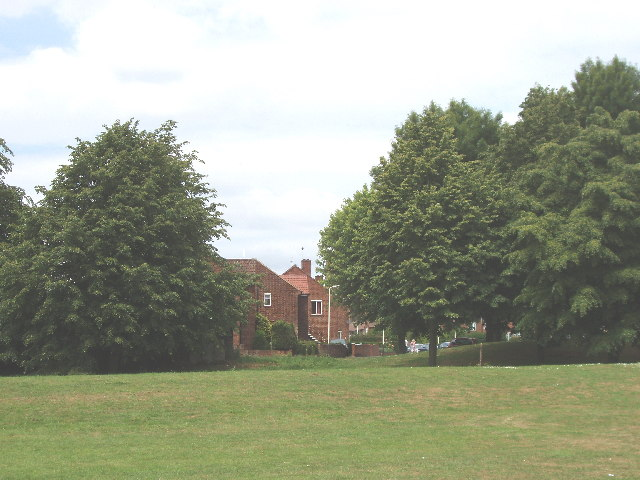
Racecourse Estate: this area was used for horse racing in the early 20th century

Northolt was famous for the pony racing which took place in Northolt Park. A one-and-a-half mi (2.4 km) racecourse was constructed by Sir William Bass and Viscount Lascelles, and opened in 1929 by the Earl of Harewood and his wife the Princess Royal.

During the Second World War, the land was taken over and used as an army depot and prisoner of war camp. Despite numerous attempts to revive pony racing after the war the land was given over to housing construction. The Racecourse Estate was constructed between 1951 and 1955 in order to solve a severe housing shortage within the borough. The gates of the original racecourse remain in Petts Hill, and a section of the track can be observed as a long, flat stretch of land alongside Mandeville Road.

== Education ==
- Alec Reed Academy (formerly West London Academy)
- Belvue High School
- Gifford Primary School
- Greenwood Primary School
- Northolt High School
- Petts Hill Primary School
- St. Raphael's Catholic Primary School
- Downe Manor Primary School
- Viking Primary School
- Willow Tree Primary School
- Wood End Primary School
- Wood End Academy

== Transport ==
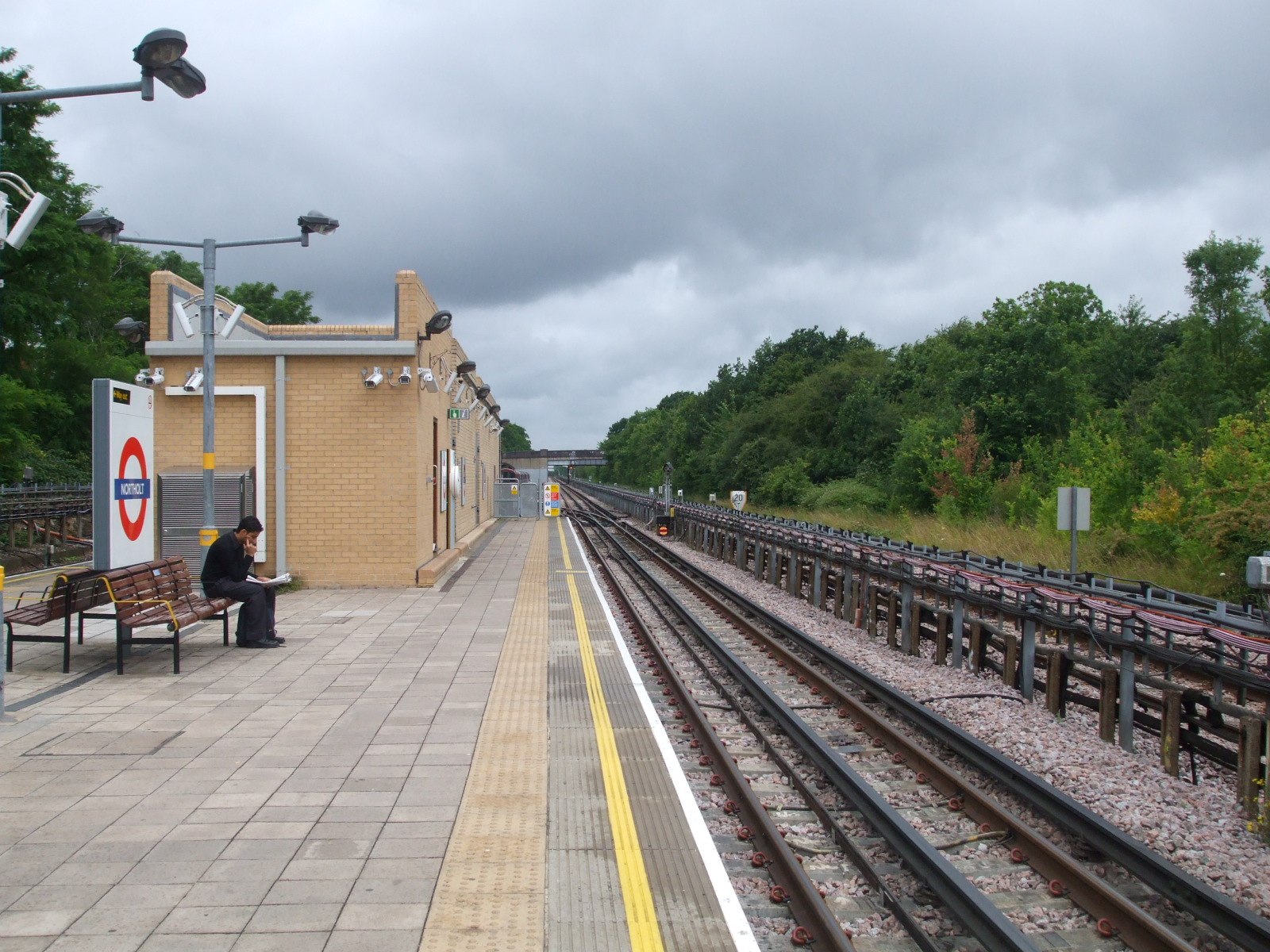
Northolt Station

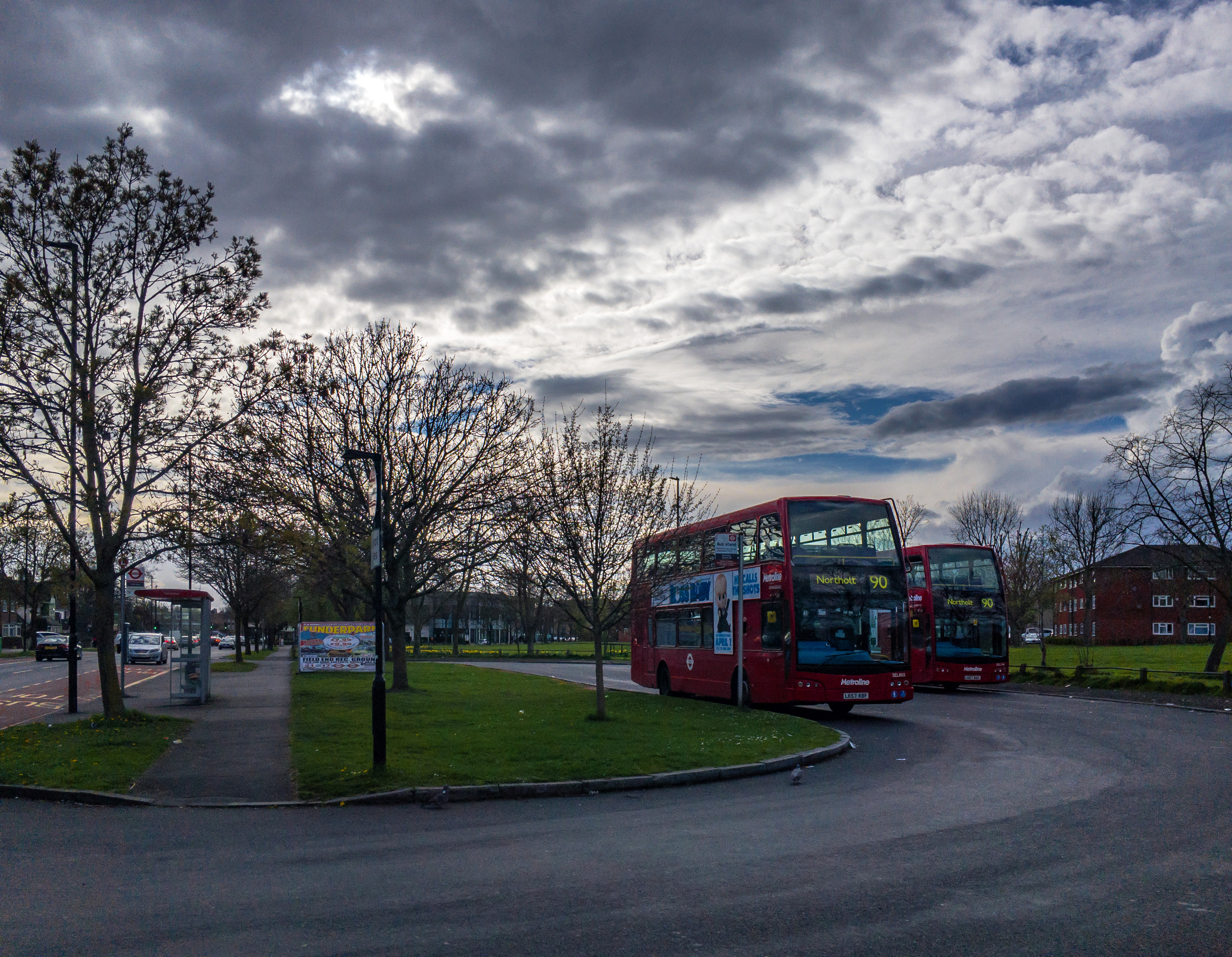
Bus stand of route 90 on Mandeville Road

Northolt has two stations: Northolt on the London Underground Central line and Northolt Park, a Network Rail station served by Chiltern Railways. Numerous London Buses routes serve Northolt.

== Political representation ==
The constituency of Ealing North is currently represented by Labour and Co-operative Party Member of Parliament (MP) James Murray, and has been since 2019 following the retirement of Stephen Pound.

Northolt is made up of two electoral wards (Northolt Mandeville and Northolt West End), as well as part of the electoral ward of North Greenford, which elect councillors to Ealing Council. As of 6 May 2022 the area is represented by six Labour councillors (three in West End and three in Mandeville).

Northolt comes under the London Assembly constituency of Ealing and Hillingdon which has one assembly member, currently Bassam Mahfouz (Labour), who was elected in May 2024.

Political status on Ealing Council as of May 2022:

- Labour: 59 seats
- Conservative: 5 seats
- Liberal Democrats: 6 seats

On 1 October 1928 the civil parish was abolished and merged with Ealing and Harrow on the Hill. At the 1921 census (the last before the abolition of the parish), Northolt had a population of 904.

== Notable people ==
- Michael Colclough, canon pastor at St Paul's Cathedral and deputy priest in ordinary to the queen; archdeacon of Northolt 1992–4
- Alton Ellis (1938–2008), musician, "godfather of Rocksteady"; lived in Northolt
- Paul Gardiner (1958–1984), musician, bass guitar player in Gary Numan's Tubeway Army; died in Northolt
- Bassam Mahfouz, politician; grew up in Northolt

== Television ==
- The BBC comedy series My Hero, produced between 2000 and 2006, and featuring Ardal O'Hanlon and Emily Joyce, was set in Northolt.
- A faux documentary titled Ghostwatch, broadcast on Halloween in 1992, was filmed in Northolt. It was the tale of a single mother haunted in her Northolt home by a mysterious figure called "Pipes".

== Sources ==
- A History of Middlesex (1971)
- History of Northolt
