= Matthias Mawson =

English clergyman (1683–1770)

The Right Reverend Matthias Mawson
- Bishop of Ely
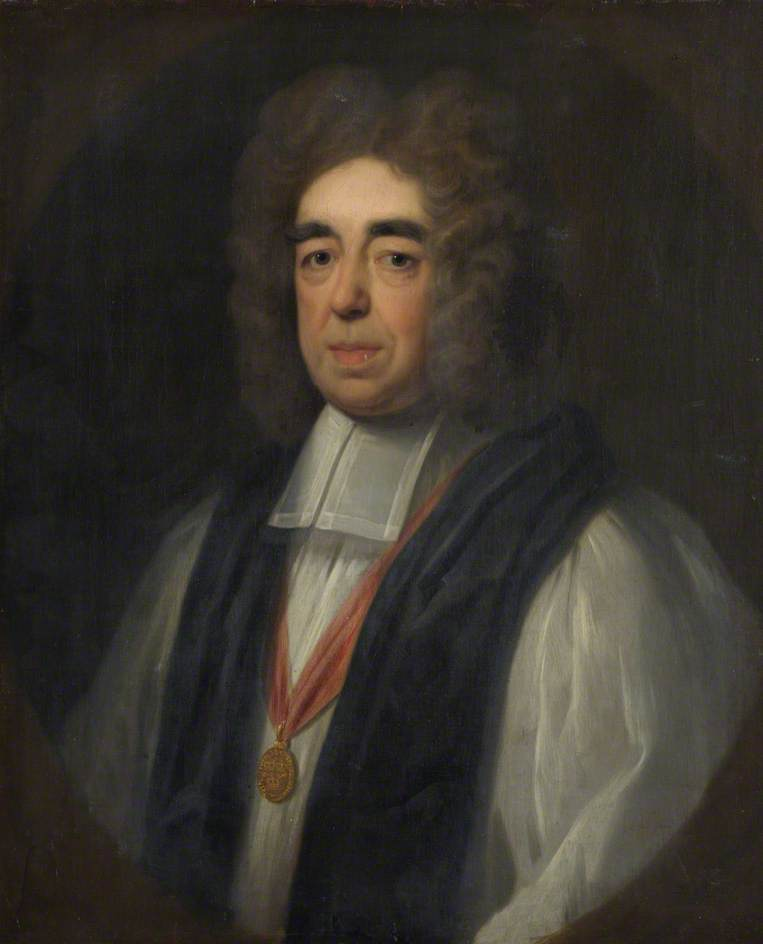
- Portrait by John Theodore Heins
- Diocese: Diocese of Ely
- In office: 1754–1771
- Predecessor: Thomas Gooch
- Successor: Edmund Keene
- Other posts: Bishop of Llandaff (1738–1740); Bishop of Chichester (1740–1754)

Orders
- Consecration: 18 February 1739 by John Potter

Personal details
- Born: August 1683
- Died: 23 November 1770 (aged 87)
- Buried: Ely Cathedral
- Denomination: Anglican
- Education: St Paul's School, London
- Alma mater: Corpus Christi College, Cambridge

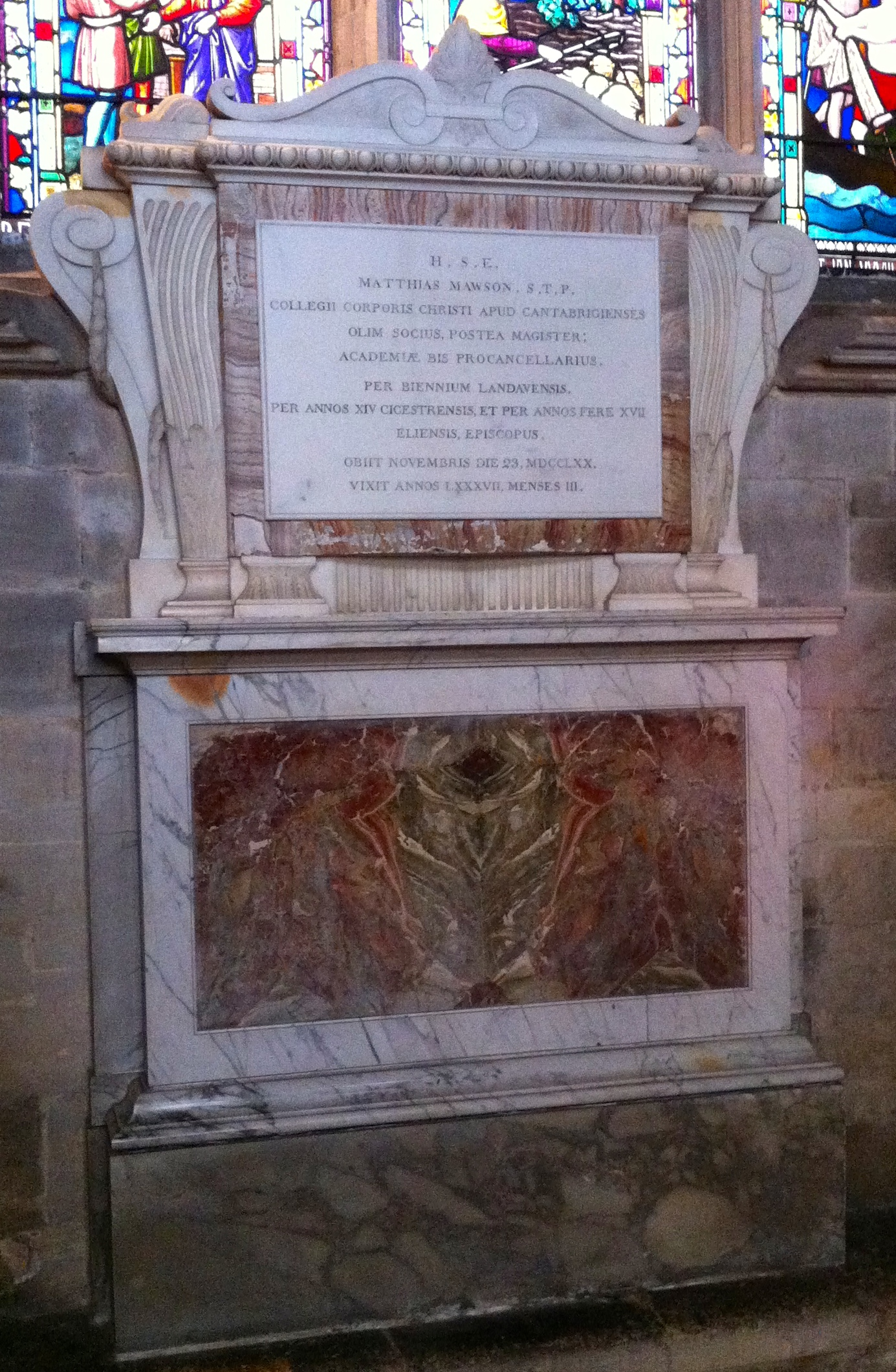
Memorial to Bishop Matthias Mawson in Ely Cathedral

Matthias Mawson (August 1683 – 23 November 1770) was an English clergyman and academic who served as Master of Corpus Christi College, Cambridge and subsequently as Bishop of Llandaff, Bishop of Chichester, and Bishop of Ely.

== Life ==
He was born in August 1683, his father being a prosperous brewer at Chiswick, Middlesex. He was educated at St Paul's School, and was admitted in 1701 to Corpus Christi College, Cambridge. He graduated B.A. 1704, M.A. 1708, B.D. 1716, D.D. 1725. He was a fellow of his college in 1707, and a moderator in the university in 1708. On 6 October 1724 he was appointed as master of his college, and held the office till 20 February 1744. Soon after his appointment he was presented by Bishop Thomas Green to the rectory of Conington in Cambridgeshire, and afterwards to that of Hadstock in Essex; the latter he held for many years. In 1730 and 1731 he was a reforming vice-chancellor of the university, in particular prohibiting the practice of exhuming bodies from the neighbouring churchyard, for dissection by medical students.

After refusing the bishopric of Gloucester in 1734, Mawson was consecrated bishop of Llandaff, 18 February 1739. This diocese he administered for two years, and in 1740 was translated to Chichester. On the death of Sir Thomas Gooch in 1754, he was translated again, to Ely, where he remained for the rest of his life.

According to Arthur Collins' Peerage of England (1756) he married Penelope Compton, a daughter of Hatton Compton (d.1741) of Grendon Hall in Northamptonshire, Lieutenant of the Tower of London and a grandson of Spencer Compton, 2nd Earl of Northampton. However the Dictionary of National Biography (1885-1900) states that he was unmarried. He died at his house in Kensington Square, 23 November 1770, aged eighty-seven years and three months, having been active and healthy until before his death. He was buried in his cathedral of Ely, and a monument was erected to his memory by his chaplain and executor, Dr. Warren.

== Legacy ==
Mawson's official income and his inheritance of the fortune made by his brother in the family business gave him great wealth. To King's College, Cambridge, he made a large loan for their new buildings. At Ely he gave £1,000 to the cathedral. He also endowed Corpus Christi in 1754 with property sufficient to found twelve scholarships.

== Works ==
Mawson's published works consist of single sermons, preached at anniversary gatherings, and the like, and a speech made before the gentlemen of Sussex, at Lewes, 11 October 1745, on the occasion of the Jacobite rising of 1745.

== Notes ==
Academic offices
Preceded by Samuel Bradford	Master of Corpus Christi College, Cambridge; 1724–1744	Succeeded by Edmund Castle
Church of England titles
Preceded by John Harris	Bishop of Llandaff; 1738–1740	Succeeded by John Gilbert
Preceded by Francis Hare	Bishop of Chichester; 1740–1754	Succeeded by Sir William Ashburnham
Preceded by Thomas Gooch	Bishop of Ely; 1754–1771	Succeeded by Edmund Keene
