= Richard Laughton =

English churchman and academic

Richard Laughton (1670?–1723) was an English churchman and academic, now known as a natural philosopher and populariser of the ideas of Isaac Newton.

== Early life ==
Originally from London, he was educated at Clare College, Cambridge, where he was admitted as a sizar in 1680. He graduated B.A. in 1685, proceeded M.A. in 1691, and was created D.D. by mandate in 1717.

About 1693 Laughton was chaplain to John Moore, the bishop of Norwich. In 1694 he was appointed tutor of his college, and in this capacity he acquired a reputation. John Colbatch, in his commemoration sermon preached in Trinity College Chapel, 17 December 1717, said of Laughton "We see what a conflux of nobility and gentry the virtue of one man draws daily to one of our least colleges". More colloquially, he was called a "pupil-monger". Among his pupils were Martin Folkes, Benjamin Ibbot, and Robert Greene. He encouraged the study of Newton's Principia.

In politics Laughton was a Whig. He had the backing of Simon Patrick, the bishop of Ely, in college matters, who wrote to the Master of Clare, Samuel Blythe, on his behalf in 1697. Later Moore, who succeeded Patrick in the see, acted in the same way.

== Proctor ==
Laughton became vicar of Stow-cum-Quy in 1709. He was a supporter of the Newtonian philosophy; and when in 1710–1711 he had as senior proctor to appoint a moderator for the examinations, he took on the duty himself. He brought forward questions on the Newtonian theory; and divided candidates into two classes. In the history of the Tripos, his attention to the provisions of Elizabethan statutes allowing M.A.'s to question the B.A. candidates is considered another factor in the development of a differentiated examination system.

Samuel Clarke, in the preface to his edition of Jacques Rohault's treatise on Physics, acknowledged his obligation to Laughton. W. W. Rouse Ball thought that Laughton was a significant influence on Clarke, who offered a Newtonian proposition in 1711. It is now argued that John Ellys is the likely source in this case. Laughton did induce William Browne, of Peterhouse, to tackle a mathematical question.

== Later life ==
William Whiston called Laughton a friend and excellent tutor; and recorded his vain efforts to turn him back from his adoption of Arianism. It was to Laughton that Lady Masham addressed a well-known letter describing the closing scene of John Locke's life.

Laughton was on close terms with Richard Bentley. He met Conrad von Uffenbach, who visited Cambridge in 1710. That year he was, as proctor, a prominent reformer of academic discipline; his efforts involved him in clashes with other leading members of the university, including Conyers Middleton and Thomas Gooch, who found him officious. Laughton's targets included Stourbridge fair and coffee houses. He also closed clubs and broke up gatherings at taverns. The incident with Middleton was a party at the Rose Tavern, and involved drinking the health of the high Tory Henry Sacheverell on 3 July 1710, which Laughton reported to the authorities. The political atmosphere ahead of the general election of October 1710 was fraught: Laughton was a known Whig militant, and his action brought a tit-for-tat reprisal by Tories.

In 1713 Laughton was an unsuccessful candidate for the mastership of his college, in an election that saw political tensions in Clare itself. Robert Greene, his former pupil, made clear his Tory allegiance. William Grigg was elected; in fact both he and Laughton were allies of Bentley and his reformist programme. Taking on George Parker as pupil in 1715, Laughton also reported to his father Lord Parker, the prominent Whig, on university politics. Laughton and Parker's agent Thomas Bell were heavily involved in supporting candidates for head of house, such as John Davies of Queens'.

In 1717 Laughton preached before King George I; his prominence has led to a tentative identification in the Dunciad. He was installed prebendary of the eighth stall in Worcester Cathedral. He died on 28 July 1723.

== Works ==
Laughton published A Sermon preach'd before the King at King's College Chapel in Cambridge (1717). He published some verses, and left in manuscript his speech, as senior proctor, in the bachelors' schools, and On Natural Religion.

== Notes ==
Attribution

This article incorporates text from a publication now in the public domain: Lee, Sidney, ed. (1892). "Laughton, Richard". Dictionary of National Biography. Vol. 32. London: Smith, Elder & Co.
