= John Leng =

John Leng may refer to:

- John Leng (politician) (1828–1906), newspaper proprietor and Liberal Party politician in Scotland
- John Leng (bishop) (1665–1727), English churchman and academic, bishop of Norwich, 1723–1727
