= Lectionary 169 =

Greek manuscript of the New Testament

Lectionary ℓ 169
- New Testament manuscript
- Text: Apostolarion
- Date: 13th century
- Script: Greek
- Found: Thomas Payne in 1738
- Now at: British Library
- Size: 28 by 20.5 cm

Lectionary 169, designated by siglum ℓ 169 (in the Gregory-Aland numbering) is a Greek manuscript of the New Testament, on parchment leaves. Paleographically it has been assigned to the 13th century. Formerly it was labelled as Lectionary 65^{a} (Gregory) or as 52^{a} by Scrivener.

== Description ==
The codex contains Lessons from the Acts and Epistles lectionary (Apostolarion), on 192 parchment leaves (28 cm by 20.5 cm), with lacunae at the end. The text is written in Greek minuscule letters, in two columns per page, 29 lines per page. It contains music notes.

== History ==
The manuscript was brought by Thomas Payne, English Chaplain in Constantinople, to England in 1738 and was presented by him to Charles Herzog from Marlborough. Then it was held in Belsheim (3. C. 12). The manuscript was shown to Bentley.

The manuscript is not cited in the critical editions of the Greek New Testament (UBS3).

Currently the codex is located in the British Library (Add. 32051) at London.

== See also ==
- List of New Testament lectionaries
- Biblical manuscript
- Textual criticism
