= Gresham Professor of Rhetoric =

The Professor of Rhetoric at Gresham College, London, gives free educational lectures to the general public. The college was founded for this purpose in 1597 when it created seven professorships; this was later increased to ten. Rhetoric is one of the original professorships as set out by the will of Thomas Gresham in 1575.

The title is a broad one; Professors of Rhetoric have included historians, poets, educators and literary critics. The Professor of Rhetoric is appointed in partnership with the Worshipful Company of Mercers. The current postholder is Emma Smith.

== List of Gresham Professors of Rhetoric ==
Note, years given as, for example 1596 / 1597, refer to Old Style and New Style dates.

| | Name | Started |
|---|---|---|
| 1 | Caleb Willis | March 1596 / 1597 |
| 2 | Richard Ball | 1598 |
| 3 | Charles Croke | 14 January 1613 / 1614 |
| 4 | Henry Croke | 26 May 1619 |
| 5 | Edward Wilkinson | 13 April 1627 |
| 6 | John Goodridge | 6 November 1638 |
| 7 | Richard Hunt | 29 November 1654 |
| 8 | William Croune FRS | 8 June 1659 |
| 9 | Henry Jenkes | 21 October 1670 |
| 10 | John King | 2 October 1676 |
| 11 | Charles Gresham | 20 August 1686 |
| 12 | Edward Martyn | 4 December 1696 |
| 13 | John Ward | 1 September 1720 |
| 14 | Joseph Whateley | 19 January 1759 |
| 15 | Joseph Thomas Waugh | 11 April 1797 |
| 16 | F Newnham | 7 January 1808 |
| 17 | Edward Owen | 13 November 1817 |
| 18 | Charlton Lane | 23 April 1863 |
| 19 | Thomas Francis Dallin | 9 July 1875 |
| 20 | J E Nixon | 4 February 1881 |
| 21 | Foster Watson | 22 January 1915 |
| 22 | Oliver Elton | 19 April 1929 |
| 23 | George Stuart Gordon | 2 May 1930 |
| 24 | Arthur William Reed | 8 December 1933 |
1939–1945 Lectures in abeyance
| 25 | Rowland Walter Jepson | 6 June 1946 |
| 26 | Lord David Cecil | 27 June 1947 |
| 27 | Nevill Coghill | 14 October 1948 |
| 28 | William Empson | 1953 |
| 29 | Richard Hughes | 1954 |
| 30 | Bonamy Dobrée | 1957 |
| 31 | Stephen Spender | 1961 |
| 32 | John Wain | 1963 (Hilary term) |
| 33 | Cecil Day-Lewis | 1963–1964 |
| 34 | Patric Dickinson | 1965–1967 |
| 35 | Sir Robert Birley | 1968–1982 |
1983–1984 vacant
| 36 | John Morley Pick | 1985 |
| 37 | Jan Kott | 1986 |
| 38 | John Morley Pick | 1987 |
| 39 | John Malcolm Rae | 1988 |
| 40 | Sir Andrew Derbyshire | 1990 |
| 41 | Peter G. Moore | 1 September 1992 |
| 42 | Peter Hennessy | 1 September 1994 |
| 43 | Lynette Hunter | 1 September 1997 |
| 44 | Richard Sorabji CBE FBA | 1 September 2000 |
| 45 | Kathleen Burk | 1 September 2003 |
| 46 | Rodney Barker | 1 September 2006 |
| 47 | Sir Richard J. Evans | 1 September 2009 |
| 48 | Belinda Jack | 1 September 2013 |
| 49 | Sir Jonathan Bate CBE FBA FRSL | 1 September 2017 |
| 50 | Joanna Bourke FBA | 2019 |
| 51 | Melissa Lane | 2023 |
| 52 | Emma Smith | 2026 |
