= Robert Moss (priest) =

English churchman, controversialist and Dean of Ely (1666–1729)

Robert Moss (1666–1729) was an English churchman and controversialist, Dean of Ely from 1713.

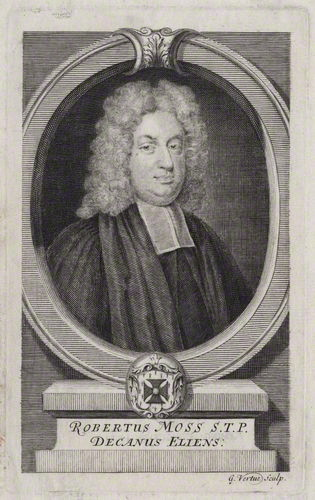
Robert Moss, 1736 engraving by George Vertue.

== Life ==
The eldest son of Robert and Mary Moss, he was born at Gillingham, Norfolk in 1666. His father was a country gentleman living at Postwick. After Norwich School he was admitted a sizar of Corpus Christi College, Cambridge, 19 April 1682, at the age of sixteen. He graduated B.A. 1685, M.A. 1688, B.D. 1696, D.D. 1705.

Soon after his first degree he was elected to a fellowship at Corpus. He was ordained deacon in 1688, and priest in 1690. In 1693 he was appointed by the university to be one of their twelve preachers, and his sermons at Great St. Mary's were popular. After missing by a few votes an appointment to the office of public orator at Cambridge in 1698, he was chosen preacher of Gray's Inn on 11 July of that year, in succession to Thomas Richardson, master of Peterhouse. In December 1716 he was allowed to nominate Thomas Gooch, master of Caius College, as his deputy in this office. Early in 1699 he was elected assistant-preacher at St. James's, Westminster, and was successively chaplain in ordinary to William III, Queen Anne, and George I. In 1708 the parishioners of St. Lawrence Jewry offered him their Tuesday lectureship, which he accepted, succeeding George Stanhope, who had become dean of Canterbury.

Moss's preferments were now numerous. The Master of his college, Thomas Greene, was of opinion that his fellowship was virtually rendered void. A long controversy followed between Moss and the Master, in which it was alleged that the total value of the church preferments held by Moss, £240 in all, was equivalent to six fellowships. The master, however, did not press the matter, and Moss retained his fellowship till 1714.

In 1708, or soon afterwards, he was collated to the rectory of Gilston, Hertfordshire; and on 16 May 1713 was installed dean of Ely. After suffering much from gout, he died 26 March 1729, and was buried in Ely Cathedral, where a Latin inscription with his arms (ermine, a cross patée) marks his resting-place. The bulk of his fortune, less an endowment for a sizarship at Caius College, was bequeathed to one of his nephews, Charles Moss, bishop of Bath and Wells.

== Works ==
Moss is described as an excellent preacher and a kind and loyal friend. His sermons were collected and published in 1736, in 8 vols., with a biographical preface by Zachary Grey, who had married one of his step-daughters. An engraved portrait of the author by Vertue is prefixed.

== Family ==
He married a Mrs. Hinton of Cambridge, who survived him, but he left no issue.
