= Samuel Lisle =

British bishop

The Right Reverend Samuel Lisle
- Bishop of Norwich
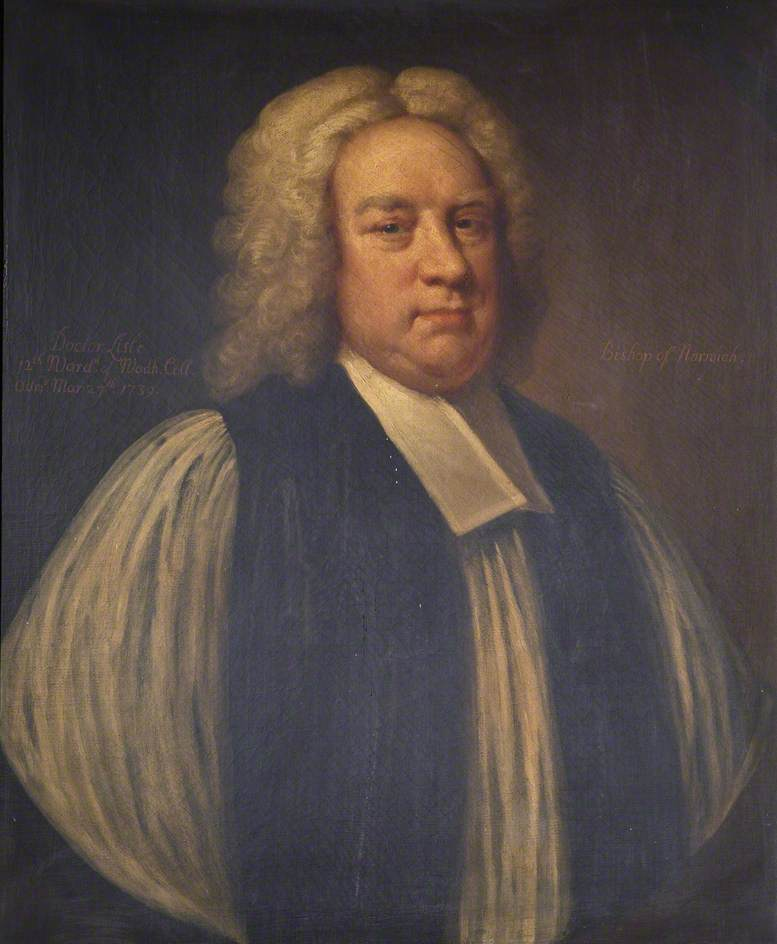
- Diocese: Diocese of Norwich
- In office: 1748–1749
- Predecessor: Thomas Gooch
- Successor: Thomas Hayter
- Other post: Bishop of St Asaph (1743–1748)

Personal details
- Born: 1683 Blandford, Dorset, England
- Died: 3 October 1749 (aged 65–66) London, England
- Buried: St Mary the Virgin, Northolt
- Denomination: Anglican
- Education: Wadham College, Oxford

Samuel Lisle FRS (1683 – 3 October 1749) was an English academic and bishop.

== Life ==
Lisle was born in Blandford, Dorset. He graduated M.A. at Wadham College, Oxford, in 1706, and was ordained in 1707.

He was chaplain to the Levant Company from 1710 to 1719. On his return he advocated for a better Bible translation in Arabic. He was rector of Tooting in 1720. He became Archdeacon of Canterbury in 1724 and Warden of Wadham College, Oxford, in 1739. He was also rector of St Mary-le-Bow, from 1721 to 1744; and rector of Northolt, from 1729. He was Bishop of St Asaph, in 1744, and the bishop of Norwich, in 1748.

He died in London and was buried at St Mary the Virgin, Northolt, Middlesex.

== Works ==
He collected inscriptions during his Levant chaplaincy, and they were printed in the Antiquitates Asiaticae of Edmund Chishull (1728).

== Notes ==
Academic offices
Preceded by Robert Thistlethwayt	Warden of Wadham College, Oxford; 1761–1776	Succeeded by George Wyndham
Church of England titles
Preceded by John Thomas	Bishop of St Asaph; 1743–1748	Succeeded by Robert Hay Drummond
Preceded by Thomas Gooch	Bishop of Norwich; 1748–1749	Succeeded by Thomas Hayter
