= Charles Croke =

English priest & academic

Charles Croke (died 1657) was an English clergyman and Gresham Professor of Rhetoric.

== Life ==
He was the third son of Sir John Croke, and was admitted student of Christ Church, Oxford, on 5 January 1604. He proceeded B.A. (1608), M.A.(1611), B.D. and D.D. (1625). He was tutor of his college, and held the professorship of rhetoric at Gresham College, London, from 1613 to 1619. He was junior proctor (1613), and fellow of Eton College (1617–1621).

He became rector of Waterstock, Oxfordshire, on the presentation of his uncle, Sir George Croke, on 24 June 1616, and rector of Agmondisham, Buckinghamshire, in 1621. He took private pupils at Agmondisham, and among them were Sir William Drake, Sir Robert Croke, John Gregory, and Henry Curwen, son of Sir Patricius Curwen. Curwen died while in Croke's charge, and Croke published a memorial sermon. Later there were George Savile from 1641, and Charles Bertie who was attending the school when Croke closed it at the end of 1650.

At the end of his life Croke went to Ireland, having petitioned Oliver Cromwell for leave to bring Edward Terry (son of Edward Terry the travel writer) to Amersham in his place. He died at Carlow 10 April 1657.
