= Robert Butts (bishop) =

English churchman

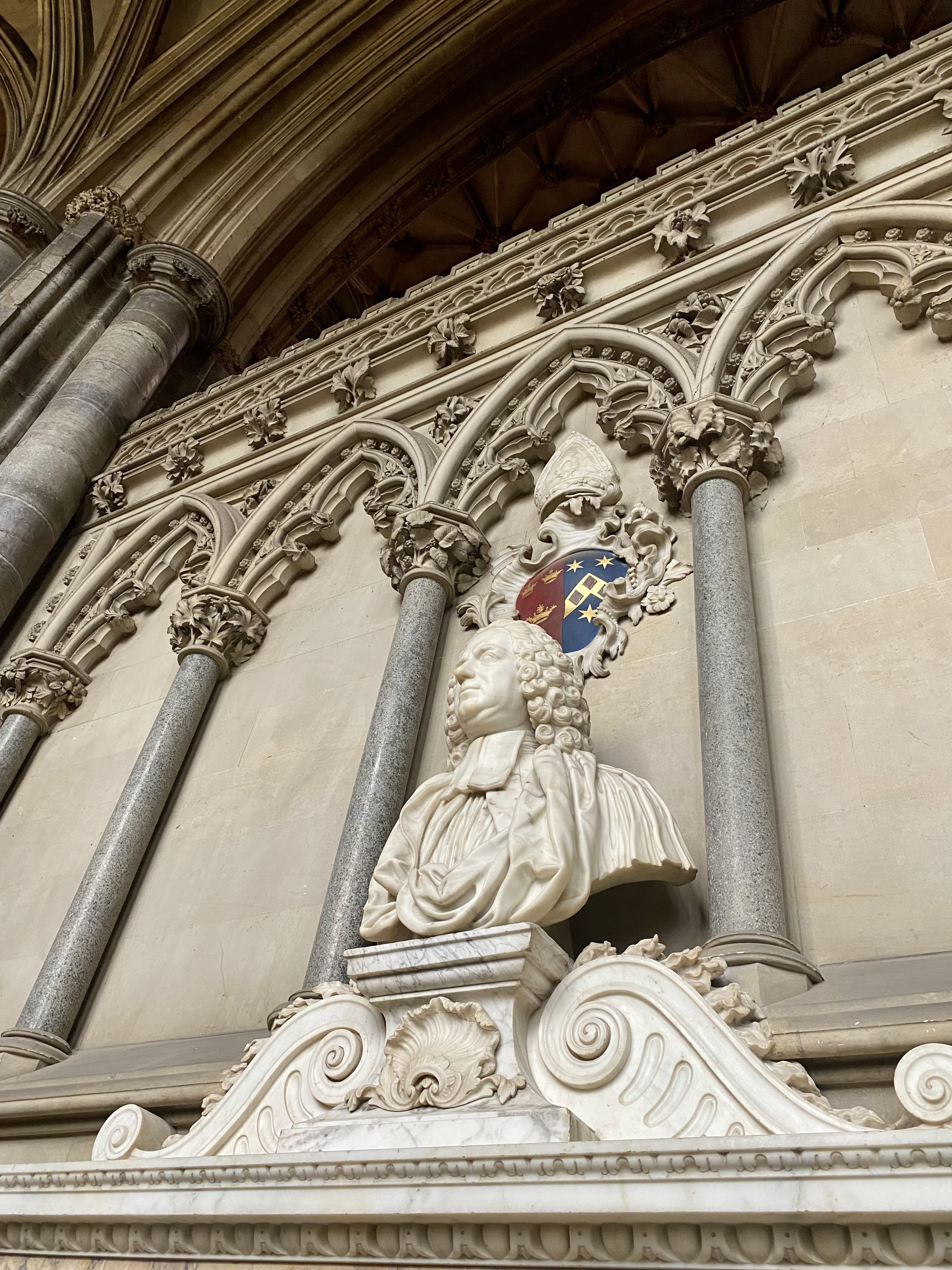
Bust of Robert Butts in Ely Cathedral

Robert Butts (1684–1748) was an English churchman and strong partisan of the administration of Sir Robert Walpole, successively Bishop of Norwich and Bishop of Ely.

== Life ==
He was the son of the Revd William Butts, rector of Hartest, near Bury St. Edmunds, Suffolk. He was educated at the grammar school at Bury, and Trinity College, Cambridge, where he graduated as B.A. 1707, M.A. 1711, and D.D. 1728. As an undergraduate he was famous as a boxer and football player. After his ordination he served as curate of Thurlow, and in 1703 was chosen one of the preachers of Bury. Here he rendered political services to the Hervey family. He was a party agent, useful in elections to John, Lord Hervey, son of John Hervey, 1st Earl of Bristol, Lord Privy Seal in Sir Robert Waipole's administration.

In 1717 Butts was appointed by Lord Bristol to the family living of Ickworth, and in 1728 he became chaplain to George II, receiving his degree of D.D. at the same time by royal mandate. Three years later, on 6 February 1731, he was appointed dean of Norwich, retaining the living of Ickworth in commendam, till his succession to the bishopric on 20 January 1733. He was consecrated by Bishop Edmund Gibson of London, at Bow Church, 25 February. A competent but unpopular bishop, he was translated to the see of Ely in 1638, but spent little time there. During the latter years of his life Butts was crippled with gout. He died at Ely House, Holborn, 26 January 1748, and was buried in the south aisle of the choir of Ely Cathedral, under a marble monument. He published little.

== Family ==
Butts was twice married. His first wife was Miss Elizabeth Eyton, who died of consumption in 1734, at the age of forty-four, leaving two sons and five daughters. She was buried in the chapel of the bishop's palace at Norwich. He remarried to the daughter of the Revd Mr Reynolds of Bury, aged 23, by whom he had six more daughters. After his death in 1753, she then took as her second husband George Green, the receiver of the late bishop's rents, but they separated, and Mrs Green retired to Chichester, where she died 3 December 1781, at the age of sixty-nine.

Church of England titles
Preceded by William Baker	Bishop of Norwich; 1733–1738	Succeeded by Thomas Gooch
Preceded by Thomas Green	Bishop of Ely; 1738–1748	Succeeded by Thomas Gooch
