= Robert Thistlethwayte =

Robert Thistlethwayte (baptized 16 December 1690 – c. January, 1744) was the third son of Francis Thistlethwayte (b. 1658) of Winterslow, Wiltshire. He was a Warden of Wadham College, Oxford and a clergyman in the Church of England.

In 1737 Thistlethwayte fled to Boulogne after being accused of making homosexual advances towards a student, William French, whose tutor John Swinton was also accused of homosexual practices. Satirical poetry was written about these events. The following limerick probably also refers to Thistlethwayte:

There once was a Warden of Wadham
Who approved of the folkways of Sodom,

For a man might, he said,
Have a very poor head

But be a fine Fellow, at bottom.

Allegations of homosexual behaviour, which was considered scandalous at that time, and the College's decision to take out fire insurance combined to prompt the following verse:

Well did the am'rous sons of Wadham
Insure their house 'gainst future flame;
They knew their crime, the crime of Sodom,
And judg'd their punishment the same.

Academic offices
Preceded by William Baker	Warden of Wadham College, Oxford; 1723–1739	Succeeded by Samuel Lisle
