= Rodney Barker =

British academic and political commentator

Rodney Barker 1942-2025 was a British academic and political commentator. He was Professor of Government at the London School of Economics and Political Science and was Professor of Rhetoric at Gresham College in London from September 2006 to September 2009. He was married to the medical sociologist Helen Roberts.

After gaining his BA in History from Downing College, Cambridge, he undertook a PhD at the London School of Economics and Political Science, jointly supervised by Richard Titmuss in the Department of Social Administration, and Robert McKenzie in the Department of Sociology. His first full academic position was as a lecturer in Politics in the Department of Political Theory and Government of University College Swansea, a position he held between 1967 and 1971. After that, he returned to the London School of Economics and Political Science in 1971 and has held the positions of Lecturer, Senior Lecturer, Reader and Professor of Government. He was an Honorary Research Fellow at the University of Glasgow between 1990 and 1991.

As well as numerous scholarly articles, he published widely in the British broadsheet newspapers and was an opera critic for Tribune.

== Books ==
- Making Enemies, Palgrave Macmillan, 2007, ISBN 978-0-230-51681-6
- Legitimating Identities, Cambridge University Press, 2001, ISBN 978-0-521-00425-1
- Political Ideas and Political Action, Blackwell, 2000, ISBN 0-631-22142-5
- Political Ideas in Modern Britain, Routledge, 1997, ISBN 0-415-07121-6
