= Emma Smith (scholar) =

English academic, author, and Shakespeare scholar

Professor Emma Smith
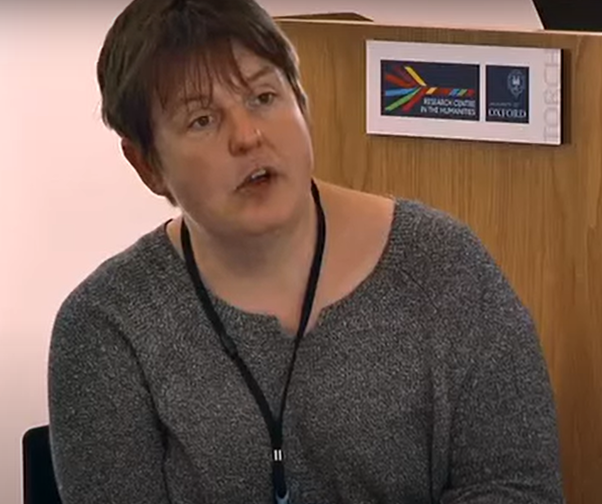
- Smith in 2013
- Born: Emma Josephine Smith; 15 May 1970 (age 56); Leeds, West Yorkshire, England
- Occupations: Historian and academic
- Title: Professor of Shakespeare Studies
- Board member of: Royal Shakespeare Company

Academic background
- Education: Abbey Grange School
- Alma mater: Somerville College, Oxford
- Thesis: Sifting strangers: some aspects of the representation of the European foreigner in the English drama, 1580-1617 (1997)

Academic work
- Discipline: English literature
- Sub-discipline: William Shakespeare; History of the book; English Renaissance theatre
- Institutions: All Souls College, Oxford; New Hall, Cambridge; Hertford College, Oxford
- Notable works: Portable Magic: A History of Books and their Readers

Emma Josephine Smith (born 15 May 1970) is an English literary scholar and academic whose research focuses on early modern drama, particularly William Shakespeare, and the history of the book. She has been a Tutorial Fellow in English at Hertford College, Oxford since 1997 and Professor of Shakespeare Studies at the University of Oxford since 2015.

She has published and lectured widely on Shakespeare and on other early modern dramatists, and worked with numerous theatre companies. Her lectures are available as podcasts Not Shakespeare: Elizabethan and Jacobean Popular Theatre and Approaching Shakespeare.

In 2026, Smith was appointed the 51st Gresham Professor of Rhetoric.

== Life and career ==
Born and raised in Leeds, Smith was educated at Abbey Grange school and did her undergraduate degree at Somerville College, Oxford, from 1988 to 1991. In an interview with the Oxford Review of Books, Smith said that she "didn't go to a school or come from a family where people particularly did go to Oxford" but that she also was not "from a terribly deprived background". She was a Prize Fellow at All Souls College, Oxford and completed her doctorate in 1997 during her fellowship at the college. Smith has credited the Prize Fellowship as helping her become an academic but said she found the time "isolating" and "felt the miss of having a graduate cohort". She joined Hertford College as Tutorial Fellow in English in 1997, having previously held a junior academic position at New Hall, Cambridge. In November 2015 she was awarded the Title of Distinction of Professor of Shakespeare Studies by the University of Oxford.

As part of her work on Shakespeare's First Folio, Smith worked with conservators, digital specialists and crowd-sourced funding on a Bodleian Library project to digitise a copy of the book. In 2016, she authenticated a new copy of the First Folio found at Mount Stuart House on the Isle of Bute.

With Laurie Maguire of Oxford University she published a new argument in 2012 that Shakespeare's play All's Well that Ends Well was a collaboration with Thomas Middleton. The New Oxford Shakespeare edition of 2016, edited by Bourus et al., was the first printed edition of the play to accept this joint attribution. Another article with Laurie Maguire won the 2014 Hoffman Prize. She was a script advisor to Josie Rourke's 2018 film Mary Queen of Scots and the BBC’s 2023 documentary series Shakespeare: The Rise of a Genius. She edits the Cambridge University Press journal Shakespeare Survey and is general editor of the Oxford World's Classics Shakespeare series for Oxford University Press.

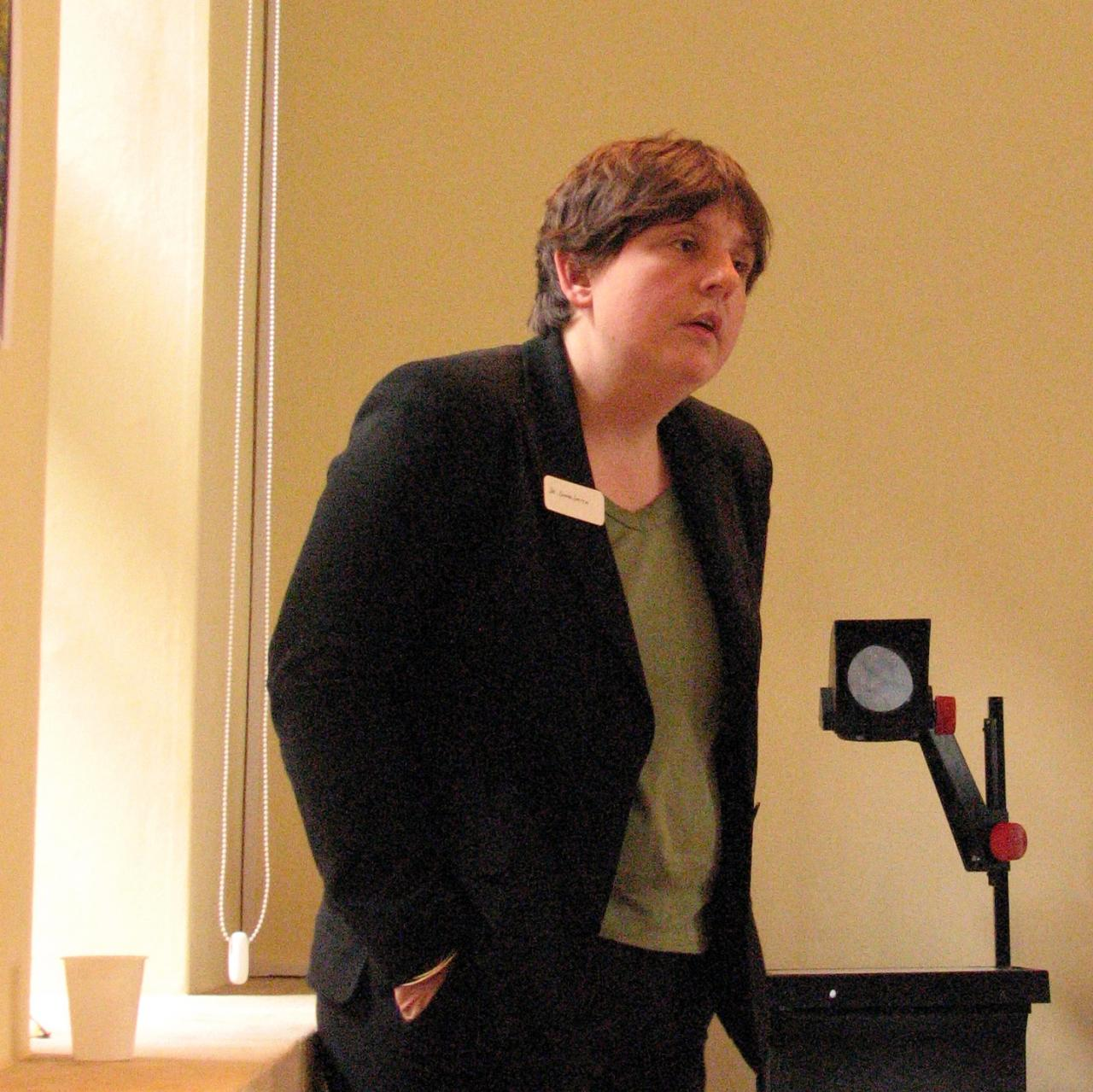
Smith in 2009

Smith published This Is Shakespeare in 2019. The book was published as a guide to Shakespeare's plays. It extends from her lectures for Oxford undergraduates, which were also used as the basis for her Approaching Shakespeare podcast, where she discusses 20 of Shakespeare's plays in chronological order. She says she wanted the book "to give a sense of Shakespeare's range across his career" but also "to keep the individual chapters self-contained, so that you could read one before going to the theatre." This is Shakespeare was well-received and "catapulted [Smith's] name into literary renown"; Smith said the response was "exciting and unexpected".

She was shortlisted for the 2023 Wolfson History Prize for Portable Magic, which she described as "a book about books, rather than words". In 2024 she was made an Honorary Bencher at Middle Temple. In September 2024 Smith joined the board of the Royal Shakespeare Company, having been named an Associate Scholar of the RSC in 2021. Her name is one of those featured on the sculpture Ribbons, unveiled in 2024.

In June 2025, Smith was elected to an honorary fellowship at her alma mater, Somerville College, Oxford.

In November 2026, Smith's appointment as the 51st Gresham Professor of Rhetoric at Gresham College was announced. In this role, she will deliver free public lectures on the subject of rhetoric, her first being entitled 'Shakespeare Now: Creativity and Controversy'.

=== Broadcasting ===
Smith has made numerous appearances as an expert commentator on the BBC Radio 4 discussion programme In Our Time. Episodes featuring Smith include: Marlowe (2005); Shakespeare's Plantagenet histories (2018); Macbeth (2020); Shakespeare's sonnets (2021); Romeo and Juliet (2022); Twelfth Night (2023); Thomas Middleton (2025); and Henry IV, Part 1 (2026). In August 2024 she also appeared on the Radio 4 series Great Lives discussing Marlowe with director Julien Temple.

== Personal life ==
Smith lives in Oxford with her partner Elizabeth.

== Bibliography ==
=== Selected publications ===
- Portable Magic: A History of Books and their Readers (Penguin, 2022) ISBN 9780241427262
- This Is Shakespeare (Pelican, 2019)
- Shakespeare’s First Folio: Four Centuries of an Iconic Book, (Oxford University Press, 2016)
- The Making of Shakespeare's First Folio, (Bodleian Publishing, 2015)
- Women on the Early Modern Stage: A Woman Killed with Kindness, The Tamer Tamed, The Duchess of Malfi, The Witch of Edmonton (2014)
- The Elizabethan Top Ten: Defining Print Popularity in Early Modern England. Eds. Andy Kesson and Emma Smith (Ashgate Publishing, Ltd., 2013) ISBN 9781472405876
- Five Revenge Tragedies: The Spanish Tragedy, Hamlet, Antonio's Revenge, The Tragedy of Hoffman, The Revenger's Tragedy (Penguin UK, 2012)
- The Cambridge Shakespeare Guide (Cambridge University Press, 2012)
- The Cambridge Introduction to Shakespeare (Cambridge University Press, 2007) ISBN 9781139462396
- Shakespeare's Comedies: a Guide to Criticism (Blackwell Guides to Criticism, 2003)
- Shakespeare's Histories: a Guide to Criticism (Blackwell Guides to Criticism, 2003)
- Shakespeare's Tragedies: a Guide to Criticism (Blackwell Guides to Criticism, 2003)
- Shakespeare in Production: Henry V (2000)
- Thomas Kyd: The Spanish Tragedie (ed. 1998)
