= Richard Reynolds (bishop) =

English bishop

Richard Reynolds (1674–1743) was an English bishop of Lincoln.

== Life ==
He was baptised at Leverington, near Wisbech, Cambridgeshire, on 17 July 1674, son of Richard Reynolds (1631–1682), rector of Leverington (parish register). After private education at Moulton and The King's (The Cathedral) School, Reynolds became pensioner of Sidney Sussex College, Cambridge on 31 December 1689, and was elected foundation scholar in 1690. He left Sidney Sussex College to be admitted, on 12 November 1694, a fellow commoner of Trinity Hall, Cambridge, where he graduated LL.B. in 1695. He proceeded LL.D. from Sidney Sussex College in 1701.

Taking holy orders, and marrying Sarah, daughter of Richard Cumberland, Reynolds was instituted rector of St. Peter's, Northampton, and chancellor of the diocese of Peterborough. He was promoted to the deanery at the close of 1718, in succession to White Kennett. On 3 December 1721 he was consecrated bishop of Bangor at Lambeth chapel; he left a strongly Protestant and Hanoverian Charge at the Primary Visitation, begun at the Cathedral Church, Bangor, May 30, 1722. In 1723 he was translated to Lincoln, and held that bishopric for twenty years.

On 7 September 1727 he was elected a member of the Gentleman's Society at Spalding. He died in Charles Street, Westminster, on 15 January 1744, and was buried in Buckden church, Huntingdonshire.

== Notes ==
Attribution

This article incorporates text from a publication now in the public domain: Lee, Sidney, ed. (1896). "Reynolds, Richard (1674-1743)". Dictionary of National Biography. Vol. 48. London: Smith, Elder & Co.

Church of England titles
Preceded by Benjamin Hoadley	Bishop of Bangor; 1721–1723	Succeeded by William Baker
Preceded by Edmund Gibson	Bishop of Lincoln; 1723–1743	Succeeded by John Thomas
