= Thomas Bardwell =

English portrait and figure painter, art copyist, and writer (1704–1767)

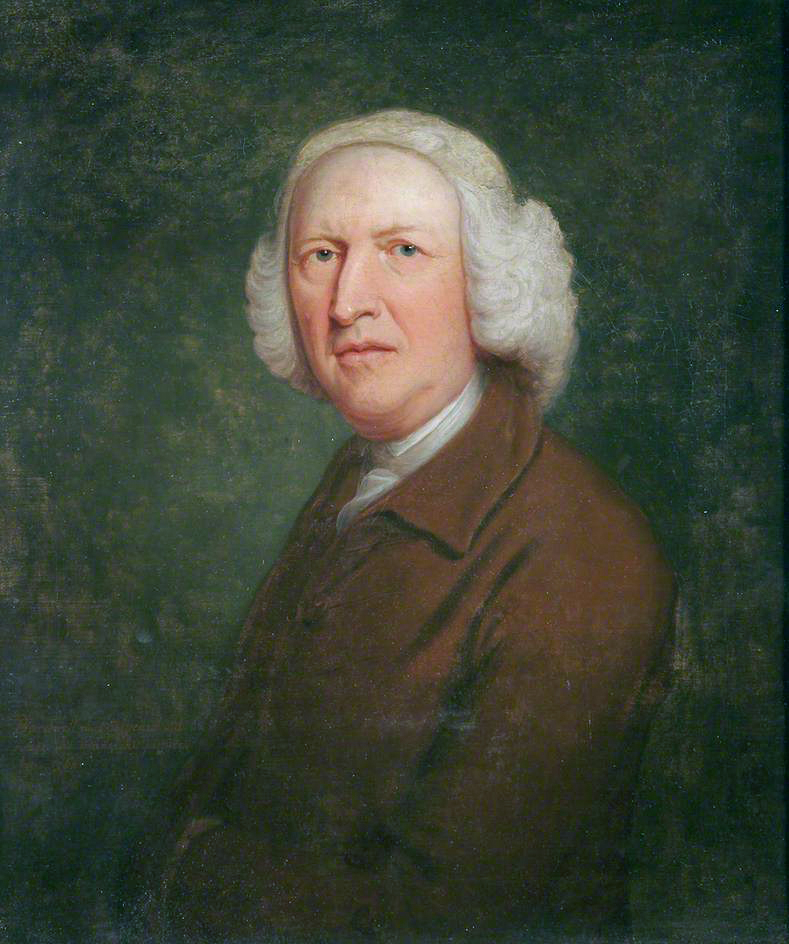
1765 self-portrait

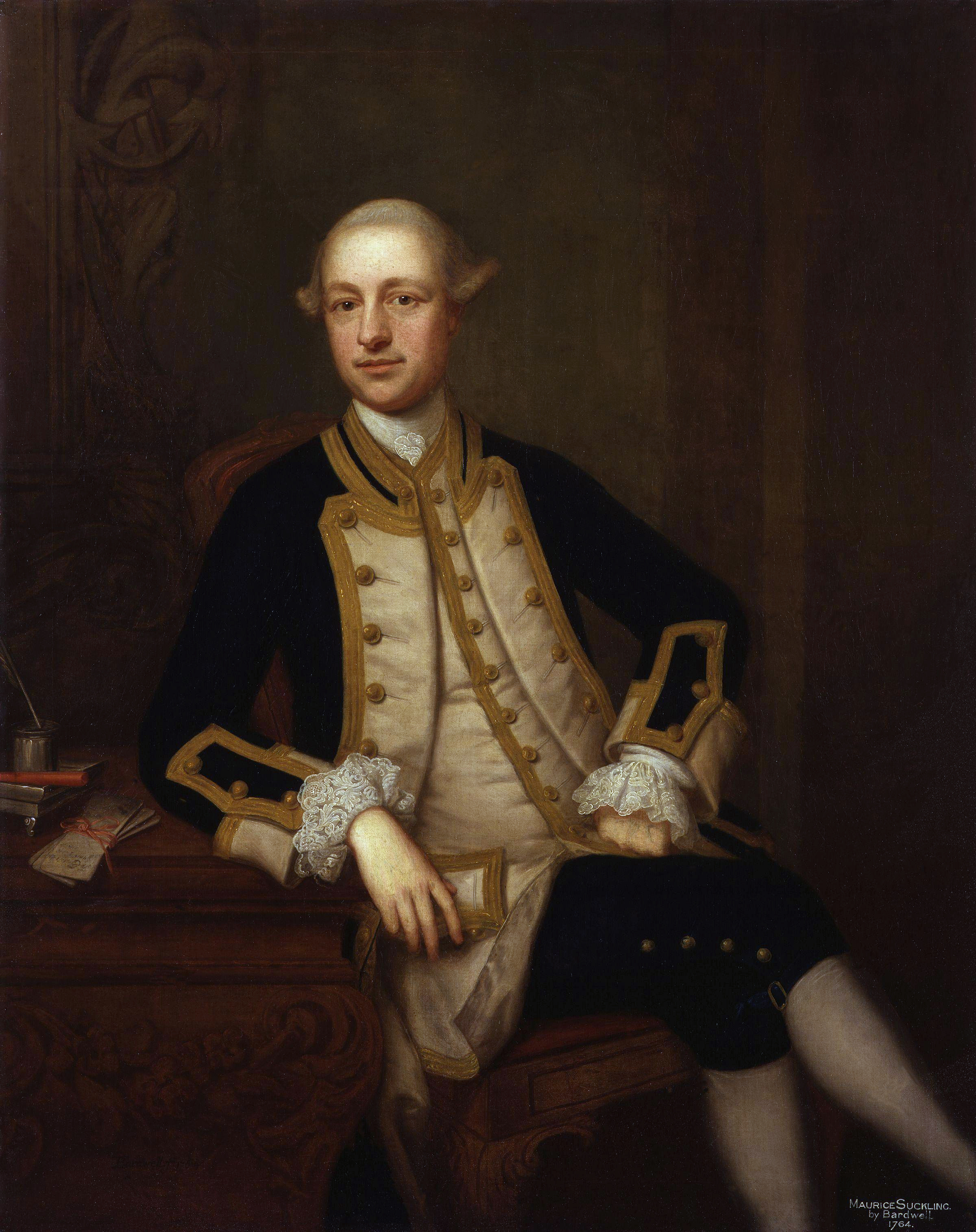
1764 portrait of Maurice Suckling by Bardwell

Thomas Bardwell (1704 – 9 September 1767) was an English portrait and figure painter, art copyist, and writer.

== Life and work ==
Bardwell initially earned his living initially as a painter of decorative panels for his family's business in Bungay, Suffolk.

His earliest known portraits are two conversation pieces dated 1736; one, possibly showing the Brewster family of Beccles, is in the collection of the Museum of the Home. In 1746 he was commissioned by the artillery company in Norwich to paint a portrait of William Crowe (who became mayor the following year), breaking the monopoly on civic portraiture in the city held until then by the German-born John Theodore Heins. It became the first of nine portraits by Bardwell that were to be hung in St Andrew's Hall in Norwich.

He painted several portraits in London during the 1740s and 1750s. One, Joshua Ward Receiving Money from Britannia (and Bestowing it as Charity on the Needy) (1748) is an allegorical work, showing Ward, a London doctor, with symbolic figures of Britannia and Charity and a crowd of patients. Now in the collection of the Royal College of Surgeons, it once hung in the Ward's parlour in Whitehall. There is an engraving after it, of 1748-9, probably by Bernard Baron.

In 1752-3 Bardwell carried out a large number of commissions in Yorkshire and Scotland. Eventually, in 1759, he settled permanently in Norwich. An obituary in a Norwich newspaper was to describe him as "an eminent portrait painter of this city, who principally through the power of genius and dint of application, acquired a degree of perfection in his art, which would have been deemed excellent, even had it been accompanied with a liberal tuition." According to A General History of the County of Norfolk, published in 1829, "the best of his portraits are at Langley; Mr. Turner and Mr. Carr, both of [Norwich] have historical subjects by him."

== Writings ==
In 1756, a 64-page treatise by Bardwell, entitled The Practice of Painting and Perspective Made Easy, dedicated to the Earl of Rochford, was published, printed by Miller of Bungay. It gives a London address for Bardwell, being advertised as available from the author "at the Golden Lamp, in Rose Street, near the end of Covent Garden". Edward Edwards, writing in 1808, praised the book, despite his generally low opinion of Bardwell as an artist, saying that "the instructions contained in that short work, so far as they relate to the process of painting, are the best that have hitherto been published". He did however, find the part on perspective unsatisfactory. A second edition was published in 1773.
