= St Mary with St Richard, Northolt =

Coordinates: 51°32′38″N 0°22′8″W

St Mary the Virgin
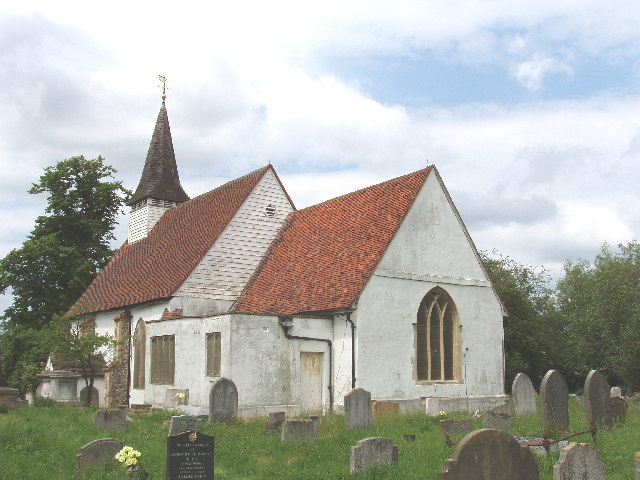
- St Mary the Virgin
- St Mary the Virgin
- Denomination: Church of England
- Website: www.northolt.org

History
- Dedication: Blessed Virgin Mary

Administration
- Province: Canterbury
- Diocese: London
- Archdeaconry: Northolt
- Deanery: Ealing (West)
- Parish: St Mary with St Richard

Clergy
- Rector: Rev. Julia Jagannath

St Mary the Virgin is a 13th-century Anglican parish church in Northolt, London Borough of Ealing. It is on a slope shared with Belvue Park, the site of a 15th-century manor house — both overlooked the old village of Northolt. It is one of London's smallest churches, its nave measuring 15 yards (14 m) by 8 yards (7.3 m). The church was built around 1290 and was expanded over the centuries, with the chancel being added in 1521, the spired bell tower in the 16th century, and a gallery at the west end of the church in 1703. Twin buttresses were erected against the west wall around 1718 to alleviate concerns that the church could slip down the hill. The internal beams are original and the bells date from the 17th century. The church was constructed from a variety of materials; the nave incorporates clunch (a type of limestone), flint and ironstone, and the mouldings of the doors and windows are made from Reigate Stone.

The church has been important ecclesiastically. From the 13th century to 1873 its rector was the Bishop of London, delegating the benefice (living, role as priest) to a vicar during that time. In the late 20th century it became the first Anglican parish to appoint a female rector, Rev. Pamela Walker.

It is one of two churches in the parish; the second, dedicated to St Richard, is large and modern. The churches share the same most senior cleric (rector) who conducts morning Sunday service at St Mary's Church, assists with the Sunday School, and then another service at 5pm at St Richard's Church.

== Building and contents ==
The small south porch was partly rebuilt in 1909, and a south vestry added in 1945. The nave dates substantially from the 14th century, but incorporates late-13th-century fragments. The chancel and nave roof were rebuilt in the early 16th century, and the square bell turret, which is weather-boarded and finished with a broach spire, dates from the same period. Buttresses, including the massive ones of brick at the west end, were added in the 18th century, and the church was among the majority "restored", i.e. considerably rebuilt in the 19th century. The octagonal stone font dates from the 14th century. The bowl is decorated with simple relief carving, and the wooden cover is dated 1624. There are four early 17th-century bells, the sanctus (tonic bell) cast in 1626. A wooden gallery of three bays, supported on Doric columns and said to have been constructed in 1703, is built across the west end of the nave. Other fittings include an 18th-century painting of the Adoration of the Magi on the north wall of the chancel, and a 17th-century carving of the Stuart arms, executed in painted wood, on the east wall of the nave. There are brasses with figures to Henry Rowdell (d. 1452) and Isaiah Bures (vicar 1596–1610). A 16th-century palimpsest brass commemorates the Gifford family. Wall tablets in the chancel and nave commemorate 18th and 19th century vicars and members of the Shadwell family.

The plate consists of a silver paten and cup dated 1702, and an electroplate dish of 1839. The registers record baptisms from 1560, marriages from 1575, and burials from 1583, transcribed to large databases.

== History ==
=== Styles of liturgy and modernisations ===
Little is written of the religious history before the 17th century. Some of the medieval and later vicars seem to have been pluralists (spread across parishes). In 1302 the vicar was included in a list of Middlesex incumbents excommunicated for nonpayment of the papal tenth. Staunchly Protestant moves imposed nationally during the rule of Oliver Cromwell saw some opposition. George Palmer (vicar 1638–43) was sequestered (bankrupted) in 1643 on the grounds that he spoke against Parliament, "enjoyed incestuous relations" with his sister-in-law, and had "deserted" his cure to join the "Royalist Army". Palmer seems to have enjoyed considerable popularity among the parishioners, who described his successor, Robert Malthus (vicar 1643–61), as "a factious preacher". The parishioners petitioned Cromwell for his removal, alleging that he was an unsatisfactory speaker, preached against the army in Scotland, and failed to observe national thanksgiving, Malthus retained the living until the Restoration. The years after 1661 are marked by laxity in the administration of the cure and in the maintenance of the church fabric. William Brabourne (vicar 1661–84) was frequently absent from the parish. During which the cure was served by a curate whose office is first mentioned in 1617. By 1664 parts of the church were falling into disrepair. There was no chalice, and the plate consisted of one silver cup and a pewter plate. The churchyard was unfenced, so that pigs entered. In 1685 it was ordered that adequate plate be provided and the churchyard be new-railed. The churchyard was still open to incursions by pigs and sheep in 1715, but the church was said to be in reasonable repair. Pews had recently been installed and a new gallery erected at the west end for the use of singers and servants. Several 18th-century vicars were absentees, relieved by the curate. Goronwy Owen, Welsh poet, served as curate from 1755 to 1758. During this period services were held twice on Sundays, and there were between 5 and 7 Communions a year. By 1790 the annual number of Communions had fallen to 4, and there were only 10 communicants. In 1965 evensong and Communion were celebrated daily, and there were four Sunday services.

=== Daughter parish and churches ===
Rapid increases in population during the 1930s and extensive council development after 1945 led to the formation of three daughter churches between 1940 and 1960, two sharing a southern new parish carved out of Northolt (St Joseph and St Hugh's).

- St Joseph the Worker for the southwest, West End, area, first met in 1942 in temporary premises off Watery Road demolished in 1944 to make way for houses, and the congregation continued to meet in a variety of buildings. In 1957 services were being held in Arundell School and in the church-house in Hawtrey Avenue. Then followed a brick-built dual-purpose hall behind the 'White Hart' in Ruislip Road, dedicated in 1959. In 1963 land in Yeading Lane had been purchased for the erection of a new church.
- in south-east Northolt from about 1948 occasional services were held in a builder's hut . A semipermanent hut at the junction of Kensington Road and Ruislip Road was dedicated in 1954 as the church of St Hugh, later rebuilt.
- In 1958 services began being held in a youth club hut on the Northolt Park housing estate in the north. The hut was burnt down in 1959, and the congregation then met in Vincent School. A dual-purpose hall-church in Haydock Avenue was consecrated in 1960 as the church of St Richard.

=== Appointments and assets ===
A priest is recorded at Northolt in 1086. A church is mentioned c. 1140. The oldest parts of the present building are consistent with the 13th century. The church served the whole of the parish until 1954 when the new parish of St. Barnabas was formed from a north-east area and part of the Greenford parish of Holy Cross.

The church formed part of the endowment of Walden Abbey (priory), founded by Geoffrey de Mandeville about 1140. The abbey continued to exercise its rights to it until some time between 1241 and 1251 when the prior's claims were disputed by St. Paul's Cathedral. The matter was referred to Peter de Newport, Archdeacon of London, and it was agreed that a vicarage should be instituted and the patronage vested in the Bishop of London and his successors. The vicars were to pay 12 marks annually towards the maintenance of St. Paul's Cathedral whose Dean and Chapter were to present (appoint the vicar and any other clerics) during vacancies of the London see (any times of no bishop). About 1247 there was said to be no vicarage, and the exact date of its ordination is unknown. According to an early-15th-century source the vicarage was ordained in 1388, but since the first recorded vicars date from the late 13th century, the document referred to is almost certainly the confirmation of an earlier ordinance. The Bishop continued to exercise the patronage until 1864, in which year it was transferred to Brasenose College, Oxford. The college holds the right to appoint the rector, the advowson.

The benefice of Northolt was valued at 12 marks in the mid 13th century. The Abbot of Walden received two marks from the profits of the benefice, and the Prior of Hurley in Berkshire half a mark. In 1291 the church was valued at £5; the Prior of Hurley still received his annual pension, and no payment to Walden is recorded. Presumably the vicar then enjoyed the rectorial estate. An agreement made in 1518 between the Bishop of London and the Vicar confirmed the latter's right to great and small tithes in consideration of £4 annually to this bishop. In 1535 Henry VIII through Thomas Cromwell saw all livings' annual value noted, in a compilation named the King's Books, finding it worth £15. Twelve years later the 'parsonage' was worth £26 and the vicar held (farmed out) 31 acres in the common fields. There were then no charities, obits (obituary legacies), or lights (stained glass), and the vicar furnished the cure himself. By 1610 the vicarage was a house with two barns, stable, orchard, garden, three closes of meadow containing 20 acres, lands in the Northolt common fields, and houses and land in Greenford parish. In 1650 general assets stood at 48 acres of glebe, the great and small tithes were valued together at £170, the total of these being £205. During the early 18th century the amount of glebe remained fairly constant, about 50 acres; income from tithes and glebe about £250. Under the 1835 inclosure award two modest closes: Hedges Meadow and Catherine Mead to the south and east of the house were allotted to the vicar in lieu of common field land, and glebe fell to 44 a. After the Greenford inclosure award of 1816 the Vicar of Northolt's right to tithes payable on old common-field land in Greenford parish was disputed by the Rector of Greenford. In 1841 the Greenford tithes were commuted by the population, the whole of the resultant rentcharge was apportioned to the Rector of Greenford, and the tithes payable to Northolt extinguished. The Northolt tithes were redeemed for £682 the next year. The net value of the living in 1835 was £539. Most of the glebe was sold for building after 1920.

A vicarage house is first mentioned in 1610. In 1692 the old house, wherever it may have been, was demolished by Charles Alston whose new vicarage built on a site off Ealing Road, by 1715 as a brick-built house with seven principal rooms, kitchen, dairy, cellars, outbuildings, and walled garden. Minor additions to the house were made during the 19th century, but after 1900 it fell into disrepair. The house was demolished in 1928. In 1963 the vicar was living in a semi-detached house in Church Road.

=== Priests ===
- 1523–1533 Peter Wilberforce
- 1571–1575 Robert Tower
- 1576–1592† John Maplet
- 1610–1611† Gabriel Powell
- 1611–1632 William Piers (as Dean then Bishop of Peterborough, later Bishop of Bath & Wells)
- 1638–1643 George Palmer (sequestered 1643)
- 1643–1658 Robert Malthus (appointed by the Westminster Assembly; great-great-grandfather of T. R. Malthus)
- 1661–1684/5† William Brabourne (as Canon of St Paul's and Hereford)
- 1685–1714† Charles Alston (as Archdeacon of Essex)
- 1714–1729† John Cockburn
- 1729–1749† Samuel Lisle (as Bishop of St Asaph then Norwich)
- 1749–1763† Samuel Nicolls (also Master of Temple Church and Rector of St James's Church, Piccadilly)
- 1763–1779 John Hotham (as Archdeacon of Middlesex; later Baronet, and Bishop of Ossory then Clogher)
- 1779–1806† Stephen Eaton (as Archdeacon of Middlesex)
- 1806–1822 Joseph Pott (later Archdeacon of London)
- 1822–1835 John Honywood Randolph (son of Bishop John Randolph)
- 1835–1837 William Greenlaw
- 1837–1852† Edward Murray (son of Bishop Lord George Murray)
- 1852–1855 William Gilson Humphry
- 1855–1859 George John Thomas
- 1860–1880 Hon. Douglas Hamilton-Gordon (son of Prime Minister the Earl of Aberdeen)
- 1880–1906 George Edmundson (historian)
- 1906–1917 Lancelot Charles Walford
- 1926–1933† John Alexander Williams
- fl. 1936 George Sydenham Holmes (organist)
- 1940–1955 Gordon Phillips (later Dean of Llandaff)
- 1994– Pamela Walker
- –2014 Greville Thomas
- fl. 2017 Chris Hill
- 2022– Julia Jagannath

† Rector died in post
