= James Halman =

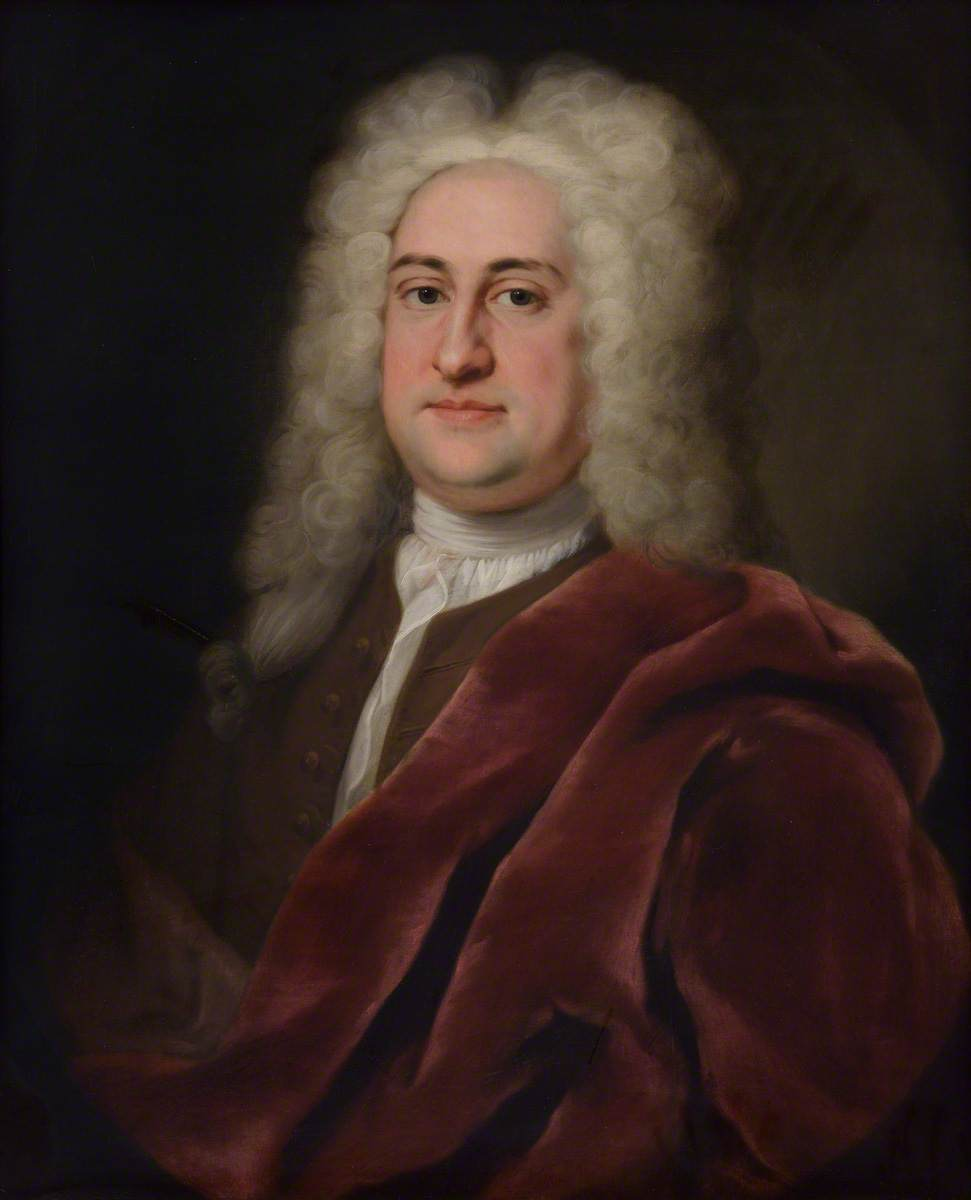
James Halman

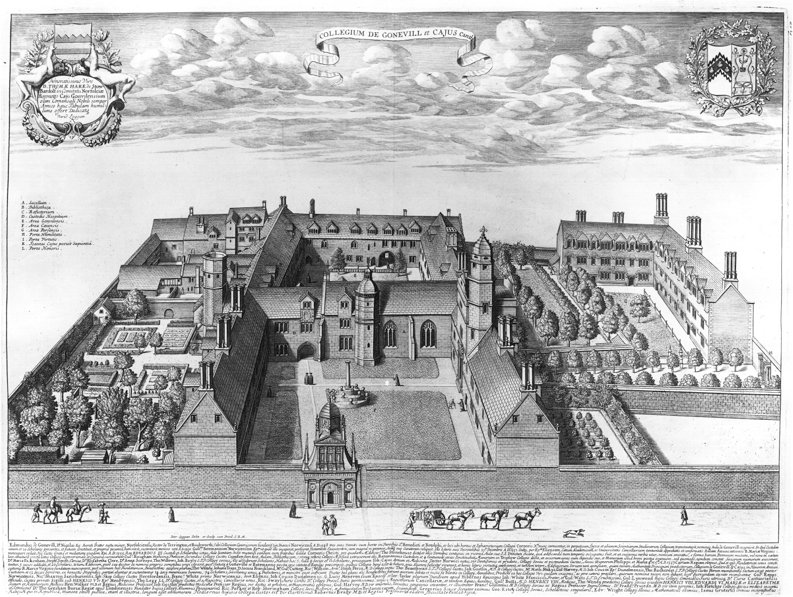
Gonville and Caius College, Cambridge, in 1690

James Halman (c. 1639 – 23 December 1702) was an academic of the University of Cambridge. He held the office of Registrary of the university from 1683 to 1701 and was also the twenty-third Master of Gonville and Caius College.

His surname was sometimes also spelt Holman.

== Early life ==
Halman was the son of Nicholas Halman, a Church of England clergyman and Rector of Thursford in Norfolk. He was educated at Holt School before being admitted to Gonville and Caius College as a sizar on 27 June 1655 and being at once elected as a scholar of the college. He graduated Bachelor of Arts in 1658 and proceeded to MA in 1662.

== Life ==
On 2 July 1662 Halman was elected a junior fellow of his college. Unusually for a Cambridge don of the period, he seems never to have taken holy orders, and in 1669 he failed to respond in Theology, pleading an attack of smallpox. Despite this, on 9 March 1671 he was elected as a senior fellow of the college, in which he lived continuously for some forty years, becoming Lecturer, Dean, Bursar, and finally Master. Beyond the confines of the college, in November 1683 he was elected as Registrary of the University, a significant office which he continued to hold until 1701, a year before his death, having been supported in the election to the post by Isaac Newton. Finally elected as Master of Caius on 24 October 1700, Halman was the twenty-third to hold the office, but presided over his college for barely two years.

In 1696 Richard Bentley was given the power to establish a "new-style" Cambridge University Press, and in July 1697 Halman made a loan of one hundred pounds to "the Chancellor Masters and Schollars of the University... towards the printing house and presse", subsequently receiving six per cent interest on it until the loan was repaid in full on 24 October 1702. At the same time the Duke of Somerset made the University a loan of £200 for the same purpose.

Halman was a friend of another fellow of Caius, Henry Jenkes, who died in 1697, and by a Will made in 1684 Jenkes left his library and all his other worldly goods to "my worthy friend, Mr James Halman", appointing him his sole executor and instructing him "to burn my papers, or else to publish them cum judicio et dilectu".

Halman died in Caius and on 23 December 1702 was entombed in the college chapel. In 1829 a portrait of him was reported to be still in the Master's Lodge, but in a history of the college published in the 1890s John Venn said of Halman as Master that "his brief career in that capacity has left no perceptible impression behind".

== Notes ==
Academic offices
Preceded by Robert Brady	Master of Gonville and Caius College, Cambridge; 1700–1702	Succeeded by John Ellys
