= Joseph Whately =

British priest

Joseph Whately or Whateley (1730–1797) was an English clergyman and Gresham Professor of Rhetoric.

== Life ==
He was the youngest brother of the politician Thomas Whately. He was vicar of Widford, Hertfordshire, from 1768 to 1790, and prebendary of Bristol Cathedral from 1793 to 1797. He was also a lecturer at Gresham College, where he was appointed Professor of Rhetoric in 1757.

Whately received the degree of D.C.L. from Oxford University on 9 July 1793, and died on 13 March 1797.

== Family ==
Whately married Jane, daughter of the Member of Parliament William Plumer. Their nine children included as the youngest Richard Whately, and five daughters. The youngest daughter died on 17 August 1866, widow of Sir David Barry. The third son changed his surname in 1805, and was known then as Joseph Thompson Halsey. The elder sons were William and Thomas; Thomas, a clergyman, married Isabella Sophia, daughter of Sir William Weller Pepys.
