= Abbey Grange Church of England Academy =

Secondary school in Leeds, West Yorkshire, England

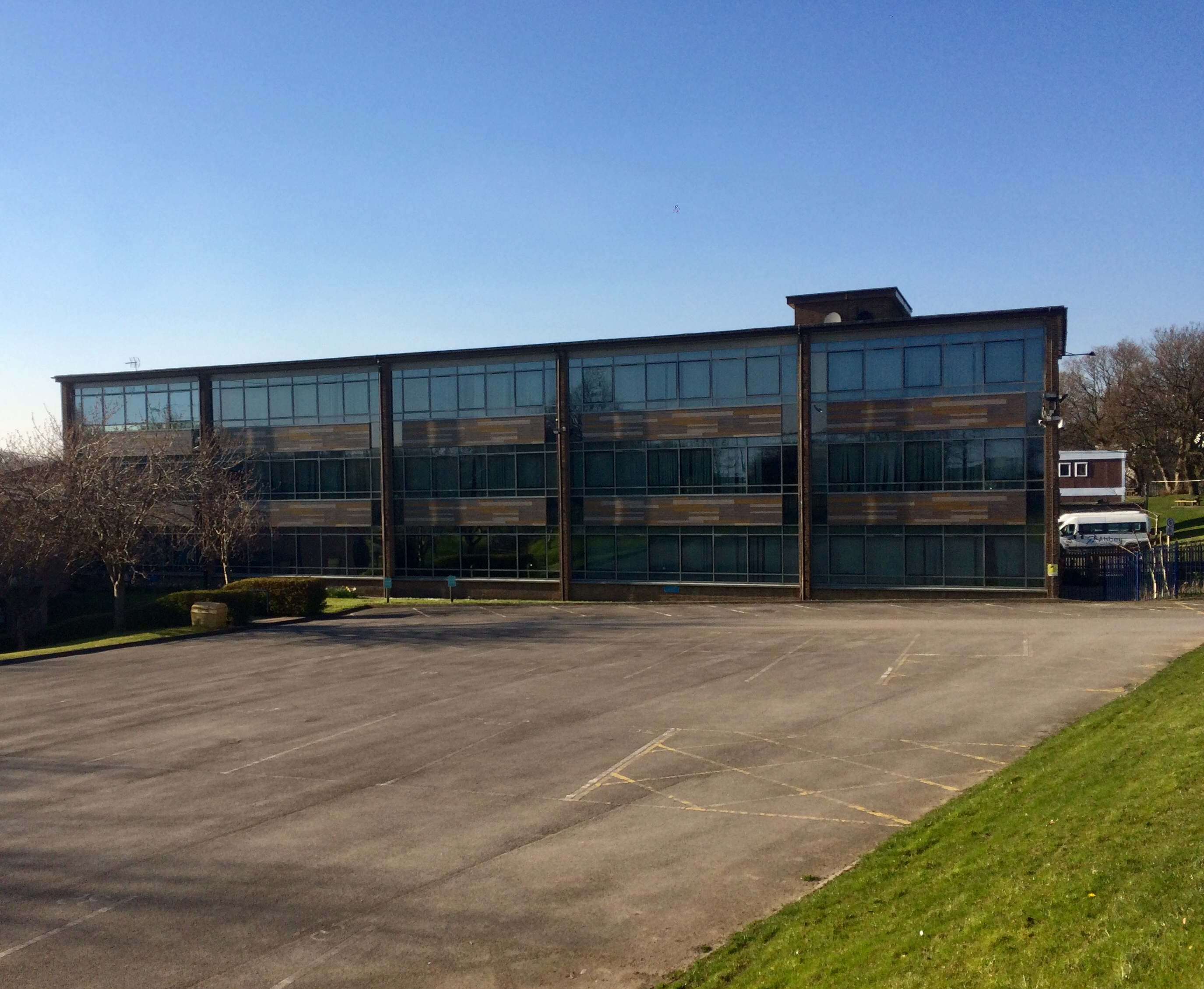

Location
- Butcher Hill; Leeds, West Yorkshire, LS16 5EA; England; 53.83395°N 1.60842°W

Information
- Type: Academy
- Motto: To educate, nurture and empower
- Religious affiliation: Church of England
- Department for Education URN: 137083 Tables
- Ofsted: Reports
- Executive Principal: Dawn Morgan
- Age: 11 to 18
- Colour: Navy Blue
- Website: Official website

Abbey Grange Church of England Academy is a coeducational secondary school and sixth form with academy status, located in West Park, Leeds, West Yorkshire, England. It is one of two Church of England secondary schools in Leeds, the other being Bishop Young CE Academy.

The school has 1,619 students as of November 2021 between the ages of 11 and 18, and 80 members of staff.

The school was awarded Humanities College status in 2006.

In August 2011 the school was changed into an academy and is now known as 'Abbey Grange Church of England Academy'.

The school was judged Good by Ofsted in 2017.

Abbey Grange alumni include footballer Andre Wisdom, actor and comedian Nick Mohammed, and academic and Shakespearean Emma Smith.
