= Thomas Whately =

English politician and writer (1726–1772)

Thomas Whately (1726 – 26 May 1772), an English politician and writer, was a Member of Parliament (1761–1768) who served as Commissioner on the Board of Trade, as Secretary to the Treasury under Lord Grenville, and as Under-secretary of State under Lord North (1771–1772). As an MP he published a letter on the reasonableness of the Stamp Act, 1765, which earned him a place in the events that led to the American Revolution.

He is probably best remembered for his Observations on Modern Gardening, illustrated by descriptions (London, 1770), the most important and successful contemporary book on the English Landscape Garden style, translated into German and French by the following year.

== Life ==
He was the eldest son of Thomas Whately of Epsom, Surrey and educated at Clare College, Cambridge (1745). He entered the Middle Temple in 1742 to study law and was called to the bar in 1751. He was an elder brother of the cleric Joseph Whately of Nonsuch Park, Surrey, and thus the uncle of Richard Whately. For many years he was in the close confidence of George Grenville, to whom he passed the political gossip. He also corresponded with Lord Temple, Lord George Sackville, and James Harris, M.P.

Whately sat in parliament from 1761 to 1768 for the borough of Ludgershall in Wiltshire, and from 1768 until his death he represented the borough of Castle Rising in Norfolk. From 5 April 1764 until its dismissal in July 1765 he held the post of secretary to the treasury in George Grenville's administration, before going into opposition.

On Grenville's death in November 1770, Whately attached himself to Lord North, and acted as the go-between for his old patron's friends. Junius denounced him as possessing "the talents of an attorney" and "the agility of Colonel Bodens" (who could scarcely move), and for deserting Grenville's cause. He was appointed a commissioner on the board of trade in January 1771, the keeper of his Majesty's private roads in January 1772, and under-secretary of state for the northern department in June 1771. These appointments he held for the rest of his life.

Whately died unmarried and intestate on 26 May 1772; his brother, William Whately, a banker in Lombard Street, London, administered to the effects.

== Political writings ==
Whately was the author of Remarks on "The Budget," or a Candid Examination of the Facts and Arguments in that Pamphlet (1765), rebutting David Hartley's attack on Grenville's financial schemes, and he also defended his chief in Considerations on the Trade and Finances of the Kingdom and on the Measures of the Administration since the Conclusion of the Peace (3rd edit. 1769).

Whately has sometimes been credited with the authorship of a pamphlet on the Present State of the Nation (1768; appendix, 1769), but it was drawn up, under Grenville's supervision, by William Knox. A second pamphlet, The Controversy between Great Britain and her Colonies reviewed (1769), attributed to him and included in John Almon's Collection of Tracts on Taxing the British Colonies in America (vol. iii. 1773), was also written by Knox.

== Observations on Modern Gardening ==
Among gardeners, Whately is largely remembered as the author of Observations on Modern Gardening, illustrated by descriptions (London, 1770), written while living in the Mansion House in Nonsuch Park. Close on the heels of George Mason's Essay on Design in Gardening, Whately's Observations provide the most comprehensive work on the theory and practice of English landscape gardening in the naturalistic taste before Horace Walpole's brief Essay on Modern Gardening (1782) and the writings of Humphry Repton. The picturesque landscape style in the manner of idealized landscapes by Salvator Rosa or Claude Lorrain, had been pioneered by Charles Bridgeman in the 1720s, improved by William Kent and eventually dominated by Lancelot "Capability" Brown, but neither had put their thoughts into print.

By 1783, Thomas Jefferson, the future third President of the United States, already had a copy of Whately's book in his library at Monticello. During his European years as Minister to France, he also visited England. Eager to explore and gain practical knowledge for his own garden designs, in April 1786, Jefferson set out for a tour of English gardens in the company of his close friend and future second President of the US, John Adams. Whately's treatise guiding him every step of the way, Jefferson's near contemporary statement attests to the accuracy and reliability of Whately's description:

Memorandums made on a tour to some of the gardens in England described by Whateley in his book on gardening. While his descriptions in point of style are models of perfect elegance and classical correctness, they are as remarkeable for their exactness. I always walked over the gardens with his book in my hand, examined with attention the particular spots he described, found them so justly characterised by him as to be easily recognised, and saw with wonder, that his fine imagination had never been able to seduce him from the truth.

Whately's work went through several editions. Translations in German and French appeared as early as 1771.

== Remarks on Some of the Characters in Shakespeare ==
Whately's Remarks on Some of the Characters in Shakespeare was left unfinished at his death and published posthumously by his brother, the Rev. Joseph Whately, in 1785. Whately's analysis of several of Shakespeare's principal characters applies to them the principles of psychology and motivation of Whately's own proto-Romantic sensibilities.

== Hutchinson letters affair ==
After Whately's death, correspondence directed to him from Thomas Hutchinson, governor of Massachusetts, Lieutenant-Governor Andrew Oliver, and other British colonial agents was leaked to Benjamin Franklin. They were later published in Boston, caused great scandal, and eventually involved his brother William Whately in a duel. "These letters, though not official, related wholly to public affairs, and were intended to affect public measures. They were filled with representations, in regard to the state of things in the colonies, as contrary to the truth, as they were insidious in their design. The discontents and commotions were ascribed to a factious spirit among the people, stirred up by a few intriguing leaders; and it was intimated, that this spirit would be subdued, and submission to the acts of Parliament would be attained, by the presence of a military force, and by persevering in the coercive measures already begun".

== Other notable facts ==
At the insistence of Hutchinson, then acting governor, the town of Whately, Massachusetts, was named for him when it was set apart from Hatfield in 1771.
