= Henry Jenkes =

Henry Jenkes (died 1697), was a Gresham Professor of Rhetoric.

Jenkes was descended from a Prussian family, was a native of England, and received his early education at King's College, Aberdeen, where he was admitted in 1642, and graduated M.A. in 1646. On 21 March 1646 he was admitted a member of Emmanuel College, Cambridge, and in 1649 he was incorporated M.A. in that university. He was elected a fellow of Caius College, Cambridge, in the time of the civil war. On the occasion of the opening of the Sheldonian Theatre he was incorporated M.A. at Oxford, 13 July 1669. He was elected professor of rhetoric in Gresham College, London, on 21 October 1670, in succession to Dr. William Croone. He was elected a fellow of the Royal Society on 30 November 1674. He resigned his professorship on 2 October 1676, after which he resided wholly at Cambridge, living by his fellowship at Caius College. Dying there at the end of August 1697, he was buried on 1 September in the church of St. Michael, in which parish the college is situated. He corresponded with several learned men in Holland.

By his Will dated 14 May 1684, Jenkes left his library and all his other worldly goods to his friend James Halman, another fellow of Caius, who was his sole executor.

== Works ==
- The Christian Tutor, or a Free and Rational Discourse of the Sovereign Good and Happiness of Man, London, 1683, 8vo.
- De Natura et Constitutione Ethicæ, præsertim Christianæ, ejusque Usu et Studio, prefixed to Stephani Curcellæi Synopsis ethices, London, 1684; Cambridge, 1702.
- The Christian Dial.
- Rationale Biblicum, manuscript left ready for the press at the time of his death.
