= John Ellys (Caius) =

English academic (d. 1716)

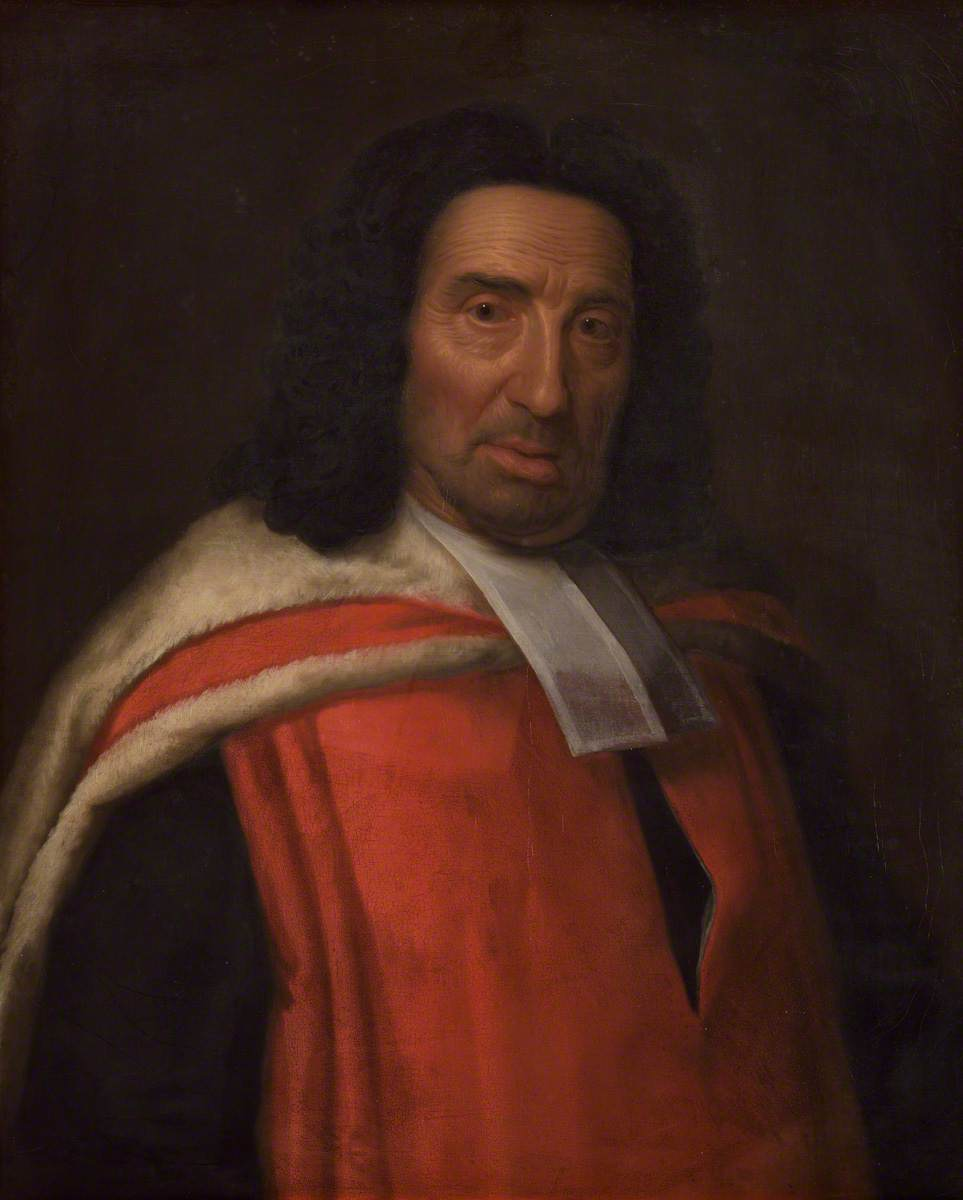
John Ellys

Sir John Ellys or Ellis (c. 1634 – 1716) was an English academic, Master of Gonville and Caius College, Cambridge from 1703.

== Early life ==
He was born at Huntingfield in Suffolk, into a well-known East Anglian family; the Ellyses of Great Yarmouth, his relations, are mentioned for example in the Journal of Rowland Davies, and Anthony Ellys was a great-nephew, son of Anthony Ellys who was mayor there. His father was John Ellis or Ellys, of Raveningham or Frostenden, with two brothers, Anthony and Thomas. The Perlustration of Great Yarmouth by Charles John Palmer gives his mother as Mary Barre of Syleham.

== Fellow and associate of Newton ==
After studying in a number of Suffolk schools, Ellys matriculated at Caius in 1648, aged 14. He graduated B.A. in 1652, and M.A. in 1655. He was then a Fellow of Caius from 1659 and in 1703 (N.S.) became Master, succeeding James Halman, who had died.

Ellys was a personal friend of Isaac Newton. He helped Newton with astronomical observations, and was one of the few who knew Newton at Cambridge who visited his rooms.

Ellys was also noted as a leading tutor across the university, popular and distinguished; and was not ordained, but held the degree of M.D. A tutorial pupil, Henry Wharton, was taught by Newton, and is thought to have been the only undergraduate student to have seen Newton's mathematical papers. Another tutorial pupil was Samuel Clarke, and Ellys had him translate the Traité of Jacques Rohault (from French to Latin, creating a textbook). It has been argued that Ellys was introducing his pupils to Newtonian thought by the 1690s. William Whiston also claimed credit for the Newtonian edge to Clarke's Rohault translation (which however went to several editions); and Richard Laughton was thought by W. W. Rouse Ball to have been another Newtonian influence on Clarke. Ellys, however, is now considered a more likely source.

After Thomas Plume died in 1704, Ellys, Newton and John Flamsteed were asked to set up the Plumian Chair. Ellys pushed for the initial appointment of Roger Cotes. He then had to pacify Flamsteed and another trustee over the arrangements made for Cotes in Trinity College.

Ellys was Vice-Chancellor of the university at the time of Queen Anne's visit in 1705, and was knighted by her with Newton and James Montagu. These honours were intended to help the Whig political cause, and were engineered by Charles Montagu, 1st Earl of Halifax, brother of James Montagu. Ellys, however, is considered non-political. Apart from his interest in the new Cartesian and Newtonian scientific advances, there is little to indicate Ellys's views: it has been suggested that he was a Tory, and not concerned with Newton's theology. He took no part in the poll in the general election of 1710.

When Whiston was deprived of the Lucasian Chair, Ellys lined up with Richard Bentley in trying to make Christopher Hussey his successor in 1711. Newton remained above the fray, and the outsider Nicholas Saunderson was narrowly elected.

== Later life ==
As Master of Caius Ellys tried, from 1709, to exercise a veto in college business, causing the Visitor to intervene in 1714. His ongoing conflicts in old age with the Fellows earned him the nickname "Devil of Caius". He was quite isolated, his only ally in the college being his nephew John Ellys.

Ellys was buried in the Church of St Cyriac and St Julitta, Swaffham Prior. A memorial inscription recorded by Francis Blomefield states he was in his 86th year. He had contributed for the purchase of the rectory of Broadwey in Dorset for the college in his lifetime, but left nothing further in his will. His successor Thomas Gooch was a former tutorial pupil of his.

Academic offices
Preceded by James Halman	Master of Gonville and Caius College, Cambridge; 1703–1716	Succeeded by Thomas Gooch
