= Edward Smyth (bishop) =

Irish Protestant churchman

Edward Smyth or Smith (1665–1720) was an Irish Protestant churchman, the bishop of Down and Connor from 1699.

== Life ==
Born at Lisburn in County Antrim in 1665, he was the son of James Smyth of Mountown, County Down, by his wife Francisca, daughter of Edward Dowdall of Mountown. He was elected a Scholar of Trinity College Dublin in 1678, and graduated B.A. in 1681. In 1684 he proceeded M.A. and was elected a fellow. He later obtained the degrees of LL.B. in 1687, B.D. in 1694, and D.D. in 1696. In 1689, when Dublin was in the possession of James II, he fled to England, where he was recommended to the Smyrna Company, and made chaplain to the factory at Smyrna.

Smyth returned to England in 1693 with a fortune, and was appointed chaplain to William III, whom he attended for four years during the war in the Low Countries. On 3 March 1696, he was made dean of St Patrick's Cathedral, Dublin. In 1697 he became Vice-Chancellor of the University of Dublin, and on 2 April 1699 he was consecrated bishop of Down and Connor. In 1701 he was made a member of the Privy Council of Ireland.

Smyth died at Bath, Somerset on 4 November 1720. He was elected a Fellow of the Royal Society in 1695. He was also a member of the Philosophical Society of Dublin.

== Works ==
Smyth was the author of sermons, and contributed papers to the Philosophical Transactions of the Royal Society, mainly relating to the customs of the Levant.

== Family ==
Smyth was twice married. By his first wife whom he married circa 15 February 1696, his cousin Elizabeth, daughter of William Smyth, Bishop of Kilmore, he had Elizabeth, who married James Stopford, 1st Earl of Courtown. By his second wife Mary whom he married circa 19 April 1710, daughter of Clotworthy Skeffington, 3rd Viscount Massereene, he had two sons, Skeffington Randal and James.

== Notes ==
Attribution

This article incorporates text from a publication now in the public domain: Lee, Sidney, ed. (1898). "Smith, Edward (1665-1720)". Dictionary of National Biography. Vol. 53. London: Smith, Elder & Co.
