= William Baker (bishop of Norwich) =

English churchman and academic

The Right Reverend William Baker
- Bishop of Norwich
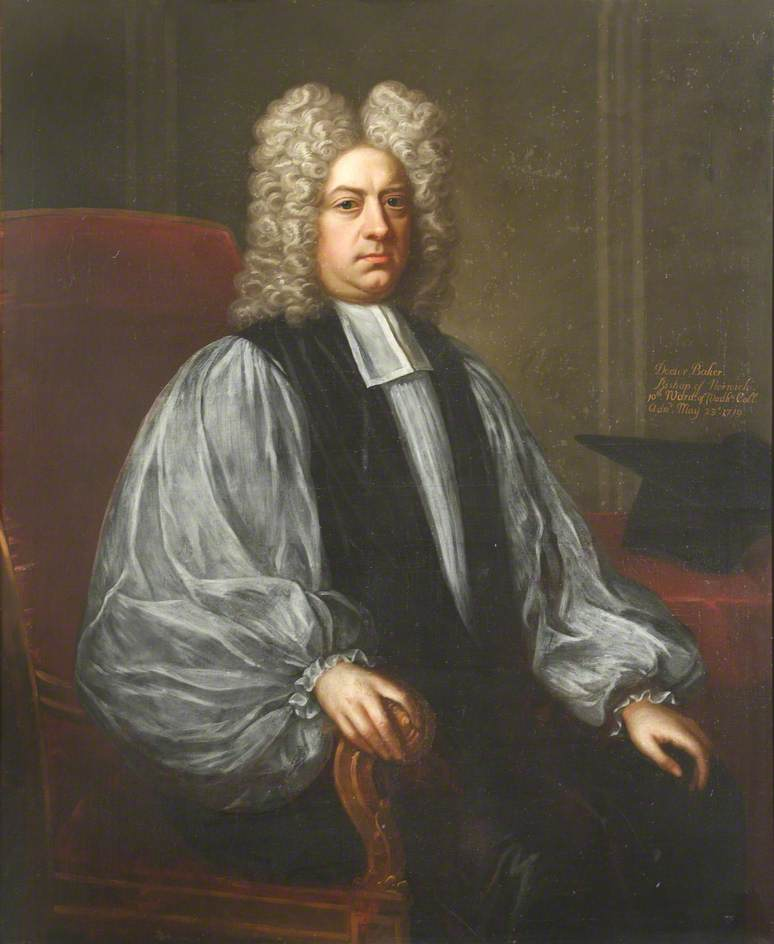
- Diocese: Diocese of Norwich
- In office: 1727–1732
- Predecessor: John Leng
- Successor: Robert Butts
- Other post: Bishop of Bangor (1723–1727)

Orders
- Consecration: 11 August 1723 by William Wake

Personal details
- Born: 1668 Ilton, Somerset
- Died: 4 December 1732 (aged 64) Bath, Somerset
- Buried: Bath Abbey
- Denomination: Anglican
- Education: Crewkerne Grammar School; Wadham College, Oxford

William Baker (1668 – 4 December 1732) was an English churchman and academic, Warden of Wadham College, Oxford, Bishop of Bangor and bishop of Norwich.

== Life ==
He was the son of William Baker, vicar of Ilton, Somerset, where he was born. He was educated at Crewkerne School, and entered Wadham College, Oxford, where he was first fellow, and eventually became warden in 1719. He was successively rector of St. Ebbes, of Padworth, and of Blaydon, all in the diocese of Oxford. In 1714 he was collated to the archdeaconry of Oxford.

He was chaplain in ordinary to George I. In 1723 he was promoted to the see of Bangor, from which in 1727 he was translated to Norwich. He held the rectory of St. Giles-in-the-Fields in commendam up to the time of his death, which occurred at Bath, 4 December 1732. He never married. During his brief tenure of the see of Bangor he made his only brother treasurer of the church there, and his two nephews were provided for by being made registrars of the diocese of Norwich. Francis Blomefield, the historian of Norfolk, who was ordained by him, gives the titles of four sermons which he printed; one of them was published by special command of Queen Anne in 1710.

Academic offices
Preceded by Thomas Dunster	Warden of Wadham College, Oxford; 1719–1723	Succeeded by Robert Thistlethwayt
Church of England titles
Preceded by Richard Reynolds	Bishop of Bangor; 1723–1727	Succeeded by Thomas Sherlock
Preceded by John Leng	Bishop of Norwich; 1727–1732	Succeeded by Robert Butts
