= Belinda Jack =

Academic working on rhetoric and French literature

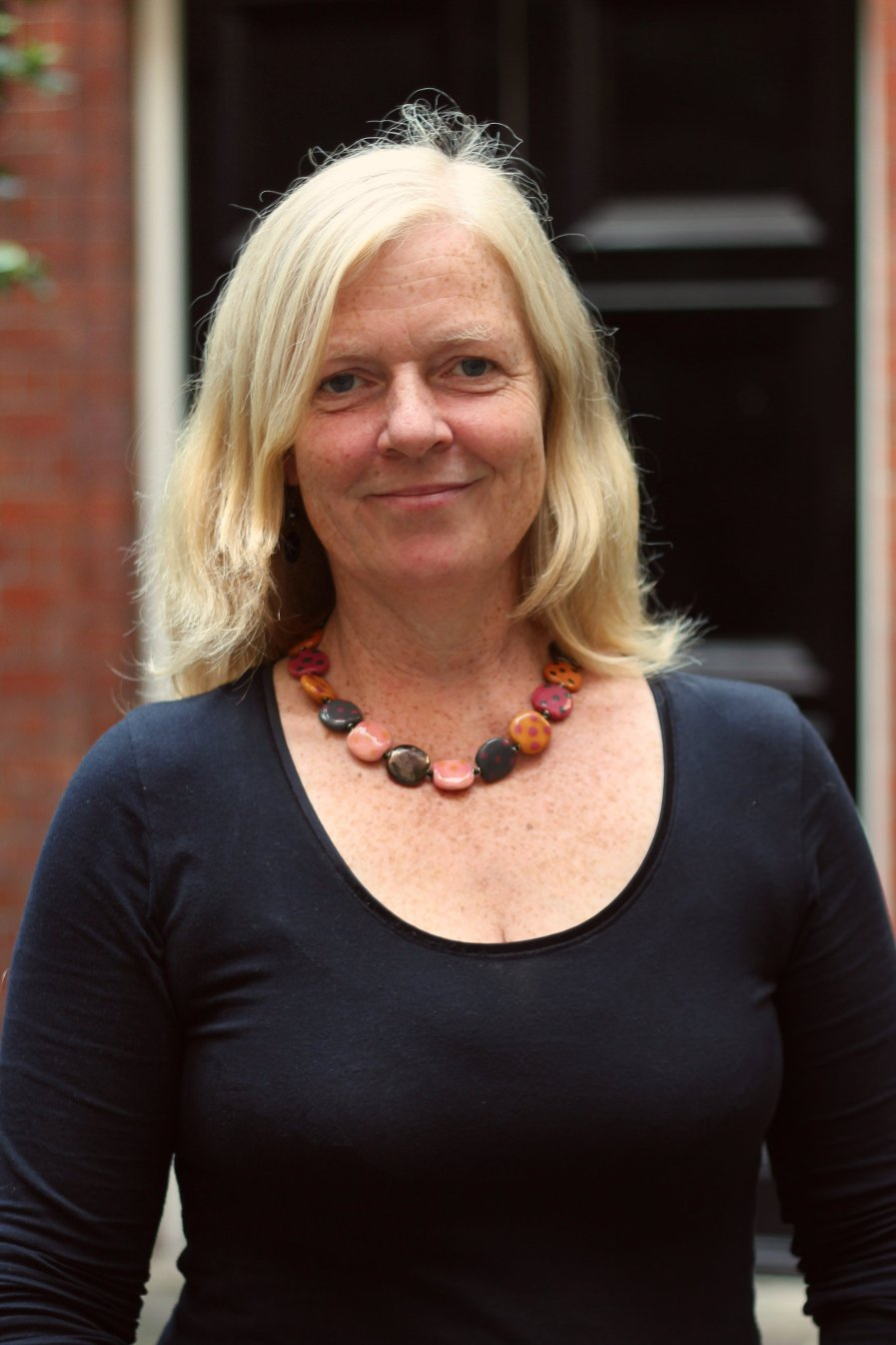
- Education: University of Kent (BA); St John's College, Oxford (DPhil)
- Scientific career
- Fields: French Literature; Literary theory Medieval French literature Francophone literature 19th-century French literature 20th-century French literature
- Workplaces: Christ Church, Oxford; Gresham College; Faculty of Medieval and Modern Languages, University of Oxford

Belinda Jack is Fellow and Tutor in French literature and Language at Christ Church, Oxford at the University of Oxford, Professor of Rhetoric at Gresham College and the author of books such as The Woman Reader and George Sand: A Woman's Life Writ Large.

== Education and career ==
After a period living in Paris and studying at the Sorbonne, Belinda Jack was awarded a bachelor's degree in French with African and Caribbean Studies from the University of Kent. She then obtained her Doctor of Philosophy (D.Phil) in Négritude and Literary Criticism at St John's College, Oxford at the University of Oxford in 1989.

After completing her doctorate, Jack stayed on at the University of Oxford where she worked as a lecturer at a number of different colleges before being awarded a fellowship at Christ Church, Oxford. She continues to tutor at Christ Church, in French Literature and Language. Jack is an 'Official Student' at Christ Church, Oxford making her a Fellow and a Member of the Governing Body at the college. Jack teaches an Advanced Translation course at the Faculty of Medieval and Modern Languages, University of Oxford., and she is currently Director of the University of Oxford Undergraduate studies for Modern Languages.

In 2013, Jack was appointed as the 47th Professor of Rhetoric at Gresham College, following Richard J. Evans. In this role she delivers a series of free public lectures within the City of London. Her first series was on The Mysteries of Reading, and this was followed by The Mysteries of Writing Novels and Poems.

In September 2023 Jack was awarded a Title of Distinction of Professor of French and Literary Studies by the University of Oxford.

== Other research work and publications ==
Her books include:

- Negritude and Literary Criticism: The History and Theory of 'Negro-African' Literature in French (Greenwood Press, 1996)
- Francophone Literatures: An Introductory Survey (Oxford: OUP, 1996).
- George Sand: A Woman's Life Writ Large (Chatto and Windus, 1999)
- Beatrice's Spell: The Enduring Legend of Beatrice Cenci (Chatto and Windus, 2003)
- The Woman Reader (Yale, 2012)
- Reading: A Very Short Introduction (OUP, 2019), translations in Japanese, Chinese and Turkish

Jack co-authored Epreuve avant la lettre: George Sand et l'autobiographie renversee (Literature, 134 (2004), 121–130) which is written in French.

As well as books and academic publications, Jack has published articles, essays, chapters and reviews. These have appeared in The Wall Street Journal, Literary Review, The Times Literary Supplement, Times Higher Education and BBC History. She has appeared on BBC Radio and television, as well as at literary festivals across the UK.

== Reception ==
Of The Woman Reader, Judith Flanders in The Sunday Telegraph wrote "A rarefied study of women's reading over the centuries – a subject that is vast, but also intensely private, and that has left little trace for most of history". Lesley McDowell for The Independent wrote "Jack's excellent history begins from a position of anxiety, which she argues is caused by women's access to the written word. What do women read and that happens to them, and the world, when they do?" Hermione Lee, in The Guardian, said that the book "repeatedly tells [a story of] of the way that the woman reader has persisted and thrived under all kinds of conditions", and described it as a "thorough and informative book".
