= John Theodore Heins =

English painter and engraver (c. 1697–1756)

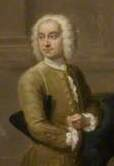
- self-portrait from the painting A Music Party at Melton Constable (1734)
- Born: c. 1697; Germany
- Died: 1756; Norwich
- Occupation: Painter
- Children: John Heins

John Theodore Heins (c. 1697 – 1756) was a painter and engraver, probably of German birth, but active in Great Britain. He settled in Norwich and by 1720 was working on a series of portraits of members of prominent local families.

== Life ==
Heins was working in Norwich from around 1720. He is recorded as living in Hog Hill in the city in 1729 when he held a raffle, with three of his pictures as prizes. Some of his early works are signed "D. Heins"; the "D" is thought to stand for "Dietrich", the German form of "Theodore".

In 1732, he was commissioned to execute the first of a number of portraits of Norwich civic dignitaries which can now be seen at Saint Andrew's Hall in the city. He monopolised civic portraiture in Norwich until 1746, when Thomas Bardwell was commissioned by the city's artillery company to paint a portrait of William Crowe, who became mayor the following year. Heins painted two portraits of the Hanoverian composer and emigre to England, Handel. Some of his finest works were commissioned by the Astley family of Melton Constable, including one of a Musical Party, and a double portrait of Edward and Blanche Astley, the children of Sir Jacob Astley, 3rd Bt. (1692 – 1760). Heins also depicted allegorical and historical subjects and candle-light scenes, and painted genre pieces, including two Scenes from the Life of Thomas Guy.

In October 1745, the Gentleman's Magazine published a poem called "Lines on seeing some portraits of the celebrated Mr. Heyns of Norwich".

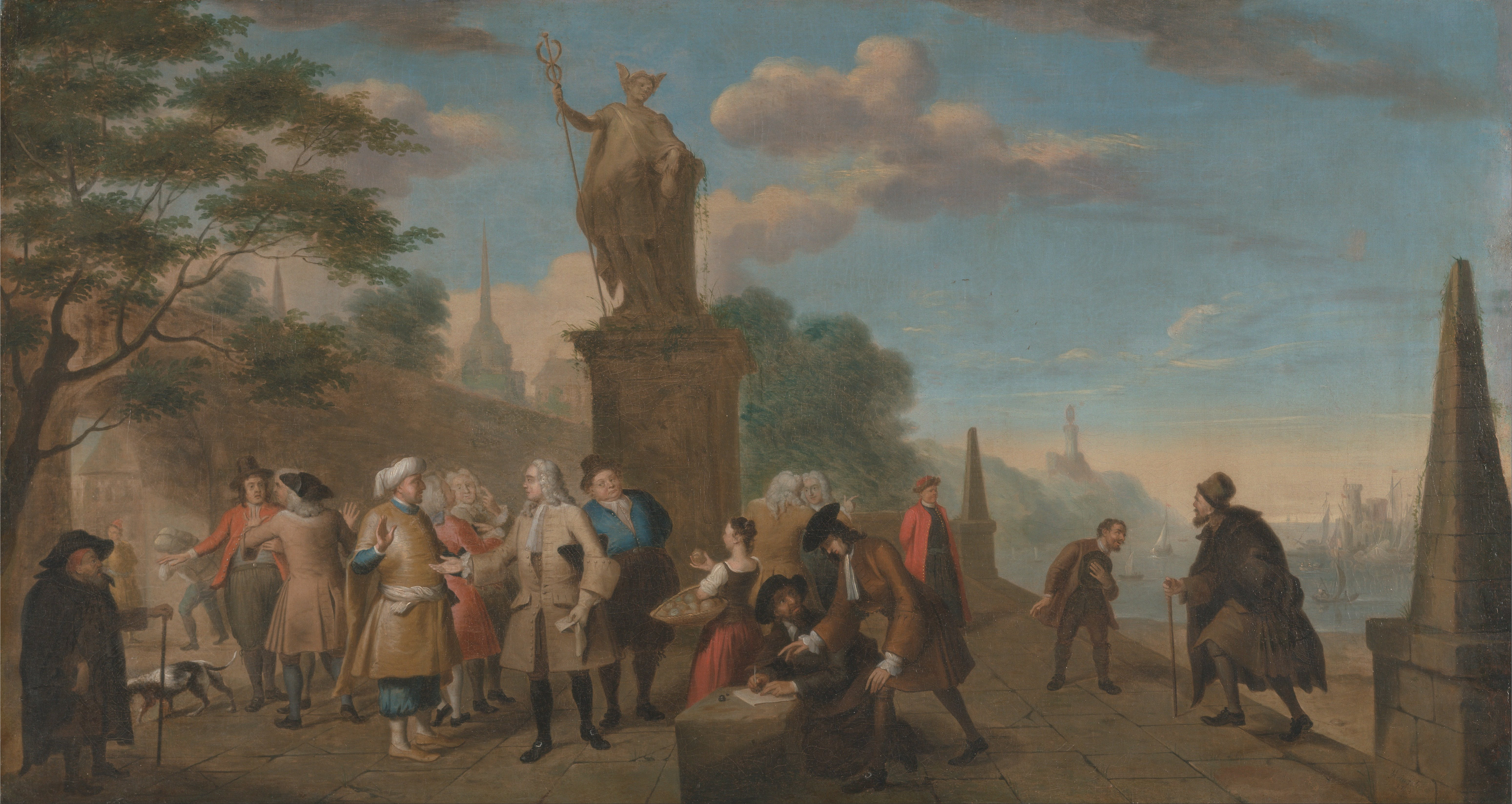
Heins' Allegory of Trade (Yale Center for British Art)

== Prints ==
Joseph Strutt, in his Biographical Dictionary of Engravers (1786), notes that Heins reproduced some of his portraits in mezzotint in what he calls "a very stiff tasteless style", and that he was also said to have etched a few plates. The one print by Heins that Strutt mentions specifically is a half-length portrait of Thomas Gooch, Bishop of Norwich, signed Heins Pinx et fecit, 1741.

== John Theodore Heins junior ==
Strutt says that Heins's son, whom he names only as "J. Heins" was originally apprenticed to a cloth manufacturer, but then, against his parents' wishes, became an artist, painting both oil paintings and miniatures. To Strutt, however, "his chief excellence lay in etching or, rather, scratching, for it was done without the assistance of aquafortis, with the drypoint." He drew the plates for James Bentham's History of Ely. His portraits included a pair of a Mr. Grosse and his wife; Grosse's brother gave Strutt the details of the Heins family which he used in his Biographical Dictionary. John Theodore Heins Junior died in Chelsea in around 1770.

== Sources ==
- Oxford Grove Art The Concise Grove Dictionary of Art. Oxford University Press.
