= List of chaplains of the Levant Company =

The Levant Company, an English chartered company formed in 1581, employed chaplains in some cities of the Eastern Mediterranean.

Source: List of British Consular Officials in Turkey (1581-1860) (PDF).

== Chaplains at Aleppo ==
- 1597-1600 ? Maye
- 1600–1608 William Biddulph
- 1624–1630 Charles Robson
- 1630–1635 Edward Pococke
- 1636 -? Thomas Pritchett
- 1641–1645 Bartholemew Chapple
- 1650-1654 Nathaniel Hill
- 1655–1670 Robert Frampton
- 1671–1681 Robert Huntington
- 1681-1687 John Guise
- 1688–1694 William Hallifax
- 1695–1701 Henry Maundrell
- 1701-1703 Henry Brydges
- 1703-1706 Harrington Yarborough
- 1706–1716 Thomas Owen
- 1716–1719 Samuel Lisle
- 1719-? Joseph Soley
- 1729–1742 Edward Edwards
- 1743-1748 John Hemming
- 1750-1753 Thomas Crofts
- 1756-1758 Charles Holloway
- 1758–1769 Thomas Dawes
- 1769–1770 Eleazar Edwards
- 1770–1778 Robert Foster
- 1779 John Hussey
- 1783 Post abolished

== Chaplains at Constantinople ==
- c.1611–1614 William Ford
- To 1618 Thomas King
- 1637–1640 Edward Pococke
- 1663–1664 Denham, probably Benjamin Denham
- 1664-1668 Henry Denton
- 1668–1670 Thomas Smith
- 1670–1677 John Covel
- c.1700 Jean Armand Dubourdieu
- 1718, 1725 and 1733-1736 Thomas Payne
- c.1765–1775 Sidney Swinney
- Charles Nicholson
- 1794 James Dallaway
- 1799 Philip Hunt
- 1802–1804 George Cecil Renouard
- c.1816 Henry Lindsay
- 1817–1822 Jacob George Wrench
- 1820–c.1828 and 1831–c.1835 Robert Walsh

== Chaplains at Smyrna ==
- 1635, arrived 1636 Thomas Curtis
- 1652 Eleazar Duncon
- 1653 Thomas Browne
- To c.1654 Hales
- 1654, arrived 1655 Robert Winchester
- 1661 Clarke
- 1663–1664 John Broadgate
- 1664–1669 John Luke
- 1670–1673 Philip Traherne
- 1673–1683 John Luke again
- 1689–1693 Edward Smyth
- 1698–1702 Edmund Chishull
- 1702–1710 John Tisser
- 1710–1716 Samuel Lisle
- 1759 Philip Brown
- 1789-1807 John Frederick Usko
- 1811–1814 George Cecil Renouard
- 1817–1820 Charles Williamson
- 1822–c.1836 Francis Vyvyan Jago Arundell
- 1840 onwards William Bucknor Lewis

== Other ==
- 1720–1732 Thomas Shaw at Algiers
