= Edmund Chishull =

Edmund Chishull (1671–1733) was an English clergyman and antiquary.

== Life ==
He was son of Paul Chishull, and was born at Eyworth, Bedfordshire, 22 March 1670–1. He was a scholar of Corpus Christi College, Oxford in 1687, where he graduated B.A. in 1690, M.A. in 1693, and became a Fellow in 1696.

He was appointed chaplain to the factory of the Turkey Company at Smyrna. Sailing from England in the frigate Neptune on 10 February 1698, he arrived at Smyrna on 12 November 1698. While resident there he made a tour to Ephesus, setting out on 21 April 1699 and returning on 3 May. In 1701 he visited Constantinople. He resumed his chaplaincy the next year, and left Smyrna on 10 February 1701–2, taking his homeward journey by Gallipoli and Adrianople where he joined Lord Paget, who was returning from an embassy to the Sublime Porte.

Travelling as a member of the ambassador's household, Chishull passed through Bulgaria, Wallachia, Transylvania, Hungary, and Germany to Holland. At Leyden, he took leave of Lord Paget and returned to England alone.

Chishull soon afterwards became lecturer of St Olave Hart Street; he married and resigned his fellowship. He was then instituted to the living of Walthamstow, Essex. In 1711 he was appointed chaplain to the queen. On 1 September 1708 he was provided with a living as vicar of Walthamstow, Essex, in 1708. He settled there for the rest of his life.

Chishull died at Walthamstow on 18 May 1733.

== Works ==
Chishull kept a journal, eventually published with help from Richard Mead. He published copiously as a scholar, particularly Latin verses, numismatical works, notes from his travels, and his Antiquitates Asiaticae (1728). The Antiquitates was a collaborative work involving William Sherard, Antonio Picenini, Joseph de Tournefort among others.

As a theologian Chishull engaged in the debate on mortalism, attacking Henry Dodwell. Dodwell replied to Chishull and Samuel Clarke, in Expostulation, relating to the late insults of Mr Clark and Mr Chishull (1708).

== Notes ==
Attribution

This article incorporates text from a publication now in the public domain: Hunt, William (1887). "Chishull, Edmund". In Stephen, Leslie (ed.). Dictionary of National Biography. Vol. 10. London: Smith, Elder & Co.
