= George Cecil Renouard =

English classical and oriental scholar

George Cecil Renouard (7 September 1780 – 15 February 1867) was an English classical and oriental scholar.

== Biography ==
Renouard, born at Stamford, Lincolnshire, on 7 September 1780, was the youngest son of Peter Renouard of Stamford (d. 1801), adjutant in the Rutland Militia, by Mary, daughter of John Henry Ott, rector of Gamston, Nottinghamshire, and prebendary of Richmond and Peterborough.

George entered St Paul's School, London, in 1793, and in the same year, on the nomination of George III, was admitted to Charterhouse School. From there, in 1798, he proceeded to Trinity College, Cambridge, and then, in 1800, moved to Sidney Sussex. He graduated Bachelor of Arts (BA) in 1802, and per literas regias Cambridge Master of Arts (MA Cantab) in 1805, and Bachelor of Divinity (BD) in 1811.

After obtaining a fellowship in 1804, he became chaplain to the British Embassy at Constantinople. In 1806 he returned to England and served as curate of Great St Mary's, Cambridge.

From January 1811 to 1814 he was chaplain to the factory at Smyrna. During his residence there he discovered on a rock near Nymphio a figure which he identified with the Sesostris of Herodotus. In 1815 he returned to Cambridge to fill the post of Lord Almoner's Professor of Arabic, which he held till 1821. For a time he also acted as curate of Grantchester, near Cambridge, but in 1818 was presented to the valuable college living of Swanscombe, Kent.

While at Smyrna in 1813 he baptised John William Burgon, with whom in later life he was very intimate. He looked over the manuscript of Burgon's prize essay on "The Life and Character of Sir Thomas Gresham", and publicly read the essay at the Mansion House, London, on 14 May 1836. Burgon corresponded with him from 1836 to 1852, and dedicated to him his "Fifty Smaller Scriptural Cottage Prints" in 1851.

Renouard died unmarried at Swanscombe rectory on 15 February 1867 and was buried in Swanscombe churchyard on 21 February.

== Works ==
Renouard was an admirable classical scholar, was acquainted with French, German and Italian language, and gained during his time in the Near East an intimate knowledge of the Arabic, Turkish and Hebrew languages.

Although his publications were few, he obtained a wide reputation as a linguist, geographer and botanist. During the forty-nine years that he resided at Swanscombe, he maintained a voluminous correspondence with the most distinguished orientalists and geographers of Europe, and was an industrious contributor to the journals of learned societies.

For the British and Foreign Bible Society he corrected the proofs of the translations of the scriptures into Turkish and other eastern languages. He was a leading member of the translation committee of the Royal Asiatic Society, to which he was elected in 1824, revising many of its publications. His paper on the language of the Berbers was communicated to the society in 1836. From 1836 to 1846 he was honorary foreign secretary of the Royal Geographical Society, and actively interested himself in the Syro-Egyptian Society and the Numismatic Society.

In the Encyclopædia Metropolitana, third division, "History and Biography", he contributed to the "History of the Roman Republic", 1852 (chapters vii, viii, and x) and to the "History of Greece, Macedonia, and Syria", 1852 (chapter iii).
