= Melissa Lane =

American academic

- Occupations: Professor, academic

Academic background
- Education: Harvard University (BA); University of Cambridge (MPhil, PhD)

Academic work
- Discipline: Political Theory
- Sub-discipline: Ancient Greek and Roman Political Thought, Plato, Aristotle, Climate Change, Environmental Political Theory, Modern Political Thought
- Institutions: Princeton University

Melissa Lane is an American academic and professor at Princeton University, where she holds the Class of 1943 professorship in the Department of Politics. She graduated summa cum laude from Harvard University in 1989 with an undergraduate degree in Social Studies, and later earned an MPhil degree and a PhD degree in Philosophy from the University of Cambridge, where she also served as a lecturer. Lane joined Princeton's faculty in 2009. Throughout her career, she has received numerous honors, including a Marshall Scholarship, Truman Scholarship, Guggenheim Fellowship in 2012, and the Phi Beta Kappa Teaching Prize in 2015.

A political theorist, Lane specializes in ancient Greek political thought and its modern significance.

== Early life and education ==
Lane attended public schools in Los Angeles, California, serving as a student member of the California State Board of Education.

She graduated summa cum laude from Harvard University with a degree in Social Studies in 1989. She briefly worked as an aide and speechwriter for President Oscar Arias Sanchez of Costa Rica after college who she met after he gave the Harvard graduation speech. She then studied at Cambridge University as a Marshall, Truman, and Phi Beta Kappa scholar, graduating with a M.Phil in 1992 and Ph.D. in Philosophy in 1995.

== Academic career ==
She taught at Cambridge University in the Faculty of History as a lecturer after graduating. In 2009, she joined Princeton University as a professor; in 2014, she held the Class of 1943 professorship in the Department of Politics. She is associated faculty in the Department of Classics and Philosophy. She directed the Center for Human Values from 2016 to 2024 and was the first director for the Program in Values and Public Life. She teaches in the history of political thought, specializing in ancient Greek thought and in normative political thought about environmental ethics and politics.

She was awarded a Guggenheim Fellowship in 2012 and a 2015 Phi Beta Kappa Teaching Prize, among other awards. She has been a fellow at King's College, Cambridge, the Royal Historical Society, and the Royal Society of Arts.

== Publications ==
=== Books ===
==== Author ====
- Lane, Melissa (2015). The Birth of Politics: Eight Greek and Roman Political Ideas and Why They Matter. Princeton: Princeton University Press. (US edition).
  - —————— (2014). Greek and Roman Political Ideas. London: Penguin Pelican. (UK, Canada, Australia and New Zealand edition).
- —————— (2012). Eco-Republic: What the Ancients Can Teach Us about Ethics, Virtue, and Sustainable Living. Princeton: Princeton University Press. (US edition).
  - —————— (2011). Eco-Republic: Ancient Ethics for a Green Age. Oxford: Peter Lang. (UK edition).
- —————— (2001). Plato's Progeny: How Socrates and Plato Still Captivate the Modern Mind. London: Duckworth.
- —————— (1998). Method and Politics in Plato's Statesman. Cambridge: Cambridge University Press.

==== Editor ====
- Lane, Melissa; Dimas, Panos; Meyer, Susan Sauvé (2021). Plato's Statesman: A Philosophical Discussion. Oxford: Oxford University Press.
- ——————; Harte, Verity (2013). Politeia in Greek and Roman Philosophy. Cambridge: Cambridge University Press.
- ——————; Ruehl, Martin A. (2011). A Poet's Reich: Politics and Culture in the George Circle. Rochester, NY: Camden House.

=== Selected publications ===
- Lane, Melissa (2023), "Ancient Political Philosophy", in Zalta, Edward N.; Nodelman, Uri (eds.), The Stanford Encyclopedia of Philosophy (Summer 2023 ed.), Metaphysics Research Lab, Stanford University
- —————— (March 2014). "When the Experts are Uncertain: Scientific Knowledge and the Ethics of Democratic Judgement". Episteme. 11 (1): 97–118. doi:10.1017/epi.2013.48. ISSN 1742-3600.
- —————— (2012). "The Origins of the Statesman–Demagogue Distinction in and after Ancient Athens". Journal of the History of Ideas. 73 (2): 179–200. doi:10.1353/jhi.2012.0020. ISSN 1086-3222.
- —————— (November 9, 2006). The evolution of eirôneia in classical greek texts: why socratic eirôneia is not Socratic irony. Vol. 31. pp. 49–83. ISBN 978-0-19-920421-2.
- —————— (1999). "Plato, Popper, Strauss, and Utopianism: Open Secrets?". History of Philosophy Quarterly. 16 (2): 119–142. ISSN 0740-0675. JSTOR 27744811.
- —————— (1998). "Argument and Agreement in Plato's "Crito"". History of Political Thought. 19 (3): 313–330. ISSN 0143-781X. JSTOR 26217487.
