= John Leng (bishop) =

English churchman and academic

The Right Reverend John Leng
- Bishop of Norwich
- Diocese: Diocese of Norwich
- Installed: 1723
- Term ended: 1727
- Predecessor: Thomas Green
- Successor: William Baker

Orders
- Consecration: 3 November 1723 by William Wake

Personal details
- Born: 1665 Thornton-le-Dale
- Died: 1727 (aged 61–62) London
- Buried: St Margaret's, Westminster
- Denomination: Church of England
- Spouse: Elizabeth
- Children: Elizabeth, Susanna
- Occupation: churchman, academic, bishop of Norwich from 1723
- Education: St Paul's School, London
- Alma mater: St Catharine's College, Cambridge

John Leng (1665–1727) was an English churchman and academic, bishop of Norwich from 1723.

== Life ==
He was born at Thornton le Dale, near Pickering, in Yorkshire. He received his early education at St. Paul's School, and obtained an exhibition at Catharine Hall, Cambridge, where he was admitted as a sizar on 26 March 1683. He graduated B.A. in 1686. His subsequent degrees were M.A. 1690, B.D. 1698, D.D. 1716.

He was elected fellow of his college 13 September 1688, and subsequently became known as a tutor and Latinist. scholar. At the consecration of the new chapel of his college by Simon Patrick, bishop of Ely, in 1701, he preached the sermon. In 1708 he was presented by his old pupil, Sir Nicholas Carew, to the rectory of Beddington, Surrey, which he held in commendam to his death.

In 1717 and 1718 he delivered the Boyle Lectures, which were published the following year, his subject being The Natural Obligations to believe the Principles of Religion and Divine Revelation. He became chaplain in ordinary to George I, and in 1723 was appointed bishop of Norwich. He was consecrated at Lambeth by Archbishop William Wake on 3 November of the same year. He held the see barely three years, having died in London of small-pox, caught at the coronation of George II, 26 October 1727. He was buried in St. Margaret's, Westminster, where a mural tablet was erected to his memory in the south aisle of the chancel.

== Works ==
In 1695 he published the Plutus and the Nubes of Aristophanes, with a Latin translation, and in 1701 he edited the Cambridge edition of Terence, adding a dissertation on the metres of the author. He also published a revised edition of Sir Roger L'Estrange's translation of Cicero's De Officiis.

Leng published fourteen single sermons, preached on public occasions, among them one preached before the Society for the Reformation of Manners at Bow Church, 29 December 1718. His Boyle Lectures went to a second edition.

== Family ==
Leng was twice married. By his first wife he had no children. By his second, Elizabeth, daughter of a Mr. Hawes of Sussex, he had two daughters, Elizabeth and Susanna.

== Notes ==
Church of England titles
Preceded by Thomas Green	Bishop of Norwich; 1723–1727	Succeeded by William Baker
