= Thomas Green (bishop) =

English academic and bishop (1658–1738)

The Right Reverend Thomas Green
- Bishop of Ely
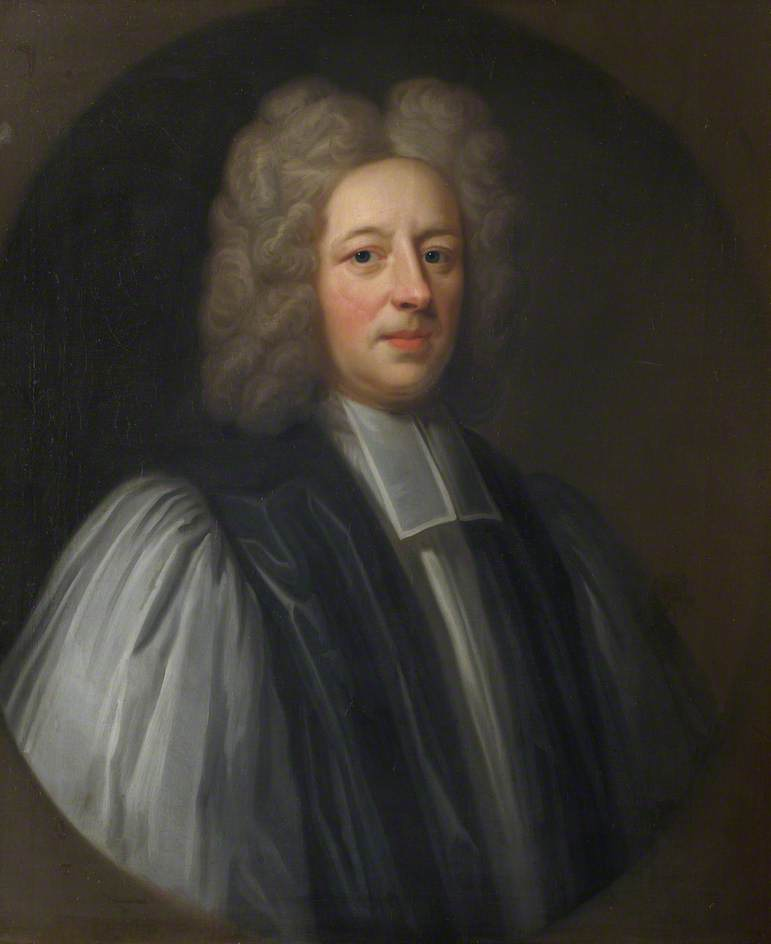
- Diocese: Diocese of Ely
- In office: 1723–1738
- Predecessor: William Fleetwood
- Successor: Robert Butts
- Other post: Bishop of Norwich (1721–1723)

Orders
- Consecration: 8 October 1721 by William Wake

Personal details
- Born: baptized 12 December 1658 St Peter Mancroft, Norwich
- Died: 18 May 1738 (aged 79) Ely House, Holborn, London
- Buried: Ely Cathedral
- Denomination: Anglican
- Spouse: Catherine Trimnell
- Education: Norwich School; Corpus Christi College, Cambridge

Thomas Green (less properly Greene) (1658 – 18 May 1738) was an English academic and bishop.

== Life ==
He was born in Norwich, and educated at Norwich School and Corpus Christi College, Cambridge, where he graduated B.A. in 1679 and became a Fellow in 1680. He was Master of Corpus from 1698 to 1716, clashing with Robert Moss, and Vice-chancellor of the University of Cambridge, in 1699 and 1713.

With the support of Thomas Tenison, he became chaplain to Sir Stephen Fox, and rector of Minster-in-Thanet. He was Archdeacon of Canterbury from 1708 to 1721.

A Whig in politics, he became chaplain to George I of Great Britain, and rector of St. Martin's-in-the-Fields in 1716. In 1721 he became Bishop of Norwich, and in 1723 Bishop of Ely. As bishop of Ely, Green had visitatorial powers at Trinity College, Cambridge, and intervened from 1729 in the quarrel between Richard Bentley, who was the Master, and the Fellows. The matter dragged out and went to the House of Lords, only terminating in Green's death.

He was known as a “finical” character, a taker of snuff and sometimes called “Miss Green” for his feminine face.

Academic offices
Preceded by William Stanley	Master of Corpus Christi College, Cambridge; 1698–1716	Succeeded by Samuel Bradford
Church of England titles
Preceded by Charles Trimnell	Bishop of Norwich; 1721–1723	Succeeded by John Leng
Preceded by William Fleetwood	Bishop of Ely; 1723–1738	Succeeded by Robert Butts
