= Thomas Gooch =

English bishop and baronet (1674–1754)

The Right Reverend Sir Thomas Gooch Bt
- Bishop of Ely
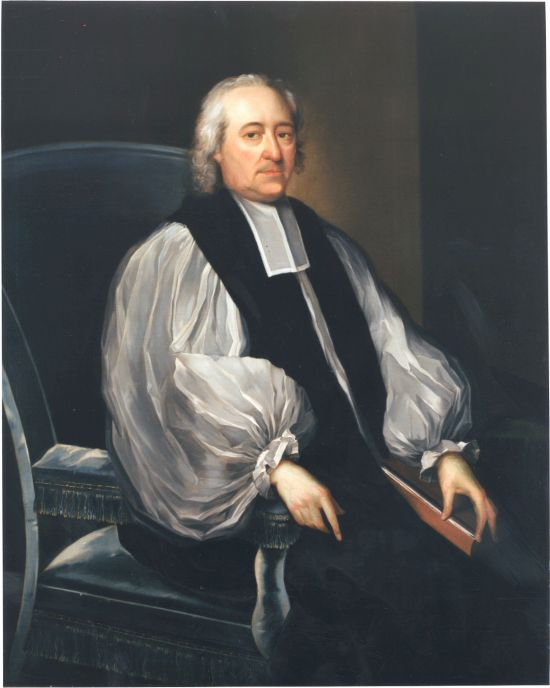
- In office: 1748–1754
- Predecessor: Robert Butts
- Successor: Matthias Mawson
- Other posts: Bishop of Bristol (1737–1738); Bishop of Norwich (1738–1748)
- Previous post: Vice-Chancellor of the University of Cambridge

Personal details
- Born: 9 January 1674
- Died: 14 February 1754 (aged 80)
- Parents: Thomas Gooch and Frances Ann Lane
- Spouse: Mary Sherlock, Hannah Miller, Mary Compton
- Children: Sir Thomas Gooch, 3rd Bt. Rev. John Gooch
- Education: Gonville and Caius College, Cambridge
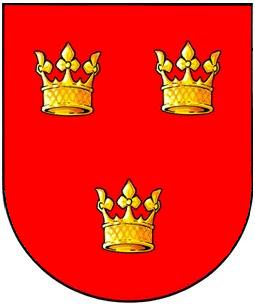
- Coat of arms

Dr. Thomas Gooch (1674–1754) was an English clergyman, successively Bishop of Bristol (1737), Bishop of Norwich (1738), and Bishop of Ely (1747 until his death).

In 1751, by a special remainder, he inherited the title created for his brother Sir William Gooch, 1st Baronet, but did not use it.

== Life ==
Gooch was born to Thomas Gooch of Yarmouth, and educated at Gonville and Caius College, Cambridge, which he entered in 1691. He graduated B.A. in 1694 (M.A. 1698), B.D. in 1706 and D.D. in 1711. He became chaplain to Henry Compton, Bishop of London, and preached at his funeral in 1713. Subsequently, he was chaplain to Queen Anne, and rector of St Clement Eastcheap and St Martin Orgar. He was archdeacon of Essex from 1714 to 1737.

Gooch was Master of Gonville and Caius from 1716 and Vice-Chancellor of the University of Cambridge in 1717. He became successively Bishop of Bristol in 1737, Bishop of Norwich in 1738, and Bishop of Ely in 1747. In 1751 he inherited the title of baronet from his brother Sir William Gooch, 1st Baronet.

Gooch's first wife was Mary Sherlock, daughter of William Sherlock. They had a son, Sir Thomas Gooch, 3rd Baronet of Benacre. He married twice more. He died at Ely Place, and was buried in the chapel at Gonville and Caius, where there is a monument to him on the south wall.

== Arms ==
Coat of arms of Thomas Gooch
Crest A talbot statant per pale Argent and Sable. Escutcheon Per pale Argent and Sable a chevron between three talbots statant all counterchanged, on a chief Gules three leopards’ faces Or. Motto Fide Et Virtute

Academic offices
Preceded by John Ellys	Master of Gonville and Caius College, Cambridge; 1716–1754	Succeeded by Sir James Burrough
Preceded by William Grigg	Vice-Chancellor of the University of Cambridge; 1717	Succeeded by Thomas Crosse
Baronetage of Great Britain
Preceded by William Gooch	Baronet (of Benacre Hall); 1751–1754	Succeeded by Thomas Gooch
Church of England titles
Preceded by Thomas Secker	Bishop of Bristol; 1737–1738	Succeeded by Joseph Butler
Preceded by Robert Butts	Bishop of Norwich; 1738–1748	Succeeded by Samuel Lisle
Preceded by Robert Butts	Bishop of Ely; 1748–1754	Succeeded by Matthias Mawson
