= List of cities and counties in Virginia =

Independent cities and counties of Virginia
- Location: Commonwealth of Virginia
- Number: 95 Counties; 38 Independent cities 133 Second-level subdivisions
- Populations: (Counties): 2,318 (Highland) – 1,167,873 (Fairfax) (Independent cities): 3,477 (Norton) – 453,737 (Virginia Beach)
- Areas: (Counties): 26 square miles (67 km^{2}) (Arlington) – 978 square miles (2,530 km^{2}) (Pittsylvania) (Independent cities): 2 square miles (5.2 km^{2}) (Falls Church) – 400 square miles (1,000 km^{2}) (Suffolk)
- Government: County government
- Subdivisions: (Counties): towns, unincorporated communities, census-designated places (Independent cities): Borough, Neighborhood

Virginia counties and cities by year of establishment

The Commonwealth of Virginia is divided into 95 counties, along with 38 independent cities that are considered county-equivalents for census purposes, totaling 133 second-level subdivisions, the third most of any state. In Virginia, cities are co-equal levels of government to counties, but towns are part of counties. For some counties, for statistical purposes, the Bureau of Economic Analysis combines any independent cities with the county that it was once part of (before the legislation creating independent cities took place in 1871).

Many county seats are politically not a part of the counties they serve; under Virginia law, all municipalities incorporated as cities are independent cities and are not part of any county. Some of the cities in the Hampton Roads area, including Virginia Beach, Chesapeake, Newport News, Hampton, and Suffolk were formed from an entire county. These cities are no longer county seats, since the counties ceased to exist once the cities were completely formed but are functionally equivalent to counties. Also in Virginia, a county seat may be an independent city surrounded by, but not part of, the county of which it is the administrative center; for example, Fairfax City is both the county seat of Fairfax County and is completely surrounded by Fairfax County, but the city is politically independent of the county.

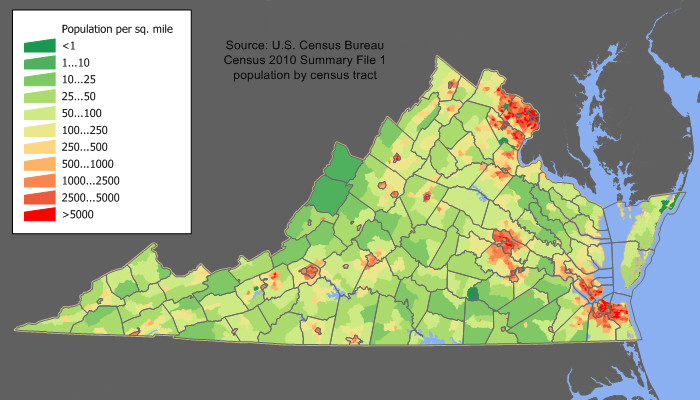
Map showing the population density of Virginia

Many towns are as large as cities but are not incorporated as cities and are situated within a parent county or counties. Seven independent cities had 2020 populations of less than 10,000 with the smallest, Norton having a population of only 3,687. In 2020, the largest towns were Leesburg (with 48,250 people) and Blacksburg (44,826). Six other towns also had populations of over 10,000 people. For a complete list of these towns, see List of towns in Virginia. For major unincorporated population centers, see List of unincorporated communities in Virginia.

Virginia's independent cities were classified by the Virginia General Assembly in 1871 as cities of the first class and cities of the second class. The Virginia Constitution of 1902 defined first class cities as those having a population of 10,000 or more based upon the last census enumeration while second class cities were those that had a population of less than 10,000. Cities that previously been granted a city charter, but did not have the requisite population, had their status grandfathered in.

Second class did not have a court of record and were required to share the cost of that court with their adjacent county and also shared the cost for three constitutional officers of that court—generally, the clerk, commonwealth attorney and sheriff—and those shared officers stood for election in both the city and the county. At least two constitutional officers—treasurer and commissioner of the revenue—were required to be elected solely by the residents of the city. The distinction between first and second class cities was ended with the Virginia Constitution of 1971. However, cities that were classified as second class cities at the time of the adoption of the 1971 Virginia Constitution were authorized to continue sharing their court system and three constitutional officers with the adjacent county. As of 2026, 14 of Virginia's independent cities retain these features.

There are several counties and cities that have the same name but are separate politically. These currently include Fairfax, Franklin, Richmond, and Roanoke. In the past they also included Norfolk and Alexandria, whose counties changed their names, ostensibly to end some of the confusion; as well as Bedford, where a city was surrounded by a county of the same name from 1968 until 2013, when the city reverted to town status. A city and county that share a name may be completely unrelated in geography. For example, Richmond County is nowhere near the City of Richmond, and Franklin County is even farther from the City of Franklin.

More Virginia counties are named for women than in any other state.

Virginia's postal abbreviation is VA and its FIPS state code is 51.

List of the 95 counties in the Commonwealth of Virginia (links shown under FIPS County Code are for the U.S. Census Bureau Statistics Info Page for that county):

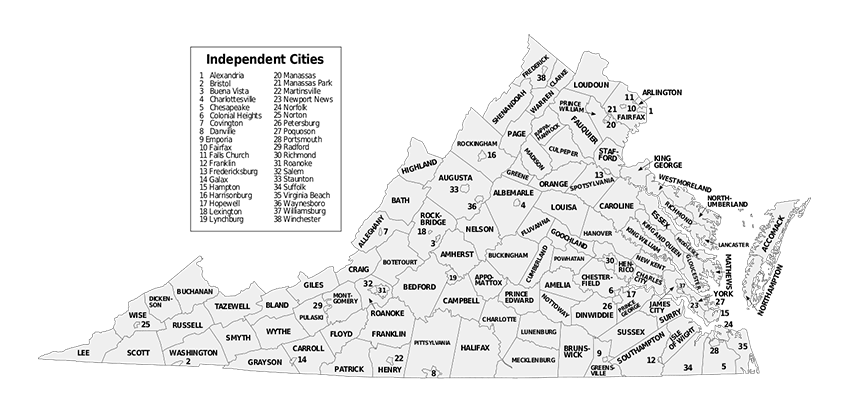
Virginia counties and independent cities

== List of counties ==
County	FIPS code	County seat	Est.	Origin	Etymology	Population	Area	Map
Accomack County	001	Accomac	December 31, 1663	Accomac Shire was established in 1634 as one of the original eight shires of Virginia. In 1642, it was renamed Northampton County. Then in 1663, Northampton County was divided into two counties. The southern half remained Northampton County while the northern half became Accomac County -- later renamed Accomack with a "k."	From the Native American word Accawmack, meaning "on the other side", referencing the county's position across Chesapeake Bay	33,859	455 sq mi (1,178 km^{2})	State map highlighting Accomack County
Albemarle County	003	Charlottesville	December 31, 1744	In 1744, the Virginia General Assembly created Albemarle County by taking the northern portion of Goochland County.	Willem Anne van Keppel, 2nd Earl of Albemarle, colonial proprietary governor	118,356	723 sq mi (1,873 km^{2})	State map highlighting Albemarle County
Alleghany County	005	Covington	January 5, 1822	Formed from parts of Bath and Botetourt counties as well as Monroe County (now in WV)	Alleghany Mountains	14,546	446 sq mi (1,155 km^{2})	State map highlighting Alleghany County
Amelia County	007	Amelia	March 25, 1735	Formed from Brunswick and Prince George counties	Princess Amelia Sophia, second daughter of George II of Great Britain	13,632	357 sq mi (925 km^{2})	State map highlighting Amelia County
Amherst County	009	Amherst	May 1, 1761	From Albemarle county	Jeffery Amherst, British conqueror of Quebec during the Seven Years' War and colonial governor of Virginia	31,962	475 sq mi (1,230 km^{2})	State map highlighting Amherst County
Appomattox County	011	Appomattox	May 1, 1845	From Buckingham, Campbell, Charlotte and Prince Edward counties	Appomattox River	17,172	334 sq mi (865 km^{2})	State map highlighting Appomattox County
Arlington County	013	Arlington	September 7, 1846	Annexed from the District of Columbia, having previously been part of Fairfax County prior to the district's formation	Arlington House, The Robert E. Lee Memorial, originally called Alexandria County; renamed in 1920	243,931	26 sq mi (67 km^{2})	State map highlighting Arlington County
Augusta County	015	Staunton	December 15, 1738	From Orange County	Augusta of Saxe-Gotha, the Princess of Wales	78,940	971 sq mi (2,515 km^{2})	State map highlighting Augusta County
Bath County	017	Warm Springs	May 1, 1791	From Augusta, Botetourt and Greenbrier counties May 1, 1791	Bath, England	4,076	532 sq mi (1,378 km^{2})	State map highlighting Bath County
Bedford County	019	Bedford	May 10, 1754	From Lunenburg county	John Russell, 4th Duke of Bedford, British politician and one of the head negotiators of the Peace of Paris	83,059	755 sq mi (1,955 km^{2})	State map highlighting Bedford County
Bland County	021	Bland	March 30, 1861	From Giles, Tazewell, and Wythe counties	Richard Bland, member of the Continental Congress and publisher of the American Revolutionary War-era tract An Inquiry into the Rights of the British Colonies	6,151	359 sq mi (930 km^{2})	State map highlighting Bland County
Botetourt County	023	Fincastle	January 31, 1770	From Augusta county.	Norborne Berkeley, 4th Baron Botetourt, colonial governor of Virginia	34,144	543 sq mi (1,406 km^{2})	State map highlighting Botetourt County
Brunswick County	025	Lawrenceville	December 17, 1720	From Prince George county. Parts of Surry and Isle of Wight counties were added in 1732 (when the county's government was established.)	Duchy of Brunswick-Lüneburg, from which the current line of British monarchs hailed	15,727	566 sq mi (1,466 km^{2})	State map highlighting Brunswick County
Buchanan County	027	Grundy	February 13, 1858	From Russell and Tazewell counties	James Buchanan, fifteenth U.S. President	18,492	504 sq mi (1,305 km^{2})	State map highlighting Buchanan County
Buckingham County	029	Buckingham	May 1, 1761	From Albemarle county	Duke of Buckingham	17,137	581 sq mi (1,505 km^{2})	State map highlighting Buckingham County
Campbell County	031	Rustburg	February 1, 1782	From Bedford county	William Campbell, Revolutionary War general	55,629	504 sq mi (1,305 km^{2})	State map highlighting Campbell County
Caroline County	033	Bowling Green	May 1, 1728	From Essex, King and Queen, and King William counties	Caroline of Ansbach, wife of King George II of Great Britain	34,413	533 sq mi (1,380 km^{2})	State map highlighting Caroline County
Carroll County	035	Hillsville	January 17, 1842	From Grayson county	Charles Carroll of Carrollton	29,299	476 sq mi (1,233 km^{2})	State map highlighting Carroll County
Charles City County	036	Charles City	December 31, 1634	Colonial division before 1635	King Charles I of England	6,623	182 sq mi (471 km^{2})	State map highlighting Charles City County
Charlotte County	037	Charlotte Court House	March 1, 1765	From Lunenburg county	Charlotte of Mecklenburg-Strelitz, wife of King George III of Great Britain	11,401	475 sq mi (1,230 km^{2})	State map highlighting Charlotte County
Chesterfield County	041	Chesterfield	May 25, 1749	From Henrico County	Philip Stanhope, 4th Earl of Chesterfield, British politician and Lord of the Bedchamber	397,148	426 sq mi (1,103 km^{2})	State map highlighting Chesterfield County
Clarke County	043	Berryville	March 8, 1836	From Frederick County	George Rogers Clarke, Revolutionary War general	15,609	177 sq mi (458 km^{2})	State map highlighting Clarke County
Craig County	045	New Castle	March 21, 1851	Formed from Botetourt, Roanoke, Giles, and Monroe (in present-day West Virginia) Counties	Robert Craig, U.S. Representative from Virginia	4,800	330 sq mi (855 km^{2})	State map highlighting Craig County
Culpeper County	047	Culpeper	May 17, 1749	Culpeper County was established in 1749 from Orange County, Virginia.	Thomas Colepeper, 2nd Baron Colepeper, colonial proprietary governor	57,666	381 sq mi (987 km^{2})	State map highlighting Culpeper County
Cumberland County	049	Cumberland	May 20, 1749	Goochland County	Prince William, Duke of Cumberland, British general, politician, and son of King George II	10,352	298 sq mi (772 km^{2})	State map highlighting Cumberland County
Dickenson County	051	Clintwood	March 3, 1880	Formed from parts of Buchanan, Russell, and Wise Counties	William J. Dickenson (1827–1907), member of the Virginia House of Delegates	13,236	333 sq mi (862 km^{2})	State map highlighting Dickenson County
Dinwiddie County	053	Dinwiddie	May 1, 1752	From Prince George County	Robert Dinwiddie, colonial lieutenant governor of Virginia	28,896	504 sq mi (1,305 km^{2})	State map highlighting Dinwiddie County
Essex County	057	Tappahannock	April 26, 1692	From the original Rappahannock County, Virginia, commonly known as Old Rappahannock County, which was split to form Essex and Richmond counties.	Essex, England	10,654	258 sq mi (668 km^{2})	State map highlighting Essex County
Fairfax County	059	Fairfax	December 1, 1742	From Prince William County	Thomas Fairfax, 6th Lord Fairfax of Cameron, the only British noble resident in Virginia	1,167,873	396 sq mi (1,026 km^{2})	State map highlighting Fairfax County
Fauquier County	061	Warrenton	May 1, 1759	From Prince William County	Francis Fauquier, colonial lieutenant governor of Virginia	76,503	650 sq mi (1,683 km^{2})	State map highlighting Fauquier County
Floyd County	063	Floyd	February 1, 1831	From Montgomery County	John Floyd, governor of Virginia	15,789	382 sq mi (989 km^{2})	State map highlighting Floyd County
Fluvanna County	065	Palmyra	July 1, 1777	From Henrico County	From the Latin name for the James River, which itself translates to "Annie's River" in honor of Queen Anne	28,975	287 sq mi (743 km^{2})	State map highlighting Fluvanna County
Franklin County	067	Rocky Mount	January 1, 1786	Formed from parts of Bedford and Henry Counties	Benjamin Franklin, publisher, orator, scholar, and U.S. Founding Father	55,526	692 sq mi (1,792 km^{2})	State map highlighting Franklin County
Frederick County	069	Winchester	December 15, 1738	From Orange County	Frederick, Prince of Wales, eldest son of George II	99,955	415 sq mi (1,075 km^{2})	State map highlighting Frederick County
Giles County	071	Pearisburg	May 1, 1806	Formed from Montgomery, Monroe, Wythe, and Tazewell Counties	William Branch Giles, U.S. Senator from Virginia	16,564	358 sq mi (927 km^{2})	State map highlighting Giles County
Gloucester County	073	Gloucester	December 31, 1651	From York County	Prince Henry, Duke of Gloucester	40,097	217 sq mi (562 km^{2})	State map highlighting Gloucester County
Goochland County	075	Goochland	May 1, 1728	From Henrico County	William Gooch, colonial lieutenant governor of Virginia	29,187	284 sq mi (736 km^{2})	State map highlighting Goochland County
Grayson County	077	Independence	May 1, 1793	From Wythe County	William Grayson, U.S. Senator from Virginia	15,230	443 sq mi (1,147 km^{2})	State map highlighting Grayson County
Greene County	079	Stanardsville	January 24, 1838	From Orange County	Nathanael Greene, Revolutionary War general	21,958	157 sq mi (407 km^{2})	State map highlighting Greene County
Greensville County	081	Emporia	February 1, 1781	From Brunswick County	Richard Grenville, commander of the English expedition to found Roanoke Colony	11,181	296 sq mi (767 km^{2})	State map highlighting Greensville County
Halifax County	083	Halifax	May 10, 1752	From Lunenburg County	George Montagu-Dunk, 2nd Earl of Halifax, President of the Board of Trade	33,447	814 sq mi (2,108 km^{2})	State map highlighting Halifax County
Hanover County	085	Hanover	May 1, 1721	From the area of New Kent County called St. Paul's Parish	Electorate of Hanover, from which the current line of British monarchs hailed	116,423	473 sq mi (1,225 km^{2})	State map highlighting Hanover County
Henrico County	087	Laurel	December 31, 1634	Original county of the Colony under English rule	Henry Frederick, Prince of Wales, oldest son of James I of England	342,775	238 sq mi (616 km^{2})	State map highlighting Henrico County
Henry County	089	Martinsville	December 31, 1776	From Pittsylvania County, it was initially named Patrick Henry County	Patrick Henry, governor of Virginia and U.S. Founding Father	49,242	382 sq mi (989 km^{2})	State map highlighting Henry County
Highland County	091	Monterey	May 1, 1847	From Bath and Pendleton Counties	Mountainous topography	2,318	416 sq mi (1,077 km^{2})	State map highlighting Highland County
Isle of Wight County	093	Isle of Wight	December 31, 1634	Original county of the Colony under English rule, initially named Warrosquyoake Shire	Isle of Wight, England	41,321	316 sq mi (818 km^{2})	State map highlighting Isle of Wight County
James City County	095	Williamsburg	December 31, 1634	Original county of the Colony under English rule	King James I of England	83,326	143 sq mi (370 km^{2})	State map highlighting James City County
King and Queen County	097	King and Queen	May 12, 1691	King and Queen County was established in 1691 from New Kent County, Virginia.	King William III and Queen Mary II	6,743	316 sq mi (818 km^{2})	State map highlighting King and Queen County
King George County	099	King George	April 23, 1721	From Richmond County	George I of Great Britain	29,646	180 sq mi (466 km^{2})	State map highlighting King George County
King William County	101	King William	April 11, 1702	English colonists formed King William County in 1702 out of King and Queen County, Virginia.	William III of England	19,617	275 sq mi (712 km^{2})	State map highlighting King William County
Lancaster County	103	Lancaster	December 31, 1651	Lancaster County was established in 1651 from Northumberland and York counties.	Lancaster, England	10,995	133 sq mi (344 km^{2})	State map highlighting Lancaster County
Lee County	105	Jonesville	May 13, 1793	From Russell County	Light Horse Harry Lee, Revolutionary War general and governor of Virginia	21,642	437 sq mi (1,132 km^{2})	State map highlighting Lee County
Loudoun County	107	Leesburg	July 1, 1757	From Fairfax County	John Campbell, 4th Earl of Loudoun, British Commander-in-Chief, North America during the Seven Years' War	449,749	520 sq mi (1,347 km^{2})	State map highlighting Loudoun County
Louisa County	109	Louisa	December 1, 1742	From Hanover County	Princess Louise, youngest daughter of George II	42,924	498 sq mi (1,290 km^{2})	State map highlighting Louisa County
Lunenburg County	111	Lunenburg	May 1, 1746	From Brunswick County	Duchy of Brunswick-Lüneburg, from which the current line of British monarchs hailed	12,058	432 sq mi (1,119 km^{2})	State map highlighting Lunenburg County
Madison County	113	Madison	May 1, 1793	From Orange County	James Madison, Congressman from Virginia, principal author of the U.S. Constitution, and future U.S. President	14,237	322 sq mi (834 km^{2})	State map highlighting Madison County
Mathews County	115	Mathews	May 1, 1791	From Gloucester County	Thomas Mathews, Revolutionary War general.	8,529	86 sq mi (223 km^{2})	State map highlighting Mathews County
Mecklenburg County	117	Boydton	March 1, 1765	From Lunenburg County	Charlotte of Mecklenburg-Strelitz, wife of King George III	30,747	624 sq mi (1,616 km^{2})	State map highlighting Mecklenburg County
Middlesex County	119	Saluda	December 31, 1674	From Lancaster County	Middlesex, England	10,841	130 sq mi (337 km^{2})	State map highlighting Middlesex County
Montgomery County	121	Christiansburg	December 31, 1776	From Fincastle County	Richard Montgomery, Revolutionary War general	98,434	388 sq mi (1,005 km^{2})	State map highlighting Montgomery County
Nelson County	125	Lovingston	June 1, 1808	From Amherst County	Thomas Nelson Jr., governor of Virginia and signer of the Declaration of Independence	14,920	472 sq mi (1,222 km^{2})	State map highlighting Nelson County
New Kent County	127	New Kent	December 31, 1654	New Kent County was established in 1654 from York County, Virginia.	Kent, England	28,022	210 sq mi (544 km^{2})	State map highlighting New Kent County
Northampton County	131	Eastville	December 31, 1634	Original county of the Colony under English rule, initially named Accomac Shire. In 1642, it was renamed Northampton County. However, in 1663, Northampton County was divided into two counties. The southern half remained Northampton County while the northern half once again became Accomac County -- later spelled Accomack.	Northamptonshire, England	11,879	207 sq mi (536 km^{2})	State map highlighting Northampton County
Northumberland County	133	Heathsville	December 31, 1648	The county was created by the Virginia General Assembly in 1648 during a period of rapid population growth and geographic expansion.	Northumberland, England	12,557	192 sq mi (497 km^{2})	State map highlighting Northumberland County
Nottoway County	135	Nottoway	May 1, 1789	From the area of Amelia County called Nottaway Parish	Nottoway people	15,796	315 sq mi (816 km^{2})	State map highlighting Nottoway County
Orange County	137	Orange	January 1, 1735	Settlers established the legal entity of Orange County in 1734 from a portion of Spotsylvania County, Virginia.	William IV, Prince of Orange, to celebrate his marriage to the Royal Princess Anne of the House of Hanover, England on March 25, 1734. The county was formed on August 8, 1734	40,083	342 sq mi (886 km^{2})	State map highlighting Orange County
Page County	139	Luray	March 30, 1831	From Shenandoah and Rockingham counties	John Page, governor of Virginia	23,762	311 sq mi (805 km^{2})	State map highlighting Page County
Patrick County	141	Stuart	June 1, 1791	From Patrick Henry County	Patrick Henry, governor of Virginia and U.S. Founding Father	17,424	483 sq mi (1,251 km^{2})	State map highlighting Patrick County
Pittsylvania County	143	Chatham	June 1, 1767	From Halifax County	William Pitt, British Prime Minister	59,490	978 sq mi (2,533 km^{2})	State map highlighting Pittsylvania County
Powhatan County	145	Powhatan	July 1, 1777	From Cumberland County	Powhatan tribe	32,591	261 sq mi (676 km^{2})	State map highlighting Powhatan County
Prince Edward County	147	Farmville	January 1, 1754	From Amelia County	Prince Edward, Duke of York and Albany, brother of George III	22,391	353 sq mi (914 km^{2})	State map highlighting Prince Edward County
Prince George County	149	Prince George	April 23, 1703	From Charles City County	Prince George of Denmark, the husband of Queen Anne	43,936	266 sq mi (689 km^{2})	State map highlighting Prince George County
Prince William County	153	Manassas	March 25, 1731	From Stafford and King George counties	Prince William Augustus, son of George II	502,966	338 sq mi (875 km^{2})	State map highlighting Prince William County
Pulaski County	155	Pulaski	March 30, 1839	From Montgomery and Wythe counties	Kazimierz Pulaski, Polish-born Revolutionary War general	33,586	321 sq mi (831 km^{2})	State map highlighting Pulaski County
Rappahannock County	157	Washington	February 18, 1833	From Culpeper County. The original Rappahannock County, known as Old Rappahannock County, was created in 1656 from part of Lancaster County. Old Rappahannock County became extinct in 1692 when it was split to create Essex and Richmond counties.	Rappahannock River	7,439	267 sq mi (692 km^{2})	State map highlighting Rappahannock County
Richmond County	159	Warsaw	April 26, 1692	From the original Rappahannock County, better known as Old Rappahannock County, which was split to form Richmond and Essex counties.	Charles Lennox, 1st Duke of Richmond, illegitimate son of King Charles II	9,294	192 sq mi (497 km^{2})	State map highlighting Richmond County
Roanoke County	161	Salem	May 1, 1838	From the southern part of Botetourt County	Roanoke River	97,150	251 sq mi (650 km^{2})	State map highlighting Roanoke County
Rockbridge County	163	Lexington	March 1, 1778	From parts of Augusta and Botetourt counties	Natural Bridge	22,663	600 sq mi (1,554 km^{2})	State map highlighting Rockbridge County
Rockingham County	165	Harrisonburg	March 1, 1778	From Augusta County	Charles Watson-Wentworth, 2nd Marquess of Rockingham, British Prime Minister	89,316	851 sq mi (2,204 km^{2})	State map highlighting Rockingham County
Russell County	167	Lebanon	May 1, 1786	From a section of Washington County	William Russell, frontiersman and state representative	25,332	475 sq mi (1,230 km^{2})	State map highlighting Russell County
Scott County	169	Gate City	November 24, 1814	Formed from parts of Washington, Lee, and Russell Counties	Winfield Scott, War of 1812 and later Mexican-American War general	21,200	537 sq mi (1,391 km^{2})	State map highlighting Scott County
Shenandoah County	171	Woodstock	May 15, 1772	Formed from non-county territory; originally named for Governor John Murray, 4th Earl of Dunmore, but renamed in 1778.	Shenandoah River	45,839	512 sq mi (1,326 km^{2})	State map highlighting Shenandoah County
Smyth County	173	Marion	February 23, 1832	From Washington and Wythe counties	Alexander Smyth, Congressman from Virginia	28,882	452 sq mi (1,171 km^{2})	State map highlighting Smyth County
Southampton County	175	Courtland	May 20, 1749	Most of it from part of Warrosquyoake Shire	Disputed; either Southampton, England or Henry Wriothesley, 3rd Earl of Southampton, one of the founders of the Virginia Company	18,110	600 sq mi (1,554 km^{2})	State map highlighting Southampton County
Spotsylvania County	177	Spotsylvania Courthouse	May 1, 1721	Spotsylvania County was established in 1721 from Essex, King and Queen, and King William counties.	Alexander Spotswood, colonial lieutenant governor of Virginia	155,388	401 sq mi (1,039 km^{2})	State map highlighting Spotsylvania County
Stafford County	179	Stafford	December 31, 1664	From part of Westmoreland County	Stafford, England	170,803	270 sq mi (699 km^{2})	State map highlighting Stafford County
Surry County	181	Surry	December 31, 1652	From part of James City County	Surrey, England	6,603	279 sq mi (723 km^{2})	State map highlighting Surry County
Sussex County	183	Sussex	February 1, 1754	From Surry County	Sussex, England	10,755	491 sq mi (1,272 km^{2})	State map highlighting Sussex County
Tazewell County	185	Tazewell	May 1, 1800	From portions of Wythe and Russell counties	Henry Tazewell, U.S. Senator from Virginia	38,635	520 sq mi (1,347 km^{2})	State map highlighting Tazewell County
Warren County	187	Front Royal	March 9, 1836	From Frederick and Shenandoah counties	Joseph Warren, Revolutionary War general	42,740	214 sq mi (554 km^{2})	State map highlighting Warren County
Washington County	191	Abingdon	December 31, 1776	From Fincastle County	George Washington, Revolutionary War commander, U.S. Founding Father, and future U.S. President	53,898	564 sq mi (1,461 km^{2})	State map highlighting Washington County
Westmoreland County	193	Montross	December 31, 1653	From Northumberland County	Westmorland, England	19,715	229 sq mi (593 km^{2})	State map highlighting Westmoreland County
Wise County	195	Wise	February 16, 1856	From Lee, Scott, and Russell Counties	Henry Alexander Wise, governor of Virginia	34,824	403 sq mi (1,044 km^{2})	State map highlighting Wise County
Wythe County	197	Wytheville	May 1, 1790	From Montgomery County	George Wythe, legal scholar and signer of the Declaration of Independence	27,983	463 sq mi (1,199 km^{2})	State map highlighting Wythe County
York County	199	Yorktown	December 31, 1634	Formed in 1634 as one of the eight shires of Virginia. It was originally called Charles River Shire.	James Stuart, Duke of York, the future King James II	71,374	106 sq mi (275 km^{2})	State map highlighting York County

== List of independent cities ==
City	FIPS code	Seat	Est.	Origin	Etymology	Population	Area	Map
Alexandria	510	N/A	July 10, 1902	From Alexandria County	Phillip & John Alexander, brothers and area plantation owners	160,662	15 sq mi (39 km^{2})	State map highlighting Alexandria
Bristol	520	N/A	July 10, 1902	From Washington County	Bristol, England	16,418	12 sq mi (31 km^{2})	State map highlighting Bristol
Buena Vista	530	N/A	July 10, 1902	From Rockbridge County	from the Buena Vista Company, which founded an iron mine in the area and established the town for its laborers	6,672	7 sq mi (18 km^{2})	State map highlighting Buena Vista
Charlottesville	540	N/A	July 10, 1902	From Albemarle County	Charlotte of Mecklenburg-Strelitz, wife of King George III	44,388	10 sq mi (26 km^{2})	State map highlighting Charlottesville
Chesapeake	550	N/A	January 1, 1963	Formed out of consolidation of Norfolk County (extinct) and City of South Norfolk (extinct)	Chesapeake tribe	255,332	341 sq mi (883 km^{2})	State map highlighting Chesapeake
Colonial Heights	570	N/A	March 19, 1948	From Chesterfield County	From the actions of Revolutionary War general Gilbert du Motier, marquis de Lafayette; his soldiers, nicknamed the "Colonials", placed an artillery on high ground overlooking Petersburg	18,738	8 sq mi (21 km^{2})	State map highlighting Colonial Heights
Covington	580	N/A	December 20, 1952	From Alleghany County	Leonard Covington, hero of the Siege of Fort Recovery and Congressman from Maryland	5,680	4 sq mi (10 km^{2})	State map highlighting Covington
Danville	590	N/A	July 10, 1902	From Pittsylvania County	Dan River	41,647	43 sq mi (111 km^{2})	State map highlighting Danville
Emporia	595	N/A	February 28, 1968	From Greensville County	Emporia, Kansas	5,447	7 sq mi (18 km^{2})	State map highlighting Emporia
Fairfax	600	N/A	July 1, 1961	From Fairfax County	Thomas Fairfax, 6th Lord Fairfax of Cameron, only British noble resident in colonial Virginia	26,772	6 sq mi (16 km^{2})	State map highlighting Fairfax
Falls Church	610	N/A	August 16, 1948	From Fairfax County	The Falls Church	15,159	2.1 sq mi (5 km^{2})	State map highlighting Falls Church
Franklin	620	N/A	December 22, 1961	From Southampton County	Benjamin Franklin, publisher, scholar, orator, and U.S. Founding Father	8,478	8 sq mi (21 km^{2})	State map highlighting Franklin
Fredericksburg	630	N/A	July 10, 1902	From Spotsylvania County	Frederick, Prince of Wales, eldest son of King George II	30,393	10 sq mi (26 km^{2})	State map highlighting Fredericksburg
Galax	640	N/A	November 30, 1953	From Grayson County and Carroll County	Galax shrub (wandplant)	6,670	8 sq mi (21 km^{2})	State map highlighting Galax
Hampton	650	N/A	March 30, 1908	Founded 1610. Current city formed by consolidation of Elizabeth City County and City of Hampton in 1952	Disputed; either Southampton, England or Henry Wriothesley, 3rd Earl of Southampton, one of the founders of the Virginia Company	137,315	52 sq mi (135 km^{2})	State map highlighting Hampton
Harrisonburg	660	N/A	May 6, 1916	From Rockingham County	Thomas Harrison, pioneering settler and town founder	50,839	18 sq mi (47 km^{2})	State map highlighting Harrisonburg
Hopewell	670	N/A	July 1, 1916	From Prince George County	The Hopewell, a ship that carried some of the early English settlers to Virginia	23,261	10 sq mi (26 km^{2})	State map highlighting Hopewell
Lexington	678	N/A	January 1, 1966	From Rockbridge County	Revolutionary War Battle of Lexington	7,769	2.5 sq mi (6 km^{2})	State map highlighting Lexington
Lynchburg	680	N/A	July 10, 1902	From Campbell County	John Lynch, ferry operator and constructor of the first bridge across the James River in the area	81,347	49 sq mi (127 km^{2})	State map highlighting Lynchburg
Manassas	683	N/A	May 1, 1975	From Prince William County	Manassas Gap Railroad	44,332	10 sq mi (26 km^{2})	State map highlighting Manassas
Manassas Park	685	N/A	June 1, 1975	From Prince William County	Manassas Gap Railroad and Manassas National Battlefield Park	16,560	2.5 sq mi (6 km^{2})	State map highlighting Manassas Park
Martinsville	690	N/A	December 5, 1928	From Henry County	Joseph Martin, Revolutionary War general	13,849	11 sq mi (28 km^{2})	State map highlighting Martinsville
Newport News	700	N/A	July 10, 1902	From Warwick County	Captain Christopher Newport, English privateer	183,230	68 sq mi (176 km^{2})	State map highlighting Newport News
Norfolk	710	N/A	July 10, 1902	Founded 1682. Incorporated as City in 1845 from Norfolk County (extinct)	Norfolk, England	231,013	54 sq mi (140 km^{2})	State map highlighting Norfolk
Norton	720	N/A	January 1, 1954	From Wise County	Eckstein Norton, president of the Louisville and Nashville Railroad	3,477	7 sq mi (18 km^{2})	State map highlighting Norton
Petersburg	730	N/A	July 10, 1902	From Prince George and Dinwiddie Counties	Peter Jones, early settler and merchant	33,734	23 sq mi (60 km^{2})	State map highlighting Petersburg
Poquoson	735	N/A	May 1, 1975	From York County	An Eastern Algonquian term. pocosin, roughly translating to "great marsh" or "flat land"	13,292	16 sq mi (41 km^{2})	State map highlighting Poquoson
Portsmouth	740	N/A	July 10, 1902	Founded 1752. Incorporated as City in 1858 from Norfolk County (extinct)	Portsmouth, England	96,777	33 sq mi (85 km^{2})	State map highlighting Portsmouth
Radford	750	N/A	July 10, 1902	From Montgomery County	John Blair Radford, owner of a plantation that included that town's lands	17,243	10 sq mi (26 km^{2})	State map highlighting Radford
Richmond	760	N/A	July 10, 1902	From Henrico County	Richmond, Surrey, England	237,257	60 sq mi (155 km^{2})	State map highlighting Richmond
Roanoke	770	N/A	July 10, 1902	From Roanoke County	Roanoke River	99,111	43 sq mi (111 km^{2})	State map highlighting Roanoke
Salem	775	N/A	January 1, 1968	From Roanoke County	After Salem, New Jersey, home of town founder William Bryan	25,816	15 sq mi (39 km^{2})	State map highlighting Salem
Staunton	790	N/A	July 10, 1902	From Augusta County	Lady Rebecca Staunton, wife of colonial Lieutenant Governor William Gooch	26,801	20 sq mi (52 km^{2})	State map highlighting Staunton
Suffolk	800	N/A	October 1, 1910	Founded 1742. Incorporated as City in 1910 from Nansemond County (extinct)	Suffolk, England	104,699	400 sq mi (1,036 km^{2})	State map highlighting Suffolk
Virginia Beach	810	N/A	February 14, 1952	Founded 1906 around existing community of Seatack. Incorporated as City in 1963 from Princess Anne County (extinct)	The city's coastal location	453,737	248 sq mi (642 km^{2})	State map highlighting Virginia Beach
Waynesboro	820	N/A	January 1, 1948	From Augusta County	Anthony Wayne, Revolutionary War general	23,951	14 sq mi (36 km^{2})	State map highlighting Waynesboro
Williamsburg	830	N/A	July 10, 1902	From James City County	William III of England	15,861	9 sq mi (23 km^{2})	State map highlighting Williamsburg
Winchester	840	N/A	July 10, 1902	From Frederick County	Winchester, England	28,272	9 sq mi (23 km^{2})	State map highlighting Winchester

Top 10 most populated cities in Virginia (2010)	Virginia counties and cities by population density (population/ square mile) in 2015	Virginia counties and cities by population in 2010

== Racial / Ethnic Profile of counties and independent cities in Virginia (2020 Census) ==
Racial / Ethnic Profile of counties in Virginia (2020 Census)
Following is a table of counties in Virginia by race/ethnicity. The majority racial/ethnic group is coded per the key below.

Majority minority with no dominant group
Majority White
Majority Black
Majority Hispanic
Majority Asian

Racial and ethnic composition of counties in Virginia (2020 Census) (NH = Non-Hispanic) Note: the US Census treats Hispanic/Latino as an ethnic category. This table excludes Latinos from the racial categories and assigns them to a separate category. Hispanics/Latinos may be of any race.
County	Location of County	Total Population	White alone (NH)	%	Black or African American alone (NH)	%	Native American or Alaska Native alone (NH)	%	Asian alone (NH)	%	Pacific Islander alone (NH)	%	Other race alone (NH)	%	Mixed race or Multiracial (NH)	%	Hispanic or Latino (any race)	%
Accomack		33,413	19,825	59.33%	8,639	25.86%	65	0.19%	249	0.75%	1	0.00%	99	0.30%	1,105	3.31%	3,430	10.27%
Albemarle		112,395	80,335	71.48%	9,793	8.71%	96	0.09%	8,186	7.28%	44	0.04%	604	0.54%	4,884	4.35%	8,453	7.52%
Alleghany		15,223	13,754	90.35%	676	4.44%	22	0.14%	59	0.39%	7	0.05%	24	0.16%	503	3.30%	178	1.17%
Amelia		13,265	9,687	73.03%	2,546	19.19%	18	0.14%	63	0.48%	0	0.00%	50	0.38%	476	3.59%	425	3.20%
Amherst		31,307	22,967	73.36%	5,346	17.08%	243	0.78%	182	0.58%	25	0.08%	145	0.46%	1,561	4.99%	838	2.68%
Appomattox		16,119	12,155	75.41%	2,877	17.85%	50	0.31%	42	0.26%	3	0.02%	84	0.52%	564	3.50%	344	2.13%
Arlington		238,643	139,653	58.52%	20,330	8.52%	258	0.11%	27,235	11.41%	118	0.05%	1,491	0.62%	12,196	5.11%	37,362	15.66%
Augusta		77,487	68,375	88.24%	3,072	3.96%	130	0.17%	461	0.59%	27	0.03%	198	0.26%	2,496	3.22%	2,728	3.52%
Bath		4,209	3,841	91.26%	114	2.71%	3	0.07%	17	0.40%	1	0.02%	4	0.10%	156	3.71%	73	1.73%
Bedford		79,462	68,128	85.74%	4,864	6.12%	167	0.21%	967	1.22%	33	0.04%	329	0.41%	2,919	3.67%	2,055	2.59%
Bland		6,270	5,857	93.41%	167	2.66%	0	0.00%	4	0.06%	0	0.00%	5	0.08%	177	2.82%	60	0.96%
Botetourt		33,596	30,506	90.80%	905	2.69%	43	0.13%	234	0.70%	3	0.01%	102	0.30%	1,027	3.06%	776	2.31%
Brunswick		15,849	6,457	40.74%	8,573	54.09%	23	0.15%	42	0.26%	5	0.03%	29	0.18%	333	2.10%	387	2.44%
Buchanan		20,355	19,210	94.37%	613	3.01%	15	0.07%	49	0.24%	1	0.00%	10	0.05%	280	1.38%	177	0.87%
Buckingham		16,824	10,314	61.31%	5,390	32.04%	44	0.26%	59	0.35%	0	0.00%	52	0.31%	552	3.28%	413	2.46%
Campbell		55,696	42,884	76.99%	7,761	13.93%	169	0.30%	601	1.08%	8	0.01%	241	0.43%	2,217	3.98%	1,815	3.26%
Caroline		30,887	18,841	61.00%	7,627	24.69%	160	0.52%	296	0.96%	15	0.05%	163	0.53%	1,817	5.88%	1,968	6.37%
Carroll		29,155	27,040	92.75%	163	0.56%	35	0.12%	80	0.27%	3	0.01%	42	0.14%	750	2.57%	1,042	3.57%
Charles City		6,773	2,997	44.25%	2,836	41.87%	441	6.51%	34	0.50%	6	0.09%	50	0.74%	308	4.55%	101	1.49%
Charlotte		11,529	7,677	66.59%	3,140	27.24%	18	0.16%	23	0.20%	6	0.05%	35	0.30%	377	3.27%	253	2.19%
Chesterfield		364,548	210,881	57.85%	81,492	22.35%	848	0.23%	13,096	3.59%	177	0.05%	2,098	0.58%	15,720	4.31%	40,236	11.04%
Clarke		14,783	12,309	83.26%	564	3.82%	33	0.22%	210	1.42%	15	0.10%	89	0.60%	676	4.57%	887	6.00%
Craig		4,892	4,631	94.66%	11	0.22%	5	0.10%	11	0.22%	3	0.06%	12	0.25%	166	3.39%	53	1.08%
Culpeper		52,552	34,840	66.30%	6,453	12.28%	110	0.21%	767	1.46%	20	0.04%	233	0.44%	2,620	4.99%	7,509	14.29%
Cumberland		9,675	6,104	63.09%	2,817	29.12%	39	0.40%	36	0.37%	8	0.08%	40	0.41%	390	4.03%	241	2.49%
Dickenson		14,124	13,691	96.93%	48	0.34%	22	0.16%	12	0.08%	2	0.01%	12	0.08%	254	1.80%	83	0.59%
Dinwiddie		27,947	17,346	62.07%	8,115	29.04%	91	0.33%	119	0.43%	3	0.01%	102	0.36%	1,043	3.73%	1,128	4.04%
Essex		10,599	5,871	55.39%	3,743	35.31%	61	0.58%	62	0.59%	3	0.03%	40	0.38%	450	4.25%	369	3.48%
Fairfax		1,150,309	542,001	47.12%	108,339	9.42%	1,437	0.12%	233,858	20.33%	772	0.07%	7,046	0.61%	57,622	5.01%	199,234	17.32%
Fauquier		72,972	54,969	75.33%	4,999	6.85%	128	0.18%	1,204	1.65%	49	0.07%	339	0.46%	3,491	4.78%	7,793	10.68%
Floyd		15,476	14,114	91.20%	234	1.51%	18	0.12%	46	0.30%	0	0.00%	72	0.47%	505	3.26%	487	3.15%
Fluvanna		27,249	20,760	76.19%	3,669	13.47%	68	0.25%	212	0.78%	7	0.03%	155	0.57%	1,271	4.66%	1,107	4.06%
Franklin		54,477	46,218	84.84%	3,848	7.06%	75	0.14%	303	0.56%	20	0.04%	153	0.28%	1,905	3.50%	1,955	3.59%
Frederick		91,419	71,739	78.47%	3,605	3.94%	120	0.13%	1,661	1.82%	39	0.04%	402	0.44%	3,863	4.23%	9,990	10.93%
Giles		16,787	15,673	93.36%	238	1.42%	28	0.17%	69	0.41%	0	0.00%	19	0.11%	516	3.07%	244	1.45%
Gloucester		38,711	31,974	82.60%	2,706	6.99%	129	0.33%	305	0.79%	21	0.05%	143	0.37%	2,023	5.23%	1,410	3.64%
Goochland		24,727	19,081	77.17%	3,852	15.58%	58	0.23%	493	1.99%	3	0.01%	146	0.59%	832	3.36%	862	3.49%
Grayson		15,333	13,396	87.37%	887	5.78%	26	0.17%	24	0.16%	2	0.01%	30	0.20%	372	2.43%	596	3.89%
Greene		20,552	16,214	78.89%	1,442	7.02%	26	0.13%	456	2.22%	4	0.02%	92	0.45%	988	4.81%	1,330	6.47%
Greensville		11,391	4,217	37.02%	6,616	58.08%	19	0.17%	32	0.28%	0	0.00%	13	0.11%	218	1.91%	276	2.42%
Halifax		34,022	20,250	59.52%	11,738	34.50%	77	0.23%	218	0.64%	3	0.01%	112	0.33%	864	2.54%	760	2.23%
Hanover		109,979	88,869	80.81%	9,678	8.80%	311	0.28%	2,021	1.84%	32	0.03%	510	0.46%	4,620	4.20%	3,938	3.58%
Henrico		334,389	167,030	49.95%	96,332	28.81%	888	0.27%	32,175	9.62%	127	0.04%	1,955	0.58%	13,797	4.13%	22,085	6.61%
Henry		50,948	34,307	67.34%	11,062	21.71%	68	0.13%	284	0.56%	6	0.01%	153	0.30%	1,767	3.47%	3,301	6.48%
Highland		2,232	2,132	95.52%	2	0.09%	1	0.04%	6	0.27%	1	0.04%	8	0.36%	47	2.11%	35	1.57%
Isle of Wight		38,606	26,410	68.41%	8,579	22.22%	139	0.36%	391	1.01%	31	0.08%	202	0.52%	1,655	4.29%	1,199	3.11%
James City		78,254	56,647	72.39%	9,832	12.56%	165	0.21%	2,254	2.88%	48	0.06%	361	0.46%	3,748	4.79%	5,199	6.64%
King and Queen		6,608	4,460	67.49%	1,561	23.62%	82	1.24%	23	0.35%	3	0.05%	19	0.29%	278	4.21%	182	2.75%
King George		26,723	18,709	70.01%	3,919	14.67%	153	0.57%	401	1.50%	13	0.05%	147	0.55%	1,799	6.73%	1,582	5.92%
King William		17,810	13,499	75.79%	2,585	14.51%	277	1.56%	129	0.72%	9	0.05%	76	0.43%	759	4.26%	476	2.67%
Lancaster		10,919	7,441	68.15%	2,946	26.98%	14	0.13%	77	0.71%	1	0.01%	39	0.36%	276	2.53%	125	1.14%
Lee		22,173	20,193	91.07%	868	3.91%	69	0.31%	39	0.18%	0	0.00%	33	0.15%	495	2.23%	476	2.15%
Loudoun		420,959	216,865	51.52%	29,725	7.06%	536	0.13%	89,372	21.23%	227	0.05%	2,425	0.58%	22,065	5.24%	59,744	14.19%
Louisa		37,596	28,535	75.90%	5,365	14.27%	93	0.25%	251	0.67%	18	0.05%	155	0.41%	1,814	4.82%	1,365	3.63%
Lunenburg		11,936	7,016	58.78%	3,773	31.61%	32	0.27%	25	0.21%	5	0.04%	31	0.26%	465	3.90%	589	4.93%
Madison		13,837	11,563	83.57%	1,056	7.63%	14	0.10%	86	0.62%	1	0.01%	53	0.38%	623	4.50%	441	3.19%
Mathews		8,533	7,250	84.96%	658	7.71%	7	0.08%	49	0.57%	15	0.18%	25	0.29%	332	3.89%	197	2.31%
Mecklenburg		30,319	17,864	58.92%	10,364	34.18%	73	0.24%	205	0.68%	0	0.00%	110	0.36%	882	2.91%	821	2.71%
Middlesex		10,625	8,339	78.48%	1,519	14.30%	24	0.23%	26	0.24%	3	0.03%	40	0.38%	415	3.91%	259	2.44%
Montgomery		99,721	77,918	78.14%	4,054	4.07%	126	0.13%	8,310	8.33%	45	0.05%	307	0.31%	4,310	4.32%	4,651	4.66%
Nelson		14,775	11,879	80.40%	1,526	10.33%	47	0.32%	67	0.45%	2	0.01%	68	0.46%	523	3.54%	663	4.49%
New Kent		22,945	17,818	77.66%	2,714	11.83%	225	0.98%	223	0.97%	8	0.03%	102	0.44%	1,124	4.90%	731	3.19%
Northampton		12,282	6,932	56.44%	3,756	30.58%	58	0.47%	80	0.65%	8	0.07%	30	0.24%	350	2.85%	1,068	8.70%
Northumberland		11,839	8,310	70.19%	2,673	22.58%	14	0.12%	67	0.57%	0	0.00%	59	0.50%	365	3.08%	351	2.96%
Nottoway		15,642	8,452	54.03%	5,773	36.91%	50	0.32%	64	0.41%	3	0.02%	72	0.46%	455	2.91%	773	4.94%
Orange		36,254	27,389	75.55%	4,304	11.87%	92	0.25%	311	0.86%	18	0.05%	156	0.43%	1,813	5.00%	2,171	5.99%
Page		23,709	21,870	92.24%	436	1.84%	49	0.21%	115	0.49%	8	0.03%	40	0.17%	694	2.93%	497	2.10%
Patrick		17,608	15,577	88.47%	831	4.72%	24	0.14%	43	0.24%	3	0.02%	72	0.41%	491	2.79%	567	3.22%
Pittsylvania		60,501	44,277	73.18%	12,354	20.42%	93	0.15%	289	0.48%	17	0.03%	128	0.21%	1,631	2.70%	1,712	2.83%
Powhatan		30,333	25,497	84.06%	2,477	8.17%	59	0.19%	167	0.55%	18	0.06%	99	0.33%	1,224	4.03%	792	2.61%
Prince Edward		21,849	10,513	48.12%	9,194	42.08%	33	0.15%	196	0.90%	0	0.00%	61	0.28%	764	3.50%	1,088	4.98%
Prince George		43,010	22,662	52.69%	12,694	29.51%	221	0.51%	822	1.91%	141	0.33%	191	0.44%	1,935	4.50%	4,344	10.10%
Prince William		482,204	185,048	38.38%	94,939	19.69%	745	0.15%	49,836	10.34%	507	0.11%	3,384	0.70%	26,221	5.44%	121,524	25.20%
Pulaski		33,800	29,716	87.92%	1,633	4.83%	49	0.14%	177	0.52%	3	0.01%	100	0.30%	1,418	4.20%	704	2.08%
Rappahannock		7,348	6,444	87.70%	198	2.69%	17	0.23%	63	0.86%	0	0.00%	30	0.41%	307	4.18%	289	3.93%
Richmond		8,923	5,564	62.36%	2,419	27.11%	16	0.18%	42	0.47%	0	0.00%	5	0.06%	280	3.14%	597	6.69%
Roanoke		96,929	79,928	82.46%	5,650	5.83%	155	0.16%	3,425	3.53%	24	0.02%	435	0.45%	3,805	3.93%	3,507	3.62%
Rockbridge		22,650	20,357	89.88%	565	2.49%	85	0.38%	181	0.80%	6	0.03%	82	0.36%	861	3.80%	513	2.27%
Rockingham		83,757	71,367	85.21%	1,768	2.11%	80	0.10%	920	1.10%	9	0.01%	243	0.29%	2,277	2.72%	7,093	8.47%
Russell		25,781	24,754	96.02%	222	0.86%	17	0.07%	42	0.16%	1	0.00%	25	0.10%	552	2.14%	168	0.65%
Scott		21,576	20,528	95.14%	134	0.62%	26	0.12%	20	0.09%	2	0.01%	28	0.13%	583	2.70%	255	1.18%
Shenandoah		44,186	37,304	84.42%	1,031	2.33%	84	0.19%	344	0.78%	8	0.02%	149	0.34%	1,540	3.49%	3,726	8.43%
Smyth		29,800	27,762	93.16%	408	1.37%	36	0.12%	104	0.35%	1	0.00%	49	0.16%	882	2.96%	558	1.87%
Southampton		17,996	10,959	60.90%	5,908	32.83%	56	0.31%	67	0.37%	20	0.11%	50	0.28%	604	3.36%	332	1.84%
Spotsylvania		140,032	87,278	62.33%	22,436	16.02%	375	0.27%	3,933	2.81%	122	0.09%	845	0.60%	8,389	5.99%	16,654	11.89%
Stafford		156,927	85,587	54.54%	29,492	18.79%	601	0.38%	6,137	3.91%	241	0.15%	1,105	0.70%	10,118	6.45%	23,646	15.07%
Surry		6,561	3,459	52.72%	2,687	40.95%	17	0.26%	14	0.21%	10	0.15%	15	0.23%	210	3.20%	149	2.27%
Sussex		10,829	4,381	40.46%	5,766	53.25%	14	0.13%	11	0.10%	7	0.06%	25	0.23%	319	2.95%	306	2.83%
Tazewell		40,429	37,336	92.35%	961	2.38%	56	0.14%	213	0.53%	15	0.04%	89	0.22%	1,252	3.10%	507	1.25%
Warren		40,727	33,831	83.07%	1,722	4.23%	130	0.32%	462	1.13%	13	0.03%	255	0.63%	1,901	4.67%	2,413	5.92%
Washington		53,935	50,338	93.33%	651	1.21%	91	0.17%	334	0.62%	0	0.00%	134	0.25%	1,496	2.77%	891	1.65%
Westmoreland		18,477	11,758	63.64%	4,470	24.19%	67	0.36%	146	0.79%	11	0.06%	68	0.37%	908	4.91%	1,049	5.68%
Wise		36,130	32,586	90.19%	1,771	4.90%	48	0.13%	150	0.42%	11	0.03%	86	0.24%	1,026	2.84%	452	1.25%
Wythe		28,290	26,082	92.19%	699	2.47%	54	0.19%	118	0.42%	2	0.01%	66	0.23%	914	3.23%	355	1.25%
York		70,045	46,932	67.00%	8,633	12.33%	168	0.24%	4,251	6.07%	127	0.18%	416	0.59%	4,382	6.26%	5,136	7.33%
Alexandria (independent city)		159,467	78,519	49.24%	31,314	19.64%	217	0.14%	11,205	7.03%	77	0.05%	1,026	0.64%	7,737	4.85%	29,372	18.42%
Bristol (independent city)		17,219	14,652	85.09%	1,008	5.85%	55	0.32%	159	0.92%	4	0.02%	36	0.21%	850	4.94%	455	2.64%
Buena Vista (independent city)		6,641	5,660	85.23%	289	4.35%	39	0.59%	24	0.36%	24	0.36%	18	0.27%	358	5.39%	229	3.45%
Charlottesville (independent city)		46,553	29,609	63.60%	7,030	15.10%	66	0.14%	4,064	8.73%	18	0.04%	218	0.47%	2,341	5.03%	3,207	6.89%
Chesapeake (independent city)		249,422	135,679	54.40%	70,885	28.42%	731	0.29%	8,868	3.56%	312	0.13%	1,223	0.49%	13,900	5.57%	17,824	7.15%
Colonial Heights (independent city)		18,170	12,409	68.29%	2,848	15.67%	32	0.18%	569	3.13%	13	0.07%	85	0.47%	938	5.16%	1,276	7.02%
Covington (independent city)		5,737	4,541	79.15%	716	12.48%	12	0.21%	32	0.56%	5	0.09%	11	0.19%	241	4.20%	179	3.12%
Danville (independent city)		42,590	16,884	39.64%	21,733	51.03%	88	0.21%	503	1.18%	1	0.00%	143	0.34%	1,164	2.73%	2,074	4.87%
Emporia (independent city)		5,766	1,529	26.52%	3,631	62.97%	7	0.12%	50	0.87%	4	0.07%	37	0.64%	163	2.83%	345	5.98%
Fairfax (independent city)		24,146	12,911	53.47%	1,052	4.36%	44	0.18%	4,519	18.72%	9	0.04%	204	0.84%	1,129	4.68%	4,278	17.72%
Falls Church (independent city)		14,658	9,955	67.91%	554	3.78%	12	0.08%	1,494	10.19%	10	0.07%	117	0.80%	987	6.73%	1,529	10.43%
Franklin (independent city)		8,180	2,966	36.26%	4,610	56.36%	25	0.31%	81	0.99%	2	0.02%	16	0.20%	262	3.20%	218	2.66%
Fredericksburg (independent city)		27,982	15,201	54.32%	5,956	21.29%	86	0.31%	1,325	4.73%	24	0.09%	280	1.00%	1,638	5.85%	3,472	12.41%
Galax (independent city)		6,720	4,975	74.03%	354	5.27%	13	0.19%	52	0.77%	0	0.00%	15	0.22%	250	3.72%	1,061	15.79%
Hampton (independent city)		137,148	49,389	36.01%	66,632	48.58%	485	0.35%	3,493	2.55%	209	0.15%	895	0.65%	7,634	5.57%	8,411	6.13%
Harrisonburg (independent city)		51,814	31,454	60.71%	3,906	7.54%	71	0.14%	2,089	4.03%	20	0.04%	196	0.38%	2,033	3.92%	12,045	23.25%
Hopewell (independent city)		23,033	9,819	42.63%	9,689	42.07%	86	0.37%	251	1.09%	15	0.07%	129	0.56%	1,155	5.01%	1,889	8.20%
Lexington (independent city)		7,320	6,015	82.17%	454	6.20%	8	0.11%	281	3.84%	0	0.00%	23	0.31%	204	2.79%	335	4.58%
Lynchburg (independent city)		79,009	47,654	60.32%	21,228	26.87%	200	0.25%	1,752	2.22%	34	0.04%	669	0.85%	3,592	4.55%	3,880	4.91%
Manassas (independent city)		42,772	14,816	34.64%	4,914	11.49%	65	0.15%	2,703	6.32%	19	0.04%	317	0.74%	1,593	3.72%	18,345	42.89%
Manassas Park (independent city)		17,219	4,706	27.33%	2,076	12.06%	27	0.16%	1,827	10.61%	13	0.08%	133	0.77%	638	3.71%	7,799	45.29%
Martinsville (independent city)		13,485	5,732	42.51%	6,043	44.81%	23	0.17%	116	0.86%	4	0.03%	46	0.34%	496	3.68%	1,025	7.60%
Newport News (independent city)		186,247	71,250	38.26%	76,870	41.27%	571	0.31%	6,230	3.34%	404	0.22%	1,124	0.60%	10,510	5.64%	19,288	10.36%
Norfolk (independent city)		238,005	97,205	40.84%	93,553	39.31%	832	0.35%	8,828	3.71%	475	0.20%	1,331	0.56%	12,651	5.32%	23,130	9.72%
Norton (independent city)		3,687	3,223	87.42%	179	4.85%	4	0.11%	27	0.73%	0	0.00%	14	0.38%	159	4.31%	81	2.20%
Petersburg (independent city)		33,458	5,178	15.48%	24,530	73.32%	105	0.31%	330	0.99%	30	0.09%	190	0.57%	1,125	3.36%	1,970	5.89%
Poquoson (independent city)		12,460	10,937	87.78%	107	0.86%	33	0.26%	253	2.03%	2	0.02%	67	0.54%	598	4.80%	463	3.72%
Portsmouth (independent city)		97,915	34,912	35.66%	51,586	52.68%	355	0.36%	1,244	1.27%	134	0.14%	490	0.50%	4,781	4.88%	4,413	4.51%
Radford (independent city)		16,070	12,006	74.71%	2,125	13.22%	30	0.19%	210	1.31%	0	0.00%	269	1.67%	665	4.14%	765	4.76%
Richmond (independent city)		226,610	95,220	42.02%	90,490	39.93%	440	0.19%	6,199	2.74%	69	0.03%	1,378	0.61%	9,067	4.00%	23,747	10.48%
Roanoke (independent city)		100,011	55,951	55.94%	27,077	27.07%	211	0.21%	2,462	2.46%	42	0.04%	523	0.52%	5,261	5.26%	8,484	8.48%
Salem (independent city)		25,346	20,673	81.56%	1,913	7.55%	42	0.17%	534	2.11%	5	0.02%	66	0.26%	1,025	4.04%	1,088	4.29%
Staunton (independent city)		25,750	19,959	77.51%	2,882	11.19%	65	0.25%	320	1.24%	11	0.04%	155	0.60%	1,270	4.93%	1,088	4.23%
Suffolk (independent city)		94,324	43,837	46.47%	39,194	41.55%	255	0.27%	1,672	1.77%	68	0.07%	543	0.58%	4,503	4.77%	4,252	4.51%
Virginia Beach (independent city)		459,470	269,566	58.67%	82,583	17.97%	1,184	0.26%	33,756	7.35%	671	0.15%	2,599	0.57%	28,707	6.25%	40,404	8.79%
Waynesboro (independent city)		22,196	16,074	72.42%	2,610	11.76%	33	0.15%	258	1.16%	20	0.09%	104	0.47%	1,152	5.19%	1,945	8.76%
Williamsburg (independent city)		15,425	7,370	47.78%	5,648	36.62%	20	0.13%	497	3.22%	25	0.16%	53	0.34%	597	3.87%	1,215	7.88%
Winchester (independent city)		28,120	17,623	62.67%	2,800	9.96%	66	0.23%	700	2.49%	14	0.05%	135	0.48%	1,288	4.58%	5,494	19.54%

== Smithsonian trinomial abbreviations ==
=== List of county abbreviations ===
The counties have the following Smithsonian trinomial abbreviations:

Code	County name	Code	County name	Code	County name	Code	County name
AC	Accomack	CU	Cumberland	KQ	King and Queen	PU	Pulaski
AG	Alleghany	DK	Dickenson	KW	King William	PW	Prince William
AH	Amherst	DW	Dinwiddie	LA	Lancaster	RA	Rappahannock
AL	Albemarle	ES	Essex	LE	Lee	RB	Rockbridge
AM	Amelia	FD	Frederick	LD	Loudoun	RC	Richmond
AP	Appomattox	FL	Floyd	LO	Louisa	RH	Rockingham
AR	Arlington County	FQ	Fauquier	LU	Lunenburg	RO	Roanoke
AU	Augusta	FR	Franklin	MA	Madison	RU	Russell
BA	Bath	FV	Fluvanna	MI	Middlesex	SC	Scott
BD	Bedford	FX	Fairfax	MK	Mecklenburg	SH	Shenandoah
BK	Buckingham	GI	Giles	MO	Montgomery	SM	Smyth
BL	Bland	GL	Gloucester	MT	Mathews	SO	Southampton
BO	Botetourt	GO	Goochland	NK	New Kent	SP	Spotsylvania
BR	Brunswick	GR	Greene	NL	Nelson	ST	Stafford
BU	Buchanan	GV	Greensville	NO	Northampton	SU	Surry
CA	Carroll	GY	Grayson	NT	Nottoway	SX	Sussex
CB	Campbell	HE	Henry	NU	Northumberland	TZ	Tazewell
CC	Charles City	HI	Highland	OR	Orange	WA	Washington
CG	Craig	HN	Hanover	PA	Page	WE	Westmoreland
CH	Chesterfield	HR	Henrico	PE	Prince Edward	WI	Wise
CK	Clarke	HX	Halifax	PG	Prince George	WR	Warren
CL	Caroline	IW	Isle of Wight	PK	Patrick	WY	Wythe
CP	Culpeper	JC	James City	PO	Powhatan	YO	York
CR	Charlotte	KG	King George	PT	Pittsylvania		

=== List of independent city abbreviations ===
The independent cities have the following Smithsonian trinomial abbreviations:

Code	City name	Code	City name	Code	City name	Code	City name
ALX	Alexandria	BRI	Bristol	BVA	Buena Vista	CHA	Charlottesville
CHE	Chesapeake	CHS	Colonial Heights	COV	Covington	DAN	Danville
EMP	Emporia	FAX	Fairfax	FAL	Falls Church	FRK	Franklin
FRD	Fredericksburg	GAL	Galax	HAM	Hampton	HAR	Harrisonburg
HOP	Hopewell	LEX	Lexington	LYN	Lynchburg	MAN	Manassas
MAP	Manassas Park	MAR	Martinsville	NN	Newport News	NOR	Norfolk
NRT	Norton	PET	Petersburg	POQ	Poquoson	POR	Portsmouth
RAD	Radford	RIC	Richmond	ROA	Roanoke	SAL	Salem
STA	Staunton	SUF	Suffolk	VAB	Virginia Beach	WAY	Waynesboro
WIL	Williamsburg	WIN	Winchester				

== Gallery ==
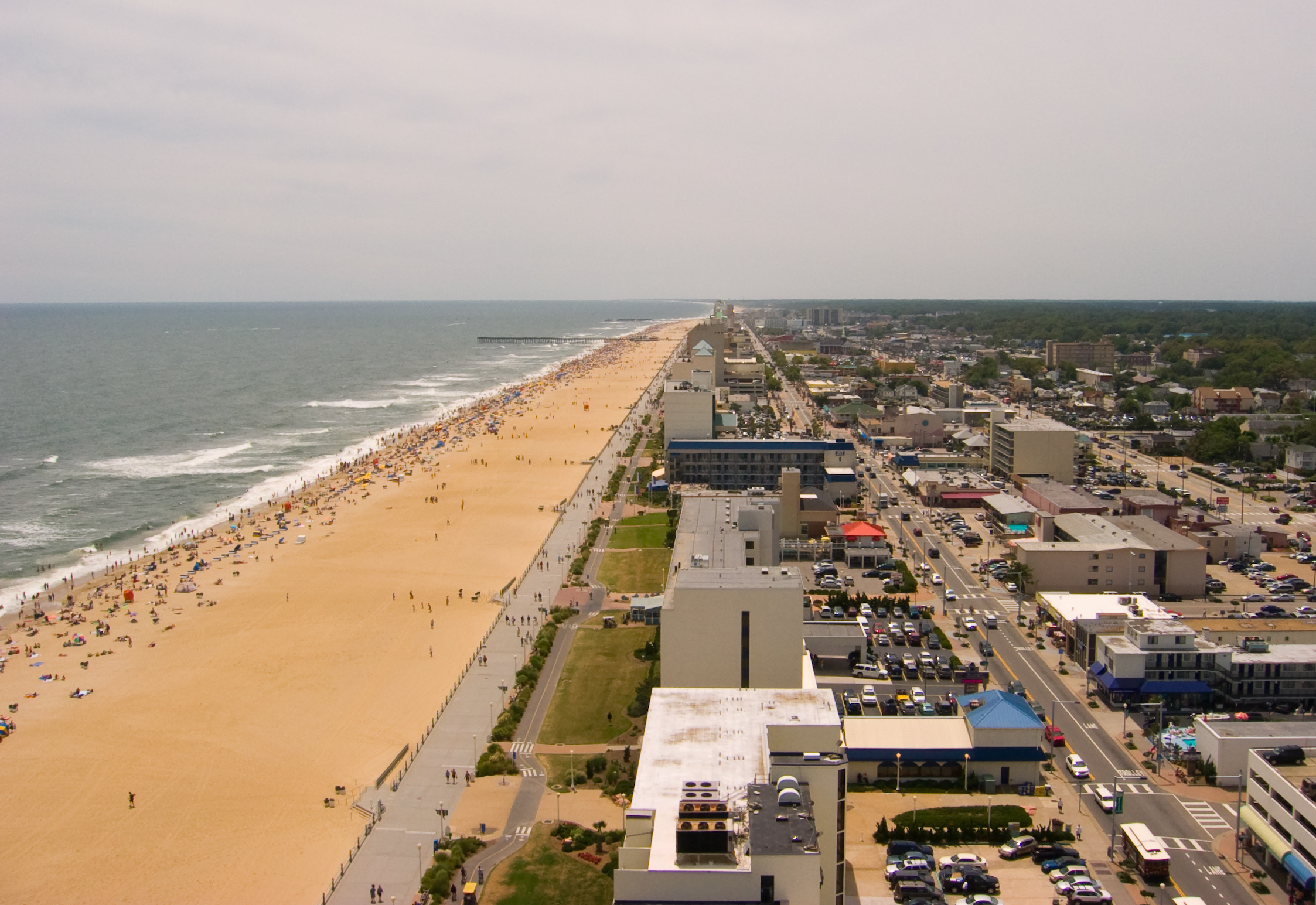
Virginia Beach, the largest city in Virginia

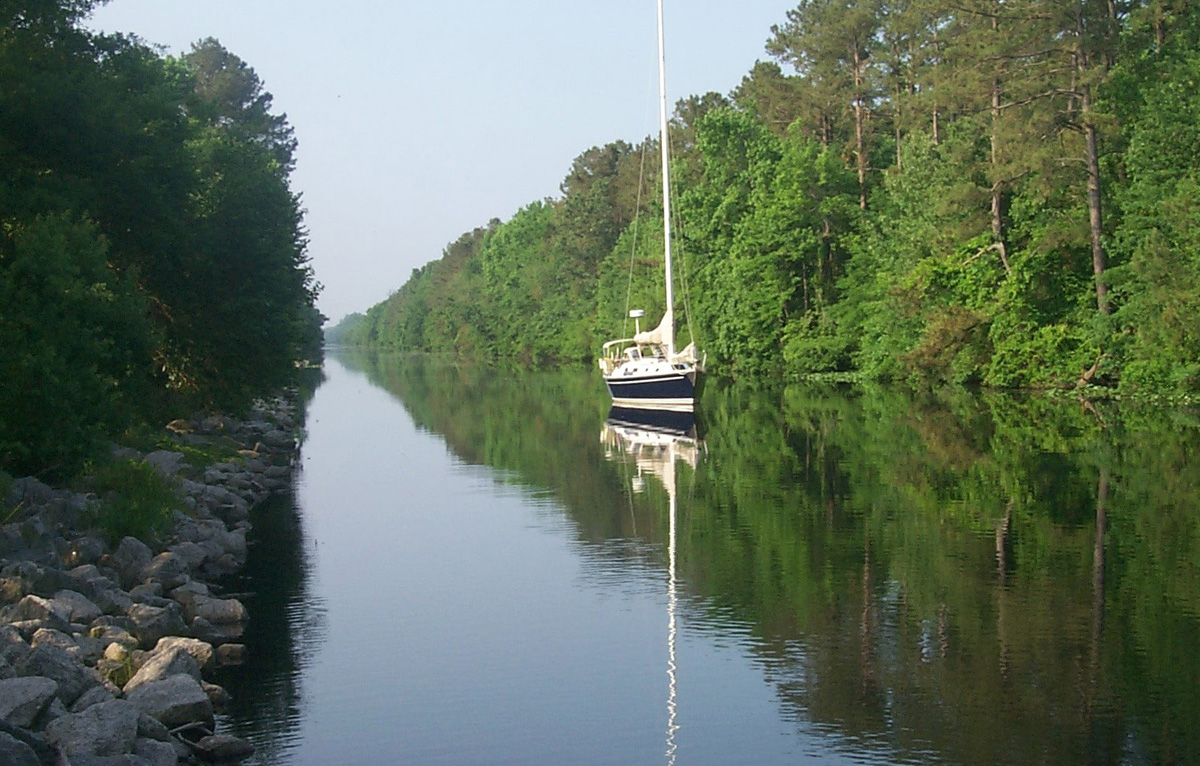
Chesapeake, the second-largest city

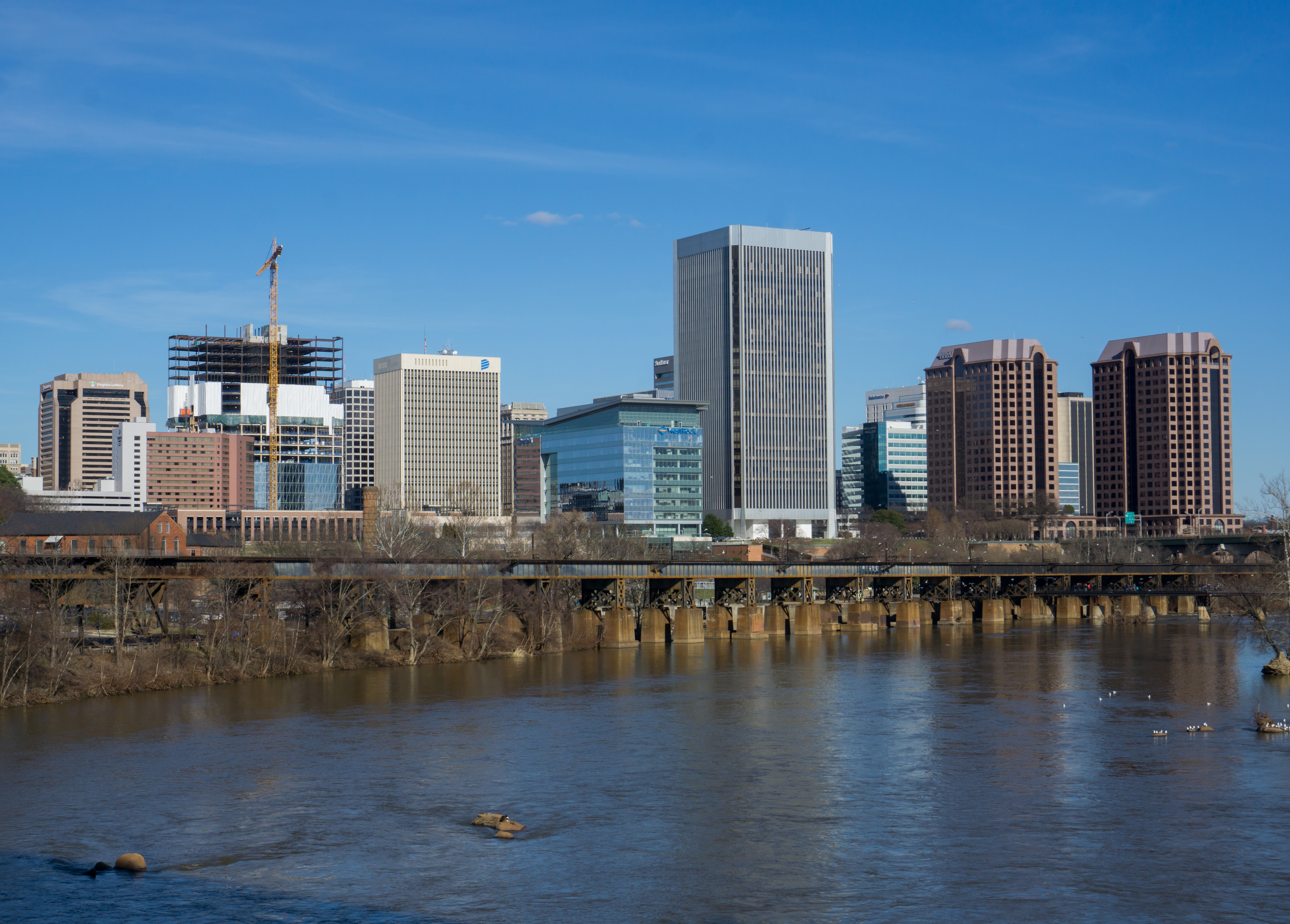
Richmond, the capital and third-largest city

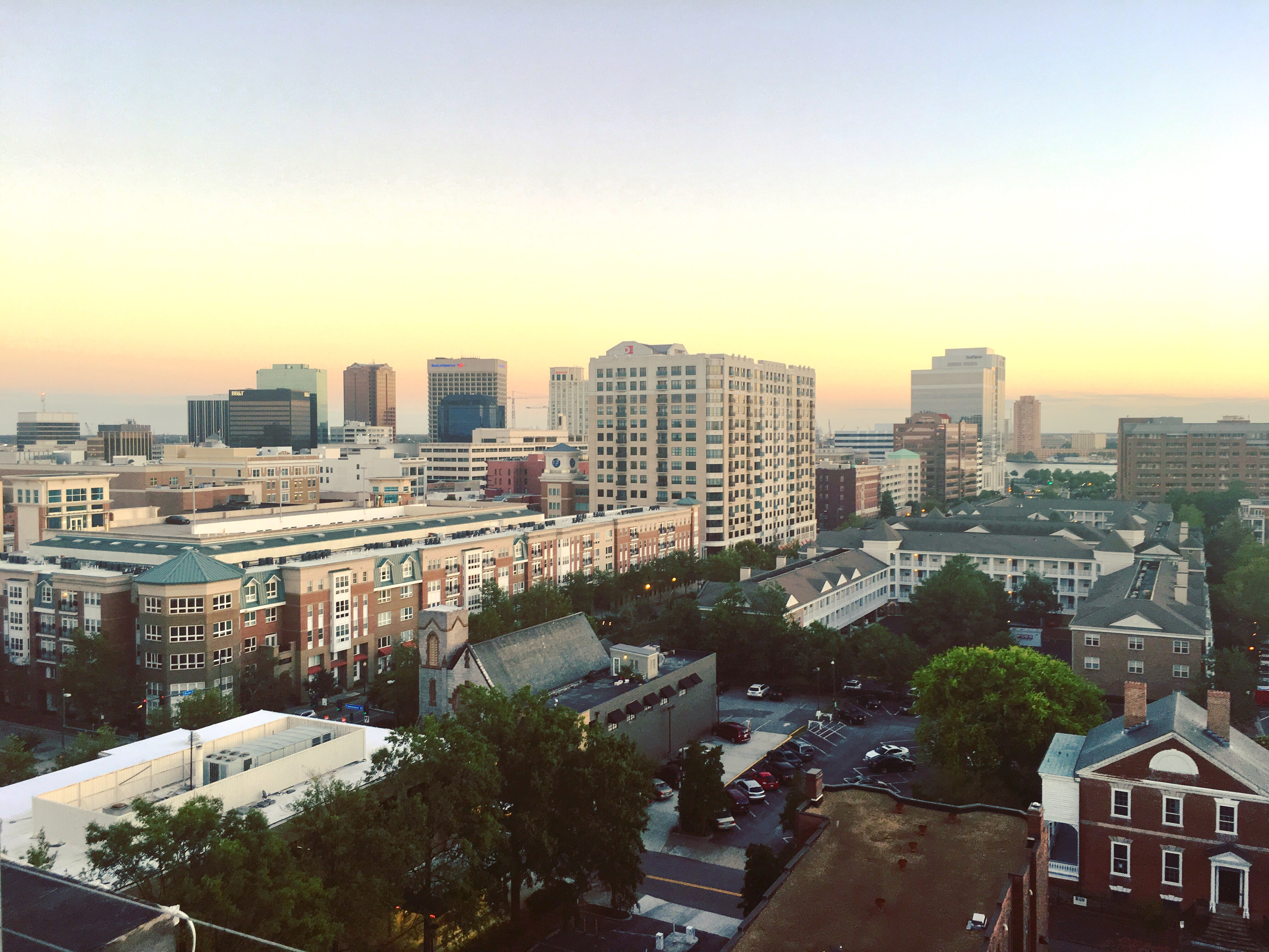
Norfolk, the fourth-largest city

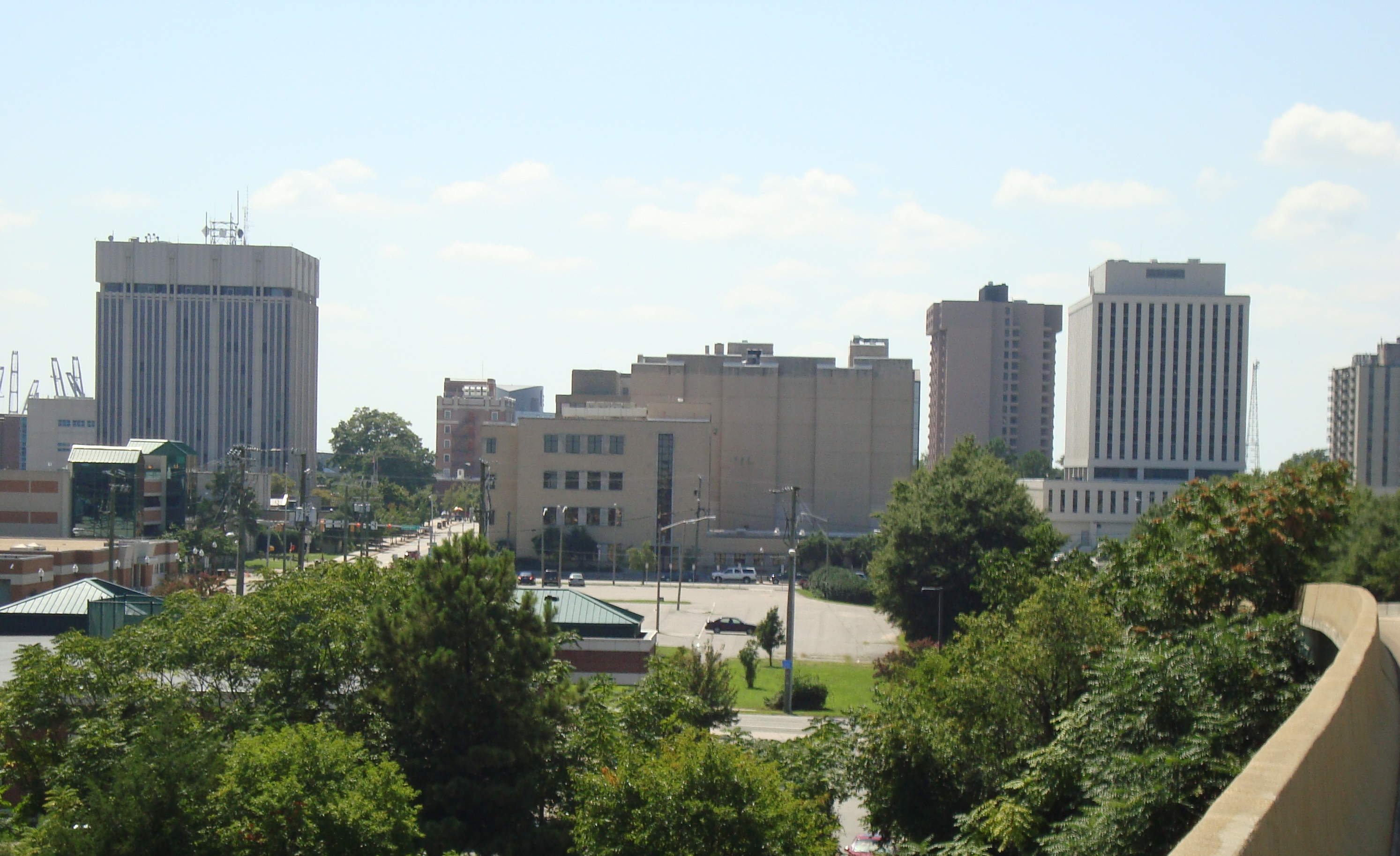
Newport News, the fifth-largest

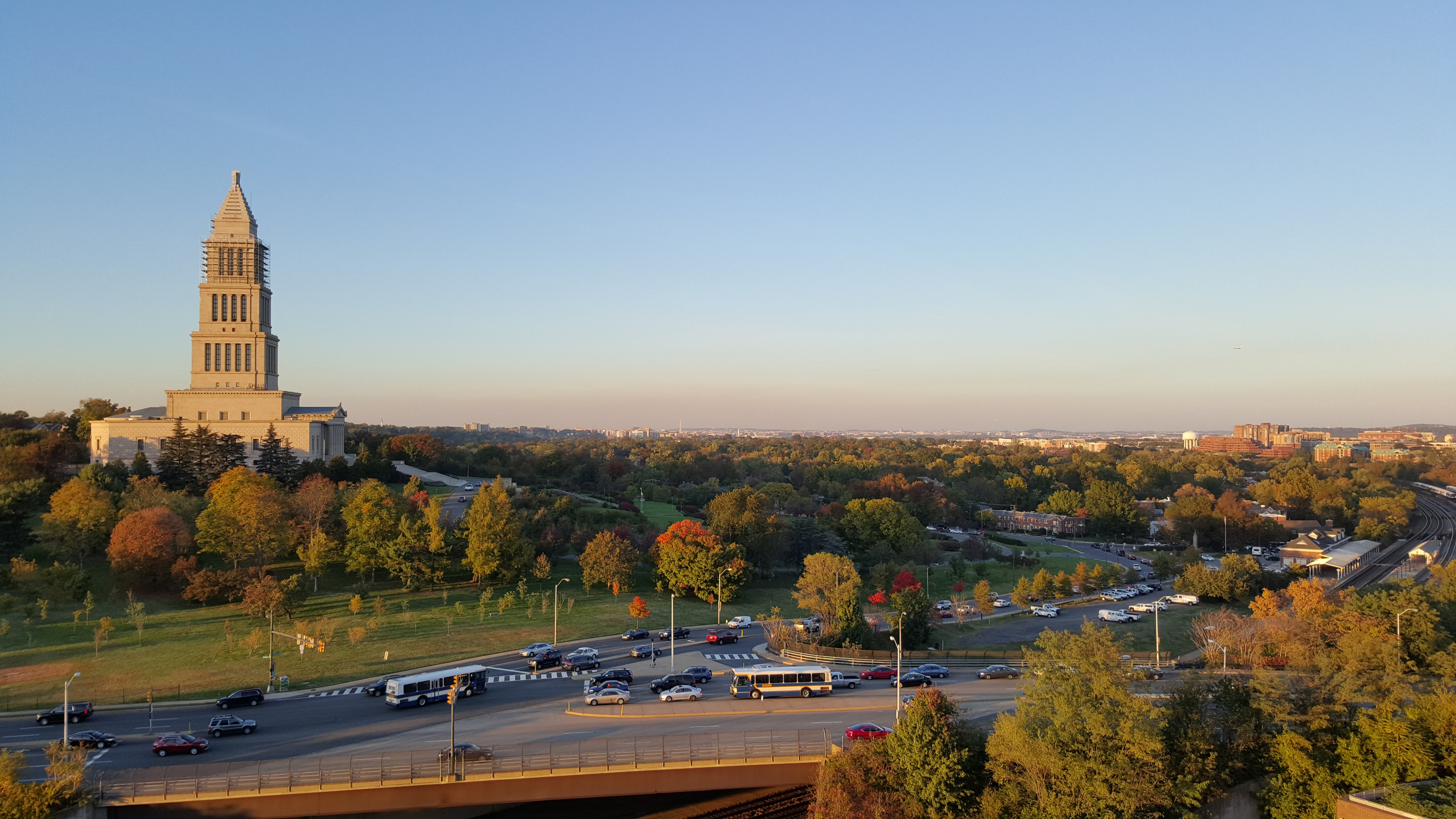
Alexandria, the sixth-largest

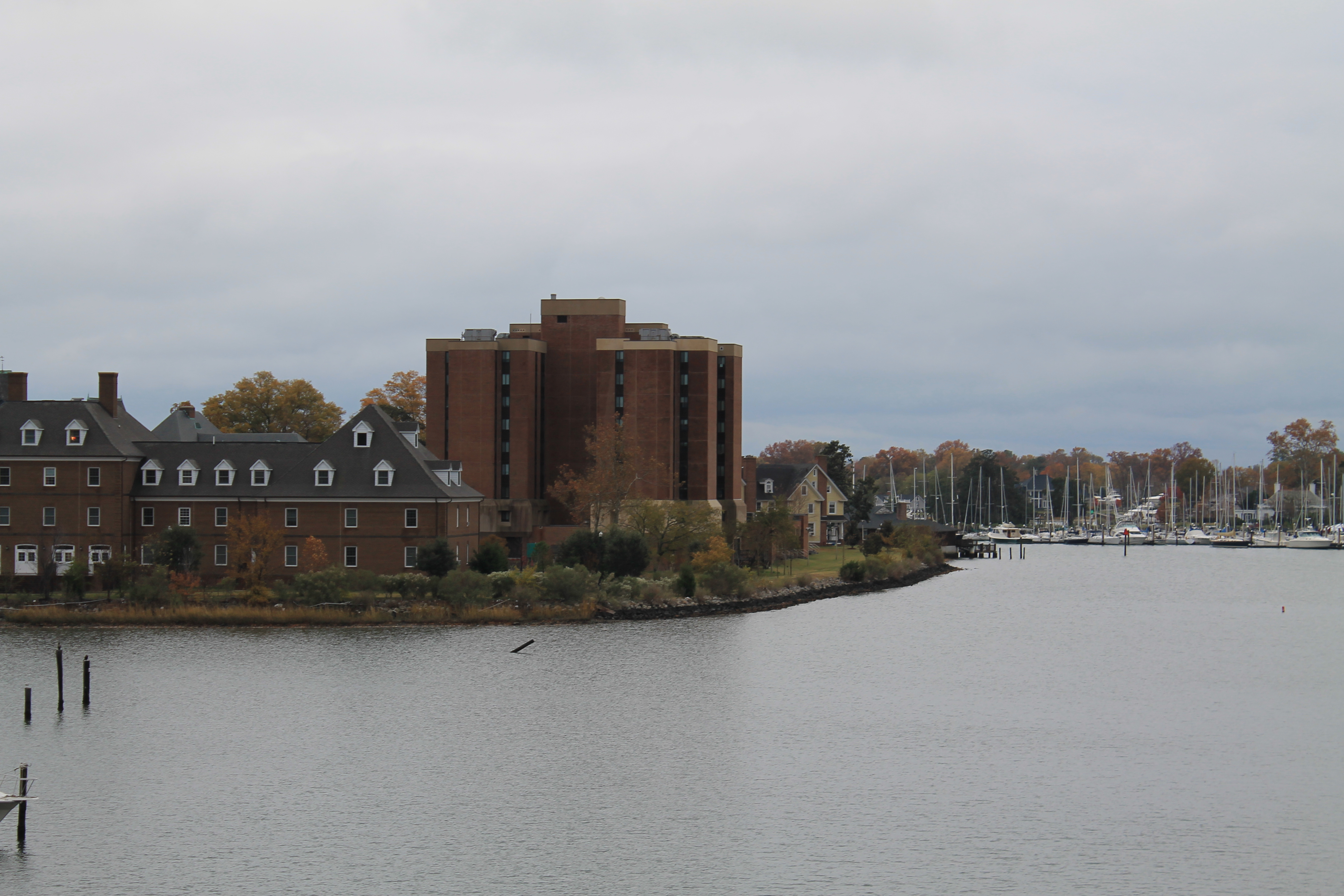
Hampton, the seventh-largest city

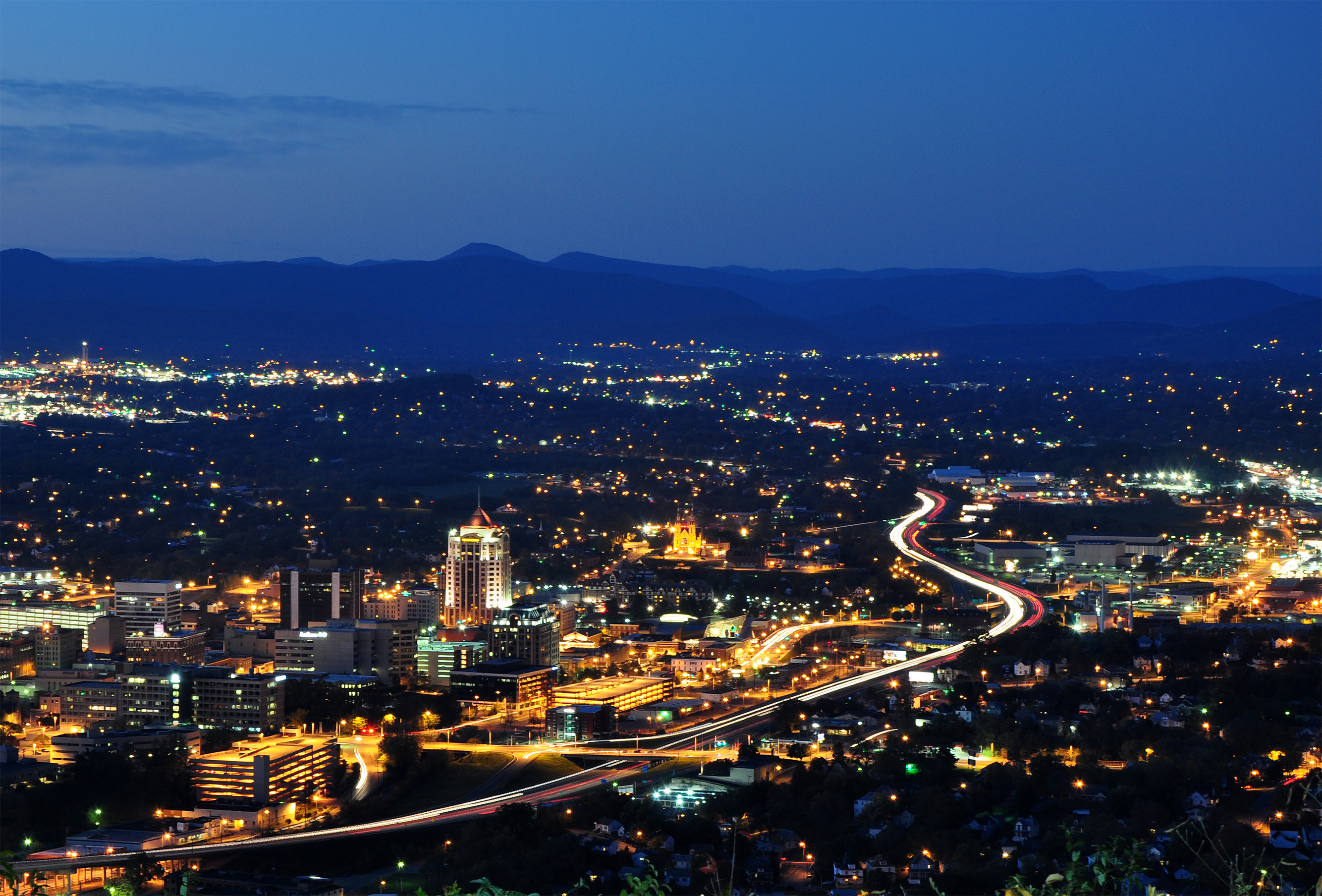
Roanoke, the eighth-largest city

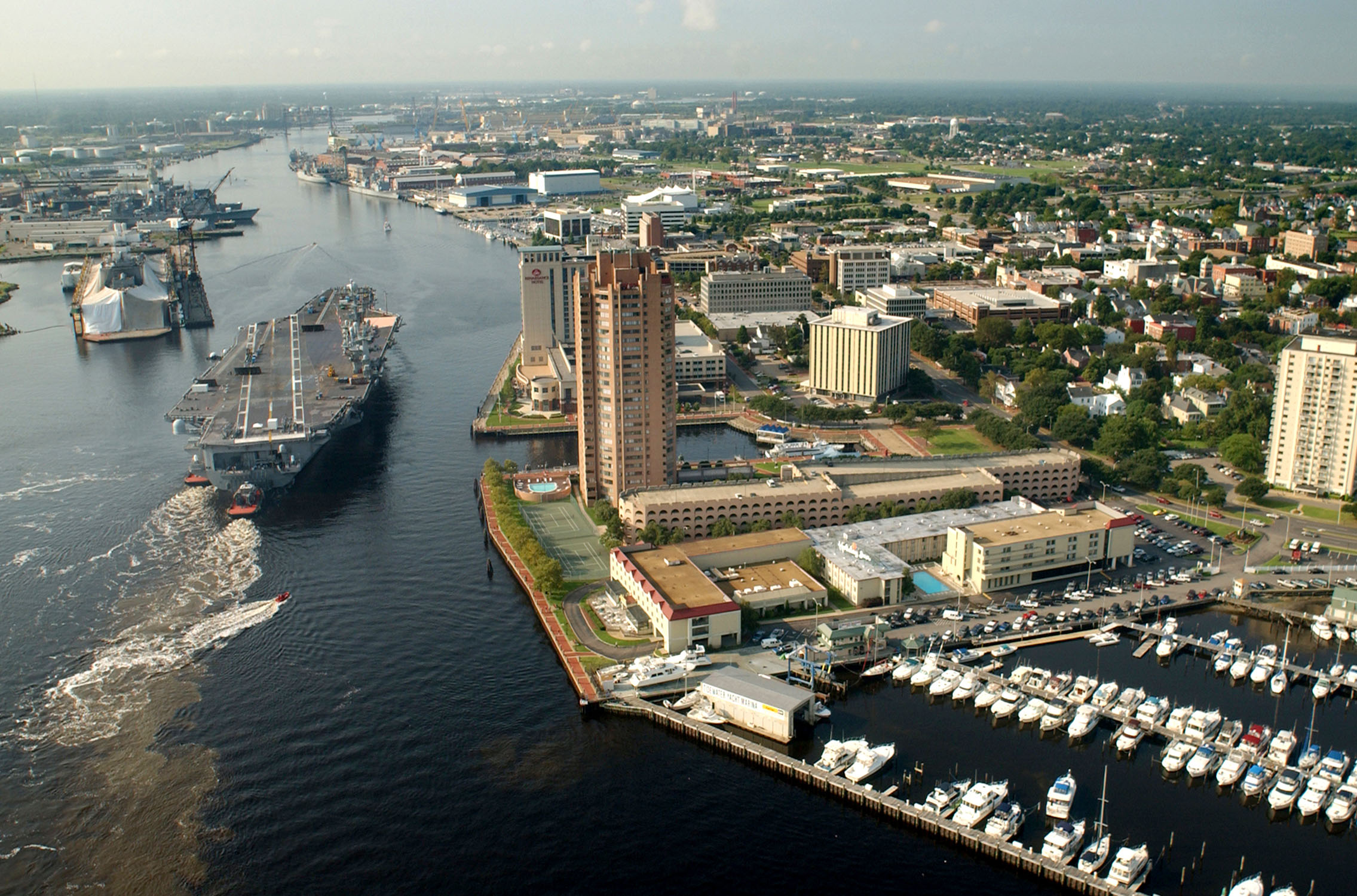
Portsmouth, the ninth-largest city

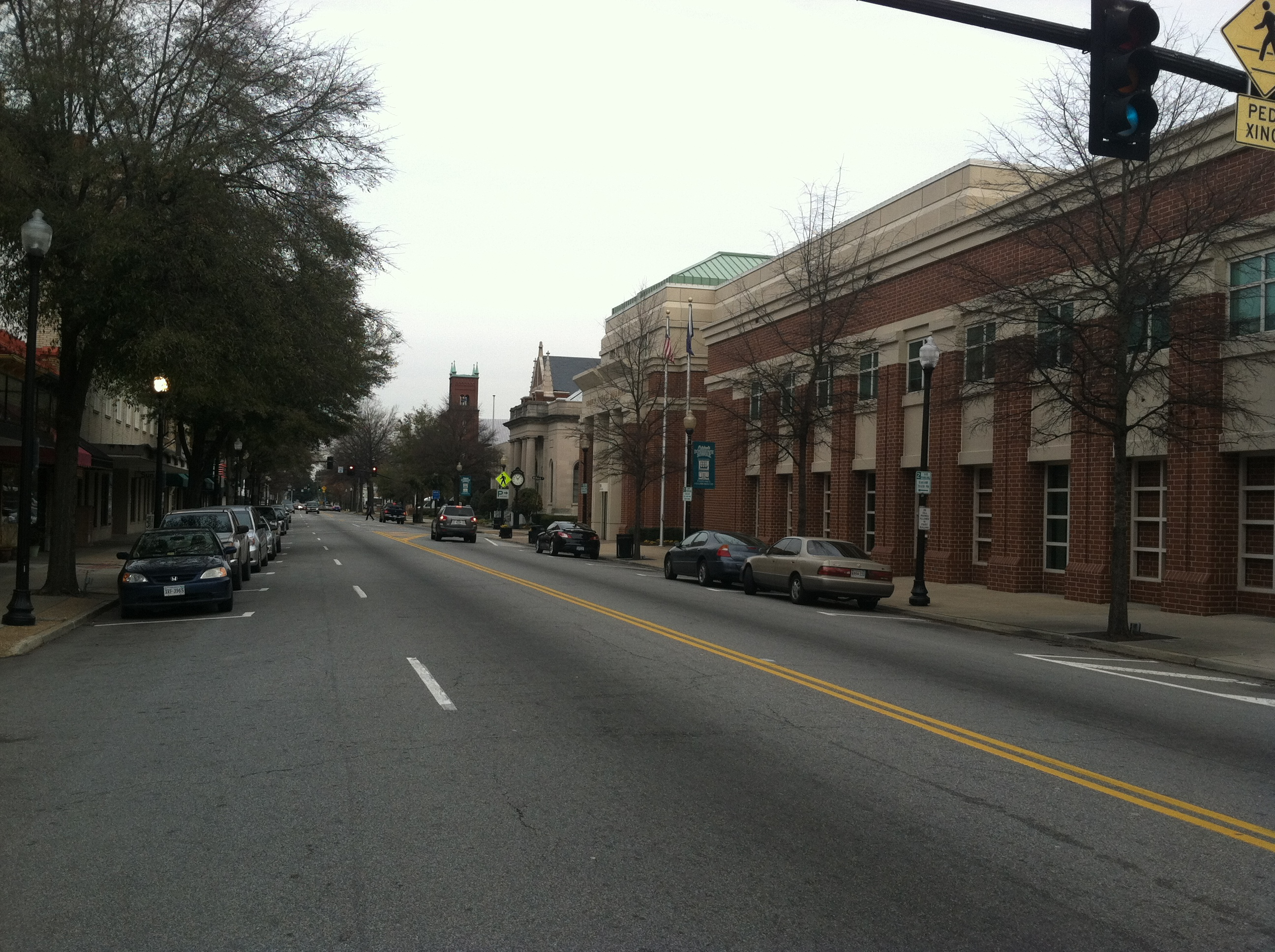
Suffolk, the tenth-largest city

== See also ==
- Administrative divisions of Virginia
- List of former counties, cities, and towns of Virginia
- List of towns in Virginia
