= Henry Cope =

Lieutenant governor of Placentia (1736–1742)

- Born: c. 1688; Kingdom of England
- Died: 12 July 1742 (aged 53–54); Kingston, Colony of Jamaica
- Spouse: Jane Patteshall
- Children: 1
- Military career
- Allegiance: Kingdom of England; Kingdom of Great Britain
- Branch: English Army; British Army
- Service years: 1706‍–‍1715; 1740‍–‍1742
- Rank: Lieutenant colonel
- Units: Queen's Regiment of Foot; Whetham's Regiment of Foot; Gooch's American Regiment
- Conflicts: War of the Spanish Succession; War of Jenkins' Ear; Battle of Cartagena de Indias; Invasion of Cuba
- Other work: Merchant

Henry Cope (c. 1688 – 12 July 1742) was an English military officer and merchant who served as the 5th lieutenant governor of Placentia from 1736 until his death in 1742.

== Early life and military career ==
Henry Cope was born in the year 1688, in England. He first enlisted into the English Army in 1706 as an ensign in the Queen's Regiment of Foot, serving under Lieutenant General John Richmond Webb. With this unit, he served under the Duke of Marlborough in Flanders. After his service in Flanders, he was stationed in Spain for the remainder of the war. By 1715, he had made it to be a captain in Thomas Whetham's Regiment of Foot, and in that year he made it to the rank of major. He resigned his commission soon after achieving this promotion.

== Political career ==
After resigning his commission, Cope travelled to New England in pursuit of business ventures. He primarily lived in Boston during his time in New England, while his business ventures extended into Nova Scotia and Newfoundland. On 11 December [O.S. 30 November] 1725, Cope was appointed to be the military town major of the British garrison at Placentia, Newfoundland. Given the relaxed nature of the position, he still divided his time between New England, Nova Scotia, and Newfoundland.

=== Nova Scotia council and failed mine ===
On 20 November 1729, Cope was assigned to the Nova Scotia Council at Annapolis Royal, and was sworn in by Nova Scotia's governor, Richard Philipps. While on the council, on 24 June 1731, a group of merchants from Boston had requested a grant of land situated on the Bay of Fundy, by the Isthmus of Chignecto, expressly for the purposes of mining out a coal deposit. The board unanimously approved this land grant, however on 19 June 1732, Cope appeared before the council. He now had an interest in the mining project. He proposed that he and his company be given a land grant to the area, in exchange for a payment of one shilling and sixpence for every chalder of coal they mined in the entirety of the province as quit rent, upon the condition of a patent. The next day, the council voted unanimously to agree to a patent, and on the 21st of that month, a patent had been drafted and signed. The patent stated that the company would purchase the land at a rate of one penny per acre in quit rent, and receive 4,000 acres (1,600 ha) of land, while they were to cultivate one tenth of the lands, erect four houses in three years, reserve coal for the troops, and that they were to begin the settlement of a new town in the area called Williamstown. Cope and his company set up their mine in what is now known as the Joggins Formation, utilizing troops from the local garrison as workers and security personnel, however the mine didn't last long, as by 15 November 1732, the mine had been destroyed by the local Mi'kmaq population.

=== Lieutenant governorship ===
Following the failure of his mining project in Nova Scotia, on 22 July 1736, Cope was appointed lieutenant governor of Placentia, after Samuel Gledhill died. Not much is known about his time as lieutenant governor. On 4 September 1740, a royal commission was assembled to mark out the border between Massachusetts Bay and Rhode Island. Cope was included on that list, however at this point, he had already been selected and sent off as part of an expedition to the West Indies.

== Return to the military and death ==
War broke out between Great Britain and Spain in the West Indies in 1739, and lieutenant general and former lieutenant governor of Virginia Alexander Spotswood was chosen to raise a regiment from the Americas to fight for the British on 5 April 1740. Cope was recommended to become a Lieutenant Colonel in the regiment by Major General John Ligonier, and he ended up serving with the unit. Because of his enlistment with this unit, he was unable to embark with the royal commission he had been assigned to. Cope was unable to serve under Spotswood, however, as he would end up dying on 7 June 1740. Lieutenant governor of Virginia William Gooch was soon installed to fill his place as colonel of the regiment. The regiment was meant to serve with Admiral Edward Vernon in fighting against Spanish possessions in the Caribbean. The unit left New York in September 1740 to rendezvous in Kingston, Jamaica. Following the rendezvous, Cope participated in the Battle of Cartagena de Indias, which ended in a British defeat. He also participated in the botched invasion of Cuba. On 5 March 1742, the unit was deployed again, this time to Panama City, however this also ended in a failure, in part due to rampant sickness among the soldiers in the regiment. Henry Cope died on 12 July 1742, from a fever in Kingston, Jamaica.

== Personal life ==
Cope was married to Jane Patteshall, of Boston. The couple had one daughter, Jane.

During the War of the Spanish Succession, controversy arose when it was revealed that Captain Cope of Whetham's Regiment of Foot had married a local, Eulalia Morell, while stationed in Menorca under the leadership of lieutenant general Richard Kane, all while still having a living wife in England. Cope's wife made the journey to Port Mahon in 1720, although she could not find her husband there.
