= Lady Rebecca Staunton =

English noblewoman

Personal details
- Born: 1685 Hampton, London, England
- Died: February 1775 (aged 89–90) Bath, Somerset, England
- Resting place: St. Andrew's Church, Surrey, England
- Spouse: Sir William Gooch, 1st Baronet

Lady Rebecca Staunton Gooch (1685 – February 1775), also referred to as "Lady Gooch" and "Dame Rebecca Gooch", was an English noblewoman and wife of Sir William Gooch, the Colonial Governor of Virginia from 1727 to 1749. The city of Staunton, Virginia is named after her, as well as a daylily flower, which is named "Lady Rebecca Staunton" in her honor.

== Biography ==
Lady Staunton was born in 1685 in Hampton, London, the daughter of Robert Staunton, a squire.

In 1714 she married Sir William and moved with him to the Governor's Palace in Williamsburg, Virginia when he became Colonial Governor in 1727. While in Williamsburg, she served as mistress of a large plantation, directing the activities of the household and social engagements.

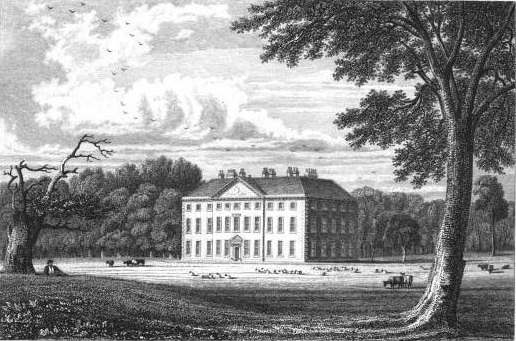
Benacre Hall, c. 1824

As an early "first lady" of Colonial Virginia, Lady Staunton has been described as a "woman of queenly graces of mind and heart."

Lady Staunton and her husband had one son, Major William Gooch, (b. 1716); he died in Virginia in 1742 aged 26 from the "Bloody Flux."

In 1749 they moved to the Benacre Hall estate in Suffolk, where Lady Staunton lived until her death in 1775.

=== Death and burial ===
Lady Staunton died in February 1775. She was buried at the St Andrew's Churchyard in Surrey, England. In her will, she bequeathed a four-volume Bible and a silver-gilt cup to the Bruton Parish Church of the College of William & Mary.

== Titles, styles, and arms ==
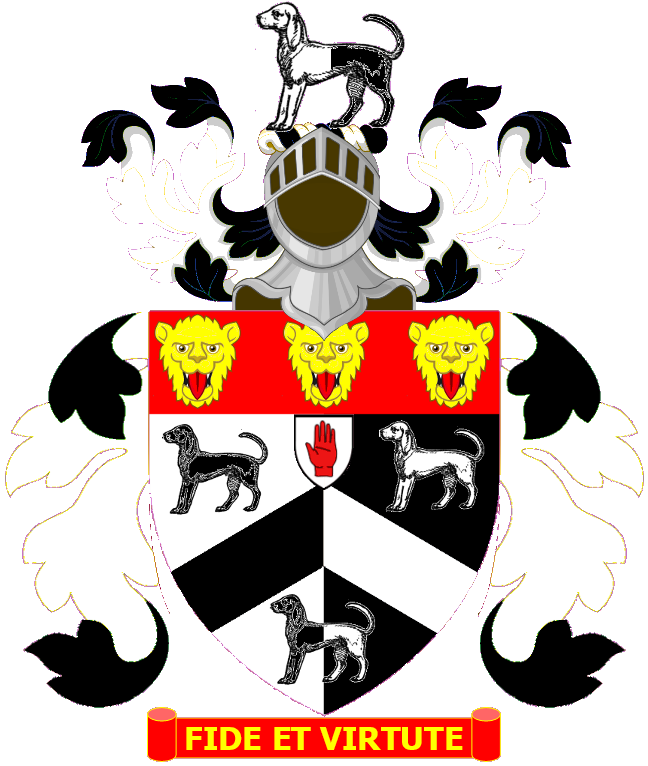
Coat of Arms of the Gooch Baronetcy

The Gooch Baronetcy of Benacre Hall in the County of Suffolk was created in the Baronetage of Great Britain on November 4, 1746, by King George II for William Gooch.
