= Patrick Henry County, Virginia =

American county, 1777 to 1790

Coordinates: 36°40′N 80°05′W

Patrick Henry County is an extinct county which was established in Virginia in 1777 by splitting it off from Pittsylvania County. It was named in honor of Virginia patriot, Patrick Henry, who was serving as the first governor of Virginia following the Declaration of Independence at the time.

In 1790, Patrick Henry County was split into two separate counties, the western part becoming Patrick County and the rest becoming Henry County. They are both named for Patrick Henry.
