= Gooch's American Regiment =

61st Foot (Gooch's American Regiment)
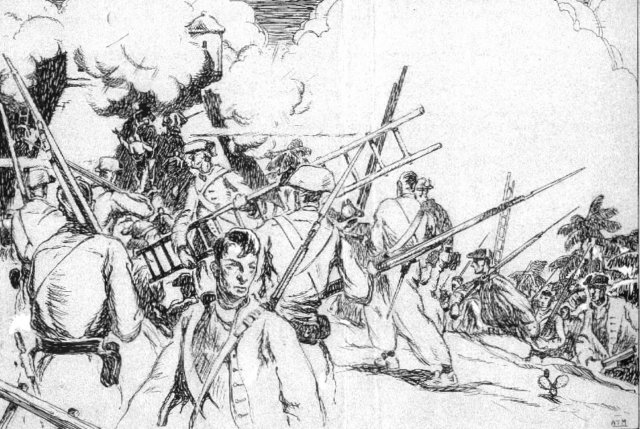
- Active: 1739–1742
- Country: Great Britain
- Branch: British Army
- Type: Marines
- Size: 4 battalions
- Engagements: War of Jenkins' Ear; Battle of Cartagena de Indias

Commanders
- Notable commanders: Sir William Gooch

Gooch's American Regiment was a British Army regiment raised in the Thirteen Colonies in 1739 for service during the War of Jenkins' Ear. Formed from colonists recruited in British North America, the regiment, consisting of four battalions, sailed to Jamaica before proceeding to the Viceroyalty of New Granada to take part in the Battle of Cartagena de Indias in 1741. Intended to serve as marines, the regiment had a poor reputation in the British military and was widely regarded as undicisplined, being responsible for the failure of a British attack during the battle. After suffering heavy casualties, mostly from disease, the regiment was sent back to North America and disbanded in October 1742.

== Formation ==
During the War of Jenkins' Ear, the British military made plans to besiege and occupy the strategic port of Cartagena de Indias in the Viceroyalty of New Granada. To support the planned siege, Britain instructed their North American colonies in 1739 to raise 3,000 troops to fight alongside British forces during the attack on Cartagena. This number was rapidly reached and even exceeded, with the Colony of Virginia (the only British North American colony to do so) using impressment to raise soldiers among the colony's indentured servants and convicts. Authorities in the Province of Pennsylvania enlisted 300 indentured servants which volunteered for military service, something that breached their indenture contracts. Nine British North American colonies raised troops for the expedition; Massachusetts raised five companies, Rhode Island raised two, Connecticut raised two, New York raised five, New Jersey raised three, Pennsylvania raised eight, Maryland raised three, Virginia raised four, and North Carolina raised four for a total of 36 companies which were subsequently organized into four battalions.

As an innovation, and in breach of precedent, the four battalions were organized into one regiment and incorporated into the British Army, with its costs being borne by British taxpayers; the regiment's officers were also granted the right to be on half pay during times of peace. This model was copied by the 50th and 51st Regiments of Foot, which were also raised in Britain's North American colonies. Governor Alexander Spotswood was initially appointed as colonel of the regiment, but after his death on June 7, 1740 the lieutenant governor of Virginia, Sir William Gooch, was commissioned colonel in his stead; the rest of the regiment's senior officers were from the British Army, while the junior officers were members of the colonial elite, although one lieutenant and one sergeant per company was to be British. The best known regimental officer from British North America was Captain Lawrence Washington, George Washington's older half-brother. The regiment, known as Gooch's American Regiment, consisted of one colonel, four lieutenant-colonels, four majors, 36 captains] , 72 lieutenants, four adjutants, four quartermasters, one surgeon, four surgeon's mates, 144 sergeants, 144 corporals, 72 drummers, and 3,240 sentinels.

== Expedition to Cartagena ==
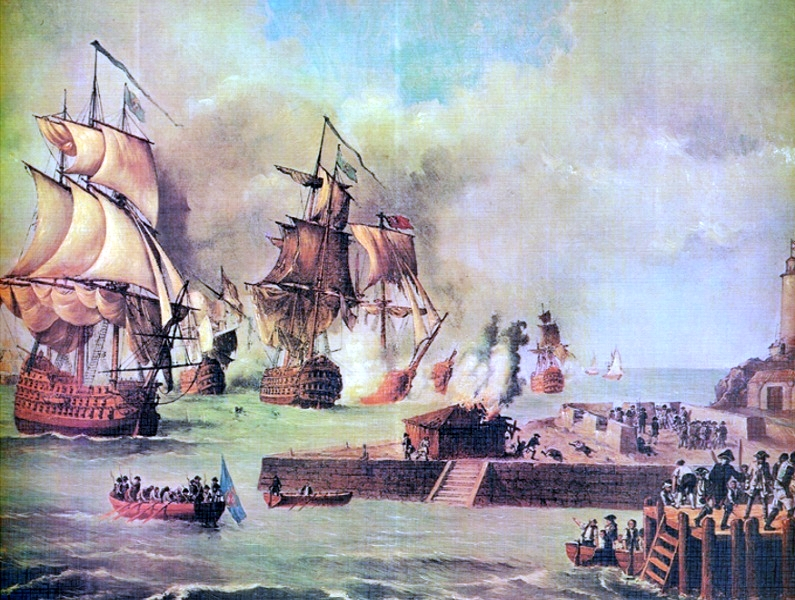
An illustration of the Battle of Cartagena de Indias

The British contingent of the expedition sailed from England in November 1740, after being delayed by four months. When they met up with a Royal Navy fleet commanded by Admiral Edward Vernon at Jamaica in January 1741, diseases and scurvy were rife among the contingent, whose commander, Major-General Lord Cathcart, had died of disease. The American Regiment was already on Jamaica, but remained unready for combat. The British authorities had made no efforts to pay or feed the regiment, to the point where its soldiers, already undisciplined to begin with, were on the verge of rioting; sickness was even more rampant among the American Regiment than other elements of the expedition. The expedition sailed however, and by the middle of March was at the coast of the Spanish Main. To reach Cartagena, the fleet had to force entry through a small passage, Boca Chica, defended by three forts. The troops were landed, except the American Regiment, of which only 300 soldiers were trusted to leave the ships due to the regiment's unruliness. Having opened the passage by taking the forts, the troops reembarked and the fleet continued towards Cartagena.

By April 20, the new army commander, Lieutenant-General Thomas Wentworth, led a force attacking the outworks of Cartagena. The American Regiment were instructed to carry scaling ladders and woolpacks for the storming columns, but during the attack at Fort St. Lazar they threw down their burdens and fled, leaving the British without means to carry the walls. A Spanish counterattack threatened to cut off British troops from their ships, and the attacking force had to withdraw. Yellow fever was now rampant among the British expeditionary force, with half its members incapacitated. The army reembarked, and the fleet returned to the coast where the soldiers lay dying without care on the troopships. In early May, the fleet and the troops returned to Jamaica. The sickness did not abate, however, and by this time the British troops were reduced to thirteen hundred men, and the American Regiment to fourteen hundred.

Strength and casualties in Gooch's American Regiment 1741
Place	Date	Effective NCOs and men	Sick at Jamaica	Sick	Wounded	Dead of wounds or sickness	Killed	Deserted
Harbor of Jamaica	Jan. 11	3,119	351		0	105	0	45
Cartagena Harbor	March 31	3,112	166	0	19	48	15	0
Cartagena Harbor	April 25	2,968	159	444	67	63	39	0
Cuba	Oct. 3	2,158	361	0	0	51	0	6
Kingston, Jamaica	Dec. 7	1,815	672		0	214	0	3

== Disbandment ==
In August, the British command decided to invade Cuba, and on August 29 the fleet anchored at Cumberland Bay, about 90 miles from Santiago de Cuba, landing men and supplies; the troops remained in camp without any offensive movements until November however, when they reembarked and returned to Jamaica. Sickness continued; reinforcements with three thousand fresh troops from England in February 1742 soon fell ill and started to die. In March an attempt to attack Portobelo was launched, but had to be aborted before arriving on the Spanish Main due to sickness, and the expedition returned yet again to Jamaica. In October, the remnants of the American Regiment were discharged and the regiment disbanded. Of 4,163 officers and men in the regiment, only 1,463 survived. The surviving officers were receiving half-pay for the rest of their lives, but only after having appeared before a Board of Generals in London, pleading their case.

== Morale ==
According to John William Fortescue, the American Regiment was distrusted by the rest of the British military, but there were also plenty of reasons for the Americans to distrust, and feel betrayed by, the British government and the British military leadership, besides the rampant diseases that everyone fell victim to, irrespective of rank or origin, and the lack of surgeons and stores on the hospital ships, that all suffered equally. The lack of pay and subsistence on Jamaica, forced the officers of the regiment to take personal loans at exorbitant interests from the local merchants in order to feed the men. At Cartagena, large detachments from the American Regiment were employed as pioneers, together with enslaved Africans from Jamaica who had been temporarily conscripted from their owners; being relegated into performing logistical work alongside slaves further sapped the regiment's morale.

Most of the regiment's soldiers served aboard the naval ships, as marines or seamen, the latter being a clear breach of their terms of enlistment. Aboard they faced one ignominy after the other; not being furnished with berths or hammocks, having to do all the dirty and heavy work, being moved from ship to ship without their officers' knowledge, some even badly beaten by the ships' officers, constantly harassed by the sailors who threw their clothing overboard. In February 1742, the field officers of the regiment protested in a memorial to General Wentworth, who brought their complaints to the attention of Admiral Vernon, but to no avail.

== Uniforms ==
The men of Gooch's American Regiment wore red uniform coats with brown waistcoats, and canvas trousers. The facing and lining were red, and the trousers white. The officers wore red uniform coats, with red facing and lining, green waistcoats with lace, red breeches, and white gaiters.
