= Sir William Gooch, 1st Baronet =

British army officer and colonial administrator (1681–1751)

Major-General Sir William Gooch Bt
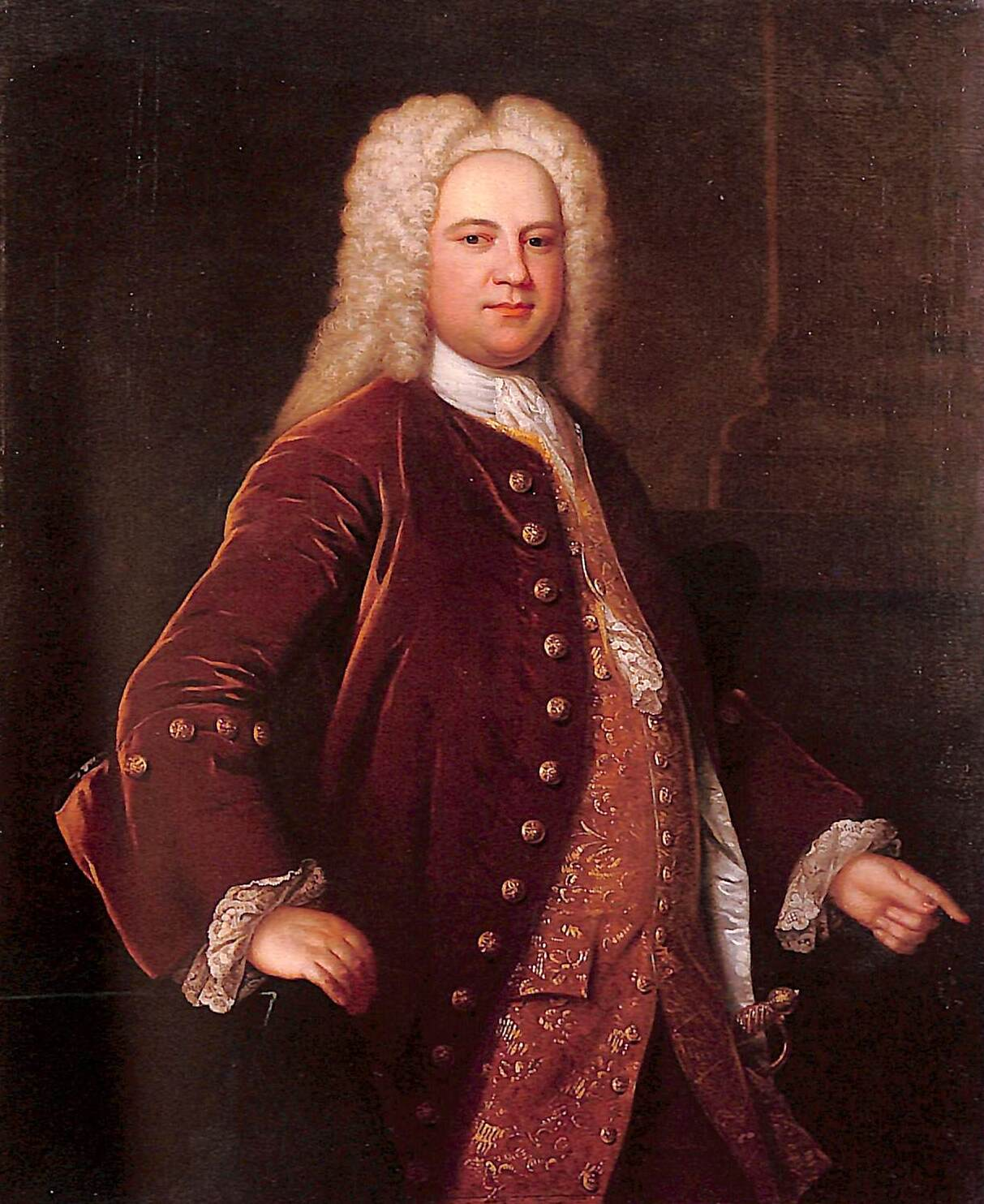
- c. 1725 portrait

Governor of Virginia
- In office 1727–1749
- Monarch: George II
- Preceded by: James Blair
- Succeeded by: Thomas Lee

Personal details
- Born: 21 October 1681 Great Yarmouth, England
- Died: 17 December 1751 (aged 70) London, England
- Spouse: Lady Rebecca Staunton (m. 1714)
- Children: William Gooch

Military service
- Allegiance: England; Great Britain
- Branch/service: English Army; British Army
- Years of service: –1751
- Rank: Major general
- Commands: Gooch's American Regiment
- Battles/wars: War of the Spanish Succession; Battle of Blenheim; War of Jenkins' Ear; Battle of Cartagena de Indias; King George's War

Major-General Sir William Gooch, 1st Baronet (21 October 1681 – 17 December 1751) was a British army officer and colonial administrator who served as the governor of Virginia from 1727 to 1749. Technically, Gooch only held the title of Royal Lieutenant Governor, but the nominal governors, Lord Orkney and Lord Albemarle, were in England and did not exercise much authority. Gooch's tenure as governor was characterized by his unusual political effectiveness.

One of his greatest successes was the passage of the Tobacco Inspection Act of 1730. The Act called for the inspection and regulation of Virginia's tobacco, the most important crop of the colony. Tobacco planters were required to transport their crop to public warehouses where it was inspected and stored. The Act raised the quality of Virginia's tobacco and reduced fraud; this greatly increased the demand for Virginia tobacco in Europe. Gooch's military policy focused on protecting the western territory from Native Americans and French encroachment.

== Administration of Virginia ==
Gooch promoted the settlement of the Shenandoah Valley in order to buffer the rest of the colony from Indian attacks, and to prevent the French from settling the land. However, in the early 1730s, Western expansion was fraught by the Iroquois invasion each spring, as settlements inevitably fell along their war-trails leading south. Gooch decided to broker peace between the Six Nations and their southern enemies, to end the warfare. He hired Conrad Weiser to negotiate in the winter of 1736 and 1737, before the war season began. Weiser was successful in negotiating an armistice, allowing Gooch to authorize settlement of the Shenandoah Valley.

c. 1742–1746 miniature portrait of Gooch's son William

He had many military credentials, including fighting under John Churchill, 1st Duke of Marlborough in his campaigns in the Low Countries and as a colonel of Gooch's American Regiment with Admiral Edward Vernon in his expedition against Cartagena, New Grenada (now in Colombia), as part of the War of Jenkins' Ear. During King George's War, Gooch received an appointment as brigadier-general in charge of the army raised to invade Canada, but declined. Gooch was made a baronet in 1746 and a major general in 1747. Also in 1747, Gooch made a speech condemning all religious groups aside from the established Church (the Church of England). However, in 1738, Gooch had given a group of Presbyterians the right to settle new territory under the conditions of the English Act of Toleration. In 1749, Gooch left Virginia and returned to England.

== Family and legacy ==
Gooch married Rebecca Staunton (for whom Staunton, Virginia, is named), the daughter of a Middlesex squire. The two had a son named William who grew up in Williamsburg, Virginia. William became a Royal Navy officer but died of dysentery at the age of 26 shortly before his parents returned to England. Gooch honored himself with the naming of Goochland County, Virginia, in 1727. A residence hall at the College of William and Mary is also named in his honor.

== Arms ==
Coat of arms of Sir William Gooch, 1st Baronet
Crest A talbot statant per pale Argent and Sable. Escutcheon Per pale Argent and Sable a chevron between three talbots statant all counterchanged, on a chief Gules three leopards' faces Or. Motto Fide Et Virtute

== Notes ==
Baronetage of Great Britain
New creation	Baronet (of Benacre Hall); 1746–1751	Succeeded by Thomas Gooch
