= 1911 Cambridge University by-election =

UK parliamentary by-election

← Dec. 1910	11–16 February 1911	1918 →
- Turnout: 64.4%
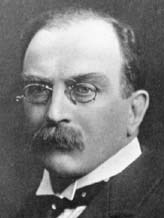

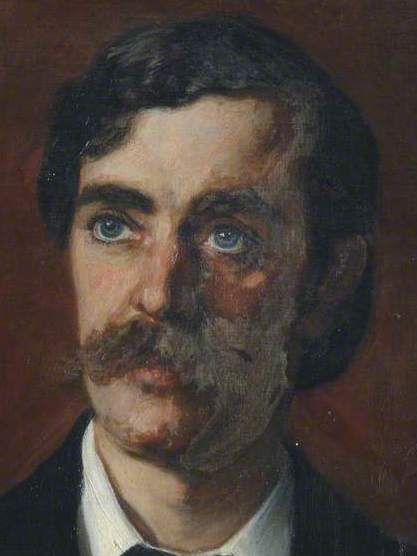
	First party	Second party	Third party
		FT
Candidate	Joseph Larmor	Harold Cox	Thomas Ethelbert Page
Party	Conservative	Free Trade	Ind. Conservative
Popular vote	2,308	1,954	332
Percentage	50.3%	42.5%	7.2%
MP before election
Samuel Butcher
Conservative
Elected MP
Joseph Larmor
Conservative

The 1911 Cambridge University by-election was a Parliamentary by-election held on 11-16 February 1911. The constituency returned two Members of Parliament to the House of Commons of the United Kingdom, elected by the first past the post voting system.

== Vacancy ==
Samuel Butcher had been Unionist MP for the seat of Cambridge University since the 1906 general election. He died on 29 December 1910 at the age of 60.

== Electoral history ==
This was a safe Conservative constituency in which a challenger rarely appeared. At both the General Elections in 1910, the two Conservative candidates were returned unopposed. The last contested election was in 1906 when one of the sitting Conservative MPs stood on a platform of Free Trade in opposition to the Unionist tariff reform policies:

General election 18 January 1906: Cambridge University (2 seats)
Party	Candidate	Votes	%	±%
Conservative	Samuel Butcher	3,050	39.72	N/A
Conservative	John Frederick Peel Rawlinson	2,976	38.76	N/A
Free Trade	John Eldon Gorst	1,653	21.53	N/A
Majority		1,323	17.23	N/A
Turnout		4,063	65.8	N/A
Conservative hold		Swing	N/A	
Conservative hold		Swing	N/A	

== Candidates ==
- Fifty-four-year-old Sir Joseph Larmor was chosen by the Conservatives to defend the seat. He was the Lucasian Professor of Mathematics at Cambridge. He was standing for parliament for the first time.
- Fifty-two-year-old Harold Cox stood on the same Free Trade platform used by Gorst in 1906. Cox however was a former Liberal Party MP, having sat for Preston from 1906 to 1910. He opposed many of the social reform policies of the Liberal government and was defeated at the January 1910 general election, where Gorst was standing as an official Liberal candidate. Since then he was appointed by the Conservative backed Municipal Reform Party as an Alderman for the London County Council.
- A third candidate appeared in the shape of Thomas Ethelbert Page, who also stood on a Conservative platform. He was standing for parliament for the first time.

== Campaign ==
Polling took place over a five-day period from 11 to 16 February 1911.

== Result ==
The Conservative Party held the seat.

1911 Cambridge University by-election
Party	Candidate	Votes	%	±%
Conservative	Joseph Larmor	2,308	50.3	N/A
Free Trade	Harold Cox	1,954	42.5	N/A
Ind. Conservative	Thomas Ethelbert Page	332	7.2	New
Majority		354	7.8	N/A
Turnout		7,129	64.4	N/A
Conservative hold		Swing	N/A	

== Aftermath ==
Larmoor was re-elected at the following General Election:

General Election 1918: Cambridge University (2 seats)
Party	Candidate	FPv%	Count	
Party	Candidate	FPv%	1	2
Coalition Conservative	John Frederick Peel Rawlinson	35.16	2,034	
Coalition Conservative	Joseph Larmor	32.69	1,891	1,986
Independent	William Cecil Dampier Whetham	21.09	1,220	1,229
Labour	J. C. Squire	11.06	640	641
Electorate: 9,282 Valid: 5,785 Quota: 1,929 Turnout: 62.32%
