= 1940 Cambridge University by-election =

UK parliamentary by-election

- 19–23 February

Constituency of Cambridge University
- Turnout: 38.9%
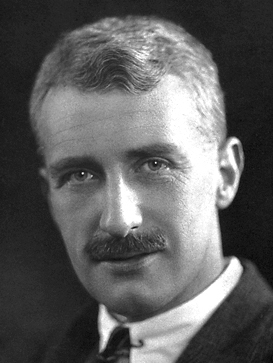

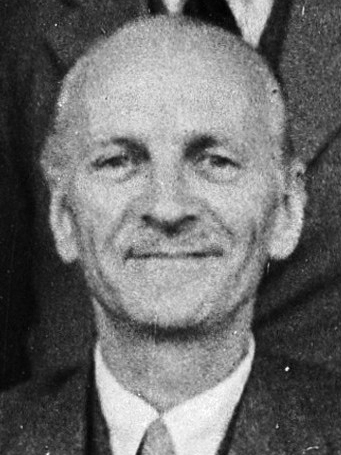
	First party	Second party
Candidate	Archibald Hill	John Ryle
Party	Ind. Conservative	Independent Progressive
Popular vote	9,840	5,387
Percentage	64.6%	35.4%
MP before election
Sir John James Withers
Conservative
Elected MP
Archibald Hill
Ind. Conservative

The 1940 Cambridge University by-election was a parliamentary by-election for the British House of Commons constituency of Cambridge University on 23 February 1940. Cambridge University was a two-member constituency.

== Vacancy ==
The by-election was caused by the death of the sitting Conservative MP, Sir John James Withers on 29 December 1939 at the age of 76. He had been one of the MPs here since holding the seat in the 1926 Cambridge University by-election.

== Election history ==
In the 1935 general election it elected two Conservative MPs. Cambridge University had been won by Conservatives at every election since 1922 when an Independent Liberal won one of the seats. The result at the last General election was as follows;

1935 general election Electorate 33,617
Party	Candidate	Votes	%	±%
Conservative	John James Withers	7,602	42.3	N/A
Conservative	Kenneth Pickthorn	6,917	38.5	N/A
Labour	Lionel Elvin	3,453	19.2	New
Majority		3,464	19.3	N/A
Turnout		17,972	53.5	N/A
Conservative hold		Swing		

== Candidates ==
Due to the wartime electoral truce, the party who were defending the seat were assured of not facing an official candidate from the other political parties. However, the Conservative Party, who were defending the seat, did not put forward an official candidate.

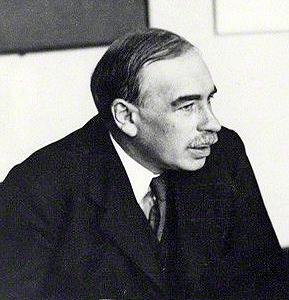
John Maynard Keynes in 1933

In 1939, before Withers had died, his health was not good and it was expected that a by-election would need to take place. The Master of Magdalene College, Allen Beville Ramsay had obtained agreement that none of the major parties would field a candidate if prominent economist, John Maynard Keynes chose to stand. Keynes was a Liberal Party member and so unlikely to win the seat if a Conservative was standing. Keynes declined the invitation as he felt he would wield greater influence on events if he remained a free agent.

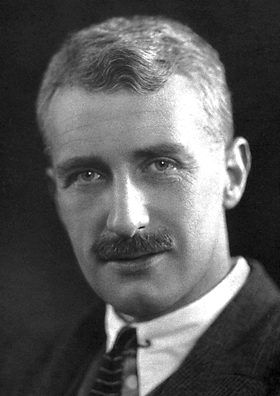
Dr. Archibald Hill in 1922

Eventually, Keynes brother in law, 54-year-old Prof. Archibald Hill became a candidate, standing as an Independent Conservative. He was professor of physiology at University College, London. In 1933, he became a founder member and vice-president of the Academic Assistance Council (which became the Society for the Protection of Science and Learning in 1936). By the start of the Second World War, the organisation had saved 900 academics from the Nazi persecution.

Fifty-one-year-old Prof. John Ryle came forward to stand as an Independent Progressive. He was appointed in 1935 Regius Professor of Physic at the University of Cambridge. Ryle was politically active at Cambridge, helping Jewish scholars emigrate from Germany and Austria before World War II. During the early stages of the war, he was working at Guy's Hospital to help them prepare for the Blitz.

== Result ==
Polling took place over four days from 19 to 23 February. Hill took the seat from the Conservatives as an Independent Conservative

Cambridge University by-election, 1940 Electorate 39,171
Party	Candidate	Votes	%	±%
Ind. Conservative	Archibald Hill	9,840	64.6	New
Independent Progressive	John Ryle	5,387	35.4	New
Majority		4,453	29.2	N/A
Turnout		39,171	38.9	N/A
Ind. Conservative gain from Conservative		Swing		

== Aftermath ==
Hill did not contest the 1945 general election, in which the two seats were won by one Conservative and one Independent;

General Election 1945: Cambridge University (2 seats)
Party	Candidate	FPv%	Count			
Party	Candidate	FPv%	1	2	3	4
Conservative	Kenneth Pickthorn	46.2	10,202			
Independent	Wilson Harris	16.2	3,574	4,709	5,185	6,556
Independent Progressive	J. B. Priestley	22.8	5,041	5,128	5,238	5,745
Ind. Conservative	Charles Hill	10.1	2,238	3,092	3,595	eliminated
National	E.L. Howard-Williams	4.7	1,036	1,798	eliminated	-
Electorate: 42,012 Valid: 22,091 Quota: 7,364 Turnout: 52.6

== See also ==
- List of United Kingdom by-elections
- United Kingdom by-election records
