= Constituency election results in the 1929 United Kingdom general election =

33rd Parliament	(1923)
34th Parliament	(1924)
35th Parliament	(1929)
36th Parliament	(1931)
37th Parliament	(1935)

Results of the election by constituency

This is a complete alphabetical list of constituency election results to the 35th Parliament of the United Kingdom at the 1929 general election, held on 30 May 1929.

== Notes ==
- Change in % vote and swing is calculated between the winner and second place and their respective performances at the 1924 election. A plus denotes a swing to the winner and a minus against the winner.

== Universities ==
Cambridge University (2 seats)
Party	Candidate	FPv%	Count	
Party	Candidate	FPv%	1	2
Unionist	John James Withers	39.8	6,356	
Unionist	Godfrey Wilson	31.7	5,069	6,046
Liberal	Hubert Henderson	19.4	3,099	3,131
Labour	Alexander Wood	9.1	1,463	1,480
Electorate: 23,978 Valid: 15,987 Quota: 5,330 Turnout: 66.7

Combined English Universities (2 seats)
Party	Candidate	FPv%	Count	
Party	Candidate	FPv%	1	2
Unionist	Martin Conway	26.8	2,679	4,321
Independent	Eleanor Rathbone	33.3	3,331	3,394
Liberal	Robert Seymour Conway	22.3	2,231	2,281
Unionist	Amherst Selby-Bigge	17.6	1,762	eliminated
Electorate: 13,775 Valid: 10,003 Quota: 3,335 Turnout: 72.6

Combined Scottish Universities (3 seats)
Party	Candidate	FPv%	Count	
Party	Candidate	FPv%	1	2
Unionist	John Buchan	39.7	9,959	
Unionist	George Andreas Berry	22.9	5,755	9,262
Liberal	Dugald Cowan	26.7	6,698	
Labour	James Kerr	10.7	2,691	2,867
Electorate: 43,192 Valid: 25,103 Quota:

London University
Party	Candidate	Votes	%	±%
Independent	Ernest Graham-Little	5,869	53.5	+16.4
Liberal	Walter Layton	2,923	26.6	+8.8
Unionist	John William Gilbert	2,179	19.9	−12.7
Majority		2,946	26.8	+22.3
Turnout		10,971	70.5	−1.5
Independent hold		Swing	n/a	

Oxford University (2 seats)
Party	Candidate	FPv%	Count	
Party	Candidate	FPv%	1	2
Unionist	Hugh Cecil	52.4	6,012	
Unionist	Charles Oman	19.0	2,174	4,112
Liberal	Gilbert Murray	28.6	3,277	3,529
Electorate: 15,770 Valid: 11,463 Quota: 3,822 Turnout: 72.7%

Queen's University of Belfast
Party	Candidate	Votes	%	±%
UUP	Thomas Sinclair	Unopposed	n/a	n/a
UUP hold		Swing	n/a	

University of Wales
Party	Candidate	Votes	%	±%
Liberal	Ernest Evans	1,712	63.5	+4.1
Labour	D Richards	671	24.9	n/a
Unionist	Courtenay Mansel	314	11.6	n/a
Majority		1,041	38.6	+20.0
Turnout			74.4	
Liberal hold		Swing	n/a	
