= Hubert Henderson =

H.D. Henderson

Sir Hubert Douglas Henderson (20 October 1890 – 22 February 1952), was a British economist and Liberal Party politician.

== Background ==
Henderson was born the son of John Henderson of Glasgow. He was educated at Aberdeen Grammar School, Rugby School and Emmanuel College, Cambridge. In 1915, he married Faith Bagenal. They had one son (Nicholas Henderson) and two daughters. Henderson was knighted in 1942.

== Professional career ==
Henderson was Secretary of the Cotton Control Board from 1917 to 1919 and was a Fellow of Clare College, Cambridge and University Lecturer in Economics from 1919 to 1923. He was editor of The Nation and Athenaeum from 1923 to 1930. Henderson was Joint Secretary to the Economic Advisory Council from 1930 to 1934. In 1934, he became a Fellow of All Souls College, Oxford.

Henderson was Drummond Professor of Political Economy at Oxford from 1945 to 1951. He was appointed Warden of All Souls College, Oxford, in 1951, but he did not take up the appointment. He became an Honorary Fellow of Nuffield College, Oxford in 1952.

== Political career ==
Henderson served as President of the Cambridge Union in Michaelmas Term 1912. In 1922, he was one of the founders of the Liberal Summer School. He was a major contributor to the report of the Liberal Industrial Inquiry entitled Britain's Industrial Future, published in 1928, which advocated a large-scale programme of national development. For the 1929 election, Henderson and John Maynard Keynes produced a pamphlet, Can Lloyd George do it?, supporting the Liberal leader's claim to be able to conquer unemployment.

Henderson was the Liberal candidate for Cambridge University at the 1929 general election but was not elected. He did not stand for Parliament again. He was a member of the West India Royal Commission from 1938 to 1939. Henderson was the Economic Adviser to His Majesty's Treasury from 1939 to 1944. He became a member of the Royal Commission on Population in 1944 and served as chairman in 1946. Henderson was Chairman of the Statutory Committee on Unemployment Insurance from 1945 to 1948.

=== Electoral record ===
General Election 1929: Cambridge University (2 seats)
Party	Candidate	FPv%	Count	
Party	Candidate	FPv%	1	2
Unionist	John James Withers	39.76	6,356	
Unionist	Godfrey Wilson	31.71	5,069	6,046
Liberal	Hubert Henderson	19.38	3,099	3,131
Labour	Alexander Wood	9.15	1,463	1,480
Electorate: 23,978 Valid: 15,987 Quota: 5,330 Turnout: 66.67%

== See also ==
- Rede Lecture
- Constituency election results in the 1929 United Kingdom general election
- Supply and demand
