= J. R. M. Butler =

British politician and academic (1889–1975)

Sir J. R. M. Butler OBE
- Butler in 1962
- Born: James Ramsay Montagu Butler; 20 July 1889; Cambridge, England
- Died: 1 March 1975 (aged 85)

Sir James Ramsay Montagu Butler, OBE (20 July 1889 – 1 March 1975) was a British politician and academic. He was a member of parliament for Cambridge University from 1922 to 1923. He was Regius Professor of Modern History at the University of Cambridge from 1947 to 1954, and vice-master of Trinity College, Cambridge, from 1954 to 1960. He also saw military service during both the First and Second World Wars.

== Early life and education ==
Butler was born at Trinity College, Cambridge, where his father, Henry Montagu Butler (1833–1918), Cambridge senior classic in 1855, was master of the college (1886–1918). His mother, Montagu Butler's second wife, Agnata Frances Ramsay, attained the highest marks in the Classical Tripos at Cambridge in 1887. With this impeccable classical background, Butler attended Harrow School and then Trinity College. As an undergraduate he was a brilliant scholar, winning a number of prizes including the Chancellor's Medal in Classics and the Craven Scholarship, and gaining a double first class in Classics and History. He was also president of the Cambridge Union in 1910.

== Career ==
When the First World War broke out in 1914, he joined the Scottish Horse. This was a regiment in the Yeomanry, and it saw service in the Middle East, first in the Gallipoli Campaign and then Egypt. Butler next gained a position in the Directorate of Military Operations in the War Office and ended the war serving in the general staff of the British forces in France. His service led to him being appointed Officer of the Order of the British Empire (OBE) and he was twice mentioned in despatches.

At the end of the war Butler returned to Cambridge. In 1922 he stood as a member of parliament for Cambridge University. His greatest achievement during his short tenure in the House of Commons was the passage of the Oxford and Cambridge Universities Act 1922, which put into law the proposals of the Royal Commission established in 1919 to review the organisation and constitutions of the universities and the statutes of their colleges. He was defeated in the 1923 general election by his cousin Sir George Butler. Promotion to tutor came in 1928, a lectureship in history in 1929 and then as senior tutor in 1931. In 1929 he was appointed as a 'tutor' to Ludwig Wittgenstein, in which position he was charged with helping to navigate the administrative procedures required for the Tractatus to be accepted for examination as a PhD thesis.

Another world war intervened in his academic career. During the Second World War, Butler returned to military service in the Army Intelligence Corps, recruiting many former students including Bernard Willson to work on code breaking at Bletchley Park. From 1942 he worked in the field of civil affairs and military government, with particular focus on France. After the conclusion of hostilities, he was appointed editor United Kingdom Military Series of the History of the Second World War by the Prime Minister Clement Attlee. He was appointed Regius Professor of Modern History in 1947, holding the chair until 1954. He wrote two of the volumes concerning grand strategy published in that series. In 1958 he was given a knighthood for his work on the books. Butler resigned his chair in 1954 and was then appointed emeritus professor. The following year he was elected vice-master of Trinity College, a post he held until 1960.

== Publications ==
- The Passing of the Great Reform Bill (1914)
- Henry Montagu Butler : a memoir (1925)
- History of England, 1815–1918 (1928)
- Grand Strategy, vol II (September 1939 – June 1941) (1957)
- Lord Lothian (1960)
- Grand Strategy, vol III (June 1941 – August 1942) with J.M.A. Gwyer (1964)

== Sources ==
- Oxford Dictionary of National Biography

Parliament of the United Kingdom
Preceded by Sir Joseph Larmor; John Rawlinson	Member of Parliament for Cambridge University; 1922 – 1923; With: John Rawlinson	Succeeded by Geoffrey G. Butler; John Rawlinson
Academic offices
Preceded by George Clark	Regius Professor of Modern History at the University of Cambridge; 1947–1954	Succeeded by David Knowles
