= Thomas Townshend (MP) =

British Whig politician

The Honourable Thomas Townshend (2 June 1701 – 21 May 1780), of Frognal House, Kent, was a British Whig politician who sat in the House of Commons for 52 years from 1722 to 1774.

Townshend was the second son of Charles Townshend, 2nd Viscount Townshend, and his first wife the Hon. Elizabeth Pelham. He was educated at Eton in 1718, and was admitted at King's College, Cambridge and Lincoln's Inn in 1720.

Townshend was returned as Whig Member of Parliament for Winchelsea at the 1722 British general election and was appointed under-secretary of state to his father in 1724. At the 1727 British general election, he was returned for both Hastings and Cambridge University and chose to represent Cambridge. He was appointed Teller of the Exchequer in 1727 and held the post for the rest of his life. In 1730, his father went out of office and Townshend lost his position as under-secretary. He was returned unopposed for Cambridge University at the 1734 British general election and was appointed secretary to the Duke of Devonshire, the lord lieutenant of Ireland in 1739. He was returned unopposed in 1741 and 1747.

Townshend was returned as MP for Cambridge University in 1754, 1761 and 1768. He was a regular attender in Parliament and made occasional speeches.

Frognal House in the 1800s

Townshend married Albinia Selwyn, daughter of John Selwyn, in 1730. Albinia died in 1739. In 1752, Townshend bought Frognal House, near Sidcup in Kent. He survived his wife by over 40 years and died in May 1780, aged 78. Their son Thomas became a prominent politician and was created Viscount Sydney in 1789. Townshend had brothers Charles, William and Roger, and nephews George, Charles and Charles Townshend, 1st Baron Bayning.

== See also ==
- Marquess Townshend

Parliament of Great Britain
Preceded by Robert Bristow; George Bubb	Member of Parliament for Winchelsea; 1722–1727; With: Robert Bristow	Succeeded by Robert Bristow; John Scrope
Preceded by Archibald Hutcheson; Sir William Ashburnham	Member of Parliament for Hastings; 1727–1728; With: Sir William Ashburnham	Succeeded by Thomas Pelham; Sir William Ashburnham
Preceded by Dixie Windsor; Thomas Willoughby	Member of Parliament for Cambridge University; 1727–1774; With: Edward Finch 1727–1768; Charles Yorke 1768–1770; William de Grey 1770–1771; Richard Croftes 1771–1774	Succeeded by Richard Croftes; Marquess of Granby
Political offices
Preceded by George Treby	Teller of the Exchequer; 1727–1766	Succeeded by John Jeffreys Pratt
Preceded by Sir Edward Walpole	Chief Secretary for Ireland; 1739	Succeeded by Hon. Henry Bilson-Legge
