= William Skene =

William Skene may refer to:

- William Forbes Skene (1809–1892), Scottish lawyer and antiquarian
- William Baillie Skene (1838–1911) Scottish academic and political agent
- William Skene (Australian politician)
