= Cambridge University (constituency) =

Parliamentary constituency in the United Kingdom, 1801–1950

- Former university constituency for the House of Commons

1603–1950
- Seats: 2
- Replaced by: Cambridge

Cambridge University was a university constituency electing two members to the English House of Commons from 1603, and from 1707 until 1950 to the British House of Commons.

== Franchise and method of election ==
This university constituency was created by a Royal Charter of 1603. It was abolished in 1950 by the Representation of the People Act 1948.

The constituency was not a geographical area. Its electorate consisted of the graduates of the University of Cambridge. Before 1918 the franchise was restricted to male graduates with a Doctorate or Master of Arts degree. Sedgwick records that there were 377 electors in 1727. For the 1754–1790 period, Namier and Brooke estimated the electorate at about 500.

The constituency returned two Members of Parliament. Before 1918 they were elected by plurality-at-large voting, but from 1918 onwards the two members were elected by the Single Transferable Vote method.

== History ==
In the early 18th century, the electors of both English universities were mostly Tories, but the Whig ministers of King George I were able to persuade him to use his royal prerogative to confer Cambridge doctorates on a large number of Whigs, so that from 1727 the university largely returned Whig representatives. At Oxford, the King did not enjoy the same prerogative power, so that the University of Oxford constituency remained Tory, and indeed often Jacobite, in its preferences.

The leading 18th-century Whig politician Thomas Pelham-Holles, 1st Duke of Newcastle, was Chancellor of the University of Cambridge from 1748 to 1768 and recommended to the electors suitable candidates to represent them in Parliament. This practice continued under his successor, another Whig Duke and Prime Minister, Augustus FitzRoy, 3rd Duke of Grafton, Chancellor of the university from 1768 to 1811. However, Grafton was less influential as a politician than Newcastle had been and also less attentive towards the university, and as a result some of his nominations came in for criticism, notably that of his friend Richard Croftes.

Croftes was far from typical of a university member of parliament: he was neither the son of a peer, like the Hon. John Townshend, the Marquess of Granby, and Grafton's own son the Earl of Euston, nor a distinguished lawyer-politician, such as William de Grey, James Mansfield, and Sir Vicary Gibbs, nor a prominent political figure like William Pitt the Younger and Lord Henry Petty. In the late 18th and early 19th centuries, Pittite and Tory candidates began to be elected. At the appearance of this political development, some of the Pittite members, including the younger William Pitt himself, one of the members for the university from 1784 to 1806, described themselves as Whigs. As time passed, the division between the 19th century Tory and Whig parties became clearer.

The future Prime Minister, Viscount Palmerston, retained his university seat as a Whig after he left the Tory ranks, but in 1831 he was defeated. After Palmerston ceased to represent the university he was elected by a territorial constituency. From then until the 1920s, all of the university's members were Tories and/or Conservatives.

Even after the introduction of the single transferable vote in 1918, most of the members continued to be elected as Conservatives.

== Members of Parliament ==
This is a list of people who have been elected to represent this university in the Parliament of the United Kingdom.

=== 1603 to 1660 ===
- Constituency created 1603

Year	First member	Second member
1604	Nicholas Steward	Henry Mountlow
1614	Sir Miles Sandys	Sir Francis Bacon
1621	Robert Naunton	Barnaby Gough
1624	Sir Robert Naunton	Barnaby Gough
1625	Sir Robert Naunton	Sir Albert Morton
1626	Thomas Eden	Sir John Coke
1628–1629	Thomas Eden	Sir John Coke
1629–1640	No Parliaments summoned	
Apr 1640	Thomas Eden	Henry Lucas
Nov 1640	Thomas Eden	Henry Lucas
Eden died 1644 replaced by Nathaniel Bacon
1648	Lucas secluded in Pride's Purge	
1654	Henry Cromwell	(one seat only)
1656	Richard Cromwell	(one seat only)
1659	John Thurloe	Thomas Sclater

=== 1660 to 1784 ===
Year	Member	Party	Member	Party
1660 Apr	George Monck		Thomas Crouch	
1660 Jun	William Montagu		Thomas Crouch	
1661	Sir Richard Fanshawe		Thomas Crouch	
1667	Sir Charles Wheler, 2nd Baronet		Thomas Crouch	
1679	Sir Thomas Exton		James Vernon	
1681	Sir Thomas Exton		Robert Brady	
1689	Sir Robert Sawyer		Isaac Newton	Whig
1690	Sir Robert Sawyer		Edward Finch	
1692	Henry Boyle	Whig	Edward Finch	
1695	Henry Boyle	Whig	George Oxenden	
1698	Henry Boyle	Whig	Anthony Hammond	
1701	Henry Boyle	Whig	Isaac Newton	Court Whig
1702	Henry Boyle	Whig	Arthur Annesley	Tory
1705	Dixie Windsor	Tory	Arthur Annesley	Tory
1710	Dixie Windsor	Tory	Thomas Paske	Tory
1720	Dixie Windsor	Tory	Thomas Willoughby	Tory
1727	Edward Finch	Whig	Thomas Townshend	Whig
1768	Charles Yorke	Rockingham Whig	Thomas Townshend	Whig
1770	William de Grey		Thomas Townshend	Whig
1771	Richard Croftes		Thomas Townshend	Whig
1774	Richard Croftes		Charles Manners, Marquess of Granby	
1779	Richard Croftes		James Mansfield	
1780	Lord John Townshend	Whig	James Mansfield	

=== 1784 to 1950 ===
Year	Member	Party	Member	Party
1784	William Pitt the Younger	Tory^{1}	Earl of Euston	Whig
1806	Lord Henry Petty	Whig	Earl of Euston	Whig
1807	Sir Vicary Gibbs	Tory	Earl of Euston	Whig
1811	Sir Vicary Gibbs	Tory	Viscount Palmerston	Tory
1812	John Henry Smyth	Whig	Viscount Palmerston	Tory
1822	William John Bankes	Tory	Viscount Palmerston	Tory
1826	Sir John Copley	Tory	Viscount Palmerston	Tory
1827	Sir Nicholas Conyngham Tindal	Tory	Viscount Palmerston	Tory
1829	William Cavendish	Whig	Viscount Palmerston	Tory
1830	William Cavendish	Whig	Viscount Palmerston	Whig
1831	Henry Goulburn	Tory	William Yates Peel	Tory
1832	Henry Goulburn	Tory	Charles Manners-Sutton	Tory
1834	Henry Goulburn	Conservative	Charles Manners-Sutton	Conservative
1835	Henry Goulburn	Conservative	Hon. Charles Law	Conservative
1850	Henry Goulburn	Conservative	Loftus Wigram	Conservative
1856	Spencer Horatio Walpole	Conservative	Loftus Wigram	Conservative
1859	Spencer Horatio Walpole	Conservative	Charles Jasper Selwyn	Conservative
1868	Spencer Horatio Walpole	Conservative	Alexander Beresford Hope	Conservative
1882	Henry Cecil Raikes	Conservative	Alexander Beresford Hope	Conservative
1887	Henry Cecil Raikes	Conservative	Sir George Stokes, Bt	Conservative
1891	Sir Richard Claverhouse Jebb ^{2}	Conservative	Sir George Stokes, Bt	Conservative
1892	Sir Richard Claverhouse Jebb ^{2}	Conservative	Sir John Eldon Gorst	Conservative
1906	Samuel Butcher	Conservative	John Rawlinson	Conservative
1911	Sir Joseph Larmor	Conservative	John Rawlinson	Conservative
1918	Sir Joseph Larmor	Co. Conservative ^{3}	John Rawlinson	Co. Conservative^{3}
1922	J. R. M. Butler	Ind. Liberal^{4}	John Rawlinson	Conservative
1923	Sir Geoffrey G. Butler ^{5}	Conservative	John Rawlinson	Conservative
1926	Sir Geoffrey G. Butler ^{5}	Conservative	Sir John Withers	Conservative
1929	Godfrey Wilson	Conservative	Sir John Withers	Conservative
1935	Sir Kenneth Pickthorn	Conservative	Sir John Withers	Conservative
1940	Sir Kenneth Pickthorn	Conservative	Dr. Archibald Hill	Ind. Conservative^{4}
1945	Sir Kenneth Pickthorn	Conservative	Wilson Harris	Independent

Notes:-

- ^{1} Pitt called himself a Whig, but is usually retrospectively regarded as a Tory since most of his followers (whether their background was in the Whig or Tory tradition) came to call themselves the Tory Party in the decade after Pitt's death.
- ^{2} Jebb died on 10 December 1905 – seat vacant at dissolution.
- ^{3} Co. is an abbreviation for Coalition.
- ^{4} Ind. is an abbreviation for Independent.
- ^{5} Sir Geoffrey G. Butler died on 2 May 1929 – seat vacant at dissolution.

== Election by block vote 1715–1918 ==
1710s – 1720s – 1730s – 1740s – 1750s – 1760s – 1770s – 1780s – 1790s – 1800s – 1810s – 1820s – 1830s – 1840s – 1850s – 1860s – 1870s – 1880s – 1890s – 1900s – 1910s

=== Elections in the 1710s ===
General election 26 January 1715: Cambridge University (2 seats)
Party	Candidate	Votes	%	±%
Tory	Dixie Windsor	Unopposed	N/A	N/A
Tory	Thomas Paske	Unopposed	N/A	N/A

=== Elections in the 1720s ===
- Death of Paske

By-election 19 December 1720: Cambridge University
Party	Candidate	Votes	%	±%
Tory	Thomas Willoughby	176	55.17	N/A
Whig	Henry Finch	143	44.83	N/A
Majority		33	10.34	N/A
Turnout		319	N/A	N/A
Tory hold		Swing	N/A	

- Note (1722): Stooks Smith gives Willoughby 319 votes.

General election 22 March 1722: Cambridge University (2 seats)
Party	Candidate	Votes	%	±%
Tory	Dixie Windsor	Unopposed	N/A	N/A
Tory	Thomas Willoughby	Unopposed	N/A	N/A

General election 22 August 1727: Cambridge University (2 seats)
Party	Candidate	Votes	%	±%
Whig	Edward Finch	221	37.14	N/A
Whig	Thomas Townshend	198	33.28	N/A
Tory	Dixie Windsor	176	29.58	N/A
Turnout		595 (377 voted)	79.70	N/A
Registered electors		473		

- Note (1727): Unusually, for a pre-1832 election, Stooks Smith records the total number of electors for the constituency as well as the number who voted; so a turnout figure can be calculated.

=== Elections in the 1730s ===
General election 29 April 1734: Cambridge University (2 seats)
Party	Candidate	Votes	%	±%
Whig	Thomas Townshend	222	30.33	−2.95
Whig	Edward Finch	209	28.55	−8.59
Whig	Goodrick	174	23.77	N/A
Tory	Dixie Windsor	137	17.35	−12.23
Turnout		732	N/A	N/A

- Note (1734): Goodrick was an Opposition Whig

=== Elections in the 1740s ===
General election 6 May 1741: Cambridge University (2 seats)
Party	Candidate	Votes	%	±%
Whig	Edward Finch	Unopposed	N/A	N/A
Whig	Thomas Townshend	Unopposed	N/A	N/A

- Seat vacated when Finch was appointed a Groom of the Bedchamber

By-election 23 July 1742: Cambridge University
Party	Candidate	Votes	%	±%
Whig	Edward Finch	Unopposed	N/A	N/A
Whig hold		Swing	N/A	

General election 26 June 1747: Cambridge University (2 seats)
Party	Candidate	Votes	%	±%
Whig	Edward Finch	Unopposed	N/A	N/A
Whig	Thomas Townshend	Unopposed	N/A	N/A

=== Elections in the 1750s ===
General election 17 April 1754: Cambridge University (2 seats)
Party	Candidate	Votes	%	±%
Whig	Edward Finch	Unopposed	N/A	N/A
Whig	Thomas Townshend	Unopposed	N/A	N/A

- Seat vacated when Finch was appointed to an office

By-election 14 June 1757: Cambridge University
Party	Candidate	Votes	%	±%
Whig	Edward Finch	Unopposed	N/A	N/A
Whig hold		Swing	N/A	

=== Elections in the 1760s ===
- Seat vacated when Finch was appointed to an office

By-election 14 January 1761: Cambridge University
Party	Candidate	Votes	%	±%
Whig	Edward Finch	Unopposed	N/A	N/A
Whig hold		Swing	N/A	

General election 27 March 1761: Cambridge University (2 seats)
Party	Candidate	Votes	%	±%
Whig	Edward Finch	Unopposed	N/A	N/A
Whig	Thomas Townshend	Unopposed	N/A	N/A

General election 19 March 1768: Cambridge University (2 seats)
Party	Candidate	Votes	%	±%
Non-partisan	Charles Yorke	Unopposed	N/A	N/A
Whig	Thomas Townshend	Unopposed	N/A	N/A

=== Elections in the 1770s ===
- Seat vacated on the appointment of Yorke as Lord Chancellor

By-election 1 February 1770: Cambridge University
Party	Candidate	Votes	%	±%
Non-partisan	Sir William de Grey	Unopposed	N/A	N/A
Non-partisan hold		Swing	N/A	

- Seat vacated on the appointment of de Grey as Chief Justice of the Court of Common Pleas

By-election 4 February 1771: Cambridge University
Party	Candidate	Votes	%	±%
Non-partisan	Richard Croftes	76	62.81	N/A
Non-partisan	William Wynne	45	37.19	N/A
Majority		31	25.62	N/A
Turnout		121	N/A	N/A
Non-partisan hold		Swing	N/A	

General election 10 October 1774: Cambridge University (2 seats)
Party	Candidate	Votes	%	±%
Non-partisan	Marquess of Granby	Unopposed	N/A	N/A
Non-partisan	Richard Croftes	Unopposed	N/A	N/A

- Succession of Granby as the 4th Duke of Rutland

By-election 10 June 1779: Cambridge University
Party	Candidate	Votes	%	±%
Non-partisan	James Mansfield	157	35.68	N/A
Non-partisan	John Townshend	145	32.95	N/A
Non-partisan	Lord Hyde	138	31.36	N/A
Majority		12	2.73	N/A
Turnout		440	N/A	N/A
Non-partisan hold		Swing	N/A	

=== Elections in the 1780s ===
General election 9 September 1780: Cambridge University (2 seats)
Party	Candidate	Votes	%	±%
Non-partisan	James Mansfield	277	27.10	N/A
Non-partisan	John Townshend	247	24.17	N/A
Non-partisan	Lord Hyde	206	20.16	N/A
Non-partisan	Richard Croftes	150	14.68	N/A
Non-partisan	William Pitt	142	13.89	N/A
Turnout		1,022 (546 voters)	N/A	N/A

- Note (1780): Stooks Smith records Townshend as getting 237 votes.
- Seat vacated on Townshend being appointed to an office

By-election 3 April 1782: Cambridge University
Party	Candidate	Votes	%	±%
Non-partisan	John Townshend	Unopposed	N/A	N/A
Non-partisan hold		Swing	N/A	

- Seat vacated on Townshend being appointed to an office

By-election 11 April 1783: Cambridge University
Party	Candidate	Votes	%	±%
Non-partisan	John Townshend	Unopposed	N/A	N/A
Non-partisan hold		Swing	N/A	

- Seat vacated on Mansfield being appointed as Solicitor General for England and Wales

By-election 26 November 1783: Cambridge University
Party	Candidate	Votes	%	±%
Non-partisan	James Mansfield	Unopposed	N/A	N/A
Non-partisan hold		Swing	N/A	

General election 3 April 1784: Cambridge University (2 seats)
Party	Candidate	Votes	%	±%
Non-partisan	William Pitt	351	31.65	+17.76
Non-partisan	Earl of Euston	299	26.96	N/A
Non-partisan	John Townshend	278	25.07	+0.90
Non-partisan	James Mansfield	181	16.32	−10.78
Turnout		1,109 (588 voters)	N/A	N/A

- The 1784 election was broadly a contest between the new government of Pitt and the ousted Fox-North Coalition, in which both Townshend and Mansfield had held office.

=== Elections in the 1790s ===
General election 1790: Cambridge University (2 seats)
Party	Candidate	Votes	%	±%
Tory	William Pitt	510	42.50	+10.85
Whig	Earl of Euston	483	40.25	+13.29
Whig	Lawrence Dundas	207	17.25	N/A
Turnout		1,200 (684 voters)	N/A	N/A

- Note (1790): Party labels in the 1790–1832 period follow Stooks Smith, who classifies Pitt and his Pittite supporters as Tories without regard to what they would have actually called themselves.
- Seat vacated on Pitt being appointed Lord Warden of the Cinque Ports

By-election 1792: Cambridge University
Party	Candidate	Votes	%	±%
Tory	William Pitt	Unopposed	N/A	N/A
Tory hold		Swing	N/A	

- Seat vacated on Euston being appointed to an office

By-election 1794: Cambridge University
Party	Candidate	Votes	%	±%
Whig	Earl of Euston	Unopposed	N/A	N/A
Whig hold		Swing	N/A	

General election 1796: Cambridge University (2 seats)
Party	Candidate	Votes	%	±%
Tory	William Pitt	Unopposed	N/A	N/A
Whig	Earl of Euston	Unopposed	N/A	N/A

=== Elections in the 1800s ===
General election 1802: Cambridge University (2 seats)
Party	Candidate	Votes	%	±%
Tory	William Pitt	Unopposed	N/A	N/A
Whig	Earl of Euston	Unopposed	N/A	N/A

- Seat vacated on Pitt being appointed Chancellor of the Exchequer

By-election 1804: Cambridge University
Party	Candidate	Votes	%	±%
Tory	William Pitt	Unopposed	N/A	N/A
Tory hold				

- Death of Pitt

By-election February 1806: Cambridge University
Party	Candidate	Votes	%	±%
Whig	Lord Henry Petty	331	54.80	N/A
Whig	Viscount Althorp	145	24.01	N/A
Tory	Viscount Palmerston	128	21.19	N/A
Majority		186	30.79	N/A
Turnout		604	N/A	N/A
Whig gain from Tory		Swing	N/A	

- Palmerston was a Peer of Ireland

General election 1806: Cambridge University (2 seats)
Party	Candidate	Votes	%	±%
Whig	Lord Henry Petty	Unopposed	N/A	N/A
Whig	Earl of Euston	Unopposed	N/A	N/A

General election 1807: Cambridge University (2 seats)
Party	Candidate	Votes	%	±%
Whig	Earl of Euston	324	26.75	N/A
Tory	Vicary Gibbs	312	25.76	New
Tory	Viscount Palmerston	310	25.60	New
Whig	Lord Henry Petty	265	21.88	N/A
Turnout		1,211 (631 voters)	N/A	N/A

=== Elections in the 1810s ===
- Succession of Euston as the 4th Duke of Grafton

By-election March 1811: Cambridge University
Party	Candidate	Votes	%	±%
Tory	Viscount Palmerston	451	56.66	N/A
Whig	John Henry Smyth	345	43.34	N/A
Majority		106	13.32	N/A
Turnout		796	N/A	N/A
Tory gain from Whig		Swing	N/A	

- Seat vacated on Gibbs being appointed a Judge of the Court of Common Pleas

By-election 1812: Cambridge University
Party	Candidate	Votes	%	±%
Whig	John Henry Smyth	Unopposed	N/A	N/A
Whig gain from Tory				

General election 1812: Cambridge University (2 seats)
Party	Candidate	Votes	%	±%
Tory	Viscount Palmerston	Unopposed	N/A	N/A
Whig	John Henry Smyth	Unopposed	N/A	N/A

General election 1818: Cambridge University (2 seats)
Party	Candidate	Votes	%	±%
Tory	Viscount Palmerston	Unopposed	N/A	N/A
Whig	John Henry Smyth	Unopposed	N/A	N/A

=== Elections in the 1820s ===
General election 1820: Cambridge University (2 seats)
Party	Candidate	Votes	%	±%
Tory	Viscount Palmerston	Unopposed	N/A	N/A
Whig	John Henry Smyth	Unopposed	N/A	N/A

- Death of Smyth

By-election 1822: Cambridge University
Party	Candidate	Votes	%	±%
Tory	William John Bankes	419	45.59	N/A
Tory	Lord Harvey	281	30.58	N/A
Whig	James Scarlett	219	23.83	N/A
Majority		138	15.02	N/A
Turnout		919	N/A	N/A
Tory gain from Whig		Swing	N/A	

General election 1826: Cambridge University (2 seats)
Party	Candidate	Votes	%	±%
Tory	Sir John Copley	772	32.88	N/A
Whig	Viscount Palmerston	631	26.87	N/A
Tory	William John Bankes	508	21.64	N/A
Tory	Henry Goulburn	437	18.61	N/A
Majority		123	5.23	N/A
Turnout		2,348 (1,293 voters)	N/A	N/A
Tory hold		Swing	N/A	
Whig hold		Swing	N/A	

- Seat vacated on the appointment of Copley as Lord Chancellor and creation as 1st Baron Lyndhurst

By-election May 1827: Cambridge University
Party	Candidate	Votes	%	±%
Tory	Nicholas Conyngham Tindal	479	55.89	N/A
Tory	William John Bankes	378	44.11	N/A
Majority		101	11.78	N/A
Turnout		857	43.93	N/A
Registered electors		1,951		
Tory hold		Swing	N/A	

- Note (1827): Unusually for a pre-1832 election Stooks Smith provides a total electorate figure, so a turnout percentage can be calculated. See the 1727 result above for another instance.
- Seat vacated on the appointment of Tindal as Chief Justice of the Court of Common Pleas

By-election June 1829: Cambridge University
Party	Candidate	Votes	%	±%
Whig	William Cavendish	609	56.86	N/A
Tory	George Bankes	462	43.14	−0.97
Majority		147	13.72	N/A
Turnout		1,071		
Whig gain from Tory		Swing		

=== Elections in the 1830s ===
General election 1830: Cambridge University (2 seats)
Party	Candidate	Votes	%
Whig	Viscount Palmerston	Unopposed	
Whig	William Cavendish	Unopposed	
Whig gain from Tory			
Whig gain from Tory			

- Seat vacated on the appointment of Palmerston as Secretary of State for Foreign Affairs

By-election, 30 November 1830: Cambridge University
Party	Candidate	Votes	%
Whig	Viscount Palmerston	Unopposed	
Whig hold			

General election 1831: Cambridge University (2 seats)
Party	Candidate	Votes	%
Tory	Henry Goulburn	805	28.3
Tory	William Yates Peel	804	28.2
Whig	William Cavendish	630	22.1
Whig	Viscount Palmerston	610	21.4
Majority		174	6.1
Turnout		1,450	65.5
Registered electors		2,215	
Tory gain from Whig			
Tory gain from Whig			

General election 12 December 1832: Cambridge University (2 seats)
Party	Candidate	Votes	%
Tory	Henry Goulburn	Unopposed	
Speaker	Charles Manners-Sutton	Unopposed	
Registered electors		2,319	
Tory hold			
Speaker gain from Tory			

General election 12 December 1835: Cambridge University (2 seats)
Party	Candidate	Votes	%
Conservative	Henry Goulburn	Unopposed	
Speaker	Charles Manners-Sutton	Unopposed	
Registered electors		2,319	
Conservative hold			
Speaker hold			

- Manners-Sutton created 'The 1st Viscount Canterbury'.

By-election, 21 March 1835: Cambridge University
Party	Candidate	Votes	%
Conservative	Charles Law	Unopposed	
Conservative gain from Speaker			

General election 25 July 1837: Cambridge University (2 seats)
Party	Candidate	Votes	%
Conservative	Henry Goulburn	Unopposed	
Conservative	Charles Law	Unopposed	
Registered electors		2,613	
Conservative hold			
Conservative gain from Speaker			

- Note (1837): McCalmont's Parliamentary Poll Book classifies Law as a Peelite between this election and that of 1847.

=== Elections in the 1840s ===
General election 30 June 1841: Cambridge University (2 seats)
Party	Candidate	Votes	%	±%
Conservative	Henry Goulburn	Unopposed		
Conservative	Charles Law	Unopposed		
Registered electors		2,873		
Conservative hold				
Conservative hold				

- Note (1841): McCalmont's Parliamentary Poll Book classifies Goulburn as a Liberal Conservative and Law as a Peelite for this election.
- Goulburn appointed Chancellor of the Exchequer.

By-election, 15 September 1841: Cambridge University
Party	Candidate	Votes	%	±%
Conservative	Henry Goulburn	Unopposed		
Conservative hold				

General election 3 August 1847: Cambridge University (2 seats)
Party	Candidate	Votes	%	±%
Conservative	Charles Law	1,486	31.7	N/A
Conservative	Henry Goulburn	1,189	25.4	N/A
Conservative	Rudolph Feilding	1,147	24.5	N/A
Whig	John Shaw-Lefevre	860	18.4	New
Majority		42	0.9	N/A
Turnout		2,341 (est)	61.6	N/A
Registered electors		3,800		
Conservative hold		Swing	N/A	
Conservative hold		Swing	N/A	

- Note 1 (1847): 3,800 registered electors; 4,682 votes cast; minimum possible turnout estimated by dividing votes by 2. To the extent that electors did not use both their votes, the figure will be an underestimate.
- Note 2 (1847): McCalmont's Parliamentary Poll Book classifies Goulburn as a Liberal Conservative and Law as a Peelite for this election.

=== Elections in the 1850s ===
- Death of Law.

By-election, 4 October 1850: Cambridge University
Party	Candidate	Votes	%	±%
Conservative	Loftus Wigram	Unopposed		
Conservative hold				

General election 10 July 1852: Cambridge University (2 seats)
Party	Candidate	Votes	%	±%
Conservative	Henry Goulburn	Unopposed		
Conservative	Loftus Wigram	Unopposed		
Registered electors		4,063		
Conservative hold				
Conservative hold				

- Note (1852): McCalmont's Parliamentary Poll Book classifies Goulburn as a Liberal Conservative for this election.
- Death of Goulburn.

By-election, 11 February 1856: Cambridge University
Party	Candidate	Votes	%	±%
Conservative	Spencer Horatio Walpole	886	67.9	N/A
Whig	George Denman	419	32.1	New
Majority		467	35.8	N/A
Turnout		1,305	28.7	N/A
Registered electors		4,552		
Conservative hold		Swing	N/A	

General election 28 March 1857: Cambridge University (2 seats)
Party	Candidate	Votes	%	±%
Conservative	Spencer Horatio Walpole	Unopposed		
Conservative	Loftus Wigram	Unopposed		
Registered electors		4,552		
Conservative hold				
Conservative hold				

- Appointment of Walpole as Secretary of State for the Home Department.

By-election, 4 March 1858: Cambridge University
Party	Candidate	Votes	%	±%
Conservative	Spencer Horatio Walpole	Unopposed		
Conservative hold				

General election 29 April 1859: Cambridge University (2 seats)
Party	Candidate	Votes	%	±%
Conservative	Charles Jasper Selwyn	Unopposed		
Conservative	Spencer Horatio Walpole	Unopposed		
Registered electors		4,566		
Conservative hold				
Conservative hold				

=== Elections in the 1860s ===
General election 11 July 1865: Cambridge University (2 seats)
Party	Candidate	Votes	%	±%
Conservative	Charles Jasper Selwyn	Unopposed		
Conservative	Spencer Horatio Walpole	Unopposed		
Registered electors		5,184		
Conservative hold				
Conservative hold				

- Appointment of Walpole as Secretary of State for the Home Department.

By-election 11 July 1866: Cambridge University
Party	Candidate	Votes	%	±%
Conservative	Spencer Horatio Walpole	Unopposed		
Conservative hold				

- Appointment of Selwyn as Solicitor General.

By-election 22 July 1867: Cambridge University
Party	Candidate	Votes	%	±%
Conservative	Charles Jasper Selwyn	Unopposed		
Conservative hold				

- Appointment of Selwyn as Judge of the Court of Appeal in Chancery.

By-election 24 February 1868: Cambridge University
Party	Candidate	Votes	%	±%
Conservative	Alexander Beresford Hope	1,931	58.0	N/A
Conservative	Anthony Cleasby	1,400	42.0	N/A
Majority		531	16.0	N/A
Turnout		3,331	64.3	N/A
Registered electors		5,184		
Conservative hold				

General election 16 November 1868: Cambridge University (2 seats)
Party	Candidate	Votes	%	±%
Conservative	Alexander Beresford Hope	Unopposed		
Conservative	Spencer Horatio Walpole	Unopposed		
Registered electors		5,435		
Conservative hold				
Conservative hold				

=== Elections in the 1870s ===
General election 2 February 1874: Cambridge University (2 seats)
Party	Candidate	Votes	%	±%
Conservative	Alexander Beresford Hope	Unopposed		
Conservative	Spencer Horatio Walpole	Unopposed		
Registered electors		5,855		
Conservative hold				
Conservative hold				

=== Elections in the 1880s ===
General election April 1880: Cambridge University (2 seats)
Party	Candidate	Votes	%	±%
Conservative	Alexander Beresford Hope	Unopposed		
Conservative	Spencer Horatio Walpole	Unopposed		
Registered electors		6,161		
Conservative hold				
Conservative hold				

Walpole's resignation caused a by-election.

By-election 23–28 Nov 1882: Cambridge University
Party	Candidate	Votes	%	±%
Conservative	Henry Cecil Raikes	3,491	72.9	N/A
Liberal	James Stuart	1,301	27.2	New
Majority		2,190	45.7	N/A
Turnout		4,792	75.2	N/A
Registered electors		6,371		
Conservative hold		Swing	N/A	

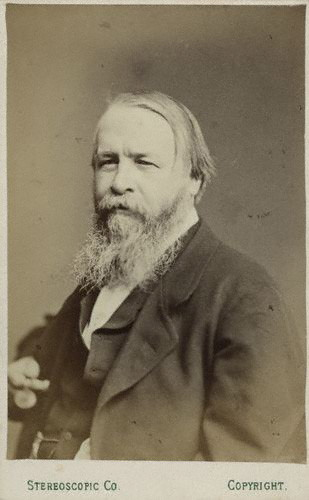
Hope

General election 1885: Cambridge University (2 seats)
Party	Candidate	Votes	%	±%
Conservative	Alexander Beresford Hope	Unopposed		
Conservative	Henry Cecil Raikes	Unopposed		
Conservative hold				
Conservative hold				

General election 1886: Cambridge University (2 seats)
Party	Candidate	Votes	%	±%
Conservative	Alexander Beresford Hope	Unopposed		
Conservative	Henry Cecil Raikes	Unopposed		
Conservative hold				
Conservative hold				

Raikes was appointed Postmaster General, requiring a by-election.

By-election, 13 Aug 1886: Cambridge University
Party	Candidate	Votes	%	±%
Conservative	Henry Cecil Raikes	Unopposed		
Conservative hold				

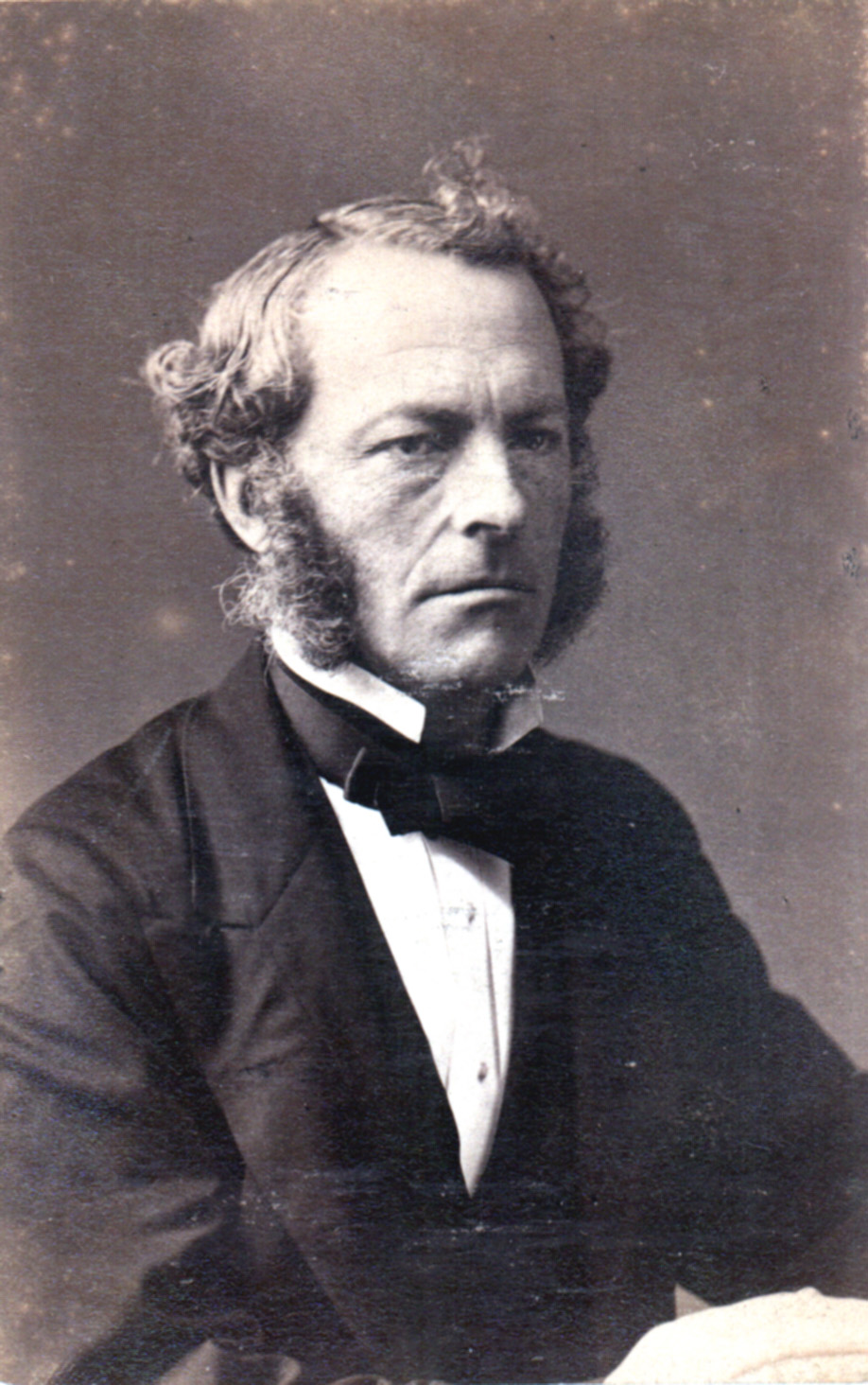
Stokes

Beresford-Hope's death caused a by-election.

By-election, 17 Nov 1887: Cambridge University
Party	Candidate	Votes	%	±%
Conservative	George Stokes	Unopposed		
Conservative hold				

=== Elections in the 1890s ===
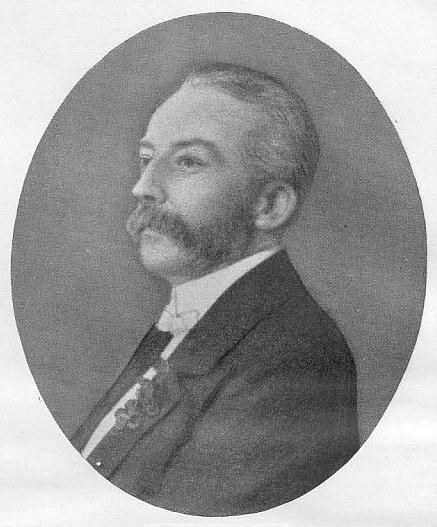
Jebb

1891 Cambridge University by-election
Party	Candidate	Votes	%	±%
Conservative	Richard Claverhouse Jebb	Unopposed		
Conservative hold				

General election 1892: Cambridge University (2 seats)
Party	Candidate	Votes	%	±%
Conservative	Sir John Eldon Gorst	Unopposed		
Conservative	Richard Claverhouse Jebb	Unopposed		
Conservative hold				
Conservative hold				

General election 1895: Cambridge University (2 seats)
Party	Candidate	Votes	%	±%
Conservative	Sir John Eldon Gorst	Unopposed		
Conservative	Richard Claverhouse Jebb	Unopposed		
Conservative hold				
Conservative hold				

=== Elections in the 1900s ===
General election 1900: Cambridge University (2 seats)
Party	Candidate	Votes	%	±%
Conservative	Sir John Eldon Gorst	Unopposed		
Conservative	Richard Claverhouse Jebb	Unopposed		
Conservative hold				
Conservative hold				

General election 1906: Cambridge University (2 seats)
Party	Candidate	Votes	%	±%
Conservative	Samuel Butcher	3,050	39.72	N/A
Conservative	John Rawlinson	2,976	38.76	N/A
Free Trader	Sir John Eldon Gorst	1,653	21.53	New
Majority		1,323	17.23	N/A
Turnout		4,063	65.8	N/A
Registered electors		6,972		
Conservative hold		Swing	N/A	
Conservative hold		Swing	N/A	

=== Elections in the 1910s ===
General election January 1910: Cambridge University (2 seats)
Party	Candidate	Votes	%	±%
Conservative	Samuel Butcher	Unopposed		
Conservative	John Rawlinson	Unopposed		
Conservative hold				
Conservative hold				

General election December 1910: Cambridge University (2 seats)
Party	Candidate	Votes	%	±%
Conservative	Samuel Butcher	Unopposed		
Conservative	John Rawlinson	Unopposed		
Conservative hold				
Conservative hold				

Cox

1911 Cambridge University by-election
Party	Candidate	Votes	%	±%
Conservative	Joseph Larmor	2,308	50.24	N/A
Free Trade	Harold Cox	1,954	42.53	New
Ind. Conservative	Thomas Ethelbert Page	332	7.23	New
Majority		354	7.71	N/A
Turnout		7,129	64.44	N/A
Conservative hold		Swing	N/A	

== Elections 1918–1950 ==
General elections from 1918, when most constituencies polled on the same day, were on different polling days than for territorial constituencies. The polls for university constituencies were open for five days. The elections were conducted by Single Transferable Vote.

=== Elections in the 1910s ===
General election 1918: Cambridge University (2 seats)
Party		Candidate	FPv%	Count	
Party		Candidate	FPv%	1	2
C	Coalition Unionist	John Rawlinson	35.16	2,034	
C	Coalition Unionist	Joseph Larmor	32.69	1,891	1,986
	Independent	William Cecil Dampier	21.09	1,220	1,229
	Labour	J. C. Squire	11.06	640	641
Electorate: 9,282 Valid: 5,785 Quota: 1,929 Turnout: 62.32% C indicates candidate endorsed by the coalition government.

=== Elections in the 1920s ===
General election 1922: Cambridge University (2 seats)
Party	Candidate	Votes	%	±%
Unionist	John Rawlinson	4,192	49.39	+14.23
Independent Liberal	J. R. M. Butler	3,453	39.86	New
Unionist	William Ritchie Sorley	1,018	11.75	New
Majority		2,435	28.11	N/A
Quota		2,888		
Registered electors		13,592		
Turnout		8,663	63.74	
Independent Liberal gain from Unionist		Swing	N/A	

- As two candidates achieved the quota only one count was necessary

General election 1923: Cambridge University (2 seats)
Party	Candidate	FPv%	Count	
Party	Candidate	FPv%	1	2
Unionist	John Rawlinson	40.85	4,207	
Unionist	Geoffrey G. Butler	27.61	2,844	3,560
Independent Liberal	J. R. M. Butler	31.54	3,248	3,283
Electorate: 14,974 Valid: 10,229 Quota: 3,434 Turnout: 68.78%

General election 1924: Cambridge University (2 seats)
Party	Candidate	Votes	%	±%
Unionist	John Rawlinson	4,569	38.60	−2.25
Unionist	Geoffrey G. Butler	4,026	34.01	+6.40
Independent Liberal	J. R. M. Butler	3,241	27.38	−4.16
Majority		785	6.63	
Quota		3,946		
Registered electors		16,621		
Turnout		11,836	71.21	+2.43
Unionist hold		Swing		

- As two candidates achieved the quota only one count was necessary

1926 Cambridge University by-election
Party	Candidate	Votes	%	±%
Unionist	John Withers	Unopposed	N/A	N/A
Unionist hold				

General election 1929: Cambridge University (2 seats)
Party	Candidate	FPv%	Count	
Party	Candidate	FPv%	1	2
Unionist	John Withers	39.76	6,356	
Unionist	Godfrey Wilson	31.71	5,069	6,046
Liberal	Hubert Henderson	19.38	3,099	3,131
Labour	Alexander Wood	9.15	1,463	1,480
Electorate: 23,978 Valid: 15,987 Quota: 5,330 Turnout: 66.67%

=== Elections in the 1930s ===
General election 1931: Cambridge University (2 seats)
Party	Candidate	Votes	%	±%
Conservative	Godfrey Wilson	Unopposed	N/A	N/A
Conservative	John Withers	Unopposed	N/A	N/A
Conservative hold				

1935 Cambridge University by-election
Party	Candidate	Votes	%	±%
Conservative	Kenneth Pickthorn	Unopposed	N/A	N/A
Conservative hold				

General election 1935: Cambridge University (2 seats)
Party	Candidate	Votes	%	±%
Conservative	John Withers	7,602	42.30	N/A
Conservative	Kenneth Pickthorn	6,917	38.49	N/A
Labour	Lionel Elvin	3,453	19.21	New
Majority		3,464	19.28	N/A
Quota		5,991		
Registered electors		33,617		
Turnout		17,972	53.46	N/A
Conservative hold		Swing		

- As two candidates achieved the quota only one count was necessary

=== Elections in the 1940s ===
1940 Cambridge University by-election
Party	Candidate	Votes	%	±%
Ind. Conservative	Archibald Hill	9,840	64.62	New
Independent Progressive	John Ryle	5,387	35.38	New
Majority		4,453	29.24	N/A
Turnout		39,171	38.87	N/A
Ind. Conservative gain from Conservative		Swing		

General election 1945: Cambridge University (2 seats)
Party	Candidate	FPv%	Count			
Party	Candidate	FPv%	1	2	3	4
Conservative	Kenneth Pickthorn	46.18	10,202			
Independent	Wilson Harris	16.18	3,574	4,709	5,185	6,556
Independent Progressive	J. B. Priestley	22.82	5,041	5,128	5,238	5,745
Independent	Charles Hill	10.13	2,238	3,092	3,595	eliminated
National	Ernest Leslie Howard-Williams	4.69	1,036	1,798	eliminated	–
Electorate: 42,012 Valid: 22,091 Quota: 7,364 Turnout: 52.58%

== See also ==
- List of former United Kingdom Parliament constituencies

Parliament of the United Kingdom
Preceded by Appleby	Constituency represented by the prime minister 1784–1801	Succeeded by Devizes
Preceded by Devizes	Constituency represented by the prime minister 1804–1806	Vacant until 1809 Title next held by Northampton
Preceded by Scarborough	Constituency represented by the speaker 1832–1835	Succeeded by Edinburgh
