= Pickthorn baronets =

United Kingdom baronetcy

The Pickthorn Baronetcy, of Orford in the County of Suffolk, is a title in the Baronetage of the United Kingdom. It was created on 31 January 1959 for the Conservative Party politician Kenneth Pickthorn. A former Master of Corpus Christi College, Cambridge, he was member of parliament for Cambridge University from 1935 to 1950, and for Carlton from 1950 to 1966. As of 2010 the title is held by his grandson, the third Baronet James Pickthorn, who succeeded his father, Charles Pickthorn, in 1995. James' eldest son William Pickthorn (born 1998) is the heir to the Pickthorn Baronetcy.

== Pickthorn baronets, Orford, Suffolk (1959) ==
- Sir Kenneth William Murray Pickthorn, 1st Baronet (1892–1975)
- Sir Charles William Richards Pickthorn, 2nd Baronet (1927–1995)
- Sir James Francis Mann Pickthorn, 3rd Baronet (born 1955)

The heir apparent is the present holder's son William Edward Craig Pickthorn (born 1998).
