= Samuel Butcher (classicist) =

Anglo-Irish writer and scholar (1850–1910)

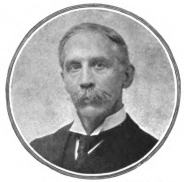
- Portrait of Samuel Butcher, 1911
- Born: Samuel Henry Butcher; 16 April 1850; Dublin, Ireland
- Died: 29 December 1910 (aged 60); London, England
- Occupations: Writer; scholar

Samuel Henry Butcher DCL LLD FRSE FBA (/ˈbʊtʃər/; 16 April 1850 – 29 December 1910) was an Anglo-Irish writer and classical scholar. He was best known for his edition of Homer's Odyssey alongside fellow writer Andrew Lang, which they co-authored in 1879. His edition transformed The Odyssey into prose, similar to Samuel Butler's version in 1900. Although Butler's version is more popular today, Butcher and Lang's version was popular in its time. In addition to being a writer, he was a Professor of Greek at the University of Edinburgh and a politician.

== Life ==
Samuel Henry Butcher was born in Dublin to Samuel Butcher, Bishop of Meath and Mary Leahy.

He was educated at Marlborough College in Wiltshire and then received a place at Trinity College, Cambridge, attending between 1869 and 1873 where he was Senior Classic and Chancellor's medalist. Elected fellow of Trinity in 1874, he left the college on his marriage, in 1876, to the daughter of Archbishop Trench. From 1876 to 1882 he was a fellow of University College, Oxford, and tutored there. From 1882 to 1903 he was Professor of Greek at the University of Edinburgh succeeding Prof John Stuart Blackie. During this period he lived at 27 Palmerston Place in Edinburgh's West End. He was succeeded at the University of Edinburgh by Prof Alexander William Mair.

He was one of the two Members of Parliament for Cambridge University, between 1906 and his death, representing the Conservative Party.

He was President of the British Academy, 1909–1910.

He died in London on 29 December 1910, and his body was returned to Scotland and interred at the Dean Cemetery in Edinburgh with his wife, Rose Julia Butcher (1840-1902). His grave has a pale granite Celtic cross and is located near the northern path of the north section in the original cemetery.

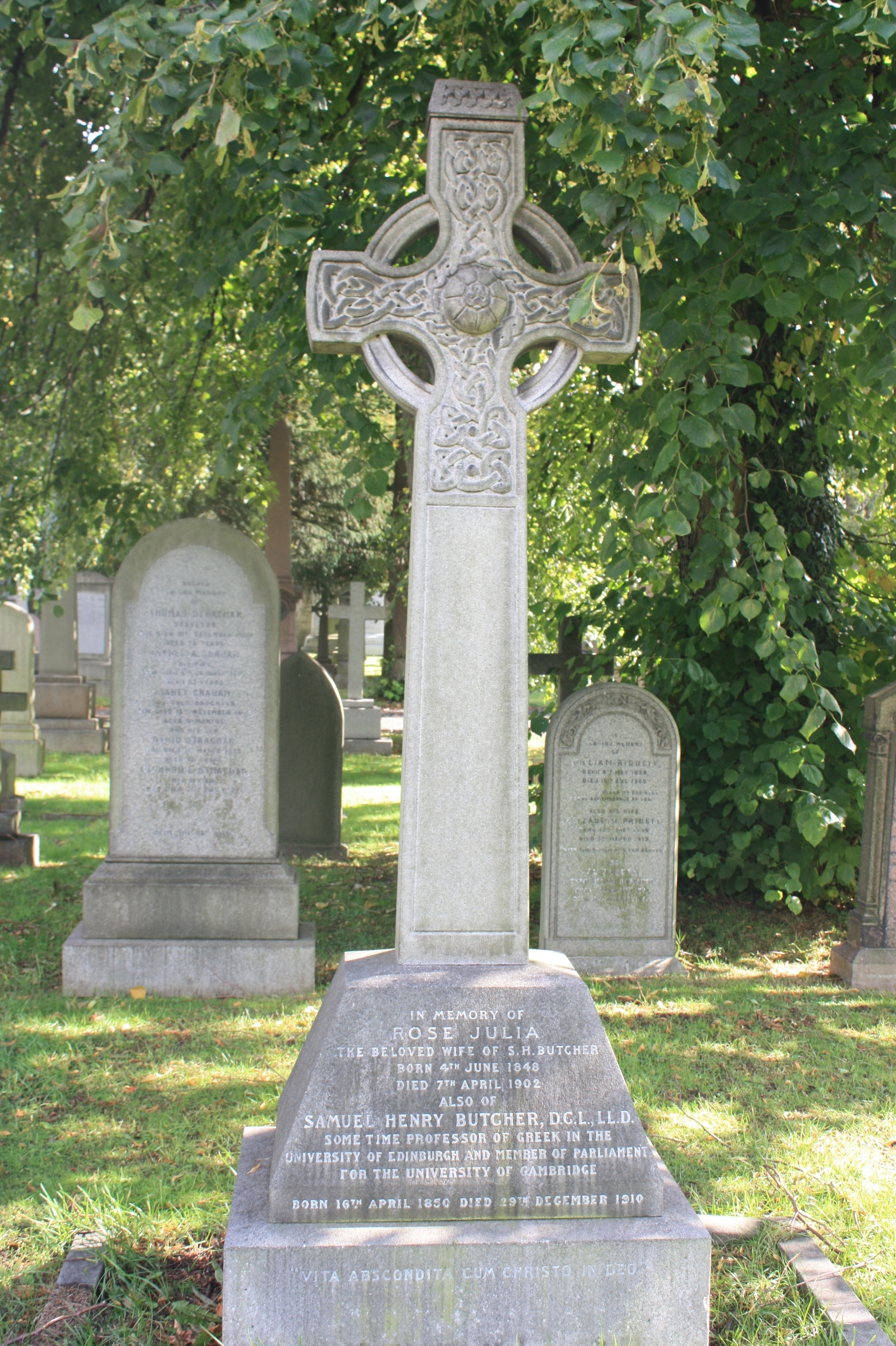
Grave of Samuel Butcher, Dean Cemetery

== Family ==
John Butcher, 1st Baron Danesfort was his younger brother.

He married Rose Julia Trench (1840-1902) in 1876. They had no children.

== Publications ==
His many publications included, in collaboration with Andrew Lang, a prose translation of Homer's Odyssey which appeared in 1879 and the OCT edition of Demosthenes, Orationes, vol. I (Or. 1–19, Oxford, 1903), II.i (Or. 20–26, Oxford, 1907).

Parliament of the United Kingdom
Preceded by Sir Richard Claverhouse Jebb; Sir John Eldon Gorst	Member of Parliament for Cambridge University; 1906 – 1910; With: John Rawlinson	Succeeded by Sir Joseph Larmor; John Rawlinson
