= Joseph Larmor =

Irish theoretical physicist (1857–1942)

Sir Joseph Larmor FRS
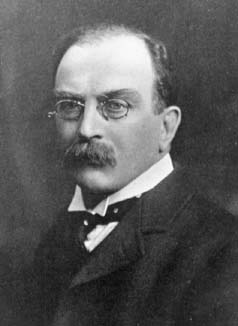
- Larmor, c. 1920

Member of Parliament for Cambridge University
- In office 1911–1922
- Preceded by: Samuel Butcher
- Succeeded by: J. R. M. Butler

Personal details
- Born: 11 July 1857 County Antrim, Ireland
- Died: 19 May 1942 (aged 84) Holywood, Northern Ireland, UK
- Education: Royal Belfast Academical Institution
- Alma mater: Queen's University Belfast (BA, MA); St John's College, Cambridge (MA)
- Known for: Larmor formula; Larmor precession; Time dilation
- Political party: Conservative
- Awards: The William Hopkins Prize (1897); De Morgan Medal (1914); Royal Medal (1915); Poncelet Prize (1918); Copley Medal (1921)
- Scientific career
- Fields: Electromagnetism; Relativistic physics
- Workplaces: Queen's College, Galway (1880–1885); University of Cambridge (1885–1932)
- Academic advisors: John Purser; Edward Routh
- Notable students: Max Born; Sydney Chapman; Ebenezer Cunningham; Bertram Hopkinson; Robert Schlapp

Sir Joseph Larmor (11 July 1857 – 19 May 1942) was an Irish mathematician, theoretical physicist, and British politician who made breakthroughs in the understanding of electricity, dynamics, thermodynamics, and the electron theory of matter. His most influential work was Aether and Matter, a theoretical physics book published in 1900.

== Biography ==
Joseph Larmor was born on 11 July 1857 in Magheragall, County Antrim, the son of Hugh Larmor, a Belfast shopkeeper and his wife, Anna Wright. The family moved back to Belfast, where he was educated at the Royal Belfast Academical Institution, and then studied mathematics and experimental science at Queen's College, Belfast (B.A., 1874; M.A., 1875), where one of his teachers was John Purser. He subsequently studied at St John's College, Cambridge, where in 1880 he was Senior Wrangler (J. J. Thomson was second wrangler that year) and Smith's Prizeman, getting his M.A. in 1883.

After teaching physics for five years at Queen's College, Galway, Larmor accepted a lectureship in mathematics at Cambridge in 1885. In 1903, he was appointed Lucasian Professor of Mathematics, a position he held until his retirement in 1932. He never married. He was knighted by King Edward VII in 1909.

Motivated by his strong opposition to Home Rule for Ireland, in February 1911 Larmor ran for and was elected a Member of Parliament for Cambridge University with the Conservative party. He remained in parliament until the 1922 general election, at which point the Irish question had been settled. Upon his retirement from Cambridge in 1932, Larmor moved back to County Down in Northern Ireland.

Larmor was a plenary speaker in 1920 at the International Congress of Mathematicians (ICM) in Strasbourg. He also was an invited speaker at the ICM in 1924 in Toronto and in 1928 in Bologna.

Larmor died in Holywood, County Down on 19 May 1942 at the age of 84.

== Research ==
Larmor proposed that the aether could be represented as a homogeneous fluid medium which was perfectly incompressible and elastic. Larmor believed the aether was separate from matter. He united Lord Kelvin's model of spinning gyrostats (see Vortex theory of the atom) with this theory. Larmor held that matter consisted of particles moving in the aether. Larmor believed the source of electric charge was a particle (which as early as 1894 he was referring to as the electron). Larmor held that the flow of charged particles constitutes the current of conduction (but was not part of the atom). Larmor calculated the rate of energy (radiation) from an accelerating electron. Larmor explained the splitting of the spectral lines in a magnetic field by the oscillation of electrons.

Larmor also created the first solar system model of the atom in 1897. He also postulated the proton, calling it a "positive electron". He said the destruction of this type of atom making up matter "is an occurrence of infinitely small probability".

In 1919, Larmor proposed sunspots are self-regenerative dynamo action on the Sun's surface.

Quotes from one of Larmor's voluminous work include:

- "while atoms of matter are in whole or in part aggregations of electrons in stable orbital motion. In particular, this scheme provides a consistent foundation for the electrodynamic laws, and agrees with the actual relations between radiation and moving matter".
- "A formula for optical dispersion was obtained in § 11 of the second part of this memoir, on the simple hypothesis that the electric polarization of the molecules vibrated as a whole in unison with the electric field of the radiation".
- “…that of the transmission of radiation across a medium permeated by molecules, each consisting of a system of electrons in steady orbital motion, and each capable of free oscillations about the steady state of motion with definite free periods analogous to those of the planetary inequalities of the Solar System;”
- “'A' will be a positive electron in the medium, and 'B' will be the complementary negative one...We shall thus have created two permanent conjugate electrons A and B; each of them can be moved about through the medium, but they will both persist until they are destroyed by an extraneous process the reverse of that by which they are formed".

=== Discovery of Lorentz transformation ===
Parallel to the development of Lorentz ether theory, Larmor published an approximation to the Lorentz transformations in the Philosophical Transactions of the Royal Society in 1897, namely $x_1 = x \epsilon^{1/2}$ for the spatial part and $dt_1 = dt'\, \epsilon^{-1/2}$ for the temporal part, where $\epsilon = (1 - v^2/c^2)^{-1},$ and the local time $t' = t - vx/c^2.$ He obtained the full Lorentz transformation in 1900 by inserting $\epsilon$ into his expression of local time such that $t'' = t' - \epsilon vx'/c^2,$ and, as before, $x_1 = \epsilon^{1/2} x'$ and $dt_1 =\epsilon^{-1/2}\,dt''$. This was done around the same time as Hendrik Lorentz (1899, 1904) and five years before Albert Einstein (1905).

Larmor, however, did not possess the correct velocity transformations, which include the addition of velocities law, which were later discovered by Henri Poincaré. Larmor predicted the phenomenon of time dilation, at least for orbiting electrons, by writing (Larmor 1897): "individual electrons describe corresponding parts of their orbits in times shorter for the [rest] system in the ratio (1 – v^{2}/c^{2})^{1/2}". He also verified that length contraction should occur for bodies whose atoms were held together by electromagnetic forces. In his book Aether and Matter (1900), he again presented the Lorentz transformations, time dilation, and length contraction (treating these as dynamic rather than kinematic effects). Larmor was opposed to the spacetime interpretation of the Lorentz transformation in special relativity because he continued to believe in an absolute aether. He was also critical of the curvature of space of general relativity, to the extent that he claimed that an absolute time was essential to astronomy (Larmor 1924, 1927).

== Recognition ==
=== Memberships ===
Country	Year	Institute	Type	Ref.
United Kingdom	1892	Royal Society	Fellow	
United States	1903	American Academy of Arts and Sciences	International Honorary Member	
United States	1908	National Academy of Sciences	International Member	
United Kingdom	1910	Royal Society of Edinburgh	Honorary Fellow	
United States	1913	American Philosophical Society	International Member	

=== Honorary degrees ===
Territory	Year	Institute	Degree	Ref.
United Kingdom	1901	University of Glasgow	Doctor of Laws	
United Kingdom	1903	Trinity College Dublin	Doctor of Science	

=== Chivalric titles ===
Country	Year	Monarch	Title	Ref.
United Kingdom	1909	Edward VII	Knight Bachelor	

=== Awards ===
Country	Year	Institute	Award	Citation	Ref.
United Kingdom	1914	London Mathematical Society	De Morgan Medal		
United Kingdom	1915	Royal Society	Royal Medal	"On the ground of his numerous and important contributions to mathematical and physical science"	
France	1918	French Academy of Sciences	Poncelet Prize	"For the whole of his mathematical work"	
United Kingdom	1921	Royal Society	Copley Medal	"For his researches in mathematical physics"	

== Publications ==
- 1884, "Least action as the fundamental formulation in dynamics and physics", Proceedings of the London Mathematical Society.
- 1887, "On the direct applications of first principles in the theory of partial differential equations", Proceedings of the Royal Society.
- 1891, "On the theory of electrodynamics", Proceedings of the Royal Society.
- 1892, "On the theory of electrodynamics, as affected by the nature of the mechanical stresses in excited dielectrics", Proceedings of the Royal Society.
- 1893–97, "Dynamical Theory of the Electric and Luminiferous Medium", Proceedings of the Royal Society; Philosophical Transactions of the Royal Society. Series of 3 papers containing Larmor's physical theory of the universe.
- 1896, "The influence of a magnetic field on radiation frequency", Proceedings of the Royal Society.
- 1896, "On the absolute minimum of optical deviation by a prism", Proceedings of the Cambridge Philosophical Society.
- Larmor, J. (1897). "A Dynamical Theory of the Electric and Luminiferous Medium. Part III. Relations with Material Media". Philosophical Transactions of the Royal Society A: Mathematical, Physical and Engineering Sciences. 190: 205–493. Bibcode:1897RSPTA.190..205L. doi:10.1098/rsta.1897.0020.
- 1898, "Note on the complete scheme of electrodynamic equations of a moving material medium, and electrostriction", Proceedings of the Royal Society.
- 1898, "On the origin of magneto-optic rotation", Proceedings of the Cambridge Philosophical Society.
- Larmor, J. (1900), Aether and Matter , Cambridge University Press; Containing the Lorentz transformations on p. 174.
- 1903, "On the electrodynamic and thermal relations of energy of magnetisation", Proceedings of the Royal Society.
- 1904, "On the mathematical expression of the principle of Huygens" (read 8 Jan. 1903), Proceedings of the London Mathematical Society, Ser. 2, vol. 1 (1904), pp. 1–13.
- 1907, "Aether" in Encyclopædia Britannica, 11th ed. London.
- 1908, "William Thomson, Baron Kelvin of Largs. 1824–1907" (Obituary). Proceedings of the Royal Society.
- 1921, "On the mathematical expression of the principle of Huygens – II" (read 13 Nov. 1919), Proceedings of the London Mathematical Society, Ser. 2, vol. 19 (1921), pp. 169–80.
- 1924, "On Editing Newton", Nature.
- 1927, "Newtonian time essential to astronomy", Nature.
- 1929, Mathematical and Physical Papers. Cambridge Univ. Press.
- 1937, (as editor), Origins of Clerk Maxwell's Electric Ideas as Described in Familiar Letters to William Thomson. Cambridge University Press.

Larmor edited the collected works of George Stokes, James Thomson, and William Thomson.

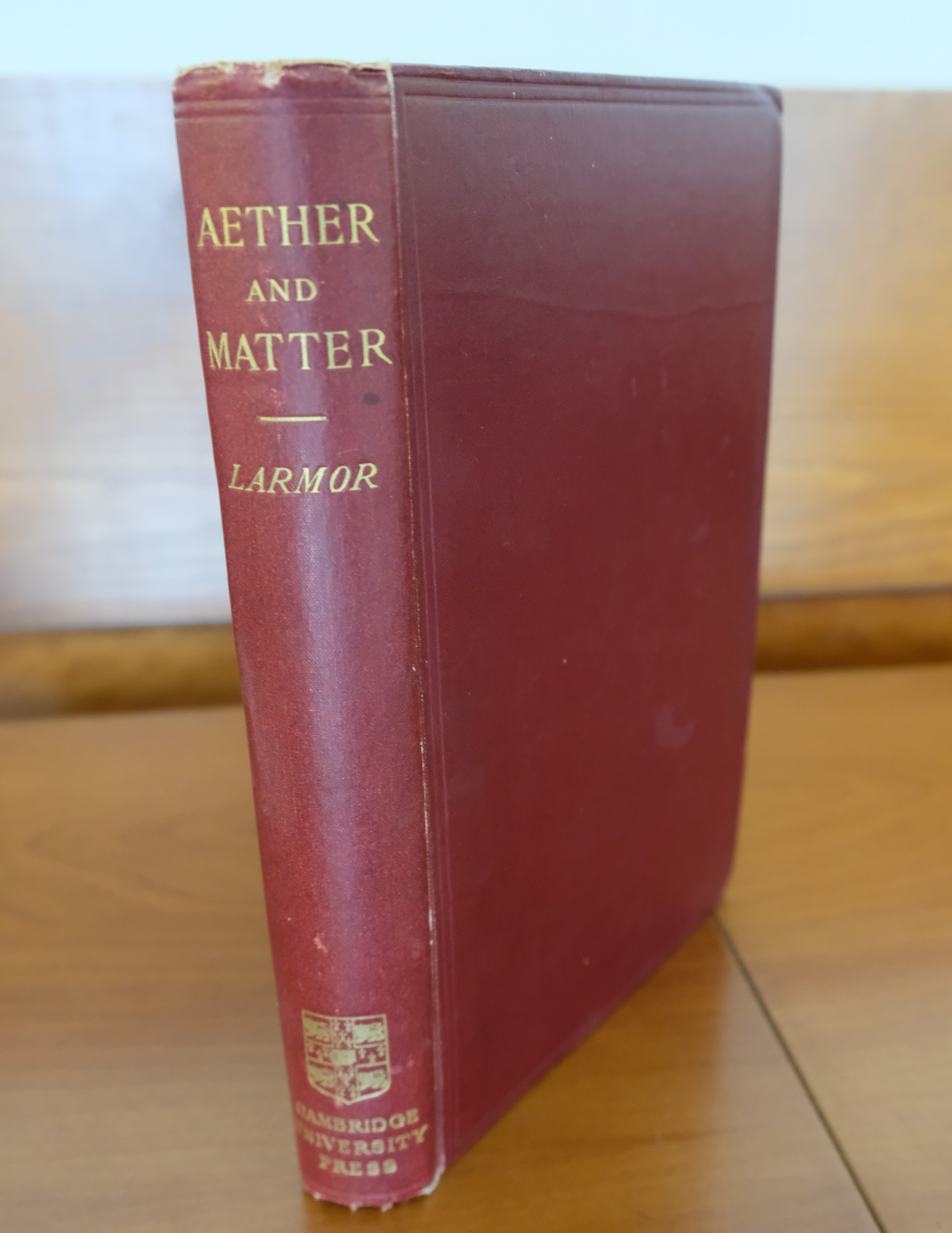
1900 copy of Aether and Matter

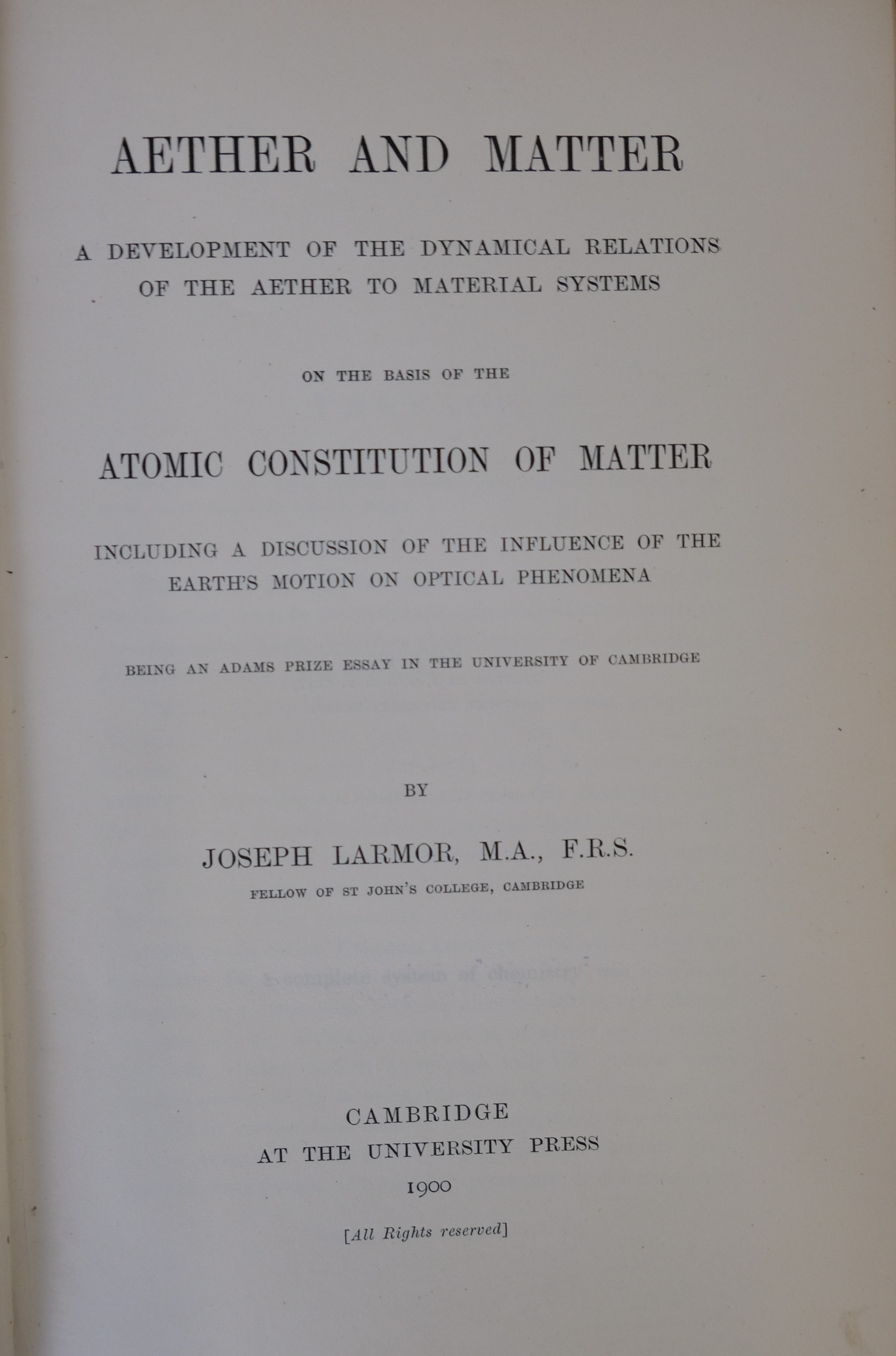
Title page to a 1900 copy of Aether and Matter

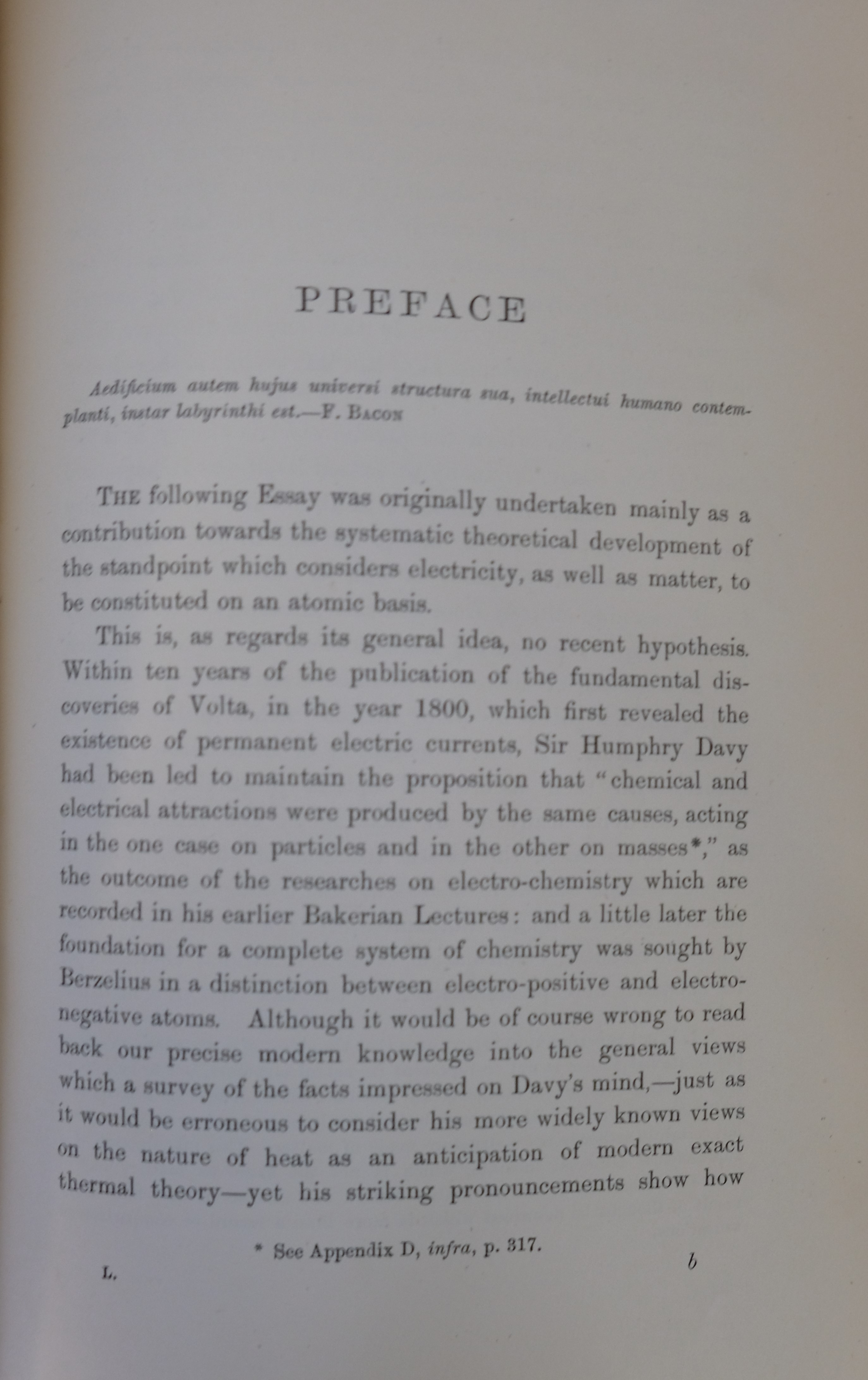
First page of the preface to Aether and Matter

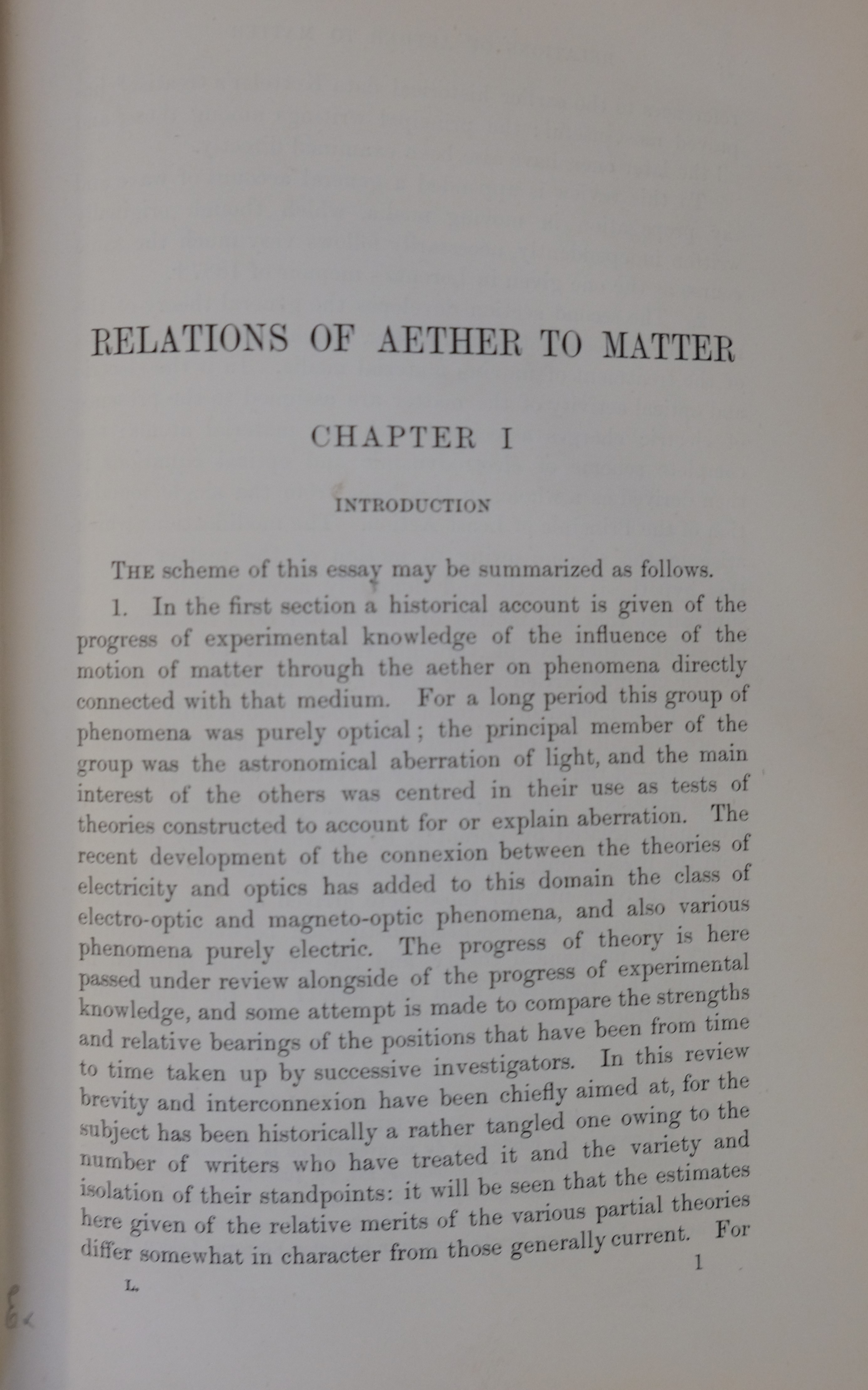
First page of Aether and Matter

== See also ==
- Quotations related to Joseph Larmor at Wikiquote
- History of Lorentz transformations
- Dynamo theory
- Larmor (crater)

Parliament of the United Kingdom
Preceded by Samuel Butcher; John Rawlinson	Member of Parliament for Cambridge University; 1911 – 1922; With: John Rawlinson	Succeeded by J. R. M. Butler; John Rawlinson
