= 1926 Cambridge University by-election =

UK Parliamentary by-election

The 1926 Cambridge University by-election was held on 13 February 1926. The by-election was held due to the death of the incumbent Conservative MP, John Rawlinson. It was won by the Conservative candidate John James Withers, who was unopposed.
