= Thomas Paske (MP) =

English politician

- In office 1710–1720
- Constituency: Cambridge University

Personal details
- Born: 1676
- Died: 18 September 1720 (aged 43–44)
- Party: Tory
- Education: Clare College, Cambridge

Thomas Paske (1676 – 18 September 1720) was a British Tory politician who sat as MP for Cambridge University from 1710 till his death on 18 September 1720.

He was baptised on 18 July 1676, he was the third son of Thomas Paske and Ellen Amye. He was educated at Clare College, Cambridge in 1692, he earned a BA in 1697 and served as fellow from 1699 till 1703 and 1705 till his death. He earned an MA in 1700.
