= John Eldon Gorst =

British politician (1835–1916)

The Right Honourable Sir John Eldon Gorst KC FRS
- Gorst in 1905

Solicitor General for England and Wales
- In office 2 July 1885 – 28 January 1886
- Monarch: Victoria
- Prime Minister: The Marquess of Salisbury
- Preceded by: Sir Farrer Herschell
- Succeeded by: Sir Horace Davey

Under-Secretary of State for India
- In office 4 August 1886 – 9 November 1891
- Monarch: Victoria
- Prime Minister: The Marquess of Salisbury
- Preceded by: Stafford Howard
- Succeeded by: George Curzon

Financial Secretary to the Treasury
- In office 9 November 1891 – 11 August 1892
- Monarch: Victoria
- Prime Minister: The Marquess of Salisbury
- Preceded by: William Jackson
- Succeeded by: Sir J. T. Hibbert

Vice-President of the Committee on Education
- In office 4 July 1895 – 8 August 1902
- Monarchs: Victoria; Edward VII
- Prime Minister: The Marquess of Salisbury; Arthur Balfour
- Preceded by: Arthur Dyke Acland
- Succeeded by: The Duke of Devonshire

Personal details
- Born: 24 May 1835 Preston, Lancashire, England
- Died: 4 April 1916 (aged 80) London, England
- Party: Conservative; Liberal
- Spouse: Mary Elizabeth Moore (m. 1860)
- Education: St John's College, Cambridge

Sir John Eldon Gorst, PC, KC, FRS (24 May 1835 – 4 April 1916) was a British lawyer and politician. He served as Solicitor General for England and Wales from 1885 to 1886 and as Vice-President of the Committee on Education between 1895 and 1902.

== Background and education ==
Gorst was born in Preston, Lancashire, the son of Edward Chaddock Gorst, who took the name of Lowndes on succeeding to the family estate in 1853. He graduated third wrangler from St John's College, Cambridge, in 1857, and was admitted to a fellowship.

== New Zealand ==
After beginning to read for the bar in London, his father's illness and death led to his sailing to New Zealand. The Māori had at that time set up a king of their own in the Waikato district and Gorst, who had made friends with the chief Wiremu Tamihana (William Thomson), known as the kingmaker, established a Māori trade school in Te Awamutu and later acted as an intermediary between the Māori and the government. Sir George Grey made him inspector of schools, then resident magistrate, and eventually civil commissioner in Upper Waikato which the Kingite Māori considered their own land. Tamihana's influence secured his safety at the start of the conflict when chief Rewi Maniapoto of the Ngāti Maniapoto tribe and his warriors attempted to kill Gorst. As Gorst was forewarned they made do by destroying the trade school, destroying a printing press and scaring all the settlers out of the Waikato where they had lived peacefully since 1830. This incident and the ambush and killing of British troops walking along a beach near New Plymouth, led to a restart of the war between the Māori King Movement and the New Zealand government in 1863. In 1884 he hosted the Māori King when he and his party came to England to seek an audience with Queen Victoria over issues to do with land. At that time Gorst was a member of the liberal Aborigine Protection League. In 1908 he published a volume of recollections, under the title of New Zealand Revisited: Recollections of the Days of my Youth.

== Political and legal career ==
Gorst then returned to England and was called to the Bar, Inner Temple, in 1865, becoming a Queen's Counsel in 1875. He stood unsuccessfully for Hastings as a Conservative in the 1865 general election, but the next year he entered parliament as member for Cambridge. He served as chairman of the inaugural meeting of the National Union of Conservative and Constitutional Associations in November 1867. He was not re-elected at the 1868 general election. After the Conservative defeat of that year Benjamin Disraeli entrusted him with the reorganization of the party machinery, and in five years of hard work he paved the way for the Conservative success at the general election of 1874.

At a by-election in 1875 Gorst reentered parliament as member for Chatham, which he continued to represent until 1892. He joined Sir Henry Drummond-Wolff, Lord Randolph Churchill and Arthur Balfour in the Fourth Party as an advocate of Tory democracy. When the Conservatives came to power in 1885 under Lord Salisbury he was made Solicitor General for England and Wales and knighted. The government fell in January 1886 but when the Conservatives returned to office, in July of the same year, he was appointed Under-Secretary of State for India by Salisbury. At the India Office he had a reputation for being competent but obsessed by "his bloody career" (according to an Indian administrator) and for treating his boss Viscount Cross with ill concealed contempt. He was sworn of the Privy Council in 1890 and the following year he became Financial Secretary to the Treasury, a post he held until 1892. Between 1888 and 1891 he also served as deputy chairman of committees in the House of Commons.

At the general election of 1892 Gorst became one of the two members for Cambridge University. On the formation of the third Salisbury administration in 1895 he became Vice-President of the Committee on Education, which he remained until August 1902, when the post was renamed President of the Board of Education. However, he was never a member of the Cabinet. In 1897 he was rumoured to have been the next Governor of New Zealand, although Lord Ranfurly was chosen (and Gorst was said to have twice refused the Cape governorship, a more prestigious position) .

Gorst remained committed to the principles of Tory democracy which he had advocated in the days of the Fourth Party, and continued take an active interest in the housing of the poor, the education and care of their children, and in social questions generally, both in parliament and in the press. However, he became exceedingly independent in his political action. In 1905 he contributed to Robert Morant's dispute concerning a school inspection report by Katherine Bathurst about elementary education for under fives. The report's outspokeness had been encouraged by Gorst who was trying to gain a revenge on Morant. This dispute resulted in Bathurst having to resign and for the ministry publishing her report but (unusually) with Morant's apologies and annotations.

Gorst objected to Joseph Chamberlain's proposals for tariff reform, and at the general election of 1906 he stood as an independent Free Trader, but came third, behind the two official Unionist candidates, and lost his seat. He then withdrew from the vice-chancellorship of the Primrose League, of which he had been one of the founders, on the ground that it no longer represented the policy of Benjamin Disraeli. In 1910 he contested Preston as a Liberal, but failed to secure election.

== Family ==
Gorst married Mary Elizabeth Moore, daughter of Lorenzo Moore, in Geelong in 1860; they had met on the Red Jacket travelling from England to Melbourne. Their elder son, Sir Eldon Gorst, became Consul-General in Egypt. Gorst died in London in April 1916, aged 80, and lies buried in St Andrew's churchyard, Castle Combe, Wilts. An account of his connection with Lord Randolph Churchill will be found in the Fourth Party (1906), by his younger son, Harold Edward Gorst.

His illegitimate older half brother was Edward Frankland.

== Publications ==
- Gorst, Right Hon. Sir John Eldon (1908). New Zealand Revisited: Recollections of the Days of My Youth. Sir Isaac Pitman and Sons.

== Book ==
- Kerry, Simon. Lansdowne: The Last Great Whig (2018), ISBN 9781910787953, OCLC 1043014305, scholarly biography of the 5th Marquess. Online review (Wall Street Journal).

Parliament of the United Kingdom
Preceded by William Forsyth	Member of Parliament for Cambridge; 1866–1868; With: Sir Francis Powell	Succeeded by Robert Richard Torrens; William Fowler
Preceded by George Elliott	Member of Parliament for Chatham; 1875–1892	Succeeded by Lewis Vivian Loyd
Preceded by Sir George Stokes, Bt; Sir Richard Claverhouse Jebb	Member of Parliament for Cambridge University; 1892–1906; With: Sir Richard Claverhouse Jebb	Succeeded by John Rawlinson; Samuel Butcher
Legal offices
Preceded by Sir Farrer Herschell	Solicitor General for England and Wales; 1885–1886	Succeeded by Sir Horace Davey
Party political offices
Preceded by None	Chairman of the National Union of Conservative and Constitutional Associations; 1867	Succeeded by Viscount Holmesdale
Preceded by Markham Spofforth	Principal Agent of the Conservative Party; 1870–1877	Succeeded by William Baillie Skene
Preceded by William Baillie Skene	Principal Agent of the Conservative Party; 1880–1882	Succeeded by George Trout Bartley
Political offices
Preceded by Stafford Howard	Under-Secretary of State for India; 1886–1891	Succeeded by George Curzon
Preceded by William Jackson	Financial Secretary to the Treasury; 1891–1892	Succeeded by Sir J. T. Hibbert
Preceded by Arthur Dyke Acland	Vice-President of the Committee on Education; 1895–1902	Succeeded by The Duke of Devonshire
Academic offices
Preceded by Arthur Balfour	Rector of the University of Glasgow; 1893–1896	Succeeded by Joseph Chamberlain
