= Spencer Horatio Walpole =

British Conservative politician

The Right Honourable Spencer Horatio Walpole QC
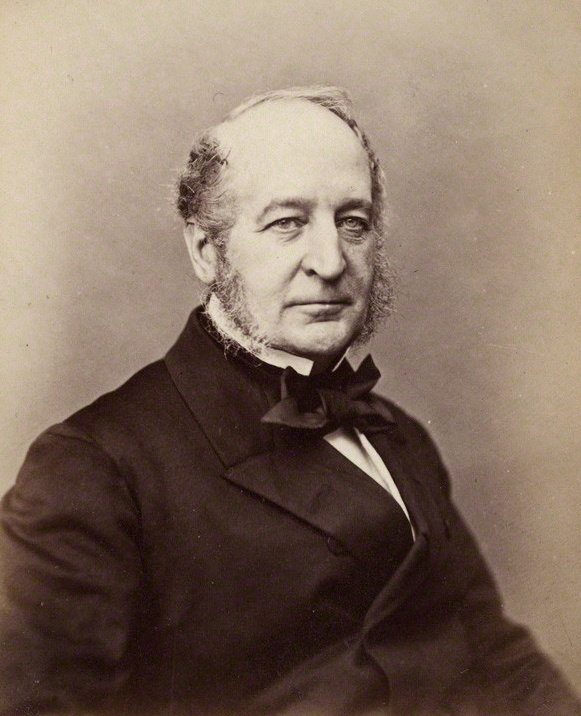

Home Secretary
- In office 6 July 1866 – 17 May 1867
- Prime Minister: The Earl of Derby
- Preceded by: Sir George Grey
- Succeeded by: Gathorne Hardy
- In office 26 February 1858 – 3 March 1859
- Prime Minister: The Earl of Derby
- Preceded by: Sir George Grey
- Succeeded by: T. H. S. Sotheron-Estcourt
- In office 27 February 1852 – 19 December 1852
- Prime Minister: The Earl of Derby
- Preceded by: Sir George Grey
- Succeeded by: The Viscount Palmerston

Personal details
- Born: 11 September 1806
- Died: 22 May 1898 (aged 91)
- Party: Whig; Conservative
- Spouse: Isabella Perceval (m. 1835; died 1886)
- Education: Trinity College, Cambridge

Spencer Horatio Walpole QC (11 September 1806 – 22 May 1898) was a British Conservative Party politician who served three times as Home Secretary in the administrations of Lord Derby.

== Background and education ==
Walpole was the second son of Thomas Walpole and Lady Margaret Perceval, youngest daughter of the 2nd Earl of Egmont and sister of Prime Minister Spencer Perceval. His grandfather was Thomas Walpole, son of the diplomat the 1st Baron Walpole, younger brother of Prime Minister the 1st Earl of Orford. Walpole was educated at Eton and Trinity College, Cambridge. He chose law as his profession, and was called to the Bar, Lincoln's Inn, in 1831. He built up a successful practice and was made a Queen's Counsel in 1846.

== Political career ==
Walpole then turned to politics, and in 1846 he was elected to Parliament for Midhurst as a Tory, a seat he would hold until 1856. He quickly gained a reputation in the House of Commons, and when the Tories came to power in early 1852 under Lord Derby, Walpole was appointed Home Secretary in the so-called "Who? Who? Ministry". He was admitted to the Privy Council at the same time. However, the government fell in December 1852.

In 1854, Walpole was appointed to the Royal Commission for Consolidating the Statute Law, a royal commission to consolidate existing statutes and enactments of English law.

In 1856 Walpole was elected to Parliament for Cambridge University. Two years later the Tories (or the Conservatives as they became known during the 1850s) returned to office under Lord Derby. Walpole was again appointed Home Secretary, but resigned in January 1859 after disagreements over electoral reforms. The government was dismissed in July the same year. The Conservatives remained out of office for seven years, but in 1866 they again came to power under Derby, who made Walpole Home Secretary for the third time. However, he was severely criticised for his handling of the movement for parliamentary reform, and resigned in May 1867. He nonetheless continued to serve in the cabinet as Minister without Portfolio until February 1868, when Benjamin Disraeli became prime minister. Walpole never held office again, but remained a Member of Parliament (MP) for Cambridge University until 1882.

== Family ==
Walpole married his first cousin, Isabella Perceval, daughter of Spencer Perceval, in 1835. They had four children, two sons and two daughters. Their elder son Sir Spencer Walpole was a well-known historian. Walpole died in May 1898, aged 91.

== See also ==
- Baron Walpole and Walpole of Wolterton

== Notes ==
Parliament of the United Kingdom
| Preceded by Sir Horace Seymour | Member of Parliament for Midhurst; 1846–1856 | Succeeded by Samuel Warren |
| Preceded by Henry Goulburn; Loftus Wigram | Member of Parliament for Cambridge University; 1856–1882; With: Loftus Wigram 1856–1859; Charles Jasper Selwyn 1859–1868; Alexander Beresford Hope 1868–1882 | Succeeded by Alexander Beresford Hope; Henry Cecil Raikes |
Political offices
| Preceded by Sir George Grey | Home Secretary; 1852 | Succeeded by The Viscount Palmerston |
| Preceded by Sir George Grey | Home Secretary; 1858–1859 | Succeeded by Thomas Sotheron-Estcourt |
| Preceded by Sir George Grey | Home Secretary; 1866–1867 | Succeeded by Gathorne Hardy |
| Preceded by None | Minister without Portfolio; 1867–1868 | Succeeded by None |
Church of England titles
| Preceded by Henry Goulburn | Third Church Estates Commissioner; 1856–1858 | Succeeded by William Deedes |
| Preceded by William Deedes | Third Church Estates Commissioner; 1862–1866 | Succeeded by Edward Howes |
Honorary titles
| Preceded by William Ewart Gladstone | Senior Privy Counsellor; 1898; With: The Duke of Rutland | Succeeded by The Duke of Rutland |
