= Richard Croftes =

British Member of Parliament (1740–1783)

Richard Croftes (c. 1740 – 1783) was a British politician who sat in the House of Commons between 1767 and 1780.

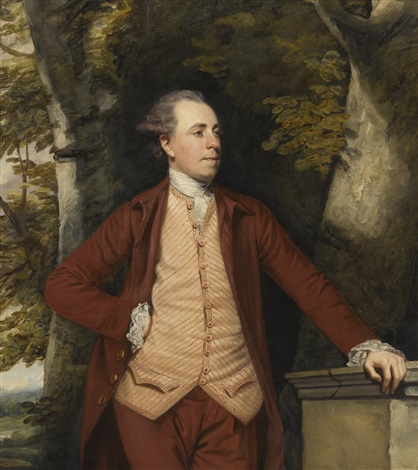
Richard Croftes by Joshua Reynolds

Croftes was the eldest son of William Croftes of West Harling Norfolk and Little Saxham Suffolk and his wife Mary Decker, daughter of Sir Matthew Decker, 1st Baronet MP and a London merchant. He was educated at Eton College from 1753 to 1758, was admitted at St John's College, Cambridge. on 3 July 1758, and graduated MA (Litt) in 1761.

In 1760 Croftes's parents began trying to arrange a seat for him in Parliament. He was on the Duke of Newcastle’s "list of persons to be brought into Parliament" on 9 June 1760, having been mentioned to him by the Duke of Grafton, at the request of Mr Croftes, and by Mr Page at the request of Mrs Croftes. William Croftes was willing to pay for a seat but, found Newcastle's suggestion of Sudbury unattractive because "it would be expensive and the success doubtful". Mrs Croftes wrote to Newcastle on 15 February 1761 that her husband "was willing to have parted with a large sum of money" to have his son returned, and she herself was greatly disappointed that nothing had been arranged: “What objections can your Grace have to serve my son? he is a worthy young man of great application, of good family, and likely to have a good fortune; I flatter myself my son’s behaviour will be such that you will not repent ... bringing him into Parliament.” So in Newcastle's list of people to be brought in, he then appeared as “Mr. Croftes, somewhere with great expense”. Croftes's father asked on 9 March 1761 that he should be brought in for Newark, but this was turned down.

It was not until 1767 that a seat was found for Croftes on Grafton's recommendation. He was returned unopposed as a member of parliament for Petersfield in a by-election on 17 December 1767. At the 1768 general election he transferred to Downton, where he was again returned unopposed. His father died in 1770, and Croftes succeeded to his estates.

In 1771, Grafton, now Chancellor of Cambridge University, suggested that Croftes stand for one of the Cambridge University seats, but the nomination was not well received in the University. The Bishop of Lincoln wrote to Lord Hardwicke on 5 February 1771 "sending down so young a man, and so little known, has given much offence". Richard Watson, regius professor of divinity, wrote to Grafton that the university was dissatisfied with Croftes. "We have no particular objections to him as a private man; nay we believe him equal to transacting the business of Downton, but we by no means think him of consequence enough in life to be the representative, or of ability sufficient to support the interest, of the University of Cambridge". Nevertheless, in January 1771 Croftes vacated his seat at Downton to stand for the University in a by-election on 4 February 1771. Although an independent section of the university put up their own candidate, Croftes was returned by 76 votes against 45.

In the 1774 general election, he held one of the Cambridge University seats unopposed. However, he was defeated at the 1780 general election and did not stand for Parliament again. There is no record of his having spoken in the House of Commons.

Croftes died aged 43 on 4 July 1783 and was buried at West Harling. He had married Harriet Darell, daughter of John Darell on 11 February 1773. They had one daughter.

== See also ==
- Portrait of Richard Crofts Of West Harling, Norfolk by Sir Joshua Reynolds

Parliament of Great Britain
Preceded by John Jolliffe; Richard Pennant	Member of Parliament for Petersfield; 1767 – 1768; With: John Jolliffe	Succeeded by William Jolliffe; Welbore Ellis
Preceded by Thomas Pym Hales; James Hayes	Member of Parliament for Downton; 1768–1771; With: Thomas Duncombe	Succeeded by Thomas Duncombe; James Hayes
Preceded by William de Grey; Thomas Townshend	Member of Parliament for Cambridge University; 1771 – 1780; With: Thomas Townshend; Charles Manners, Marquess of Granby; James Mansfield	Succeeded by Lord John Townshend; James Mansfield
