= 1935 Cambridge University by-election =

UK Parliamentary by-election

The 1935 Cambridge University by-election was held on 23 February 1935. The by-election was held due to the resignation of the incumbent Conservative MP, Godfrey Wilson. It was won by the unopposed Conservative candidate Kenneth Pickthorn.
