= Charles Jasper Selwyn =

English lawyer, judge, and politician

Sir Charles Jasper Selwyn
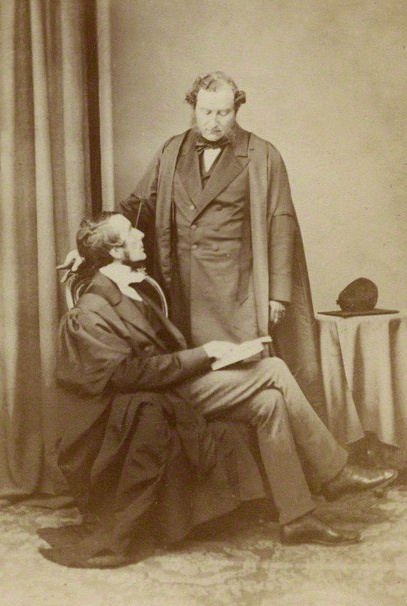
- Sir Charles Jasper Selwyn (standing) with his brother William
- Born: 13 October 1813; Hampstead, Middlesex, England
- Died: 11 August 1869 (aged 55); Richmond, Surrey, England
- Resting place: Nunhead Cemetery, London
- Education: Eton College; Trinity College, Cambridge (BA, MA, LLD)
- Occupations: Judge, politician, barrister
- Years active: 1840–1869
- Employer: Lincoln's Inn
- Political party: Conservative
- Spouses: Hester Ravenshaw (m. 1856; died 1868); Catherine Rosalie Greene (m. 1869)
- Children: 3, including Charles William Selwyn
- Parent: William Selwyn (lawyer)(father)
- Relatives: George Augustus Selwyn (bishop)(brother); William Selwyn (canon)(brother)

Sir Charles Jasper Selwyn PC (13 October 1813 – 11 August 1869) was an English lawyer, politician and Lord Justice of Appeal in Chancery.

== Background and education ==
Selwyn was born at Church Row, Hampstead, Middlesex, the third and youngest son of William Selwyn (1775–1855), and brother of George Augustus Selwyn, Bishop of Lichfield, and of William Selwyn (1806–1875), divine. He was educated at Ealing, Eton, and Trinity College, Cambridge, of which he was successively scholar and fellow. He graduated B.A. 1836, M.A. 1839, and LL.D. 1862.

== Political and legal career ==
Selwyn was called to the Bar, Lincoln's Inn, on 27 January 1840, practised chiefly before the Master of the Rolls, and amassed a large fortune. He served as Commissary to the university of Cambridge from 1855 to 1868, became a Queen's Counsel on 7 April 1856, and in the same year was made a bencher of his inn. He entered parliament as member for Cambridge University in April 1859, and sat for that constituency until 1868. He was a staunch conservative and a churchman. He first spoke in the house on the address to the queen on arming the volunteer corps, and on 13 August 1859 made a speech on a question of privilege connected with the Pontefract election inquiry. In the same month he moved a resolution whereby the committee on the Stamp Duties Bill was enabled to introduce a clause extending probate duty to property exceeding one million in value, and a few months later secured the rejection of Lewis Llewelyn Dillwyn's Endowed Schools Bill.

Selwyn's speech on the motion for the second reading of the Ecclesiastical Commission Bill was considered his best. He spoke for a long time against the bill, and moved an amendment to it. The bill was subsequently withdrawn after a three nights' debate. On 20 February 1861 he divided the house successfully by an amendment to the Trustees of Charities Bill. One of his last speeches was on the Reform Bill of 1867, when he advocated that the lodger franchise should be extended to university lodgers in the town of Cambridge.

Selwyn became Solicitor General in Lord Derby's last administration on 18 July 1867, and was knighted on 3 August. Benjamin Disraeli appointed him a Lord Justice of Appeal on 8 February 1868, and he was named a Privy Counsellor on 28 March.

Selwyn was appointed a Deputy Lieutenant of Surrey in 1860.

== Family ==
Selwyn married, first, in 1856, Hester, fifth daughter of John Goldsborough Ravenshaw, chairman of the East India Company, and widow of Thomas Dowler, M.D. He married, secondly, on 2 April 1869, Catherine Rosalie, daughter of Colonel Godfrey T. Greene, Royal Engineers, and widow of the Reverend Henry Dupuis, vicar of Richmond. He had a son, Charles William Selwyn (1858 - 1893) and two daughters, Edith Adriana Selwyn (1859-1910, married Edward Grant Fraser-Tytler) and Beatrice Eugénie Selwyn (1865-1898, married Patrick Herbert). His widow Catherine married Francis Hughes-Hallett in 1871.

Selwyn, in conjunction with L. F. Selwyn, wrote in 1847 Annals of the Diocese of New Zealand. He died at Pagoda House, Richmond, Surrey, on 11 August 1869, aged 55, and was buried in Nunhead Cemetery.

== Arms ==
Coat of arms of Charles Jasper Selwyn
Crest Two jambs erect erased Or holding a beacon in pale fired Proper. Escutcheon Argent on a bend cottised Sable three annulets Or within a bordure engrailed Gules. Motto Vixi Liber Et Morar

Parliament of the United Kingdom
Preceded by Loftus Wigram; Spencer Horatio Walpole	Member of Parliament for Cambridge University; 1859–1868; With: Spencer Horatio Walpole	Succeeded by Spencer Horatio Walpole; Alexander Beresford Hope
Legal offices
Preceded by Sir John Burgess Karslake	Solicitor General for England and Wales; 1867–1868	Succeeded by Sir William Brett
