= Godfrey Wilson (politician) =

Australian academic and politician (1871–1958)

Godfrey Wilson OBE

Member of Parliament for Cambridge University
- In office 1929–1935 Serving with Sir John Withers
- Preceded by: Sir George Butler; Sir John Withers
- Succeeded by: Sir Kenneth Pickthorn, Bt; Sir John Withers

Personal details
- Born: Godfrey Harold Alfred Wilson; 29 October 1871 Melbourne, Australia
- Died: 13 July 1958 (aged 86) St Ives, Huntingdonshire, England
- Party: Unionist

Godfrey Harold Alfred Wilson OBE (29 October 1871 – 13 July 1958) was an Australian-born politician and academic at Cambridge University. He was a decorated army officer during World War I, and was MP for the university from 1929 to 1935.

== Life ==
Godfrey Wilson was born in Melbourne, the son of Daniel Wilson. He was educated at Melbourne Grammar School and at the University of Melbourne where he was resident at Trinity College from 1889, and later at Clare College, Cambridge, where he graduated BA as 5th Wrangler in 1895. From 1897 to 1929 he was a Fellow of Clare College. In 1899 he married Margaret Bartlett, eldest daughter of the Rev. John Edward Parker Bartlett, Rector of Barnham Broom. He served in the War Office during World War I, gaining two mentions in the Secretary of State's List for 'valuable services'. In the 1918 New Year Honours, he was made a Member of the Order of the British Empire (MBE) and was later appointed an Officer of the Order. Following the 1919 New Year Honours in which Wilson was promoted from Major to Brevet Lieutenant-Colonel, General Earle stated that:

Lieut.-Colonel Wilson has been concerned in the vast organisation for raising the corps of officers for the army, which now amounts to about a quarter of a million, the whole of which has been dependent on him. It is not too much to say that practically every officer that one sees now has been through his hands.

From 1920 to 1926, he was secretary of Cambridge University's financial board, and served as its treasurer from 1926 to 1929. In 1929, he became Master of Clare, retiring from the mastership in 1939. From 1929 to 1935, he was also an MP for Cambridge University in the House of Commons. He resigned from Parliament on being appointed vice-chancellor of Cambridge University, a position he held from 1935 to 1937.

Parliament of the United Kingdom
Preceded by Sir George Butler; Sir John Withers	Member of Parliament for Cambridge University; 1929–1935; With: Sir John Withers	Succeeded by Sir Kenneth Pickthorn, Bt; Sir John Withers
