= Wilson Harris (journalist) =

Henry Wilson Harris (21 September 1883 – 11 January 1955) was editor of The Spectator from 1932 to 1953, and independent MP for Cambridge University from 1945 to 1950. He was in the last group of University MPs; the seats were abolished by the Representation of the People Act 1948, taking effect in 1950.

Wilson Harris was educated at Plymouth College and St John's College, Cambridge; he was elected president of the Cambridge Union in 1905. As an educationist, he appeared in and narrated Children at School (1937), a Basil Wright documentary, with an uncredited script by journalist Tom Driberg, later a member of parliament.

Before joining The Spectator Harris was active in the League of Nations Union in the UK, writing several pamphlets and books and editing the Union's journal Headway. Some of his articles for the Spectator were collected in a 1943 volume, 99 Gower Street, the address of the magazine's editorial offices.

== Notes ==
Parliament of the United Kingdom
Preceded by Kenneth Pickthorn and Archibald Hill	Member of Parliament for Cambridge University; 1945–1950; With: Kenneth Pickthorn	Constituency abolished
