= John Withers (British politician) =

Sir John James Withers CBE (21 December 1863 – 29 December 1939) was a British politician. He was Conservative Member of Parliament (MP) for Cambridge University from 1926 to 1939.

Withers was a pupil at Eton College, and read law at King's College, Cambridge. He was appointed a Commander of the Order of the British Empire in the 1918 New Year Honours for his efforts during the First World War.

A by-election for one of the Cambridge University seats was held on 13 February 1926, when Withers was returned unopposed. He was knighted in the 1929 Dissolution Honours for political and public service.

He died in office, and was succeeded by Archibald Vivian Hill.

Parliament of the United Kingdom
Preceded by Sir Geoffrey Butler; John Rawlinson	Member of Parliament for Cambridge University; 1926 – 1939; With: Sir Geoffrey Butler 1926–1929; Godfrey Wilson 1929–1935; Sir Kenneth Pickthorn 1935–1939	Succeeded by Sir Kenneth Pickthorn; Archibald Hill
