= Dixie Windsor =

English politician

Member of Parliament for Cambridge University
- In office 1705–1720 Serving with Arthur Annesley, 5th Earl of Anglesey
- Preceded by: Henry Boyle, 1st Baron Carleton
- Succeeded by: Edward Finch

Personal details
- Born: circa. 1673 Gamlingay, Cambridgeshire
- Died: 2 April 1763
- Spouse: Dorothy Windsor (née Slate)
- Parent: Thomas Hickman-Windsor, 1st Earl of Plymouth (father)
- Relatives: Andrews Windsor (brother); Thomas Windsor, 1st Viscount Windsor (brother)

Dixie Windsor (c. 1673 – 20 October 1743) was an English Tory politician who sat as MP for Cambridge University from 1705 till 1727.

He was the son of Thomas Windsor, 1st Earl of Plymouth and his second wife. He married Dorothy, the daughter of Sir Richard Slate.

He was known for his strong support of the Church of England. He frequently acted as a teller for the Tory side on issues including disputed elections, Church security and resistance to aspects of the Union with Scotland.

== Education ==
He was educated at Westminster by 1688 to 1691 and matriculated at Trinity College, Cambridge on 26 June 1691 at the age of 17. In 1695, he earned a bachelor of Arts, became a fellow in 1697 and earned a Master of Arts in 1698.

== Parliamentary career ==
He first won an election in 1705 despite facing fierce opposition, including rumoured threats to take away his commission, from Francis Godolphin, the son of Sidney Godolphin, 1st Earl of Godolphin. In 1707, he lost his military commission, likely due to his stance against the ministry. In 1710, he opposed the impeachment of Dr. Henry Sacheverell. In 1712, he received an Ordnance office but still broke with the ministry by voting against the French commerce bill.

In his later career he aligned with the "Hanoverian Tories" generally Tory but supportive of the Hanoverian succession. He demonstrated firm commitment to the Church, notably by supporting the Schism Act of 1714. Windsor kept his Ordnance post until 1717 and remained a moderate Tory thereafter. He died on 20 October 1743.
