= John Rawlinson (politician) =

English barrister, politician and footballer (1860–1926)

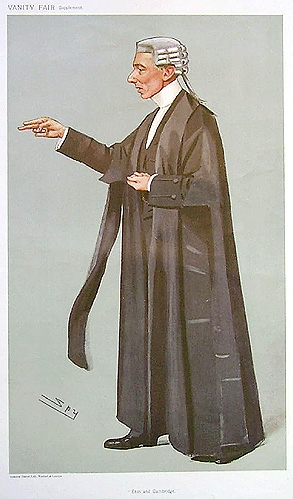
- Rawlinson as caricatured by Spy (Leslie Ward) in Vanity Fair, January 1908

Personal information
- Full name: John Frederick Peel Rawlinson
- Date of birth: 21 December 1860
- Place of birth: Walberton, England
- Date of death: 14 January 1926 (aged 65)
- Place of death: London, England
- Position: Goalkeeper

Senior career*
| Years | Team | Apps | (Gls) |
- Cambridge University
- Old Etonians
- Corinthian
- Wanderers

International career
| 1882 | England | 1 | (0) |
- * Club domestic league appearances and goals

John Frederick Peel Rawlinson (21 December 1860 – 14 January 1926) was an English barrister, politician and footballer. An amateur, he won the FA Cup with Old Etonians in 1882 and made one appearance for England in 1882 playing as a goalkeeper, before serving as a Member of Parliament for Cambridge University from 1906 to 1926.

== Career ==
=== Football ===
The youngest son of Sir Christopher Rawlinson, a former Chief Justice of Madras, John Rawlinson was born in New Alresford, Hampshire and educated at Twyford School, and Eton College, before going up to Trinity College, Cambridge where he won a Cambridge University football "Blue" in 1882 and 1883.

He continued to play for the Old Etonians whilst at university, helping them reach three successive FA Cup finals from 1881 to 1883, losing out 3–0 to Old Carthusians in 1881 and going down to a surprise 2–1 defeat to Blackburn Olympic in 1883. In the 1882 FA Cup Final, he was goalkeeper for the Old Etonians in the final against Blackburn Rovers. According to the match report in Gibbons' "Association Football in Victorian England", after the Old Etonians went 1–0 up by half-time, "Rovers had a couple of chances to level the scores, which were easily dealt with by Rawlinson in the Etonian goal" thus helping the Etonians to claim the cup for the second time in four seasons.

His solitary appearance for England came on 18 February 1882 against Ireland. As goalkeeper, he had little to do as the England forwards ran riot, scoring thirteen goals without reply.

In 1882, he became a member of the committee for the Corinthians and later served on the Football Association committee from 1885 to 1886.

He was also a member of the Wanderers club.

C.W. Alcock described Rawlinson as an "excellent goalkeeper, cool and sure", though he was said to be almost too casual at times.

=== Legal and political career ===
At university Rawlinson was a Prizeman in Common Law and achieved degrees of 1st Class Law Tripos in 1882, LL.B. in 1883, LL.M. in 1887, and honorary LL.D. from the same university in 1920.

He qualified as a barrister and was called to the bar at the Inner Temple in 1884, becoming a QC in 1897, practising on the South-East Circuit. He was a member of the General Council of the Bar from its inception in 1894 and later served as vice-chairman. He was appointed recorder of Cambridge in 1896, and in 1901 became a county Justice of the Peace for Cambridgeshire.

In 1895, he legally represented the Treasury at the government official inquiry into the Jameson Raid in South Africa.

He was elected Conservative Member of Parliament for Cambridge University in 1906 and continued as an MP until his death.

He was co-author with his father of "Rawlinson's Municipal Corporations' Acts" (1883), which became a standard work on the local government laws and went into ten editions.

He was appointed a Privy Counsellor in 1923.

Rawlinson was a school governor of Eton, Malvern and Brighton College, Fellow of Eton College, Honorary Fellow of Pembroke College, Cambridge, and from 1918 Deputy High Steward of Cambridge University.

== Death ==
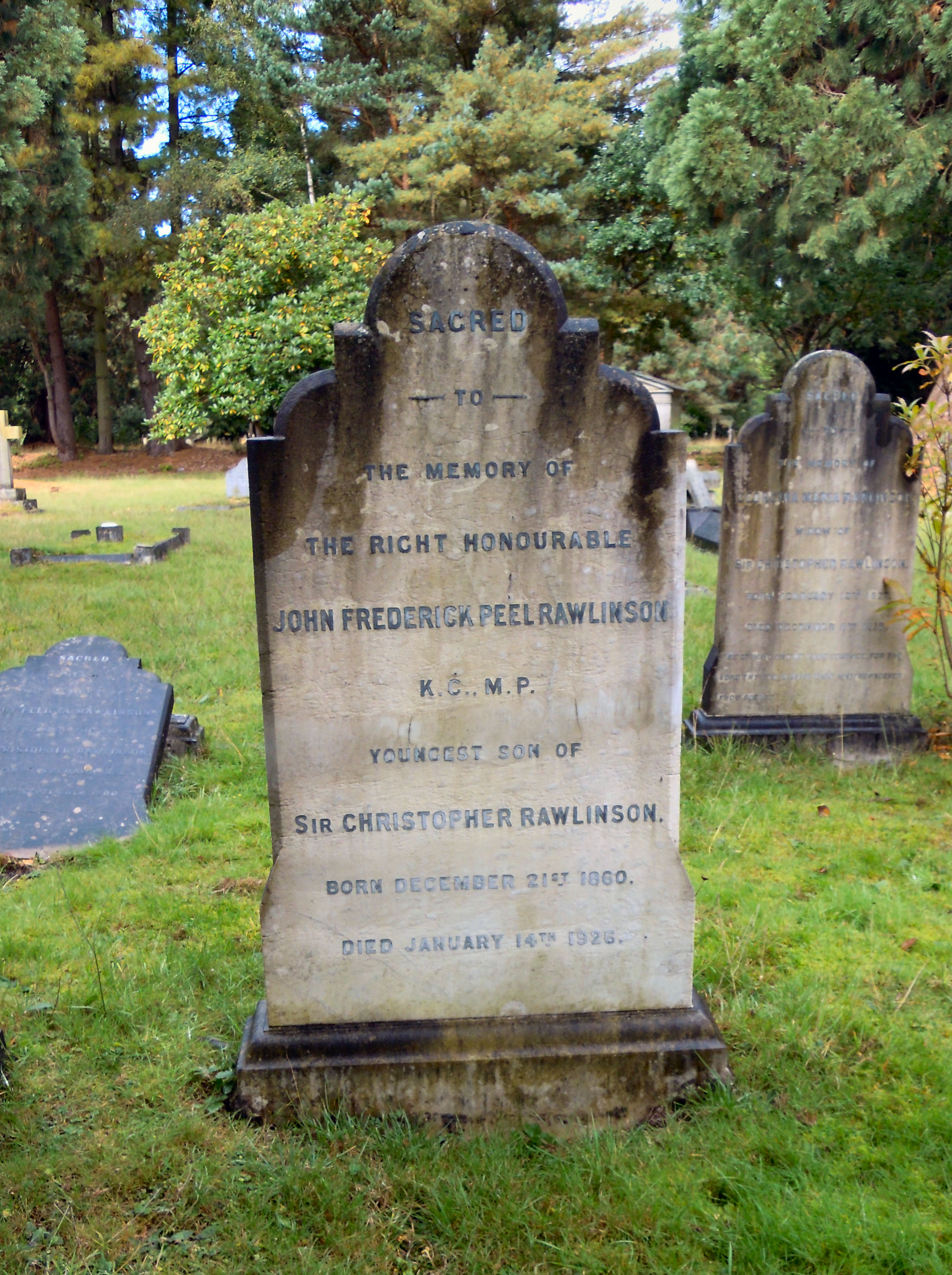
Rawlinson's grave in Brookwood Cemetery

Rawlinson died on 14 January 1926, unmarried, at his chambers in 5 Crown Office Row, Temple, London, after ten days' illness with pleurisy aged 65, and was buried at Brookwood Cemetery, Woking, Surrey.

== Honours ==
=== Football ===
Old Etonians

- FA Cup winner: 1882
- FA Cup finalist: 1881 & 1883

Parliament of the United Kingdom
| Preceded by Sir Richard Claverhouse Jebb; Sir John Eldon Gorst | Member of Parliament for Cambridge University; 1906–1926; With: Samuel Butcher 1906–11; Sir Joseph Larmor 1911–22; J. R. M. Butler1922–23; Sir Geoffrey Butler 1923–26 | Succeeded by Sir Geoffrey Butler; Sir John Withers |
