= Kenneth Pickthorn =

British politician (1892–1975)

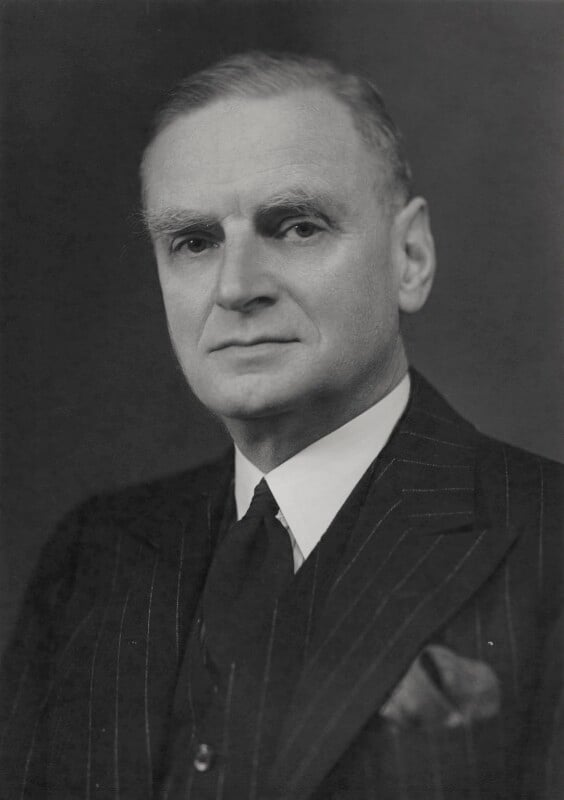
Pickthorn in 1951

Sir Kenneth William Murray Pickthorn, 1st Baronet, PC (23 April 1892 – 12 November 1975) was a British academic and politician.

The eldest son of Charles Wright Pickthorn, master mariner, and Edith Maud Berkeley Murray, he was educated at Aldenham School and at Trinity College, Cambridge.

In World War I he served with the 15th London Regiment and the Royal Air Force in France and Macedonia. He was appointed a Fellow of Corpus Christi College, Cambridge in 1914, serving as dean from 1919 to 1927 and a tutor from 1927 to 1935. He was president of the college from 1937 to 1944.

He served as Conservative member of Parliament (MP) for Cambridge University from 1935 to 1950 and, on the abolition of university constituencies, for the Carlton Division of Nottinghamshire from 1950 to 1966. He served in government as Parliamentary Secretary to the Ministry of Education from 1951 until October 1954.

He was awarded the degree of LittD by Cambridge University in 1936, created a baronet in 1959 and appointed a Privy Counsellor in 1964.

Parliament of the United Kingdom
Preceded by Sir John Withers and Godfrey Wilson	Member of Parliament for Cambridge University; 1935–1950; With: Sir John Withers, to 1940; Dr Archibald Hill, 1940–1945; Wilson Harris, 1945–1950	Constituency abolished
New constituency	Member of Parliament for Carlton; 1950–1966	Succeeded by Philip Holland
Baronetage of the United Kingdom
New creation	Baronet (of Orford, Suffolk); 1959–1975	Succeeded by Charles Pickthorn
