= John Ryle (physician) =

British epidemiologist

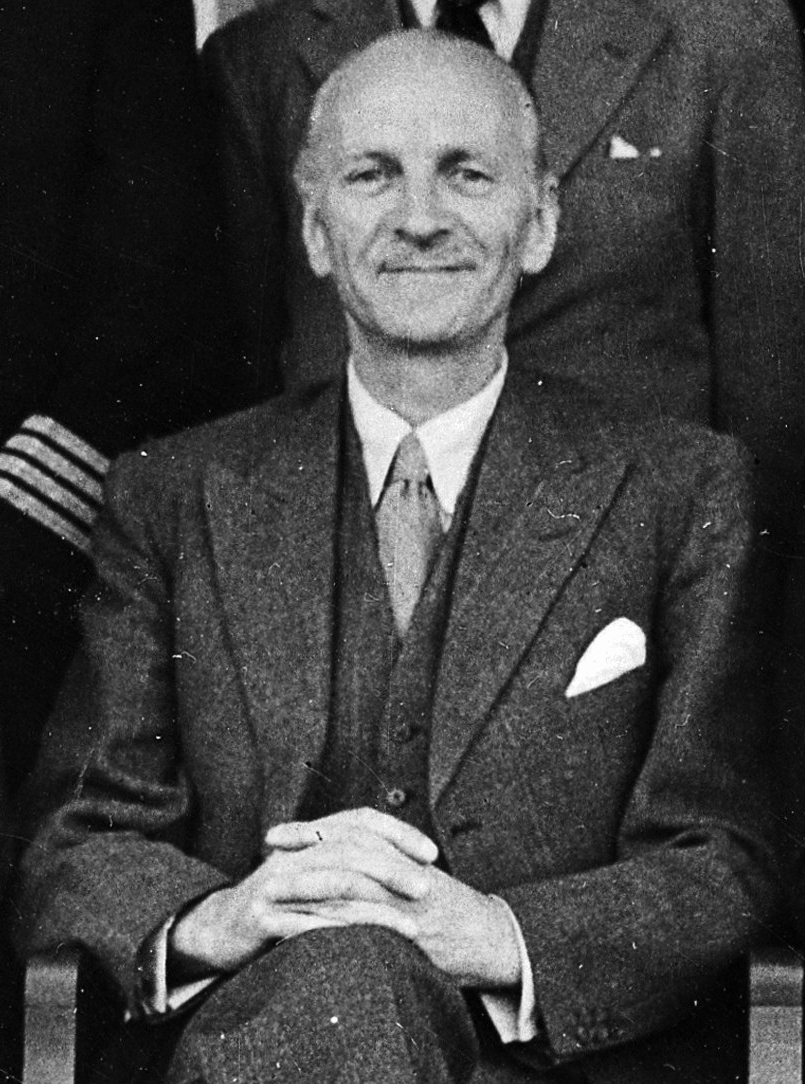
During a British medical mission in Lahore, India in 1944

John Alfred Ryle (1889–1950) was a British physician and epidemiologist.

He was born the son of Brighton medical doctor R J Ryle and brother of the Oxford philosopher Gilbert Ryle. He was educated at Brighton College and Guy's Hospital where he qualified in 1913. He served in the military during World War I and afterwards qualified MD at the University of London. After teaching at Guy's Hospital he was appointed in 1935 Regius Professor of Physic (not Physics; "Physic" here is an archaic term for Medicine) at the University of Cambridge. In 1943 he was appointed chair of the newly created Institute of Social Medicine at the University of Oxford, initiating the academic discipline of Social Medicine (Epidemiology).

He was elected a Fellow of the Royal College of Physicians in 1924 and delivered their Goulstonian Lecture in 1925 and their Croonian Lecture in 1939.

From 1932 to 1936 he was Physician to King George V's household and then Physician Extraordinary to the king.

Ryle was politically active at Cambridge, helping Jewish scholars emigrate from Germany and Austria before World War II. During World War II, he was working at Guy's Hospital to help them prepare for the Blitz. In this capacity he helped the philosopher Ludwig Wittgenstein get a wartime job at Guy's as a porter. In February 1940 he contested the 1940 Cambridge University by-election standing as an Independent Progressive.

Ryle is credited with the discovery of Nasogastric intubation.

He had married Miriam Power Scully in London on 23 October 1914. They had several children, including the astronomer and Nobel laureate Martin Ryle.
