= William Baillie Skene =

William Baillie Skene (24 April 1838 – 10 June 1911) was a British academic and political agent.

The second son of Patrick Skene, of Pitlaw House, Fife, Scotland, William Baillie Skeene was born in Edinburgh in 1838. Educated at Harrow School and Corpus Christi College, Oxford, where he matriculated as an exhibitioner in 1856, he took first-class honours in classical moderations and was elected to a fellowship of All Souls College, Oxford in 1864. He was admitted in 1860 and then called to the bar at Lincoln's Inn in 1863. Skene practiced at the bar for a few years before returning to All Souls as bursar in 1869. As bursar, he guided the college through a period of substantial change, brought about by reforms to the administration of the University and of its colleges.

Skene married Lorina Charlotte Liddell, eldest daughter of Henry Liddell, in 1874, vacating his fellowship by his marriage. In 1876, he became Principal Agent of the Conservative Party, resigning in 1880. In 1886, he became acting treasurer of Christ Church, Oxford, and he remained there as a student (fellow) and treasurer until his resignation in 1910, when he returned to his Scottish home, Pitlour.

Skene was a justice of the peace for Fife and Kinross and a deputy lieutenant for Fife.

== Works ==
- Handbook of Certain Acts Affecting the Universities of Oxford and Cambridge and the Colleges Therein in the Sale, Acquisition and Administration of Property (Sweet & Maxwell, 1898)
