= Thomas Ethelbert Page =

British classical scholar

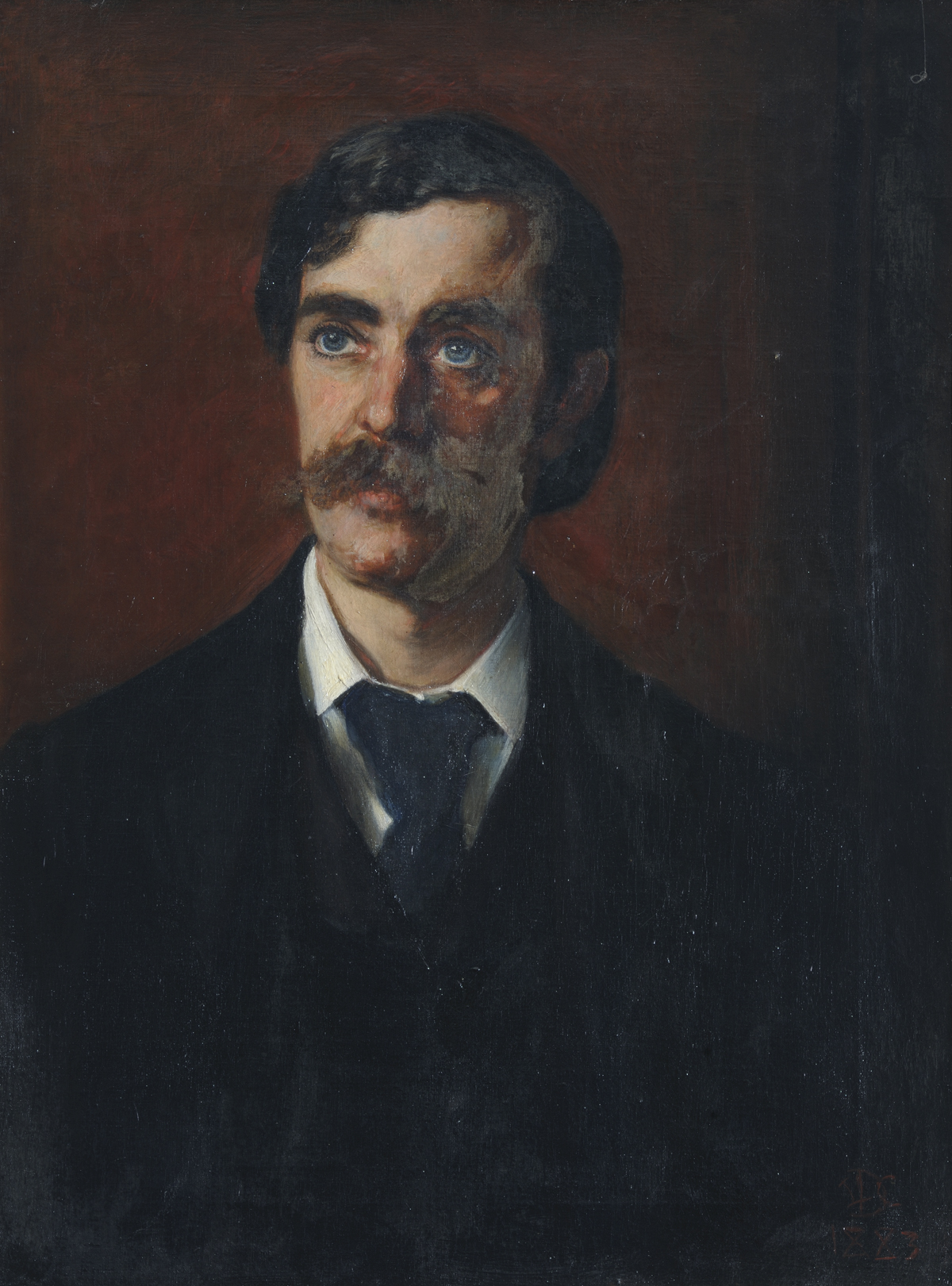
Page in 1883, by Lowes Cato Dickinson

Thomas Ethelbert Page, CH (27 March 1850 – 1 April 1936) was a British classicist and schoolmaster.

== Early life ==
Thomas Ethelbert Page was born in Lincoln, England on 27 March 1850. He was the second son of William Tomlinson Page, the manager of the Lincoln and Lindsey Banking Company, and his wife Anne, whose maiden surname was Watson. He was baptised at St Peter at Arches Church, Lincoln, on 28 April 1850. During the time of the 1851 census, taken on 30 March, Thomas was living with his family at number 18, Salter Gate, Lincoln. He attended Lincoln Grammar School, Shrewsbury School, and St John's College, Cambridge, where he ranked second in Classics in 1873.

== Career ==
After his graduation, Page worked as a sixth-form master at Charterhouse School until 1910. After his retirement, he was appointed as the first editor of the Loeb Classical Library. During his career, he was offered the headships of Harrow and Shrewsbury, as well as the Kennedy Professor of Latin at Cambridge, all of which he turned down.

Page received the LittD from Manchester University in 1913 and was made an honorary Fellow of St John's College in 1931. He was appointed a Member of the Order of the Companions of Honour in the 1934 New Year Honours "for services to scholarship and letters".

Thomas married Delamotte Caroline Eugenie Toynbee, on 16 December 1875 at St George's Hanover Square Church, London. Her father Edward was born in 1825 at Heckington, and was a half-brother of Joseph Toynbee.They had two daughters. He died at a nursing home in Godalming, on 1 April 1936, five days after his 86th birthday.
