= Geoffrey G. Butler =

English historian and politician (1887–1929)

Butler in 1926.

Sir George Geoffrey Gilbert Butler CBE (15 August 1887 – 2 May 1929) was an English historian, academic and politician who served as a Member of Parliament for Cambridge University, 1923–1929.

He was from a prominent family of intellectuals and academics. He was the ninth son of Spencer Perceval Butler and a nephew of Henry Montagu Butler, Master of Trinity College, Cambridge. Three of his brothers were also knighted: Sir Cyril Butler, Sir Montagu Butler, and Sir Harcourt Butler. He was educated at Clifton College and Trinity College, Cambridge, where he won the Chancellor's Medal for English Verse and was elected president of the Cambridge Union Society. He was uncle of and mentor to Rab Butler, and was an early sponsor of Liddell Hart, who, upon the senior Butler's death, said "I have never had a better friend, in every sense of the word."

An avid Conservative, he was a significant figure in the intellectual and political history of his party between the World Wars. In April and May 1917, he was a member of the Balfour Mission, intended to promote cooperation between the US and UK during World War I.
