= List of honorary fellows of Trinity Hall, Cambridge =

This is a list of Honorary Fellows of Trinity Hall, Cambridge.

- Mani Shankar Aiyar
- Waheed Arian
- Sarah Bates
- Sir David Bean
- Sir David Bell
- John Broome
- Sir Roy Calne
- Owen Chadwick
- Jane Clarke
- Peter Clarke
- David Cleevely
- Anna Clunes
- Fiona Cousins
- Sir John Cunningham
- Sir Partha Dasgupta
- Martin Daunton
- Edmund de Waal
- Dame Julia Dias
- John Drury
- Jo Dunkley
- Norman Fowler, Baron Fowler
- Angus Glennie, Lord Glennie
- Sir Narayanan Raghavan Pillai
- Alexander Goehr
- Sir Ewan Harper
- Stephen Hawking
- Mary Hockaday
- Peter Holland
- Sir Anthony Hooper
- Sir Andy Hopper
- Sir Brian Hoskins
- Geoffrey Howe, Baron Howe of Aberavon
- Sir Nicholas Hytner
- Antony Jameson
- Vladimir Kara-Murza
- Sydney Holland, 2nd Viscount Knutsford
- Harriet Lamb
- John H. Langbein
- Janet Legrand
- Sir John Lyons
- Andrew Marr
- Peter Millett, Baron Millett
- Donald Nicholls, Baron Nicholls of Birkenhead
- Peter Oliver, Baron Oliver of Aylmerton
- Paul Orchard-Lisle
- Ronald Oxburgh, Baron Oxburgh
- Cornelia Parker
- Sir John Pethica
- Philip Pettit
- John Polkinghorne
- Emma Pooley
- Tony Purnell
- Sir Colin Rimer
- Graham Ross Russell
- Sir Tom Scholar
- Walter Scott
- Peter Sever
- Jack Simon, Baron Simon of Glaisdale
- Sir Peregrine Simon
- Francis Spufford
- Sir Derek Thomas
- John Thomas, Baron Thomas of Cwmgiedd
- Nigel Thomas
- David Thouless
- Sir Mark Tully
- Sir Terry Waite
- Keith Ward
- Rachel Weisz
- Sir Simon Wessely
