= Jeremy Morris =

British historian, priest and academic

The Reverend Canon Jeremy Morris

Master of Trinity Hall, Cambridge
- In office 2014–2021
- Preceded by: Martin Daunton
- Succeeded by: Mary Hockaday

Personal details
- Born: Jeremy Nigel Morris; 22 January 1960 (age 66)
- Education: Balliol College, Oxford; Clare College, Cambridge; Westcott House, Cambridge
- Occupation: Clergyman and historian

Ecclesiastical career
- Religion: Anglicanism
- Church: Church of England
- Ordained: Deacon (1993); Priest (1994)
- Congregations: Dean of Trinity Hall (2001–10); Dean of Chapel, King's College (2010–14)

Jeremy Nigel Morris (born 22 January 1960) is a British historian, Church of England priest and academic. He specialises in church history. From 2014 to 2021, he was Master of Trinity Hall, Cambridge. Previously, he was Dean of Trinity Hall from 2001 to 2010, and Dean of the Chapel of King's College, Cambridge from 2010 to 2014.

== Early life ==
Morris was born on 22 January 1960 to David and Diana Morris. He read Modern History at Balliol College, Oxford, and graduated Bachelor of Arts (BA) in 1981. He remained at the University of Oxford to undertake post-graduate study, during which he was a temporary lecturer. He was awarded his Doctor of Philosophy (DPhil) degree in 1985. His doctoral thesis, on the impact of urban expansion on the development of Victorian and Edwardian organised religion within the parish and borough of Croydon, was published as a book in 1992.

== Career ==
=== Early career ===
Following his university studies, Morris worked in management consultancy and university administration. From 1985 to 1987, he was a scholarship officer for the Association of Commonwealth Universities. Then, from 1987 to 1990, he was a senior administrative officer at the London School of Economics.

=== Ordination and ministry ===
Morris left his early career in administration to train for the priesthood. In preparation for this, he studied theology at Clare College, Cambridge, graduating Bachelor of Arts (BA) in 1992. whilst being trained for ordination at Westcott House, Cambridge, and completed a Certificate in Theology for Ministry in 1993.

He was ordained a deacon in the Church of England in 1993 and a priest in 1994. He served as a curate at St Mary's Church, Battersea, from 1993 to 1996. On 25 February 2019, he was installed as an honorary canon of Ely Cathedral.

He has held permission to officiate in the Diocese of Ely since 2021. Since May 2022, he has been the Church of England's National Adviser on Ecumenical Relations.

=== Academic career ===
In 1996, Morris returned to academia as director of studies and then vice-principal at Westcott House, Cambridge. Later he was a senior associate of the Cambridge Theological Federation and an affiliated lecturer at the Faculty of Divinity, University of Cambridge. He was dean and fellow of Trinity Hall, Cambridge between 2001 and 2010, and director of studies in theology. He was Dean of Chapel at King's College, Cambridge, from 2010 to 2014. In addition, he was a fellow of the college and director of studies in theology and religious studies.

Morris's early academic work was in the field of modern British religious history, looking in particular at the impact of urbanization and industrialization on religious change. His first book – based on his doctoral thesis – was Religion and Urban Change: Croydon 1840–1914 (1992), and he continues to write on arguments about secularization. His general academic interests also include modern European church history, Anglican theology and ecclesiology (especially High Anglicanism), and the ecumenical movement. His research currently focuses on the social and doctrinal history of the Eucharist in Western Europe since 1800. He was director of the Archbishop's Examination in Theology (the "Lambeth Awards"). He is a former member and deputy chair of the Faith and Order Commission of the Church of England and continues to serve on a number of ecumenical bodies. He has been a visiting lecturer at Cardiff University, the Institute of Theology in Tallinn and the Old Catholic Seminary at the University of Bern. He is also one of the directors of the CRASSH project "The Bible and Antiquity in the Nineteenth Century".

In January 2014, he was elected the 44th Master of Trinity Hall, Cambridge. He took up the appointment in October 2014, in succession to Martin Daunton.

== Controversy ==
In 2019, Morris was brought into controversy over past abuse cases whilst working at Trinity Hall, an educational institution where young students reside on site. A lecturer sexually harassed 10 students and was allowed to return and continue attending certain events, with Morris (as master) issuing the following statement: "In line with the rights and privileges afforded to Emeritus Fellows of the College, Dr Hutchinson will continue to attend certain College events and to exercise his dining rights, but will not attend events primarily aimed at students or alumni except by agreement with the College." This was two years after Morris was quoted in The Guardian and Varsity as recognising the "seriousness and the formal nature" of the complaint. Human rights barrister Charlotte Proudman said, "The college has given fellows a licence to abuse their power with impunity. Women students are not safe in their own colleges"; while The Guardian called it "a gross betrayal to the students", and "a dangerous environment for women students to study".

Two weeks later, The Daily Telegraph reported Morris' announcement that a sexual harasser had resigned from his post. Morris said that he would launch a review into the college's handling of the case.

Following the preliminary hearing of the Independent Inquiry into Child Sexual Abuse within the Church of England, Morris talked about his own sexual harassment:

Back in the 80s, I was slapped on the bottom on several different occasions by a clergyman at the church I attended. I was taken aback, a bit shocked even, but I was unsure what to think. It was in the presence of his partner. Was it simply playful? Was it a kind of advance? It was certainly unwelcome. But I didn't say anything at the time, and now realize I probably should have done. I think I rather minimised the matter, assuming most people would go for the 'he's just being light-hearted' line and it wasn't worth making a fuss. Also, I rather liked him, and didn't want to make things difficult. A common enough reaction, as I realise. But looking back, it's significant I remember distinctly each occasion, and the very fact that I didn't want it to happen and that it was a repeated pattern puts it in a different light today.

In February 2020, Morris stepped aside as Master of Trinity Hall "while an investigation into procedures" was conducted. The college commissioned an independent inquiry led by Gemma White QC which recommended Trinity Hall consider disciplinary action against Morris in relation to his handling of one allegation. Morris resigned as Master in August 2021.

Trinity Hall published the report of Gemma White’s inquiry on 8 September 2022. In response Morris published a statement on his website which included the statement: "I realize that my handling of the allegation made by 'John' was not as thorough as it ought to have been, and for the distress he has suffered as a result of my decisions I am very sorry. I never prejudged this matter, believed I was following the legal advice I had been given, had strong support for my actions from all my senior colleagues bar one…I have learnt from my failure to question the legal advice I received, and I continue to be committed to the safeguarding and well-being of all students. I have always strongly supported Cambridge University's 'Breaking the Silence' initiative. I am also grateful for Gemma White's acknowledgement of the positive contributions she received from people I have supported over the years, including those who presented as survivors of sexual violence."

== Honours ==
In June 2017, Morris was awarded The Lanfranc Award for Education and Scholarship by the Archbishop of Canterbury.

== Publications ==
- Morris, Jeremy (1992). Religion and Urban Change: Croydon 1840–1914. Royal Historical Society Studies in History. Vol. 65. Woodbridge: Boydell. ISBN 0861932226.
- with Sagovsky, Nicholas, eds. (2003). The Unity We Have and the Unity We Seek. London: T & T Clark. ISBN 056708907X.
- — (2005). F. D. Maurice and the Crisis of Christian Authority. Oxford: Oxford University Press. ISBN 0199263167.
- — (2007). The Church in the Modern Age. London: I. B. Tauris. ISBN 9781845113179.
- with Dormor, Duncan, eds. (2007). An Acceptable Sacrifice? – Homosexuality and the Church. London: Society for Promoting Christian Knowledge. ISBN 9780281058518.
- —, ed. (2007). To Build Christ's Kingdom: An F. D. Maurice Reader. London: Canterbury Press Norwich. ISBN 9781853117770.
- — (2016). The High Church Revival in the Church of England: Arguments and Identities. Leiden: Brill. ISBN 9789004326798.
- — (2017). The Oxford History of Anglicanism, Vol. 4: Global Western Anglicanism, c.1910–present. Oxford: Oxford University Press. ISBN 9780199641406.
- — (2022). A People's Church: A History of the Church of England. London: Profile Books. ISBN 978-1-78125-249-9.

Academic offices
Preceded by Martin Daunton	Master of Trinity Hall, Cambridge; 2014–2021	Succeeded by Mary Hockaday
