= Martin Daunton =

British academic and historian

Martin Daunton FRHistS FBA FLSW
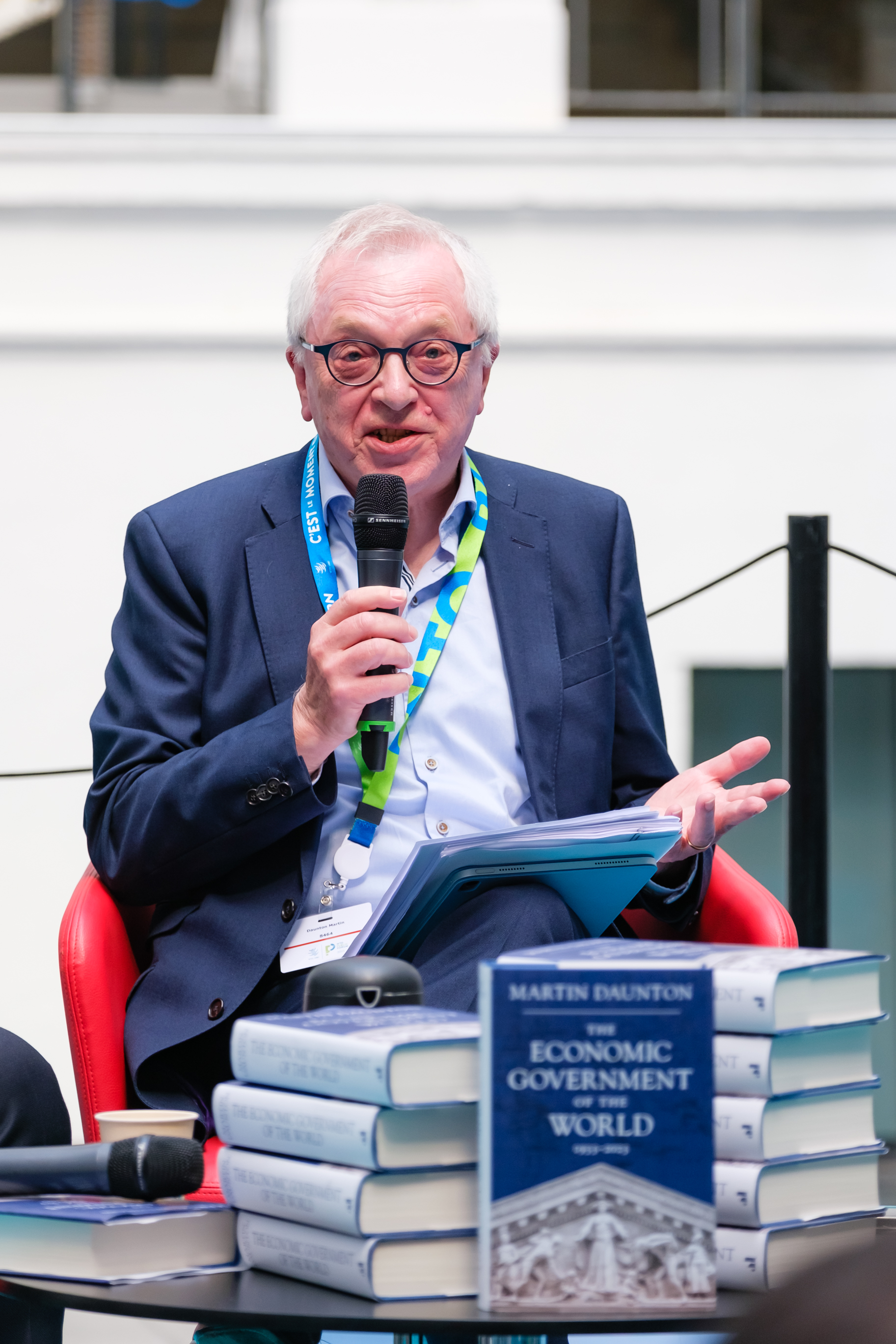
- Born: 7 February 1949 (age 77); Cardiff, Wales
- Spouse: Claire Gobbi (m. 1984)

Academic background
- Education: University of Nottingham; University of Kent; University of Cambridge

Academic work
- Discipline: History
- Sub-discipline: Economic history
- Institutions: University of Durham; University College London; Trinity Hall, Cambridge

Martin James Daunton (born 14 February 1949) is a British academic and historian. He was Master of Trinity Hall, Cambridge, between 2004 and 2014. He was President of the Royal Historical Society from 2005 to 2008.

Daunton is the son of Ronald James Daunton and Dorothy née Bellett. He was educated at Barry Grammar School before going to the University of Nottingham where he graduated with a Bachelor of Arts degree in 1970. He studied further at the University of Kent (PhD, 1974) and received the degree of LittD from the University of Cambridge in 2005.

In 1984, he married Claire Gobbi.

Daunton is a Founding Fellow of the Learned Society of Wales.

== Select bibliography ==
- Coal Metropolis: Cardiff 1870–1914 (Leicester University, 1977). ISBN 9780718511395
- House and home in the Victorian city: working class housing, 1850–1914 (London: Edward Arnold, 1983). ISBN 9780713163841
- Progress and Poverty: an economic and social history of Britain 1700–1850. (Oxford UP, 1995). ISBN 9780198222811
- Daunton, Martin, and Matthew Hilton, eds. The Politics of Consumption: Material culture and citizenship in Europe and America. (Bloomsbury Publishing, 2001). ISBN 9781847881106
- Narlikar, Amrita, Martin Daunton, and Robert M. Stern, eds. The Oxford Handbook on the World Trade Organization (Oxford University Press, 2012). ISBN 9780199586103
- Royal Mail: the Post Office since 1840. (Bloomsbury Publishing, 2015). ISBN 9781474241236
- Housing the Workers, 1850–1914: a comparative perspective (Bloomsbury Publishing, 2015). ISBN 9781474241250
- The Economic Government of the World: 1933-2023 (Farrar, Straus and Giroux, 2023) ISBN 9780374146412

== Select articles ==
- "'Gentlemanly Capitalism' and British Industry 1820–1914." Past & Present 122 (1989): 119–158. in JSTOR
- Moses, Julia, and Martin J. Daunton. "Editorial – Border Crossings: global dynamics of social policies and problems." Journal of Global History 9#2 (2014): 177–188.

Academic offices
Preceded by Peter Clarke	Master of Trinity Hall, Cambridge; 2004–2014	Succeeded by Jeremy Morris
Preceded by Janet Nelson	President of the Royal Historical Society; 2005–2008	Succeeded by Colin Jones
