= Waheed Arian =

British doctor and radiologist (born 1983)

- Born: Waheed Arian; 1983 (age 42–43)
- Education: University of Cambridge; Harvard Medical School
- Occupations: Medical Doctor, radiologist
- Known for: Founder of Arian Teleheal
- Spouse: Davina Arian
- Awards: UNESCO Global Hero Award - 2017; UK Prime Minister's Points of Light Award - 2018; UN Stop TB Global Ambassador - 2019
- Website: Arian Teleheal

Waheed Arian (born 1983) is a British doctor and radiologist, born in Afghanistan, who founded a telemedicine charity called Arian Teleheal. The charity enables doctors in conflict zones and low-resource countries to use their smartphones to receive advice from volunteer specialists in the UK, Canada, the US and other countries. Arian has won several international awards for his achievements, and regularly speaks as an expert in innovation, technology and global health.

== Early life ==
His early childhood was spent during the Soviet-Afghan conflict, his family frequently moving home because of the fighting. His schooling was significantly disrupted as schools were often closed. As the fighting intensified, Arian's parents made the decision to seek safety in Pakistan. His family made a hazardous seven-day mountain crossing, travelling at night to try to avoid Soviet military aircraft. Arian and his father narrowly avoiding being killed during a rocket attack during the crossing. Arian's family eventually reached safety at a Peshawar refugee camp, but conditions were poor and the family of 10 were living in a single room with no running water or electricity. Arian contracted tuberculosis (TB) and malaria, and suffered from malnutrition. He was treated by a volunteer doctor at the camp, who was pivotal in inspiring him to study medicine. Arian's family returned to Kabul following the Soviet withdrawal in 1989. However, the civil war began soon after and, when it intensified in 1999, with Arian aged 15, his parents sent him to safety in the UK, to stay with a distant family friend.

== Arrival in the UK and education (1999–2010) ==
Arian arrived in the UK with US$100 in his pocket, staying with family friends in London initially. He worked in shops to support himself and send money back to his family. Arian began studying at three separate colleges in the evening. With five AS Levels and then three A Levels, all at A grade, Arian was accepted by the University of Cambridge to study medicine at Trinity Hall, but found himself very socially isolated in his two years, his background setting him apart from his fellow students. His main friend was a kitchen porter at the college, with whom he felt he had more in common. Arian subsequently received more support from university and formed links through setting up Afghan and martial arts societies.

He graduated from Cambridge in 2006 with a science degree, and went on to finish his clinical studies at Imperial College London, then winning a scholarship to take an elective in surgery at Harvard Medical School in the US in 2008. Arian has subsequently supported work by Cambridge University to encourage greater diversity in student applications.

== Humanitarian work and establishing Arian Teleheal ==
Working as a NHS doctor in London and then Liverpool, Arian was determined to establish a system by which UK-based medics could help doctors in Afghanistan. He made frequent humanitarian visits to Kabul, Afghanistan, from 2010. In 2014, Arian focused on trying to create safe centres for volunteer medics to stay at in Afghanistan. However, while many were keen to help, they were unwilling to risk travelling to the country.

== Rollout and impact of Arian Teleheal ==
The number of volunteer doctors with Arian Teleheal grew to 100, and the trust was registered as a charity in England and Wales in 2018. The service began supporting the Independent Doctors' Association in Syria, supporting 1.3 million people, both locals and the internally displaced Syrian refugees.

Arian Teleheal also began consultancy support for organisations including the United Nations, the World Health Organization, NHS England and Health Education England, supporting work with South Sudanese refugees (as part of the West Nile Consortium) in Uganda as well as supporting work in South Africa and Yemen.

An audit by the Afghanistan Ministry of Public Health found that, between 2016 and 2019, the advice given by Arian Teleheal volunteer medics had helped local doctors save 686 lives out of 779 life-threatening situations, a success rate of 88%.

With the development of the COVID-19 pandemic, Arian Teleheal's focus switched to supporting local medics in treating patients, including developing guidance for clinical use and advising on the mental health impact of the pandemic, with the Afghan Ministry of Public Health acknowledging this contribution in a letter of thanks.

== Autobiography ==
Arian's autobiography, In the Wars, was published by Penguin on 17 June 2021 with testimonials for the book being provided by Stephen Fry, Khaled Hosseini, John Simpson and Filippo Grandi, the United Nationals High Commissioner for Refugees.

== Awards and recognition ==
Arian has won a number of awards for his innovation and humanitarian work, including:

- UN Stop TB Global Ambassador 2019
- Rotary International Peace Award 2018
- UK Prime Minister's Points of Light Award 2018
- UNESCO Global Hero Award 2017. Arian was the first UK citizen to win this award
- UN Global Goals Goalkeeper 2017
- Inclusion in MIMS Top 5 Philanthropic Doctors 2017
- Recognition as telemedicine pioneer by the British Medical Journal 2016
- Commendation from the President of Afghanistan in 2016
- Highly Commended Rising Star award by the Health Service Journal in 2016

Arian was appointed as a NHS England Clinical Entrepreneur in 2017 and subsequently given the mentor and lecturer role on the National Programme in 2018. He was among staff chosen to attend the Prime Minister's reception to mark the 70th anniversary of the NHS in 2018

== Speaking and presentations ==
Arian has become a regular speaker at national and international conferences and events, discussing innovation and technology through the creation and success of Arian Teleheal, as well as how he overcame the challenges which he has faced in his life. Events include:

- COGX 2019, Europe's largest festival of AI and emerging technology, representing the Bill and Melinda Gates Foundation
- Global Scholars Symposium at Oxford University 2019
- The United Nations General Assembly High Level Meeting on TB 2018
- World Extreme Medicine Conference 2018
- TEDxRoma 2018
- The UN Global Goals in partnership with Gates Foundation Goalkeepers event in 2017, where Arian was also featured as a thought leader in conference video
- UNESCO's Global Hope Coalition event in 2017
- The Royal College of Radiologists Conference 2017
- The first TEDxNHS in 2016
- The Tech4Good event at Google London in 2016

== Career ==
Following his graduation as a medical doctor in 2010, Arian completed Foundation Training from 2010 to 2012 and then Core Surgery Training (Trust Grade) from 2012 to 2014. He did clinical radiology registrar training from 2014 to 2019 while also working as a senior emergency medicine doctor. Arian continues to work as an emergency medicine doctor in the NHS

During his postgraduate medical training, Arian has led and contributed to numerous projects in clinical audit and research, which he has presented in medical conferences and published in scientific journals)

== Media ==
Arian's story has been widely covered in the media, including a 30-minute BBC World documentary by John Simpson, called Waheed's Wars: Saving Lives Across the World, first broadcast in August 2017. This was followed by a 30-minute radio documentary for the BBC World Service called Afghanistan Calling. The documentaries also covered Arian performing world's first augmented reality international telemedicine consultation using Microsoft HoloLens.

Arian has been interviewed by BBC Breakfast, ITN and Channel 5 news, and is a regular interviewee on BBC World and BBC Pashtu, Dari and Persian. UK national newspapers including The Times have featured his story, and there has been significant coverage by regional media in North West England International media coverage includes Voice of America, HuffPost and The Times of India. Specialist coverage of Arian's achievements includes the British Medical Journal and the Royal College of Radiologists Newsletter.

In October 2022, Arian appeared on BBC Radio 4's Desert Island Discs.

== Family ==
Arian is married to Davina, a model. They live in Chester, England.
