= Mary Hockaday =

British journalist

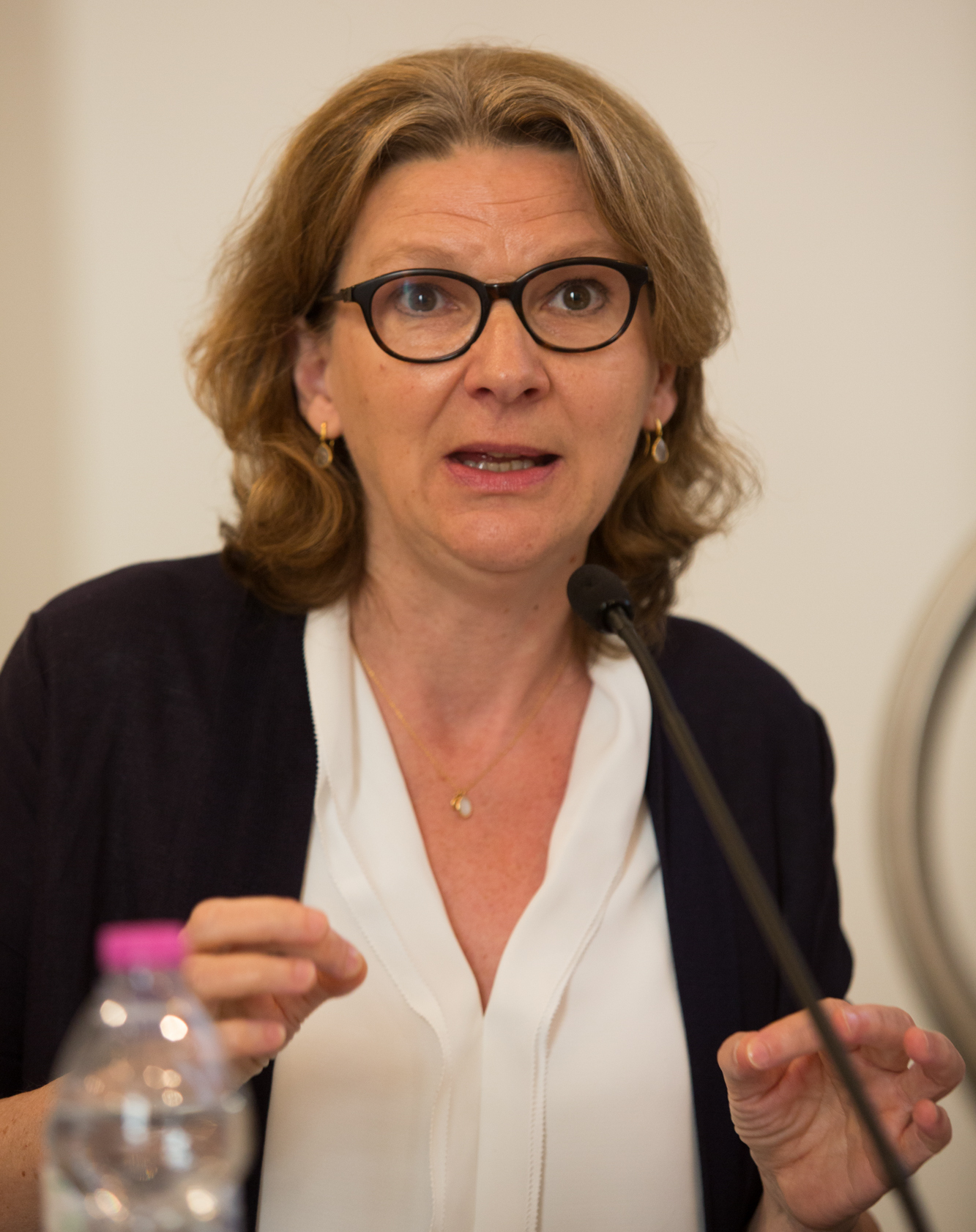
- Hockaday at the International Journalism Festival 2017

Master of Trinity Hall, Cambridge
- Incumbent
- Assumed office 1 October 2022
- Preceded by: Jeremy Morris

Controller of BBC World Service, English
- In office 2014–2021
- Preceded by: Richard Porter
- Succeeded by: Jon Zilkha

Personal details
- Born: Anne Mary Hockaday; 31 May 1962 (age 64) Oxford, England
- Education: Oxford High School
- Alma mater: University of Cambridge; New York University
- Website: www.trinhall.cam.ac.uk/contact-us/contact-directory/fellows-and-academics-directory/mary-hockaday/

Anne Mary Hockaday (born 31 May 1962) is a British journalist and academic administrator. Since October 2022, she has been Master of Trinity Hall, Cambridge. She was previously head of the BBC Multimedia Newsroom, and controller of BBC World Service English.

== Early life ==
Hockaday was born in Oxford, attending Oxford High School, an all-girls private school. She studied English at the University of Cambridge where she was an undergraduate student of Trinity Hall, Cambridge. Then, as a Fulbright Scholar, she studied journalism (MA) at New York University.

== Career ==
She joined the BBC as a World Service production trainee in 1986. She worked as a correspondent in Prague in the early 1990s and as a reporter, editor, producer for World Service news output. She was also the editor of The World Today.

She was the editor of BBC World Service News and Current Affairs (2001–2006), managing daily and weekly news and current affairs output for 9/11, Afghanistan and the Invasion of Iraq. Her department won a special Sony Gold award for its 9/11 coverage.

In 2007, she became deputy head of the BBC Newsroom, leading the On-Demand, Radio and Mediawire teams. In April 2009, she became Head of the Multimedia Newsroom. In October 2014 she was appointed controller of BBC World Service English. She left the BBC in 2021.

On 31 May 2022, it was announced that she was to become the next Master of Trinity Hall, Cambridge, in succession to Jeremy Morris. She took up the post on 1 October 2022.

She serves as director of the Girls' Day School Trust, a group of 25 private schools in the UK and a trustee of the British Library.

Hockaday is the author of a biography of Milena Jesenská, a Czech journalist and muse of Franz Kafka.

Media offices
Preceded by Richard Porter	Controller of BBC World Service, English; 2014 to 2021	Succeeded by Jon Zilkha
Academic offices
Preceded by Jeremy Morris	Master of Trinity Hall, Cambridge; 2022 to present	Incumbent
