= Trinity Hall, Cambridge =

Constituent college of the University of Cambridge in England

Trinity Hall
- University of Cambridge
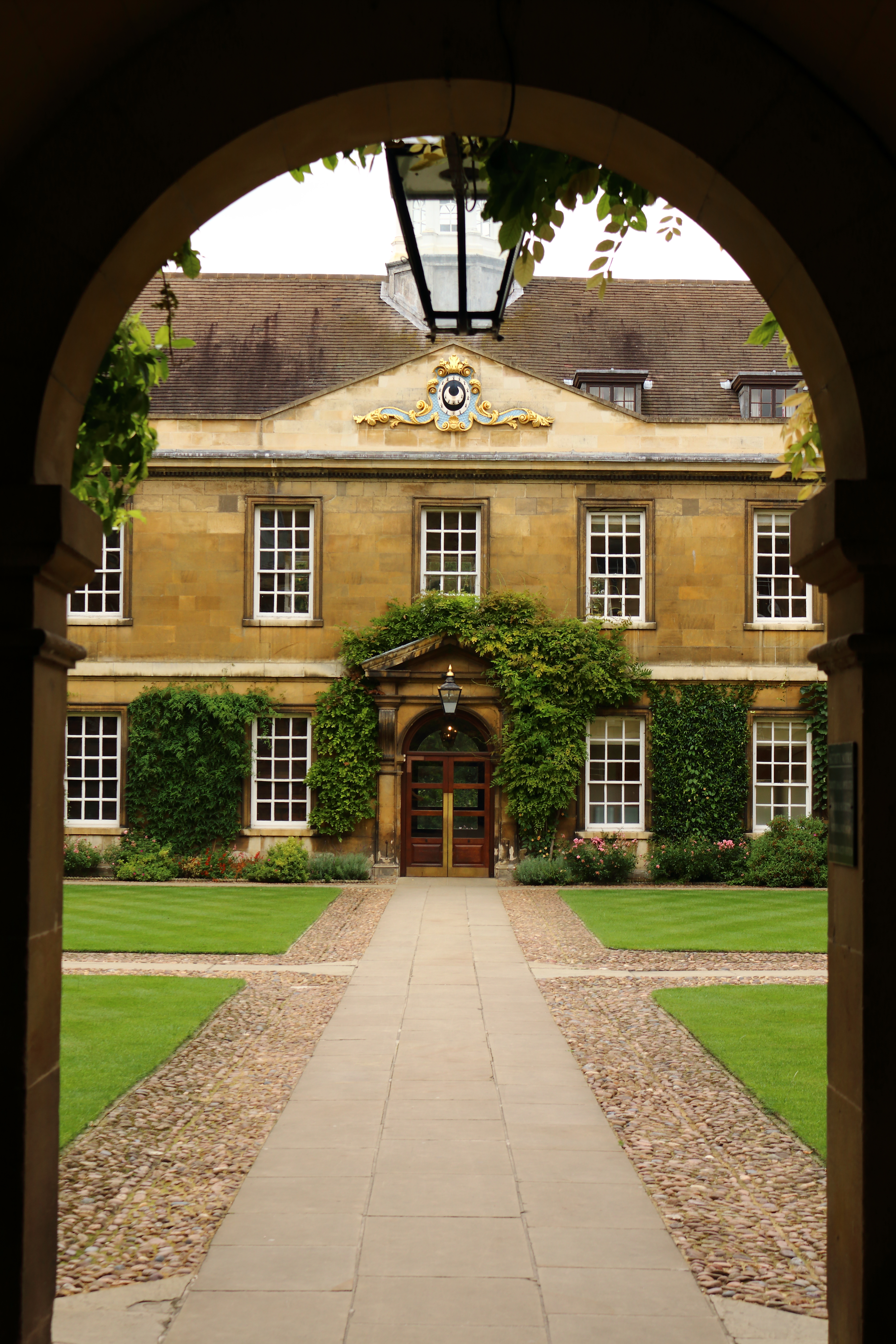
- Front Court at Trinity Hall

- Arms of Trinity Hall; Arms: Sable, a crescent ermine a bordure (engrailed) of the last
Scarf colours: black, with two equally-spaced narrow white stripes
- Location: Trinity Lane (map)
- Coordinates: 52.2057°N 0.1157°E
- Full name: The College or Hall of the Holy Trinity in the University of Cambridge
- Abbreviation: TH
- Founder: William Bateman, Bishop of Norwich
- Established: 1350; 676 years ago
- Named after: The Holy Trinity
- Sister colleges: All Souls College, Oxford; University College, Oxford
- Master: Mary Hockaday
- Undergraduates: 401 (2022–23)
- Postgraduates: 205 (2022–23)
- Fellows: 65 (Note: As at 30 June 2018.)
- Endowment: £89.1 million (2023)
- Website: trinhall.cam.ac.uk
- JCR: jcr.trinhall.cam.ac.uk
- MCR: mcr.trinhall.cam.ac.uk
- Boat club: Trinity Hall Boat Club

Map
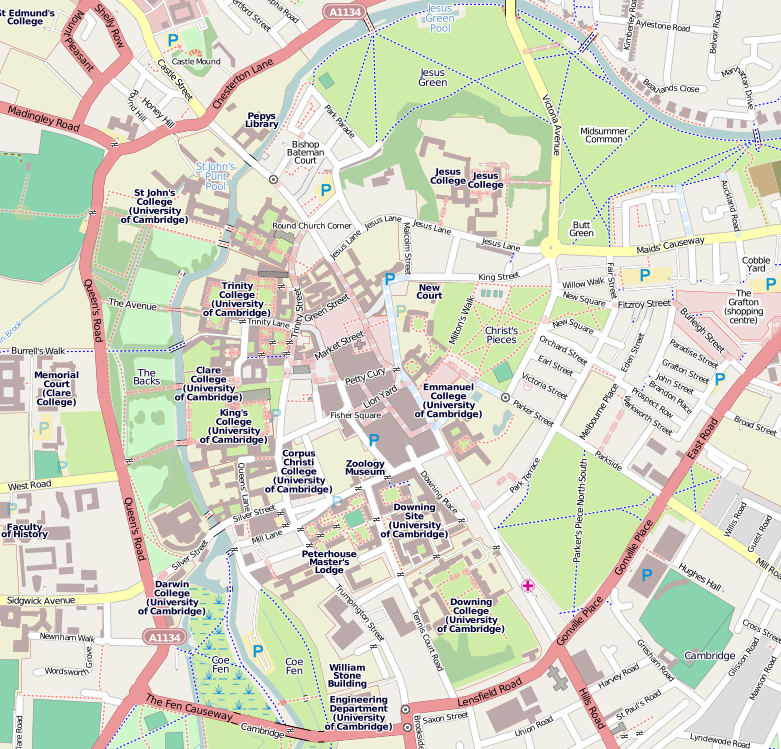
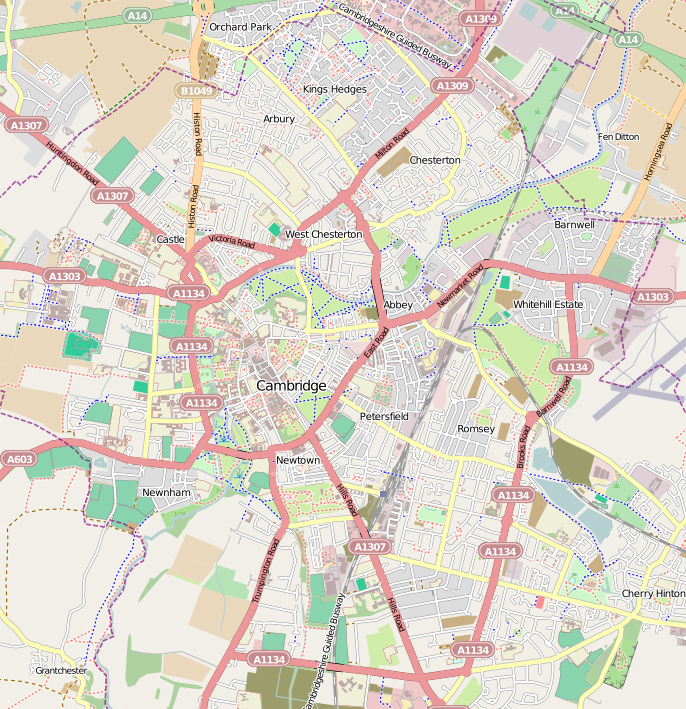
- Location within Central Cambridge Location within Cambridge

Trinity Hall (formally The College or Hall of the Holy Trinity in the University of Cambridge, colloquially "Tit Hall") is a constituent college of the University of Cambridge. It is the fifth-oldest surviving college of the university, having been established in 1350 by William Bateman, Bishop of Norwich, to train clergymen in canon law after the Black Death. The college has two sister colleges at the University of Oxford: All Souls and University College.

The college owns properties in the centre of Cambridge, on Bateman Street and Thompson's Lane, and on its Wychfield site next to Fitzwilliam College, where most of the college's sporting activity takes place. BBC journalist Mary Hockaday became Master in 2022.

Notable alumni include theoretical physicists Stephen Hawking and Nobel Prize winner David Thouless, Australian prime minister Stanley Bruce, Pakistani prime minister Khawaja Nazimuddin, Canadian governor general David Johnston, philosophers Marshall McLuhan and Galen Strawson, Conservative cabinet minister Geoffrey Howe, Charles Howard, 1st Earl of Nottingham, writer J. B. Priestley, violinist George Bridgetower, novelist Ronald Firbank, and Academy Award-winning actress Rachel Weisz.

== History ==
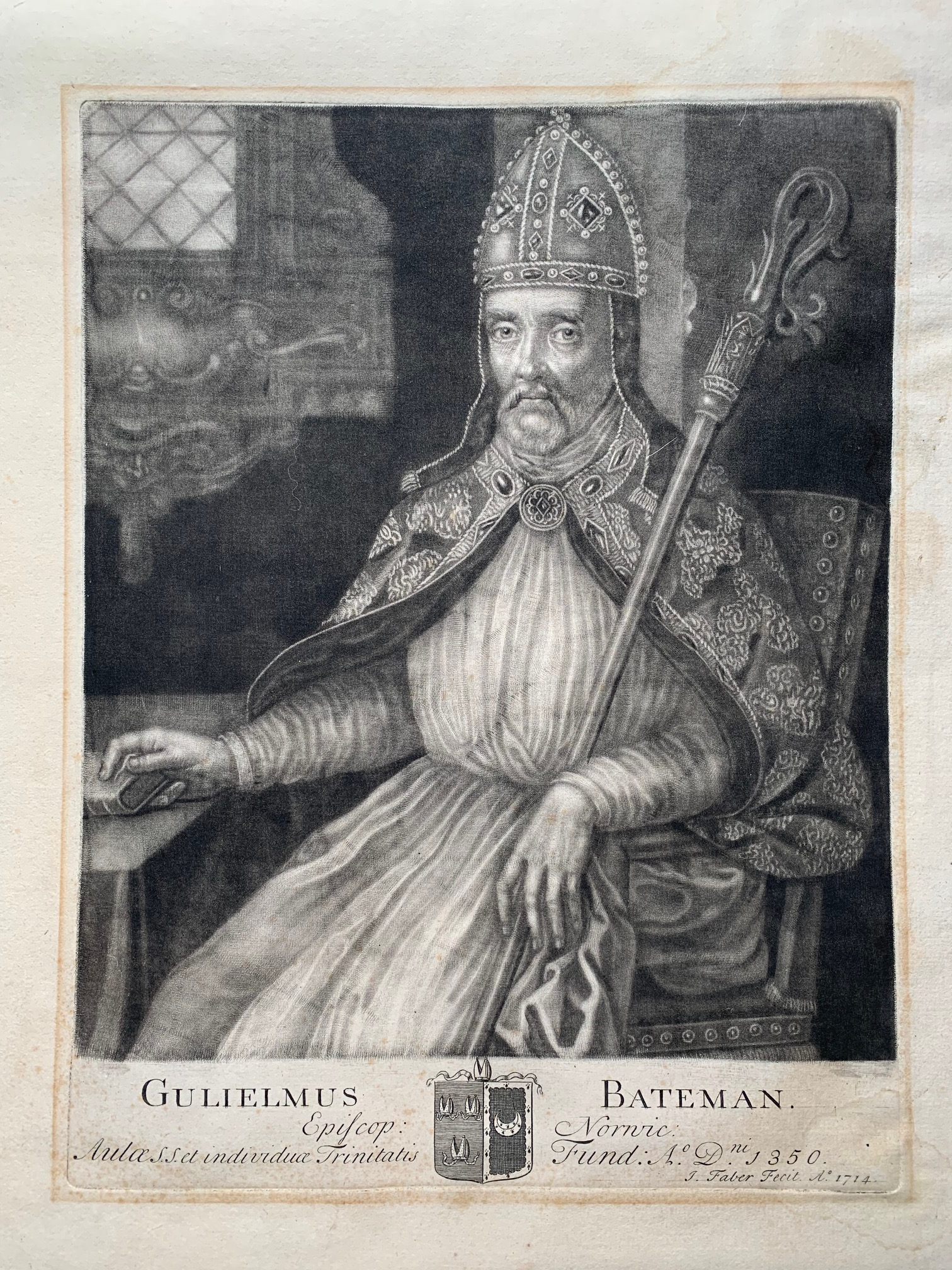
William Bateman (c.1298-1355), Bishop of Norwich and founder of Trinity Hall, as depicted in 1714

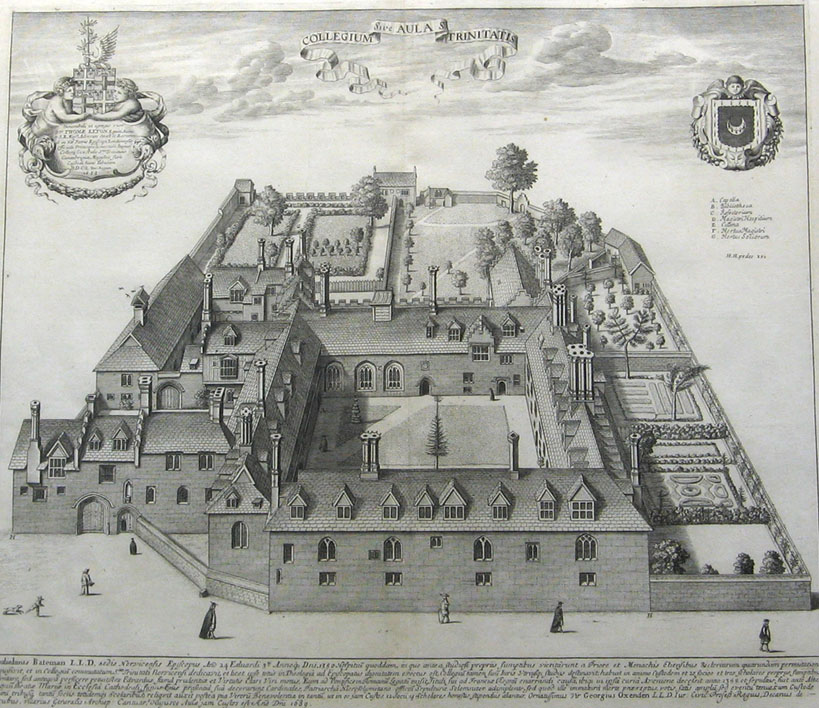
The college as engraved by David Loggan in 1690

=== Foundation and legal heritage ===
The devastation caused by the Black Death in England of the 1340s included the loss of perhaps half of the population; Bishop Bateman himself lost nearly 700 of his parish priests, so one possible motivation to found a college was to rebuild the priesthood. Bateman's vision for his new college was ambitious. He planned to create a college for a Master and 20 Fellows. When Bishop Bateman died suddenly in 1355, he left the College with only a Master, three fellows, and two scholars. That number remained much the same until the 16th century, and it was not until 1952 that his vision was finally realized.

At first all colleges in Cambridge were known as "Halls" or "Houses" and then later changed their names from "Hall" to "College". However, when Henry VIII founded Trinity College next door, it became clear that Trinity Hall would continue being known as a Hall. It is incorrect to call it Trinity Hall College, although Trinity Hall college (lower case) is, strictly speaking, accurate. A similar situation had existed once before when Henry VI founded King's College (in 1441) despite the existence of King's Hall (founded in 1317). King's Hall was later incorporated in the foundation of Trinity College in 1546.

Trinity Hall, in addition to having a chapel, also had joint usage of the Church of St John Zacharias with Clare Hall, until the church was demolished to enable the construction of King's College in the 15th century. After this, the college was granted usage of the nearby Church of St Edward, King and Martyr on Peas Hill, a connection which remains to this day.

Bateman's clerical aim for the Hall is reflected in the foundation of 1350, when he stated that the college's aim was "the promotion of divine worship and of canon and civil science and direction of the commonwealth and especially of our church and diocese of Norwich". This led the college to be particularly strong in legal studies, a tradition that has continued over the centuries. Of the Professors of Civil Law between 1550 and 1600 four were at Trinity Hall, and from 1666 to 1873 two Masters and ten fellows held the professorship without interruption. Before 1856 eight Deans of the Arches and about the same number of Admiralty judges were Hall men.

The poor endowment and the requirement for students to study Law resulted in the college admitting few students. The suppression of the Faculty of Canon Law in 1536 certainly did not help matters. From 1544 for nearly 300 years, the number matriculated each year never rose to ten and was about five on the average, remaining lower than that of any other Cambridge college between 1565 and 1720. The whole number of pensioners was usually about 25 or 30, but often fell to 10 or 15 during the 18th century.

=== Early Modern period ===
The College narrowly avoided amalgamation with Clare College in 1548–9. The Royal Commission proposed the formation of a new College of Civil Law out of the joint revenues of Clare and Trinity Hall. However, it was defeated by the turmoil of the times and the scruples of Bishop Nicholas Ridley who felt guilty about the prospect of dissolving the college of Hugh Latimer.

During the Civil War, Thomas Eden, Master 1625–45, was a firm supporter of the Parliament, signing the Covenant that ensured the fellows and College, including the plate, survived the tumultuous period unscathed. After the Restoration, the College kept away from political controversy.

=== 19th century ===
==== George Bridgetower ====
Polish-born virtuoso violinist George Bridgetower, one of the most famous musical performers of his era, attended the college, earning a Bachelor of Music degree in 1811. He was one of the university's first black students. He had a long-standing friendship with Charles Hague, a fellow of Trinity Hall and the Cambridge Professor of Music, and performed in over 15 public concerts organized by Hague in Cambridge between May 1795 and June 1811. His degree exercise was an anthem performed with full orchestra and chorus at Great St. Mary's on 30 June 1811. The university has offered an essay prize in his name since 2022, awarded in an annual ceremony in Trinity Hall's Bridgetower Room.

==== Land for the Botanic Garden ====
In 1831, Trinity Hall sold 38 acres of land to the University in exchange for £2210 and 7 acres of University land which became Bateman and Norwich Streets. The University planned to use this land to move the Botanic Gardens to its present site, but disputes within the University over the garden's importance and finance, meant that they were only rebuilt on the new site in 1846.

==== Expansion and transformation ====
The establishment of the Law Tripos in 1854, the complete revision of the College statutes in 1860 and 1881, and the energetic tutorship of Henry Latham (1855–85), all combined to transform the College. A strong tradition of legal studies remained, and Roman Law was still prominent in the Law Tripos, but the individual pursuit of different subjects was encouraged. The life of the College became more highly organized. Individuals had taken part in the earliest contests on the river; now the College began to devote itself to the struggle for the headship. The number of resident fellows increased; and the number of undergraduate entries, including a fair sprinkling from overseas, rose rapidly from an average of about 12 around 1850 to an average of nearly 70 around 1890, when Trinity Hall became for a short time the fourth largest College in the University.

=== 20th and 21st Centuries ===
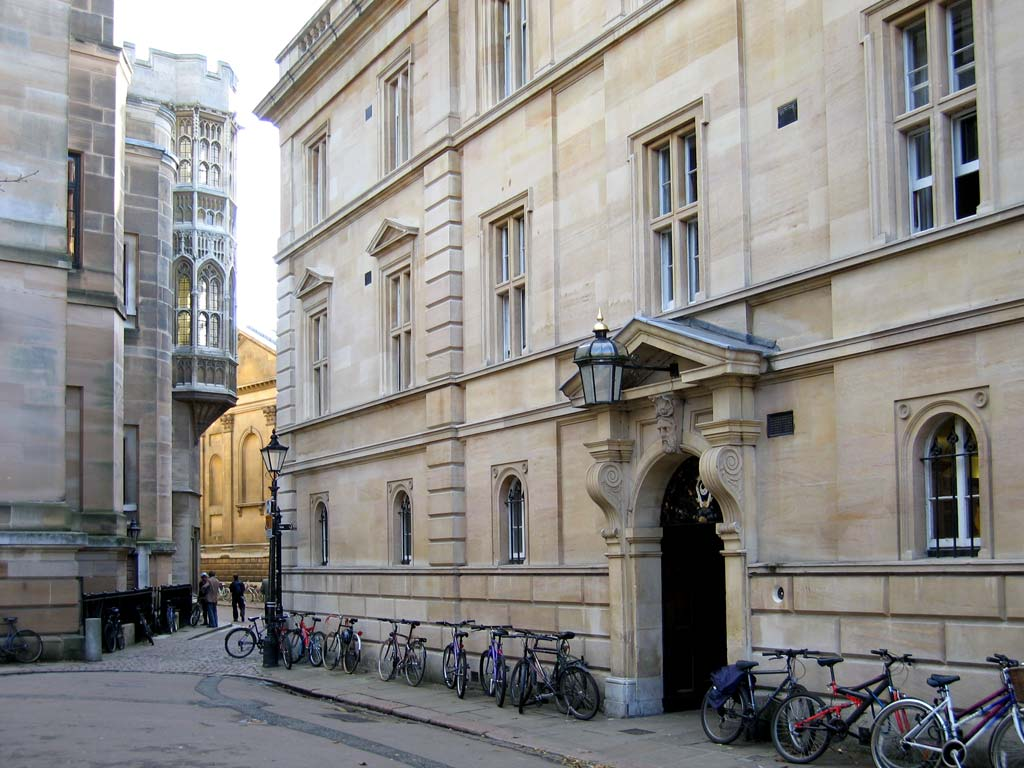
Entrance from Trinity Lane

The total number of students between WWI and WWII was deliberately kept around 220. These were selected men, and the academic standard rose rapidly. A further increase became necessary in the years following 1945, settling down at about 270, in addition to a larger number of post-graduate students than before. Trinity Hall became one of the moderate-sized colleges, differing little from any other in constitution, under the statutes made in 1925, or in the organization of work or play, but keeping, like every other college, a strong belief in its individual tradition. The College received some important benefactions, which enabled it almost to double its accommodation. By the 1980s, the College's academic performance greatly improved. It came top of the league table of Tripos firsts and II.1's in all subjects for the first time in the college's history for four out of six years between 1981-86.

==== Admission of Women and First Female Master ====
Following the change of the University's statutes in 1965, the College amended its statutes in 1967 to allow for the admission of women. The first female fellows were elected in 1975, the first female graduates in 1976, and the first female undergraduates in 1977, making Trinity Hall the sixth all-male college to admit women. The first female Master, Mary Hockaday, was elected in 2022.

==== 2015–2020 allegations of sexual misconduct ====
In 2015, after student complaints of verbal sexual harassment by college fellow Peter Hutchinson, he was asked to withdraw permanently from teaching and from social events at which students might be present. In 2017, he was apparently accidentally invited to a further event with students present, resulting in an independent review which allowed him to remain an Emeritus Fellow with a new agreement as to what events he could attend. After further protest from students and alumni, Hutchinson resigned.

In 2020, Tortoise Media alleged that Acting Senior Tutor William O'Reilly had seriously mishandled a disciplinary process of a student who was the subject of multiple allegations of sexual assault, including giving witness testimony on behalf of the student, with whom he had a "close relationship". The website also reported that O'Reilly had been the subject of a sexual assault allegation himself, and that college master Jeremy Morris had nevertheless allowed him to teach and to oversee the student disciplinary process. Morris and O'Reilly agreed to step back from their roles pending investigation, and the college governing body authorised an independent enquiry by Gemma White QC. The inquiry recommended Trinity Hall consider disciplinary action against Morris, who subsequently resigned in 2021. In 2022 the college published White's report alongside a response document indicating actions it had taken to improve college structures and culture.

==== 2026 private school recruitment controversy ====
In 2026, The Guardian reported that the college intended to target 50 private schools, predominantly in the south-east of England and charging upwards of £25,000 per year, for student recruitment, in order to improve the "quality" of applicants and prevent "unintentional discrimination" against privately educated applicants. The Sutton Trust, an educational charity aimed at improving social mobility, described the policy as "shocking", while Lee Elliot Major, a professor of social mobility at the University of Exeter, said that it implied "widening participation students are academically inferior", College master Mary Hockaday apologised for the language in the memo but said that the College "has not changed its admissions policy nor its commitment to widening participation".

== Buildings ==
=== Front Court ===
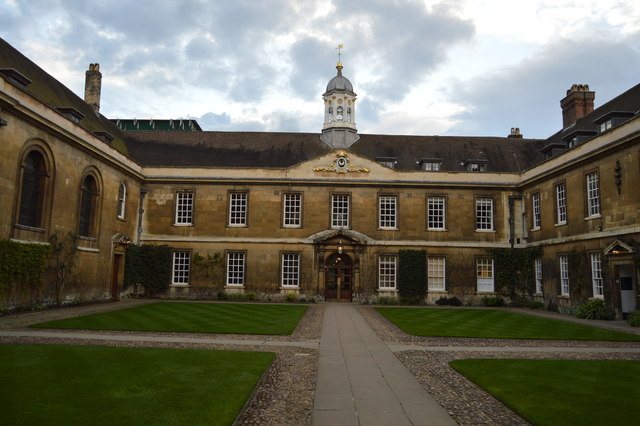
Front Court

Official permission to start acquiring land and houses was granted by King Edward III in February 1350. It is probable they were already in possession of a house, because the first piece of property wasn't purchased until November 1350 when Bishop Bateman paid £300 to the Prior and Convent of Ely for land and a house that formerly housed the Monks of Ely studying in Cambridge. Four years later a house and land was purchased from John Drax that made up the northeast corner of Front Court. The college continued to acquire small parcels of land, and the present size of Central Site was reached by 1544, save for one small piece of land to the north-western extremity acquired in 1769.

Building was in progress during February 1352, when royal protection was given to 'Richard de Bury and other carpenters' to carry timber to the site; and both the east side of the court and the hall on the west were finished before 1374, when a contract was signed for internal carpenter's work on the remainder of the western and, probably, on the northern side Once it was finished, the quadrangle was larger than any of its predecessors. The medieval structures remain unaltered, but were modernised and refaced in Portland and Ketton stone in the 18th century.

=== Chapel ===
The Chapel was licensed in 1352 and was built by August 1366, when Blessed Pope Urban V granted the college permission to celebrate Holy Mass there. Its present decor stems from its 1729–30 renovation; Lloyd had pre-existing graves removed to the Ante-Chapel, and the walls decorated with wainscotting and the ceiling with past Masters' crests. The Chapel was extended east in 1864, during which the original piscina was discovered and hidden behind a secret door. The painting behind the communion table is Maso da San Friano's Salutation, loaned from the Fitzwilliam Museum in 1957, replacing an earlier painting by Giacomo Stella.

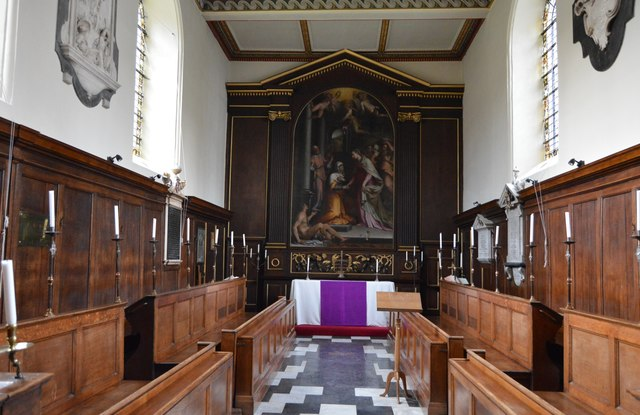
The chapel in 2016.

=== Dining Hall ===
The Dining Hall was rebuilt under Lloyd along similar lines to the Chapel, with rendered walls replaced by wainscotting and medieval beams by baroque carvings. A large portrait of Lloyd dominates the wall behind high table; Lloyd supposedly made it irremovable from its wainscot surroundings, so that his representation can never be erased from the college.

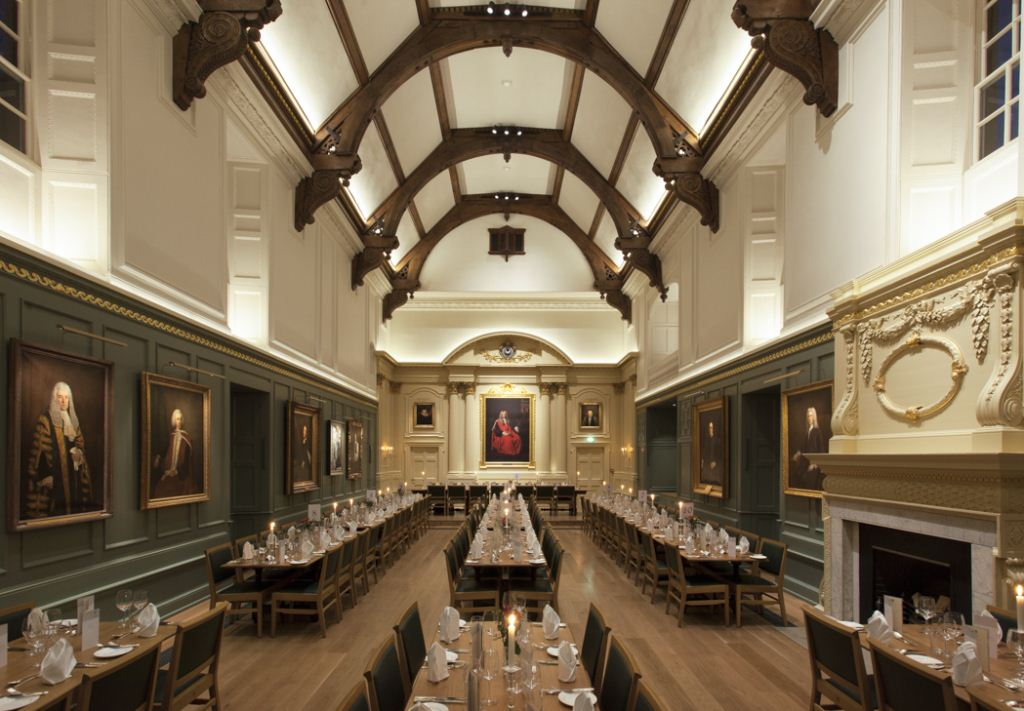
The dining hall in 2019.

=== Libraries ===
The college library was built in the late 16th century, with the permission of Elizabeth I and probably during the mastership of Thomas Preston, and is now principally used for the storage of the college's manuscripts and rare books; it is one of the few remaining chained libraries left in the country. The new Jerwood Library overlooking the river was opened by Lord Howe of Aberavon in 1999, and stores the college's modern book collection.

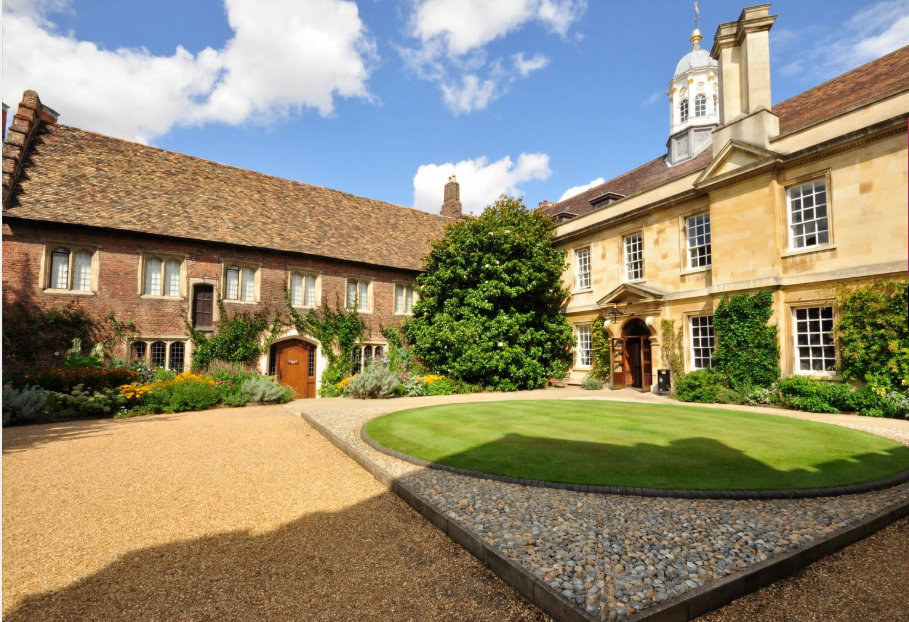
The Elizabethan Library, to the left.

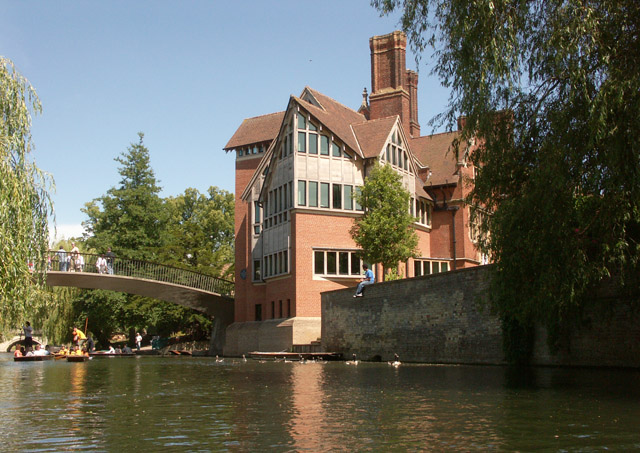
The Jerwood Library in Latham Court backs on to the River Cam next to Garret Hostel Bridge.

=== Wychfield Site ===
Trinity Hall has owned land off Huntingdon Road since 1674. In 1892 the College began renting 10 acres of land off Madingley Road from St John's College in order to create a playing field for the Cricket Club. The College purchased the land in 1923, and construction of the new playing fields and a sports pavilion began soon afterwards. Wychfield House was built by Francis Darwin, Charles Darwin's third son, and was subsequently purchased by the College in 1948. In 1963 Dean House was built, followed quickly by Boulton House in 1968, and Herrick House in 1972. Launcelot Fleming and Walter Christie Houses were built in 1992, and New Build in 2006.

=== WongAvery Music Gallery ===
In 2022 the WongAvery Music gallery was officially opened by Prince Richard, Duke of Gloucester. Generous donations from the Avery-Tsui Foundation made the building possible. The building was designed by Niall McLaughlin Architects and provides space for choir rehearsals, classical music recitals, lessons and private practice. The WongAvery Music Gallery won the RIBA East and RIBA National Awards in 2024.

== Student life ==
=== Combination Rooms ===
Trinity Hall has active Junior, Middle and Senior Combination Rooms for undergraduate, postgraduate and senior members of the college community respectively. The Middle Combination Room is located in Front Court, while the Junior Combination Room is adjacent to the college bar in North Court. Both the MCR and JCR have highly active committees and organize popular socials for their members across the term.

=== Societies ===
==== Trinity Hall Boat Club ====
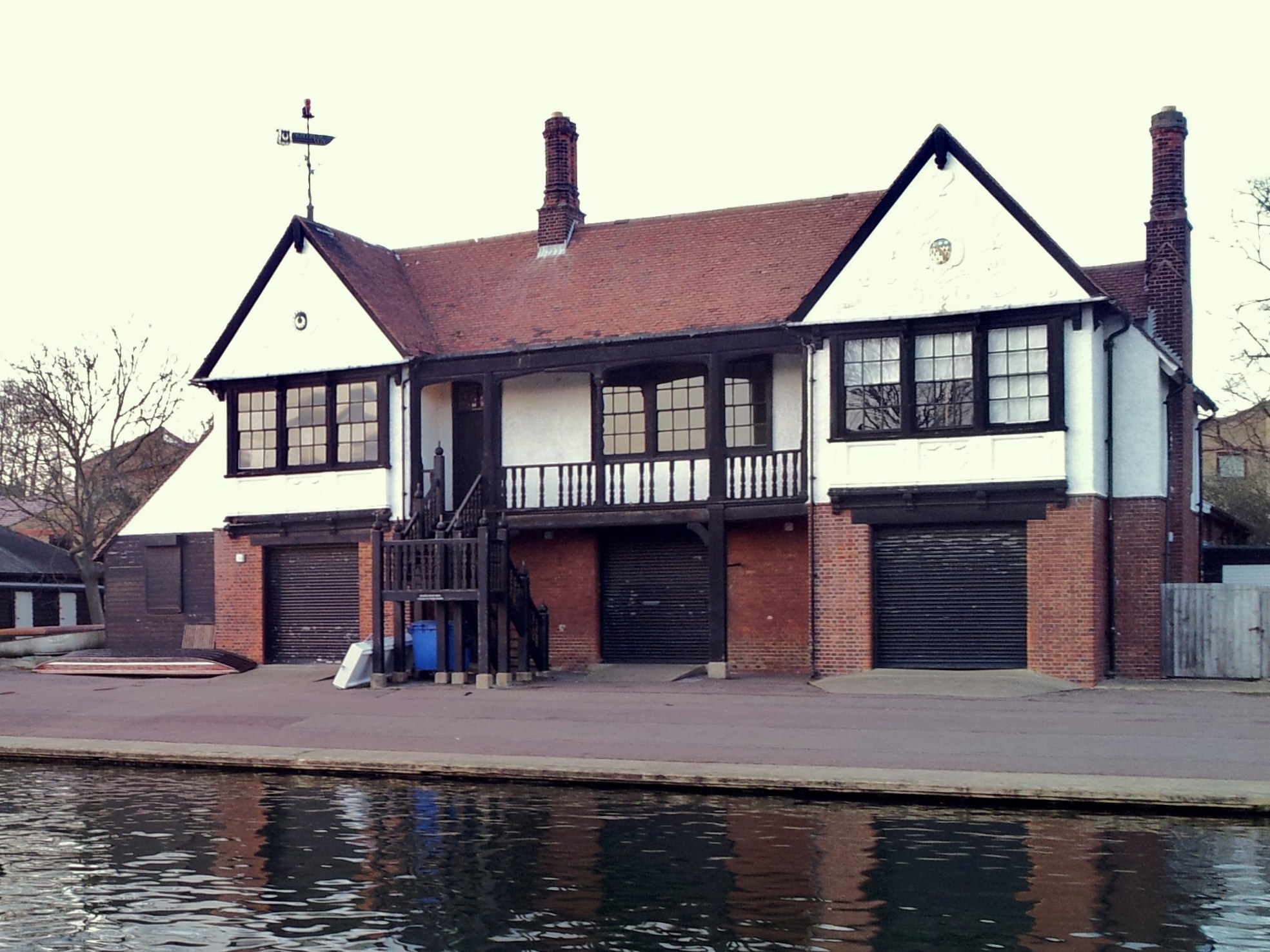
Trinity Hall Boat Club boathouse on the River Cam

Trinity Hall's boat club was founded in 1827, and has had a long and distinguished history; notably from 1890 until 1898, when the college stayed Head of the Mays for 33 consecutive days of rowing, which remains to this day the longest continuous defence by a single club of the bumps headship. The college won all but one of the events in the 1887 Henley Royal Regatta, making it the most successful Cambridge college in Henley's history. The current boathouse, built in 1905 in memory of Henry Latham, is on the River Cam, a short walk from the college.

==== Trinity Hall Christian Union ====
Trinity Hall's Christian Union was founded in 1877, making it the second oldest JCR-listed society. It is part of the broader Cambridge Inter-Collegiate Christian Union.

== Gallery ==
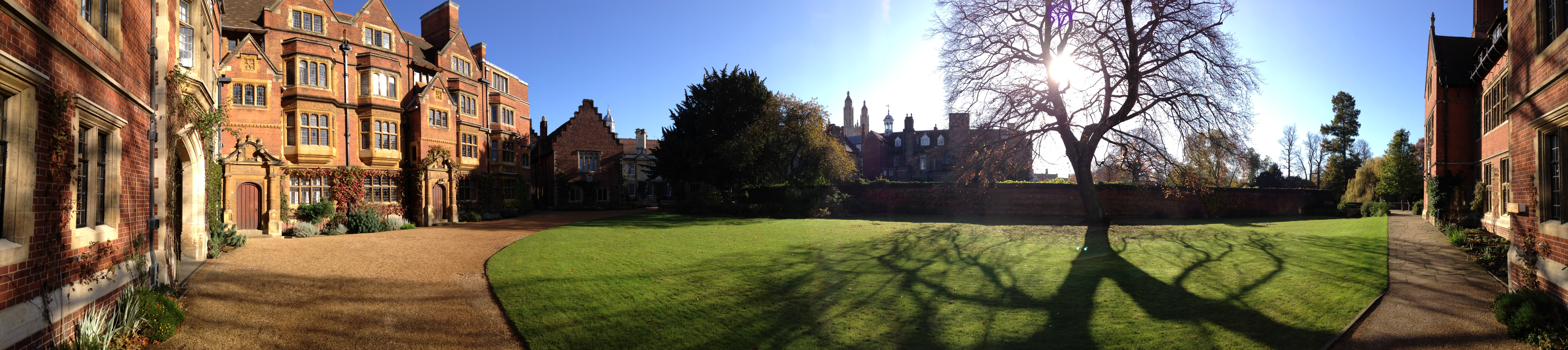
A panoramic view of Latham Lawn and the adjacent buildings

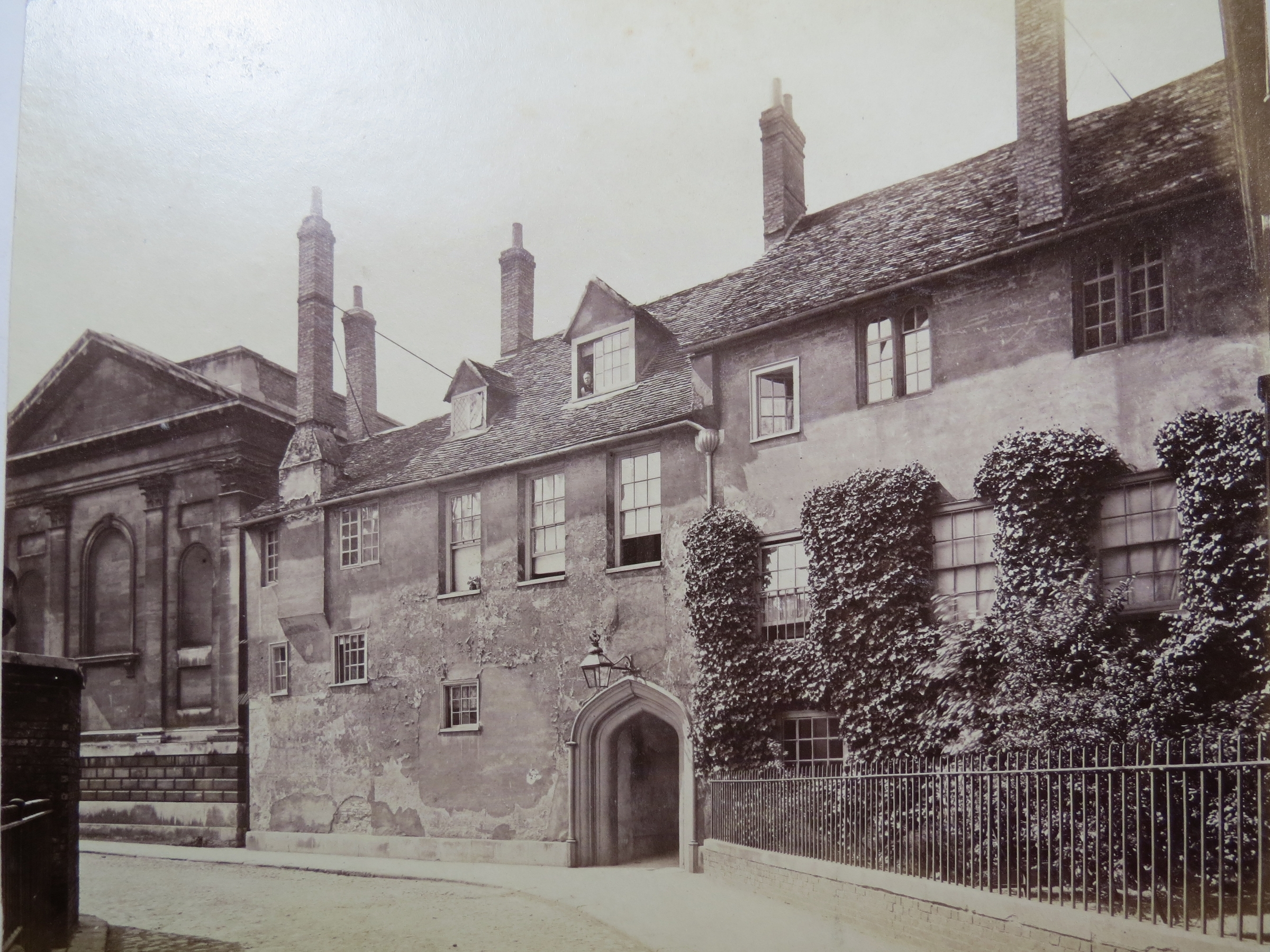
The original entrance

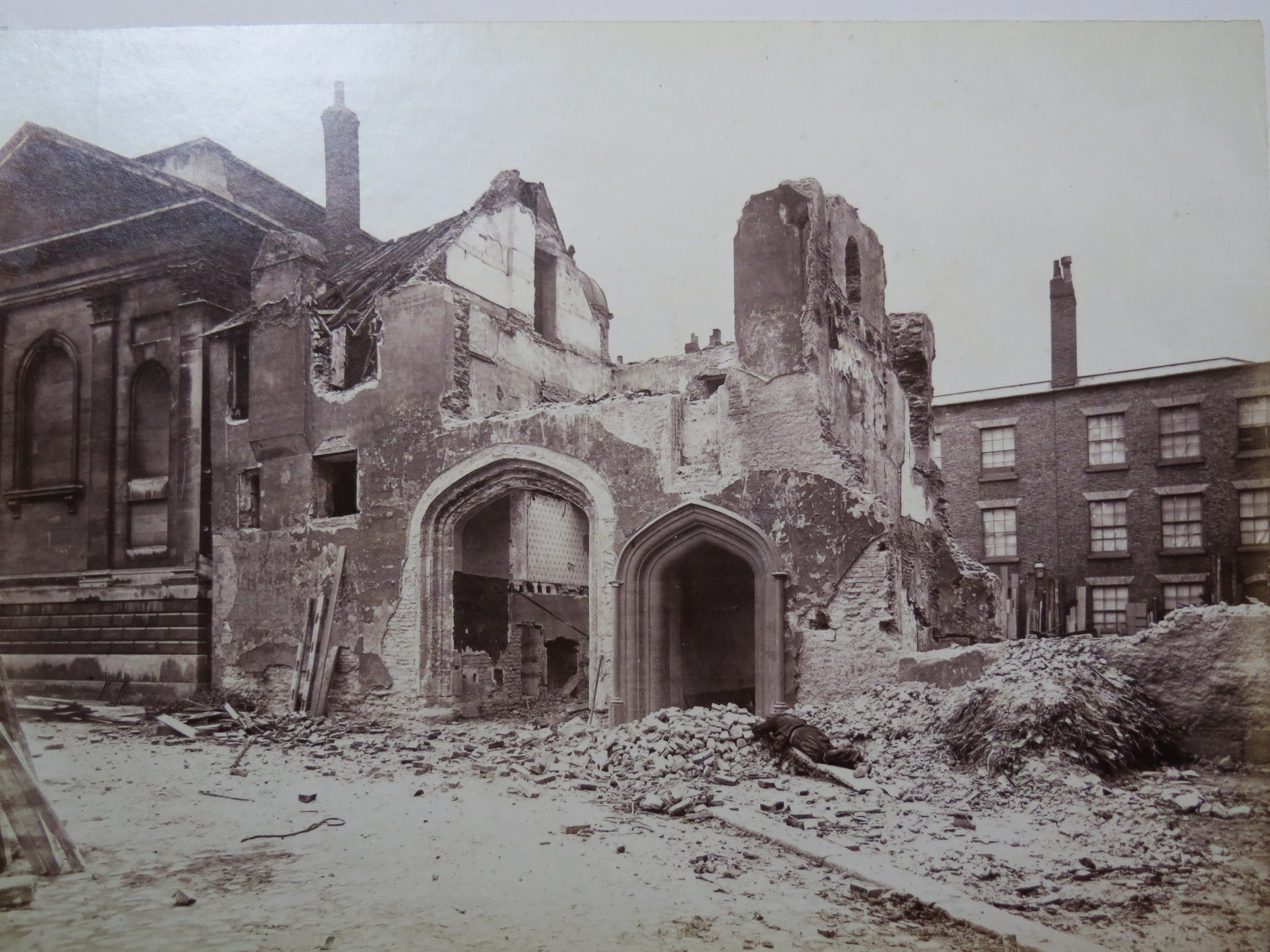
The demolition of the original entrance

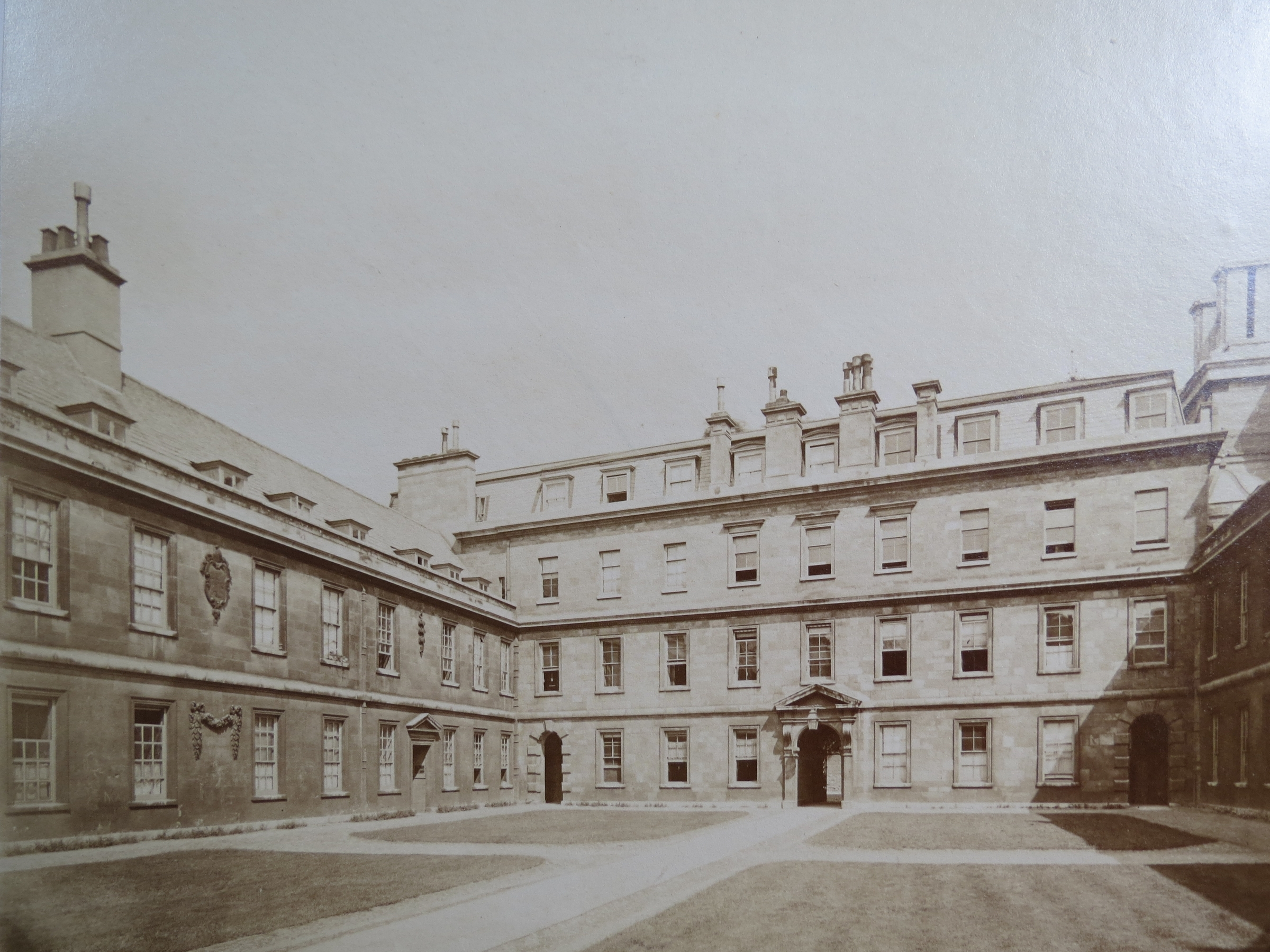
Front Court

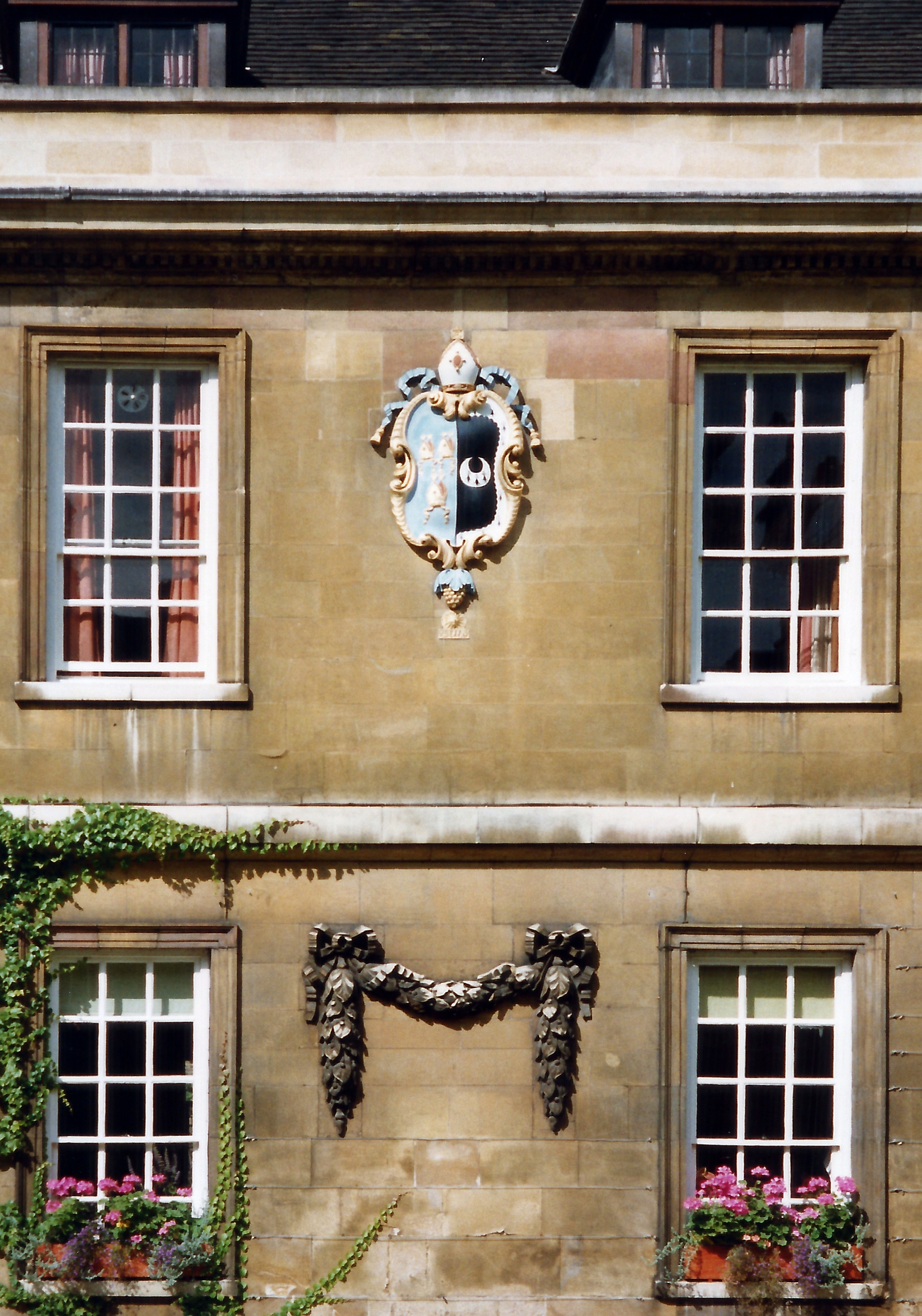
Armorial Detail in Front Court

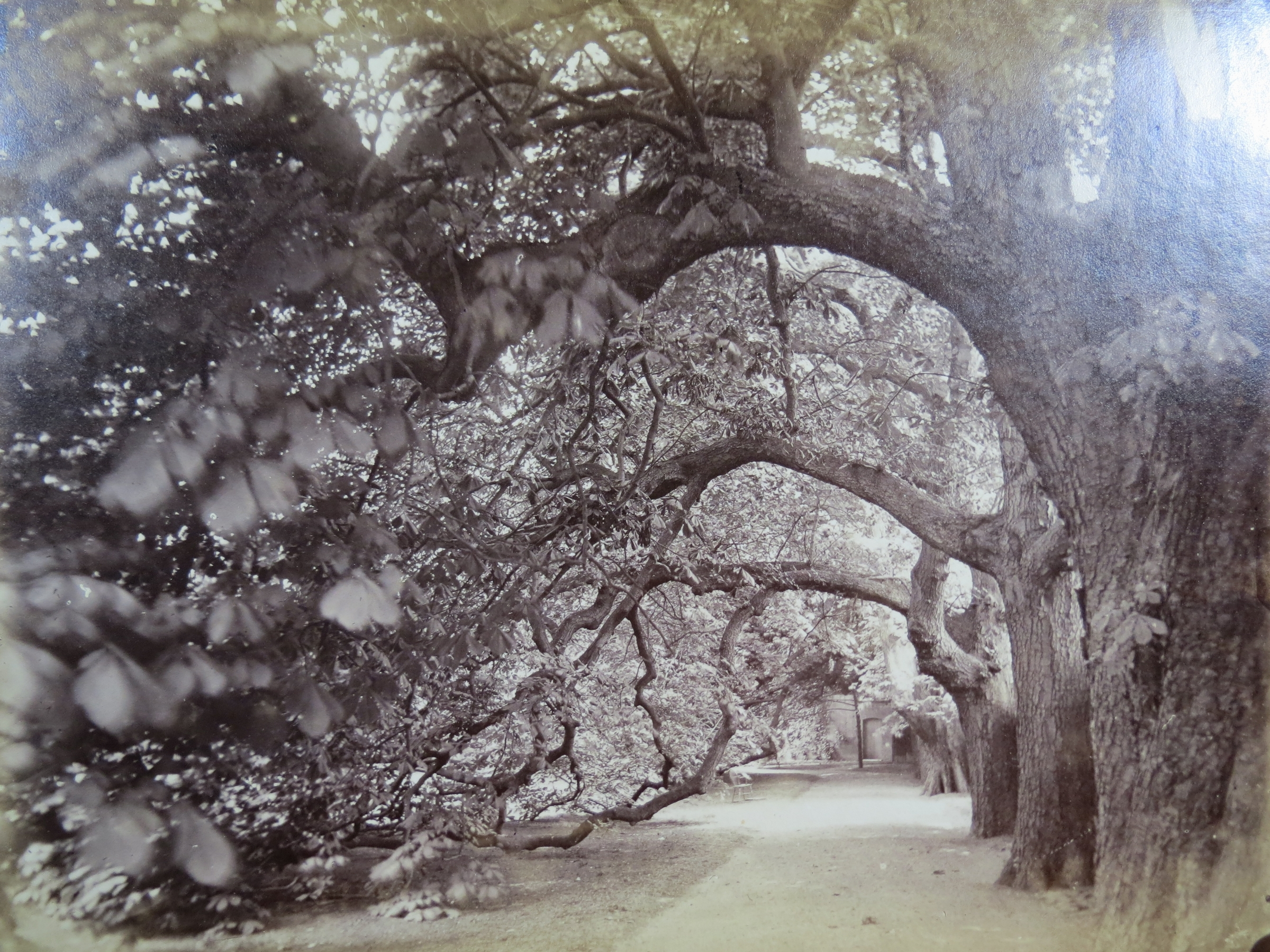
The Master's Garden

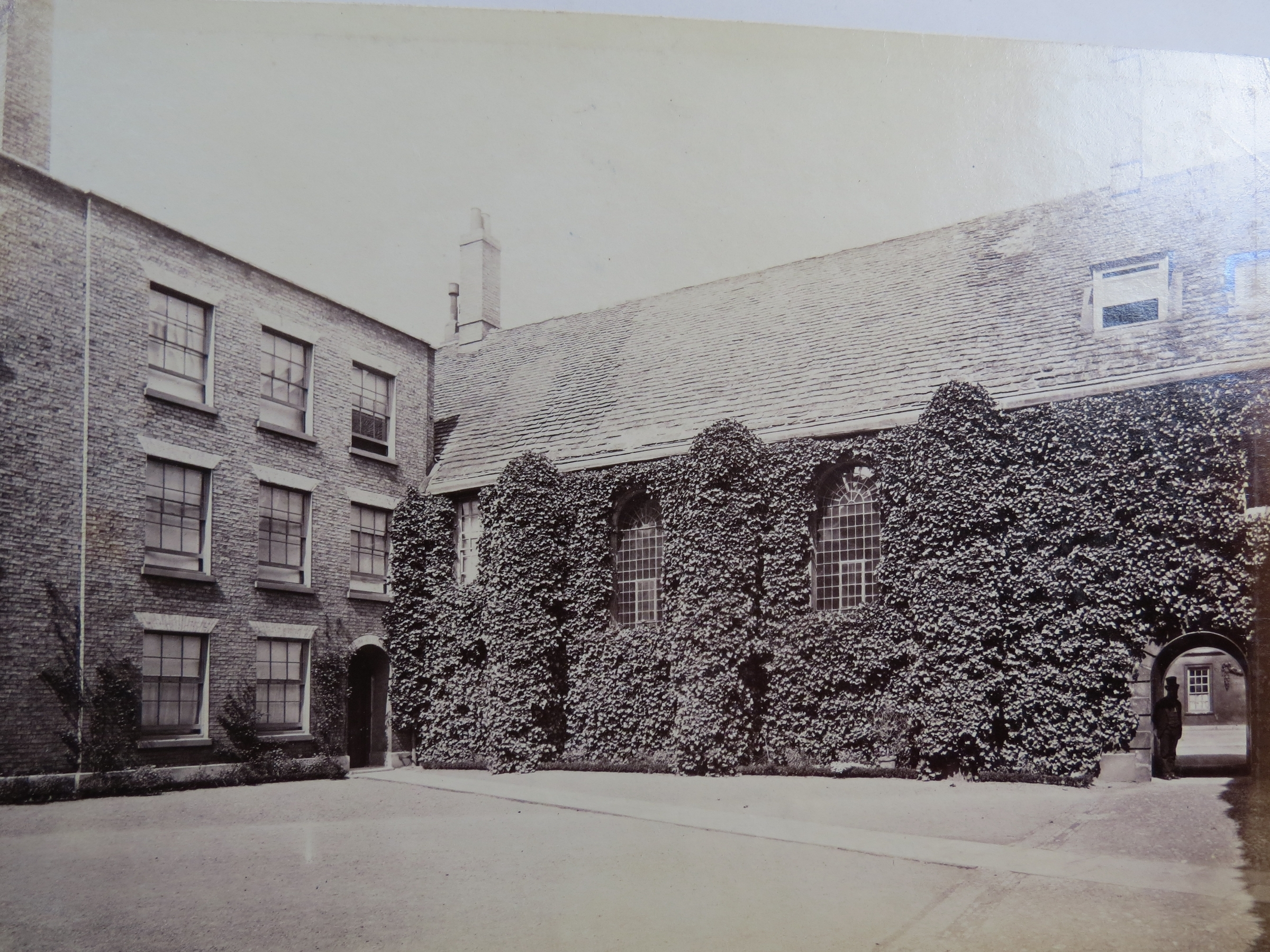
South Court

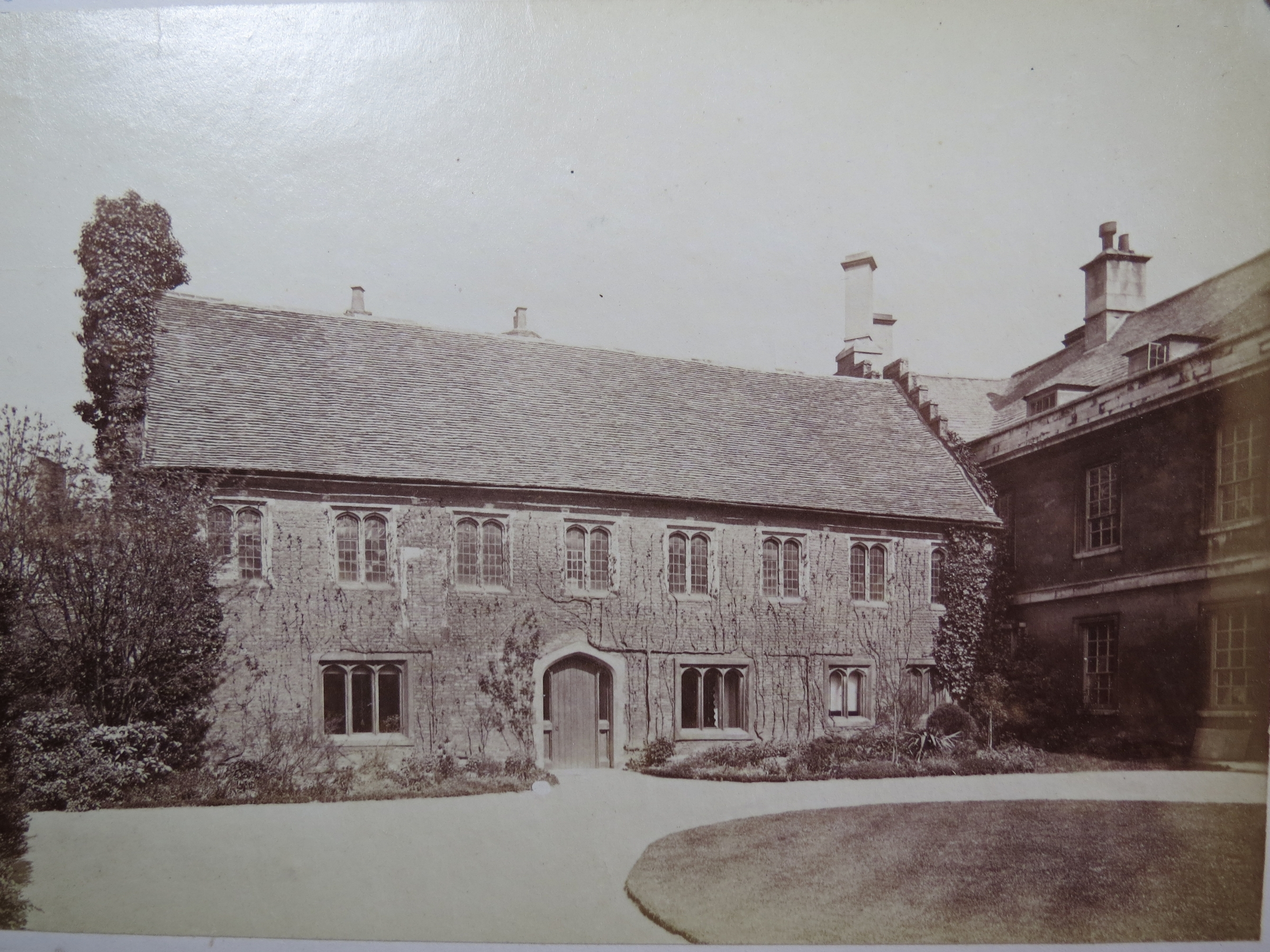
The Elizabethan Library

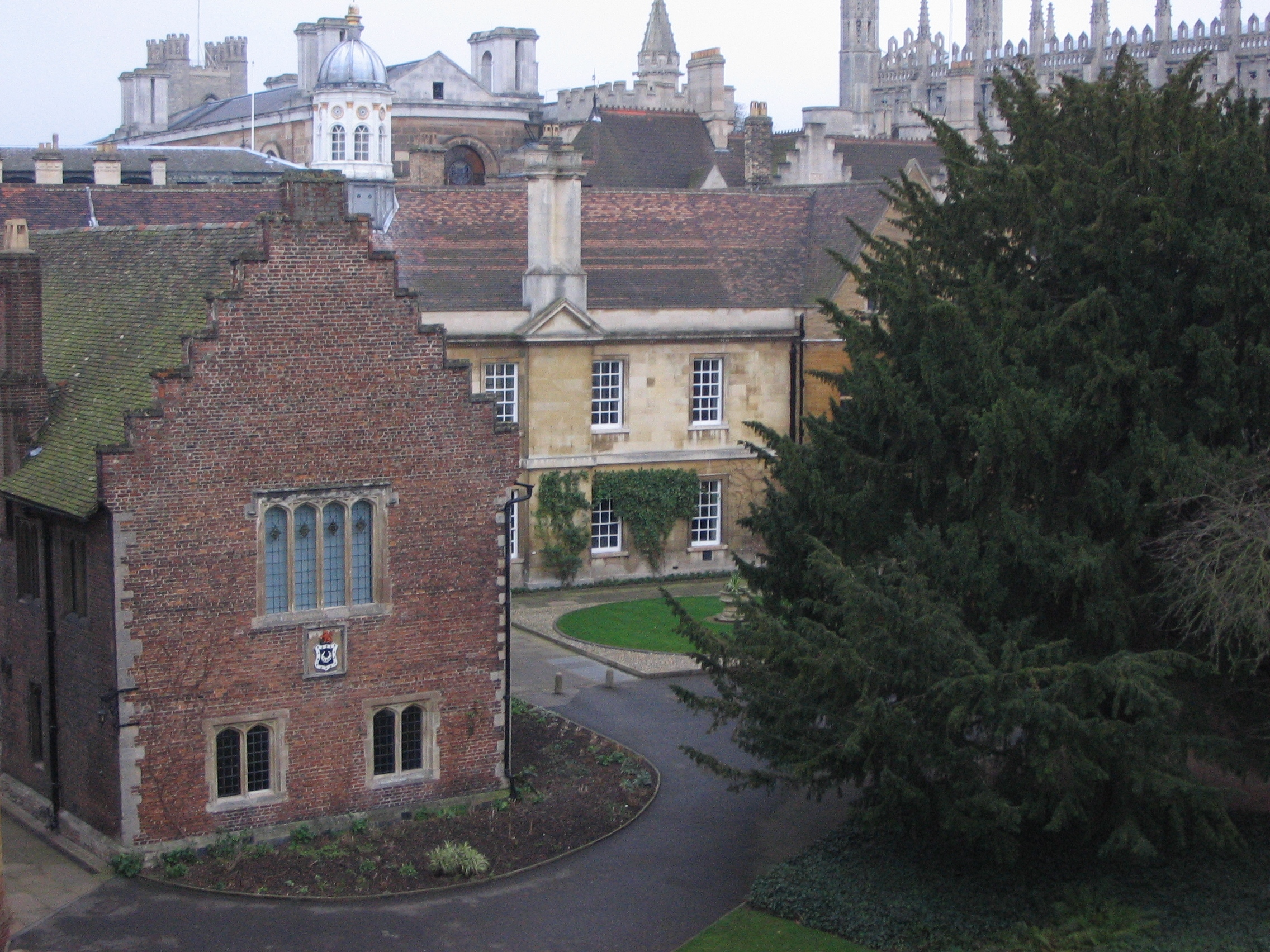
The Elizabethan Library

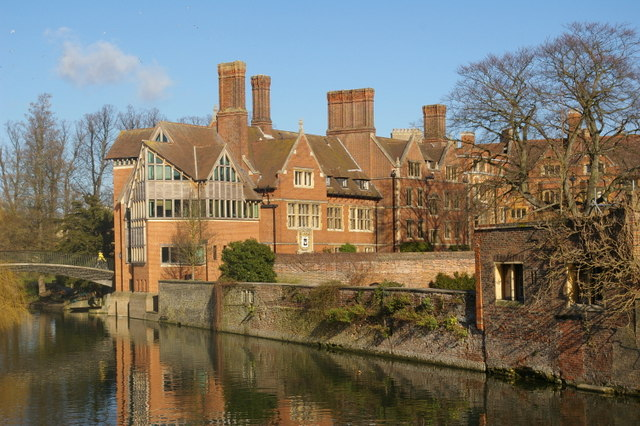
The Jerwood Library

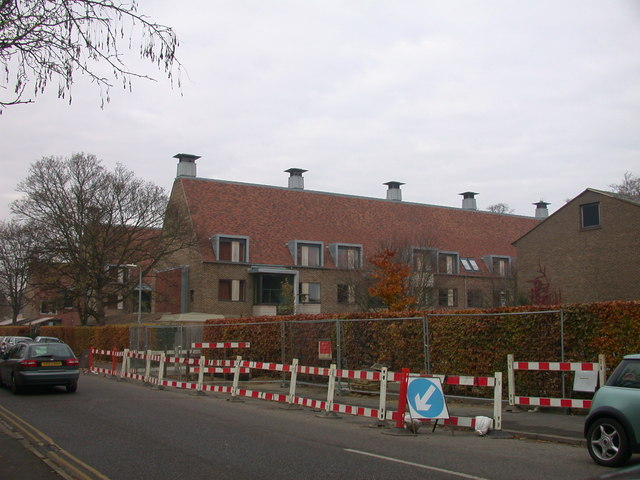
Wychfield Site

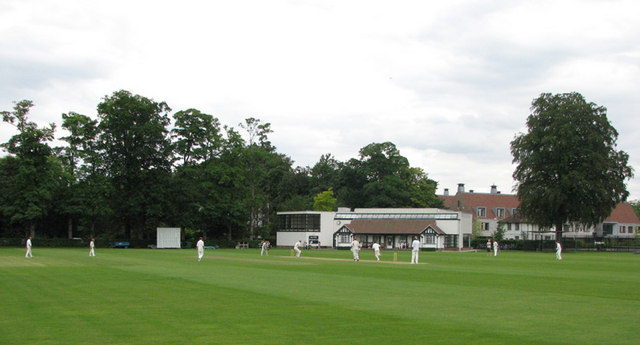
College cricket ground

== People associated with Trinity Hall ==
=== Masters ===
On 31 May 2022, Mary Hockaday was announced as the next Master.

=== Deans ===
The current dean is the Revd Dr Stephen Plant. The role of dean incorporates that of chaplain in other colleges.

=== Notable alumni ===
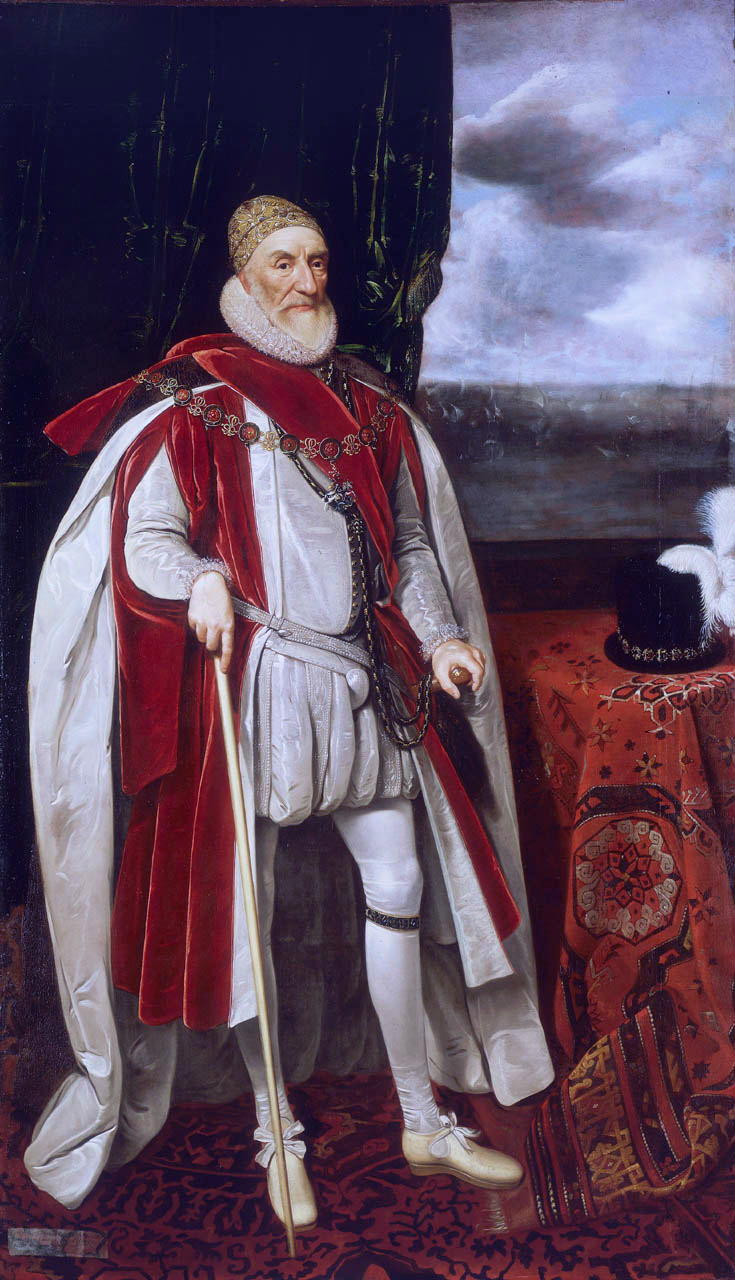
Charles Howard, 1st Earl of Nottingham, Lord High Admiral

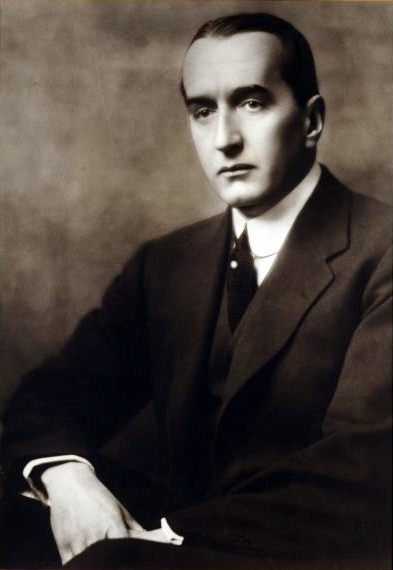
Stanley Bruce, 1st Viscount of Melbourne, Prime Minister of Australia

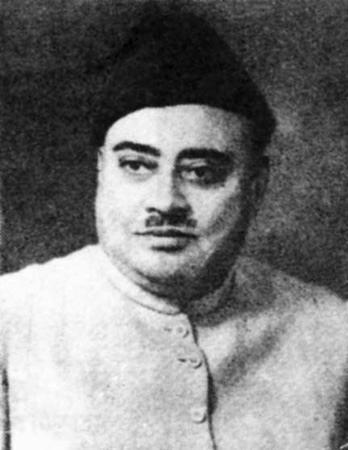
Sir Khawaja Nazimuddin, Prime Minister of Pakistan

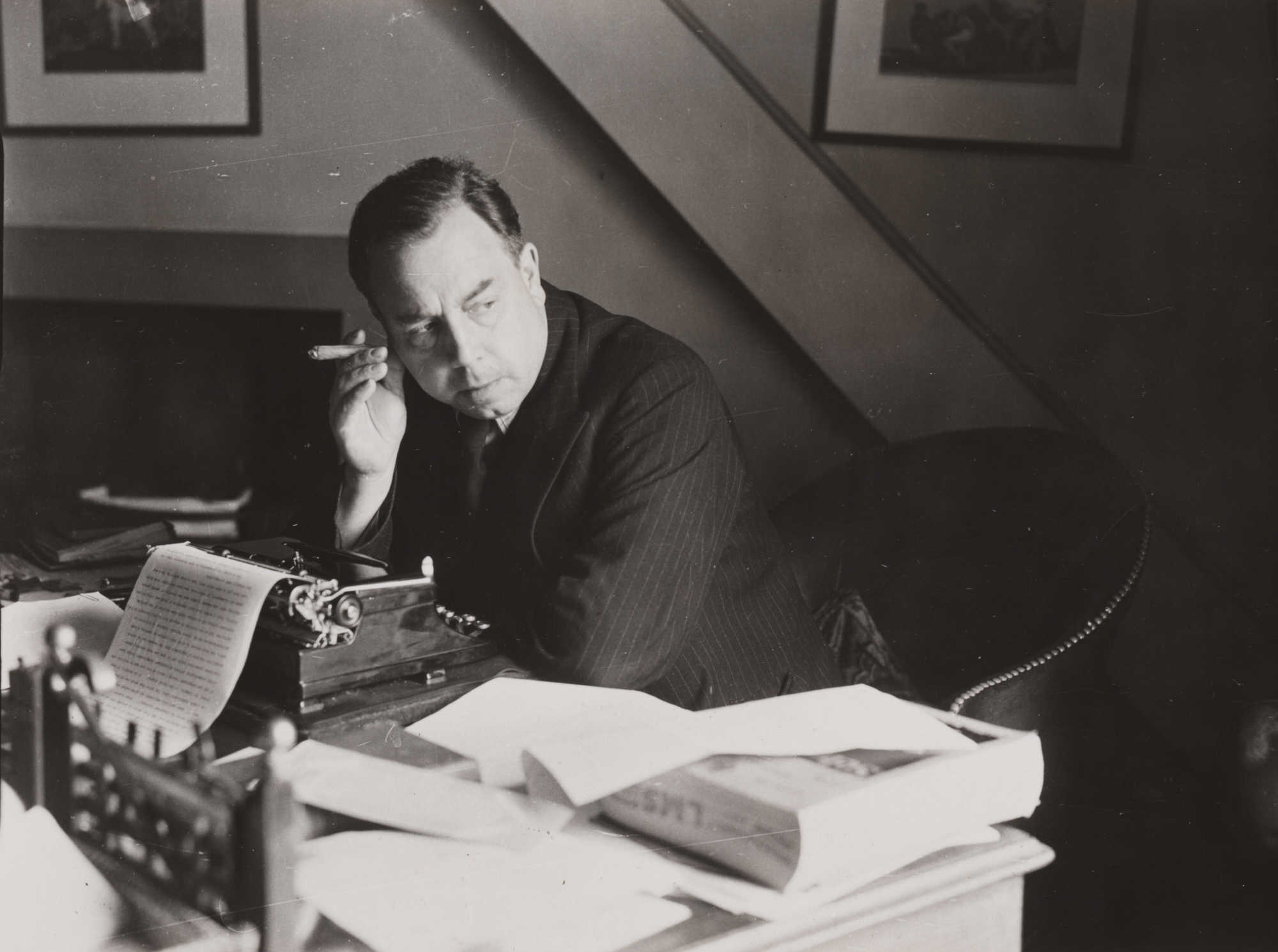
J. B. Priestley, novelist, playwright and broadcaster

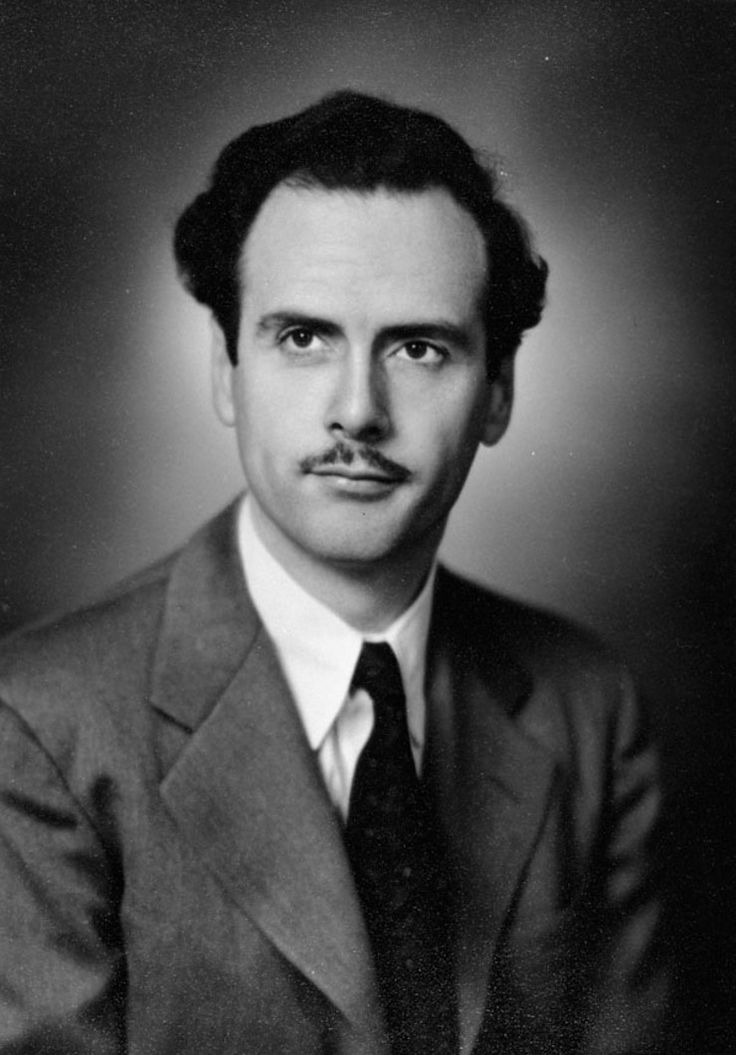
Marshall McLuhan, Canadian philosopher

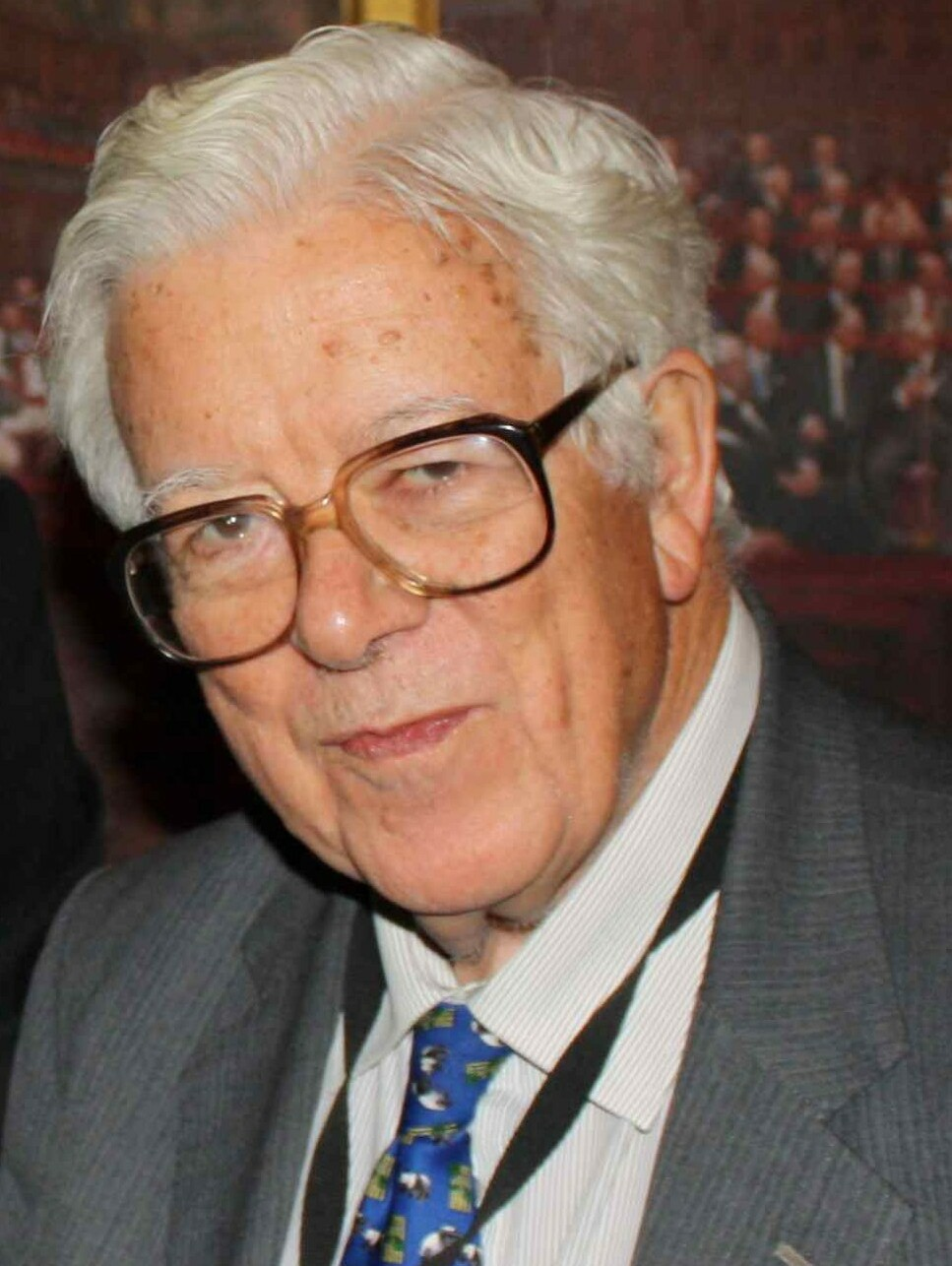
Geoffrey Howe, Baron Howe of Aberavon, Deputy prime minister

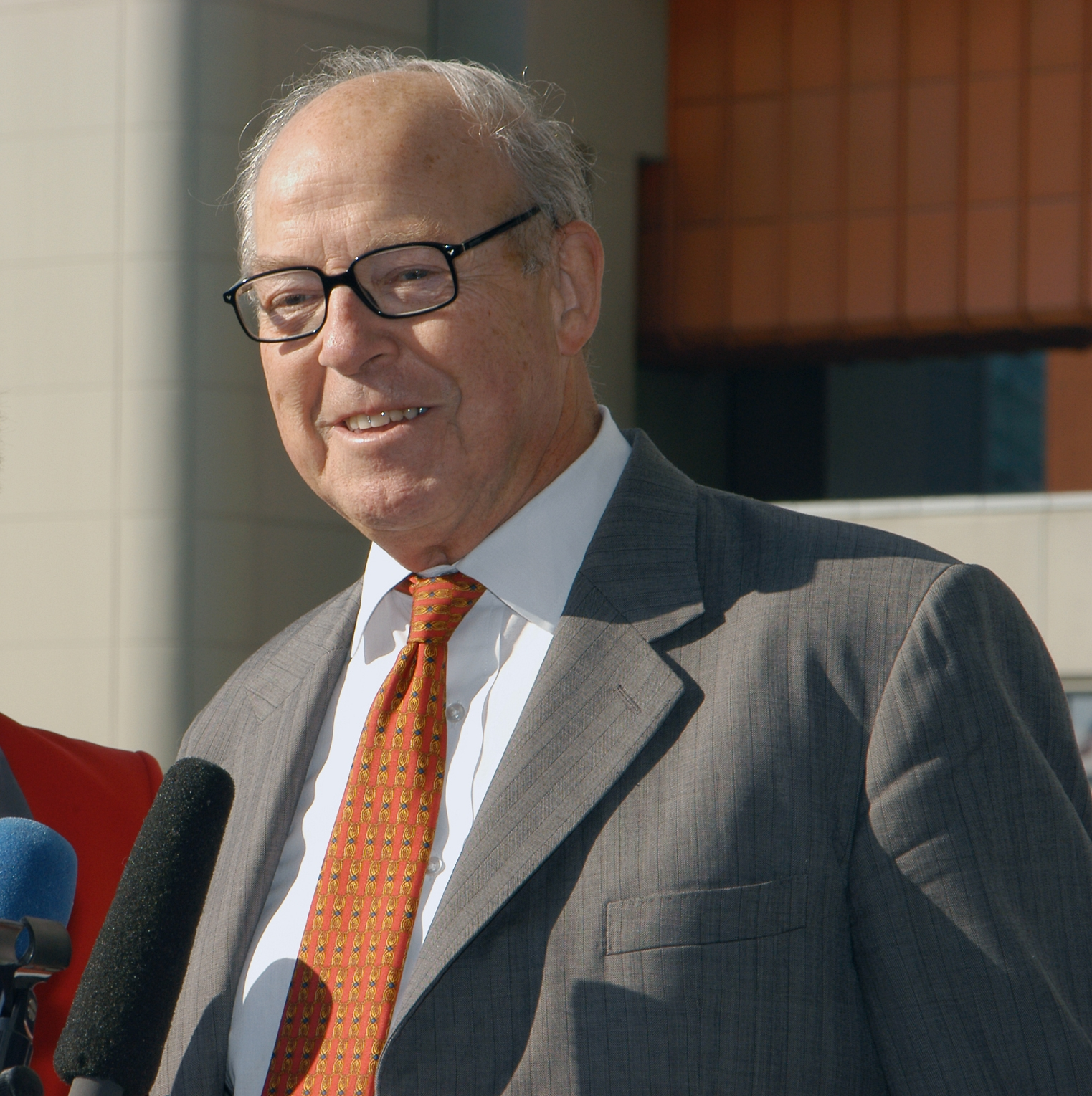
Hans Blix, Swedish minister for foreign affairs

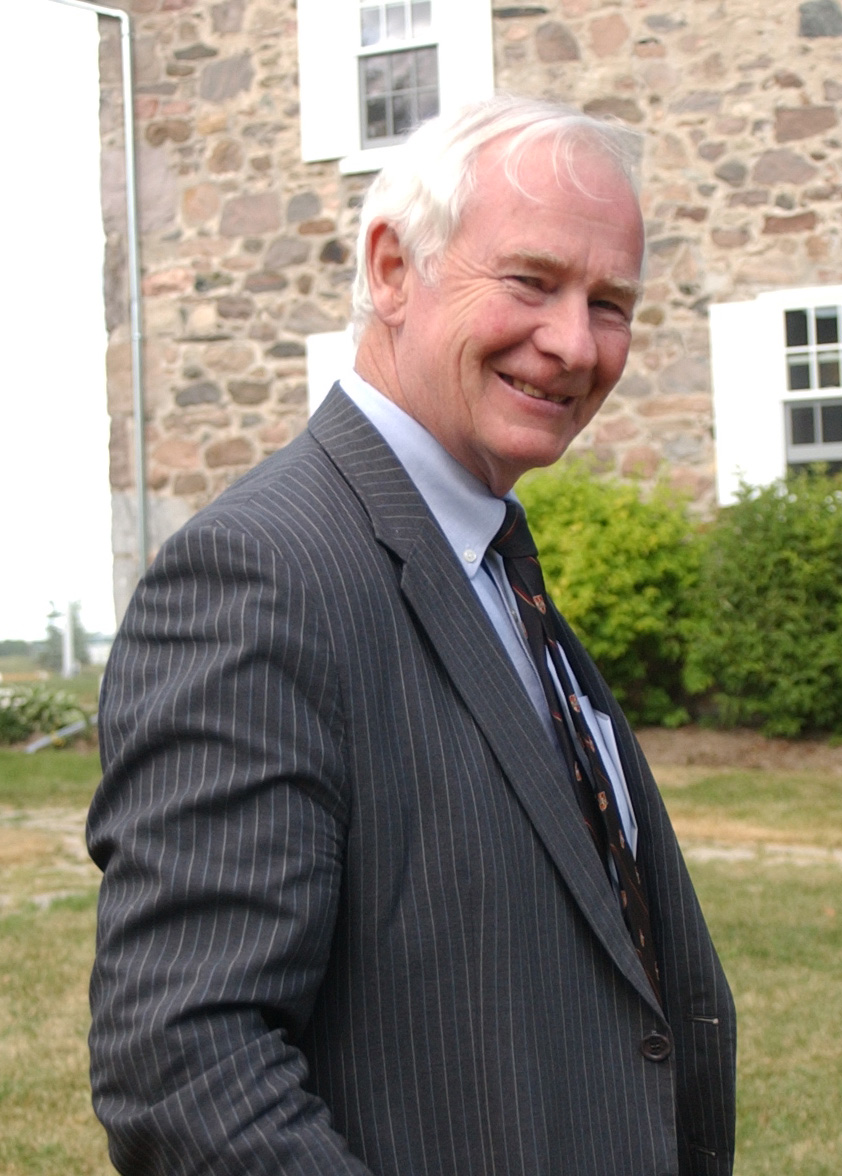
David Johnston, Governor General of Canada

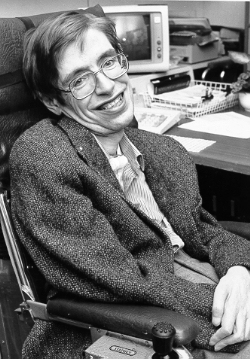
Stephen Hawking, Lucasian Professor of Mathematics

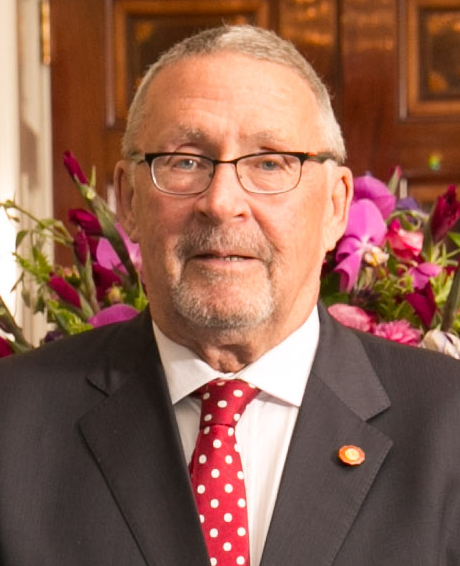
Guy Scott, President of Zambia

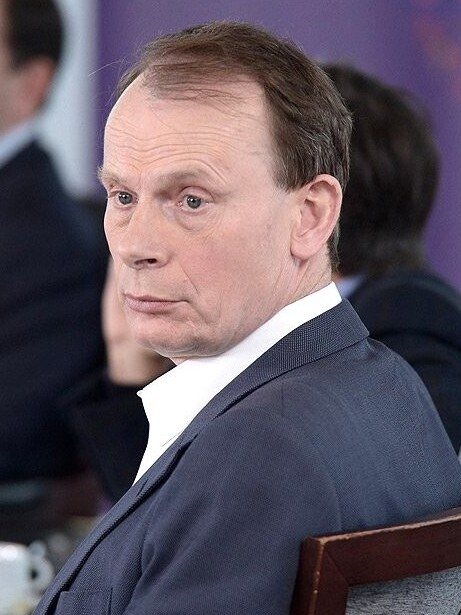
Andrew Marr, journalist and broadcaster

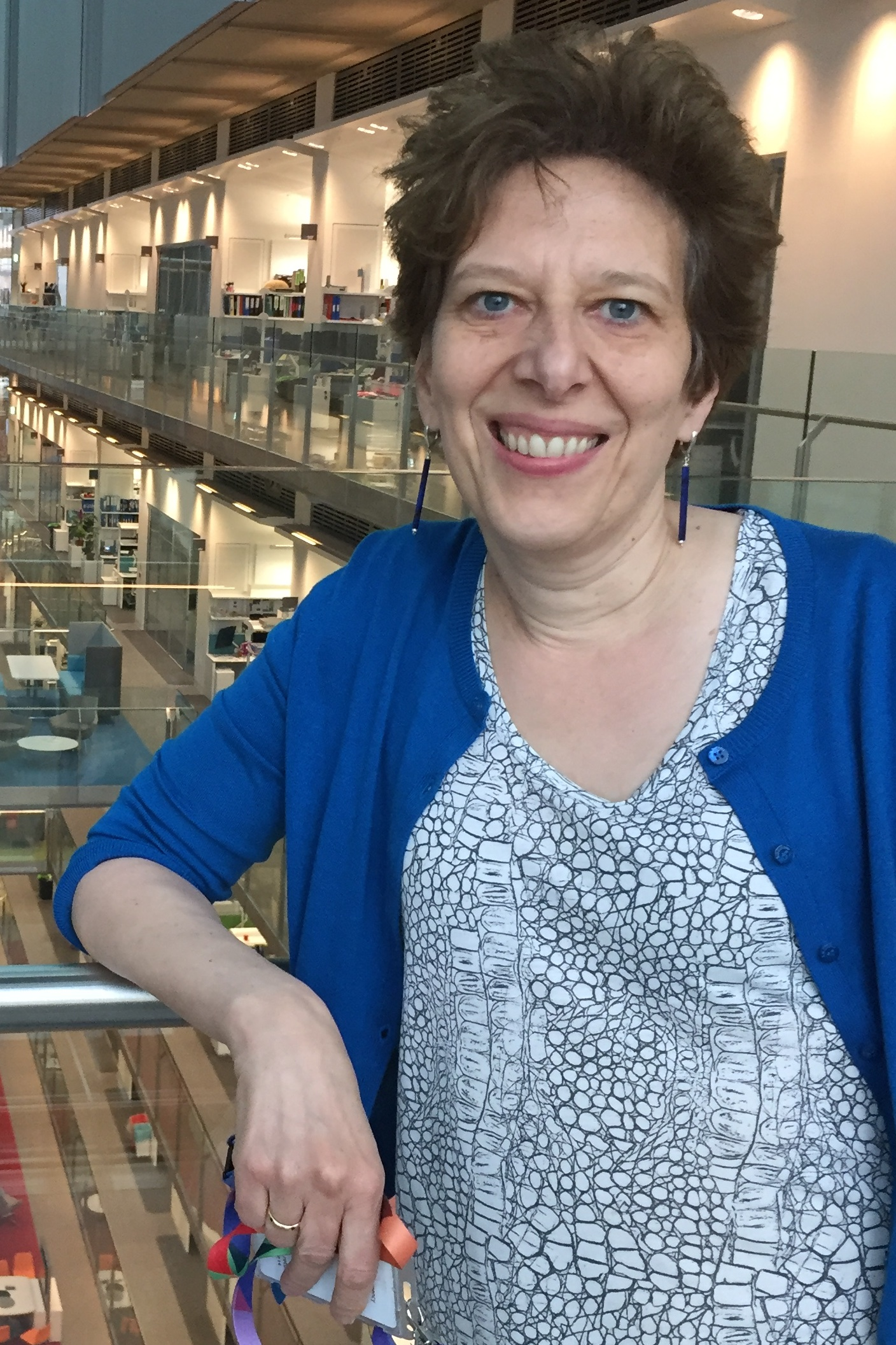
Caroline S. Hill, head of the Developmental Signalling Laboratory at the Francis Crick Institute

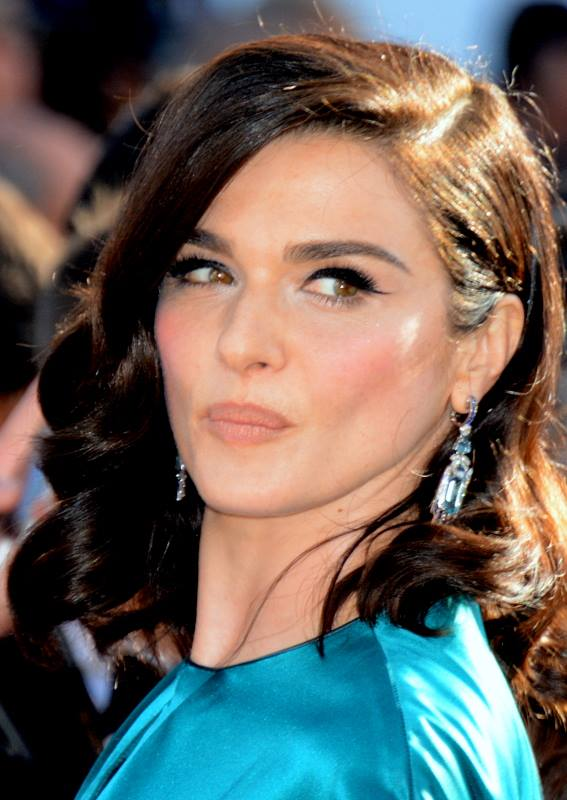
Rachel Weisz, Oscar-winning actress

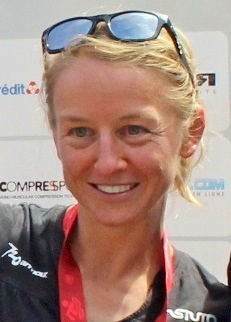
Emma Pooley, Olympic silver-medallist cyclist and presenter

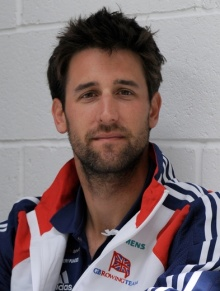
Tom James, double Olympic gold-medallist rower

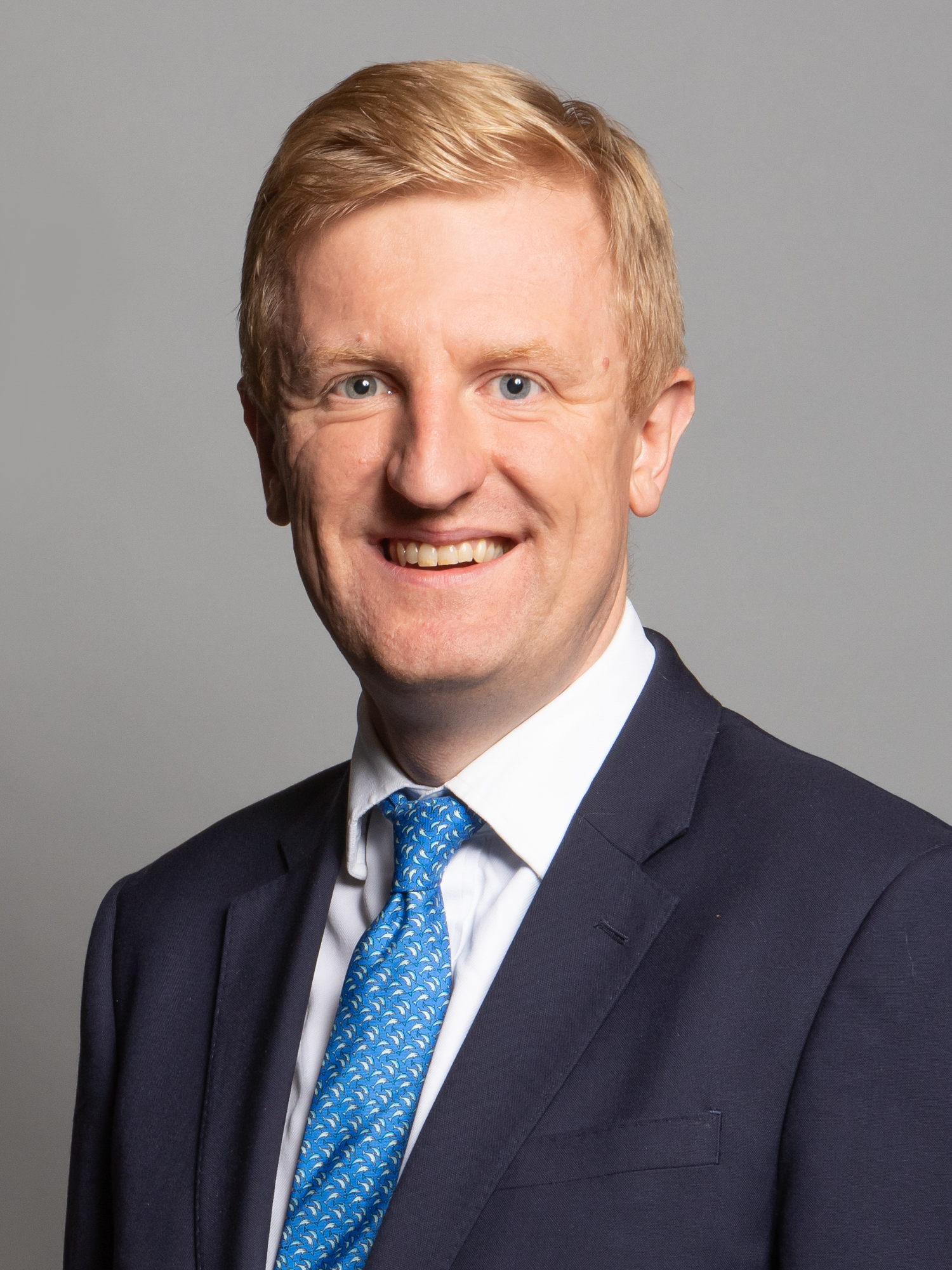
Oliver Dowden, former Deputy Prime Minister of the United Kingdom
- Robert McNeill Alexander – zoologist
- Charles M. Anderson – diplomat
- Zafar Ansari – Surrey and England cricketer
- Waheed Arian – physician and radiologist, founder of telemedicine charity Arian Teleheal
- Sir David Bean – Lord Justice of Appeal
- Thomas Bilney – Protestant reformer and martyr
- Hans Blix – Former UN Chief Weapons Inspector
- Stanley Bruce – Prime Minister of Australia, 1923–29
- Richard Boyle – rower, bronze medalist in 1908 Olympics
- Edward Carpenter – socialist poet and homosexual activist
- John Cockett – Hockey player. Bronze medal in 1952 Olympics
- William Cooke – Hymn writer
- Archibald Craig – Fencer. Competed in the 1924 and 1948 Olympics
- Felix Creutzig – Physicist and Climate Change Economists
- Don Cupitt – Philosopher of Religion and scholar of Christian theology
- Sir Charles Dilke – Victorian politician
- Laurence Doherty – Tennis player, Olympic gold medalist and Wimbledon Champion
- Reginald Doherty – Tennis player, Olympic gold medalist and Wimbledon Champion
- Lionel Elvin – Educationist
- Ronald Firbank – Novelist
- Billy Fiske – Bobsleigh Olympian and first American fatality of WWII
- Norman Fowler – Politician
- Aubrey de Grey – Anti-ageing theorist
- Frances Harrison – journalist
- Stephen Hawking – Physicist
- Arthur Henderson, Baron Rowley - Labour politician; Secretary of State for Air, 1947–51
- Robert Herrick – poet
- Matthew Holness – Perrier Comedy Award-winning creator of Garth Marenghi
- Andy Hopper – Computer scientist
- Charles Howard, 1st Earl of Nottingham – admiral
- Geoffrey Howe – Former MP and Chancellor of the Exchequer
- Nicholas Hytner – Theatre and film director
- Robin Legge – music critic
- Magnus Linklater – Journalist
- Tom James – Rower, double Olympian and Olympic Gold medallist
- Greville Janner – Former Labour MP and Peer
- David Johnston – The governor general of Canada
- Vladimir Kara-Murza – Russian author and political prisoner
- Harold Kitching – Rower. Bronze medal in 1908 Olympics
- Donald Maclean – Soviet spy
- Andrew Marr – Political journalist and broadcaster
- Adam Mars-Jones – British novelist and critic
- Brett Mason – Australian Senator
- Alfred Maudslay – Archaeologist, explorer, and diplomat
- Alan Nunn May – Physicist and Soviet spy
- Reginald McKenna – Chancellor of the Exchequer during World War I
- Marshall McLuhan – Media theorist
- Sir John Meyrick – Rower. Silver medal in 1948 Olympics
- Peter Millett, Baron Millett – Law Lord
- John Monckton, 1st Viscount Galway – politician
- Khawaja Nazimuddin – Pakistan's second Prime Minister
- Donald Nicholls, Baron Nicholls of Birkenhead – Law Lord
- David Oliver – Geriatrician, President of the British Geriatrics Society
- Tony Palmer – Film screenwriter and director
- Michael Peppiatt – Art historian
- Baron von Pfetten – Professor, Ambassador and Senator
- Emma Pooley – Olympic silver medalist
- Katrina Porteous – Poet
- Alistair Potts – British World Champion coxswain
- J.B. Priestley – Writer
- William Barnard Rhodes-Moorhouse – First airman to be awarded the Victoria Cross
- Abigail Rokison – Shakespeare academic
- David Sheppard – Bishop and cricketer
- John Silkin – Former Government minister
- Samuel Silkin – Baron Silkin of Dulwich, of North Leigh in the County of Oxfordshire – former MP and Attorney-General
- William Smith – Hockey player. Gold medal in 1920 Olympics
- Tony Slattery – Perrier Comedy Award-winning comedian
- Francis Spufford - British novelist
- Douglas Stuart – Rower. Bronze medal in 1908 Olympics
- Leslie Stephen – Victorian writer and critic
- Galen Strawson – Philosopher
- Olivia Sudjic - British novelist
- Sidney Earnest Swann – Rower, gold medalist in 1912 Olympics
- Sir Cyril Taylor - Businessman and social entrepreneur
- John Taylor – Hockey player. Bronze medal in 1952 Olympics
- John Thomas, Baron Thomas of Cwmgiedd – Lord Chief Justice of England and Wales
- David J. Thouless – theoretical physicist, Nobel Prize and Wolf Prize winner
- Nicholas Tomalin – Journalist and reporter
- Mark Tully – BBC radio broadcaster
- Edmund de Waal – Ceramic artist and author
- Terry Waite – Fellow Commoner of Trinity Hall
- Rachel Weisz – Academy Award-winning actress
- Sophie Winkleman – Actress
- John Wodehouse, 3rd Earl of Kimberley – Polo player, Olympics gold medalist

== See also ==
- June Event

== Bibliography ==
- A Trinity Hall Treasury, Susan Pope, ISBN 9781805223733
- The Hidden Hall: Portrait of a Cambridge College, Peter Pagnamenta, ISBN 1-903942-31-4
- Trinity Hall: The History of a Cambridge College, 1350-1975, Charles Crawley, ISBN 0-9505122-0-6
- Warren's Book (Ed. 1911 by A.W.W.Dale)
- Trinity Hall or, The college of scholars of the Holy Trinity of Norwich, in the University of Cambridge, Henry Elliot Malden. (1902). London: F.E. Robinson.
