= List of masters of Trinity Hall, Cambridge =

The following have served as Master of Trinity Hall, Cambridge:

- 1350–1355: Robert de Stretton (or Stratton), d.1385
- 1355–1384: Adam Wickmer (or Walker), d.1384
- 1384–1413: Robert Braunch (or Branch), d.1413
- 1413–1429: Henry Wells, d.1431
- 1429–1443: Marmaduke Lumley, d.1450
- 1443–1453: Simon Dalling
- 1453–1471: Simon Thornham
- 1471–1501: William Dalling
- 1502–1503: Edward Shouldham, d.1503
- 1503–1505: Vacant
- 1505–1512: John Wright, d.1519
- 1512–1517: Walter Huke (or Hewke), d.1517
- 1517–1525: Thomas Larke, d.1528
- 1525–1549: Stephen Gardiner, d.1555
- 1549–1552: Walter Haddon, d.1572
- 1552–1553:William Mouse (removed), d.1588
- 1553–1555: Stephen Gardiner (secundus), d.1555
- 1555–1559: William Mouse (secundus), d.1588
- 1559–1585: Henry Harvey, d.1585
- 1585–1598: Thomas Preston, d.1598
- 1598–1611: John Cowell, d.1611
- 1611–1626: Clement Corbet, d.1652
- 1626–1645: Thomas Eden, d.1645
- 1645: John Selden, d.1654
- 1645: Robert King, d.1676
- 1645–1660: John Bond, d.1676
- 1660–1676: Robert King (secundus), d.1676
- 1676–1688: Thomas Exton, d.1688
- 1688–1702: George Oxenden, d.1703
- 1703–1710: George Bramston, d.1710
- 1710–1735 Sir Nathaniel Lloyd, d.1745
- 1735–1764: Sir Edward Simpson, d.1764
- 1764–1803: Sir James Marriott, d.1803
- 1803–1815: Sir William Wynne, d.1815
- 1815–1843: Thomas Le Blanc, d.1843
- 1843–1852: Sir Herbert Jenner-Fust, d.1852
- 1852–1877: Thomas Charles Geldart, d.1877
- 1877–1888: Sir Henry James Sumner Maine, d.1888
- 1888–1902: Henry Latham, d.1902
- 1902–1916: Edward Anthony Beck, d.1916
- 1916–1919: Vacant
- 1919–1929: Henry Bond, d.1938
- 1929–1954: Henry Roy Dean, d.1961
- 1955–1965: Sir Ivor Jennings, d.1965
- 1966–1975 William Alexander Deer, d.2009
- 1975–1986: Sir Theodore Morris Sugden, d.1984
- 1986–2000: Sir John Lyons, d.2020
- 2000–2005: Peter Clarke, vivant
- 2005–2014: Martin Daunton, vivant
- 2014–2021: Jeremy Morris, vivant
- 2022–Present: Mary Hockaday
