= John Chadworth =

15th-century Bishop of Lincoln

- Bishop of Lincoln
- Arms of Chedworth: Azure, a chevron between three wolf's heads erased or
- Elected: c. 11 February 1451
- Term ended: 23 November 1471
- Predecessor: Marmaduke Lumley
- Successor: Thomas Rotherham

Orders
- Consecration: 18 June 1452

Personal details
- Died: 23 November 1471
- Denomination: Catholic

John Chadworth (or Chedworth; died 1471) was Provost of King's College, Cambridge from 1447 until his election as Bishop of Lincoln. He was elected bishop about 11 February 1451 and consecrated on 18 June 1452. He died on 23 November 1471.

Remains of Chedworth's tomb at Lincoln Cathedral. The monumental brass has been lost.

== Citations ==
Academic offices
| Preceded by William Millington | Provost of King's College, Cambridge; 1447–1451 | Succeeded by Robert Wodelark |
Catholic Church titles
| Preceded by Marmaduke Lumley | Bishop of Lincoln; 1451–1471 | Succeeded by Thomas Rotherham |
