= Latham-Scott Boathouse =

Boathouse in Cambridge, England

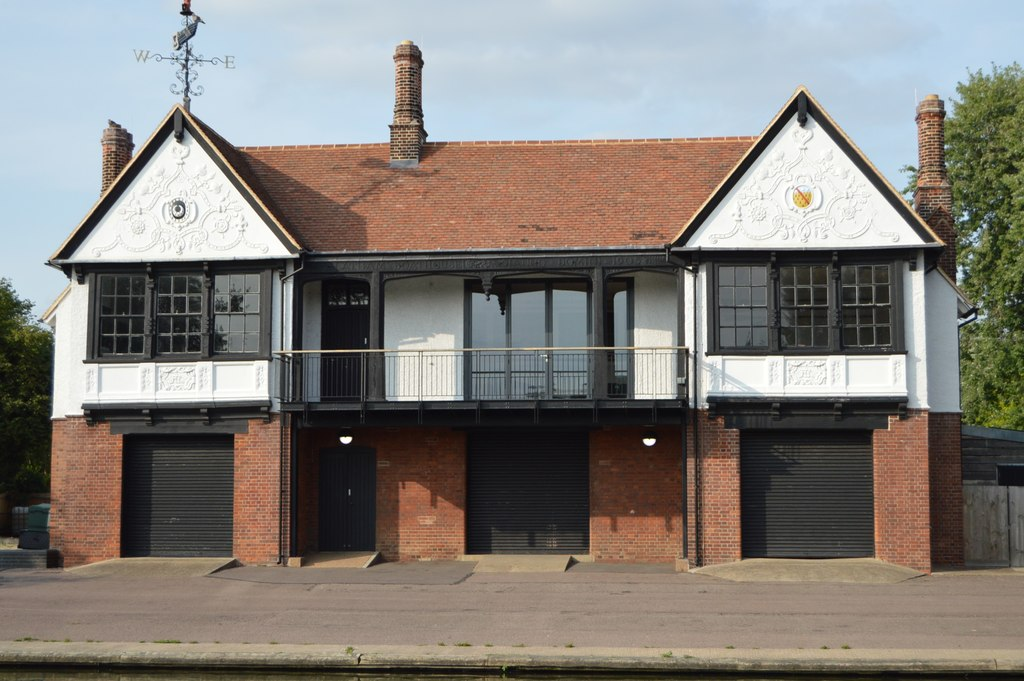
- View from opposite bank of the Cam
- Interactive map of the Latham-Scott Boathouse area
- Alternative names: Latham Boathouse, Trinity Hall Boathouse

General information
- Type: Boathouse
- Architectural style: Mock Tudor
- Location: Cambridge
- Coordinates: 52°12′39″N 0°07′55″E
- Named for: Henry Latham, Walter Grant Scott
- Year built: 1902-1905
- Renovated: 2014
- Owner: Trinity Hall, Cambridge

Design and construction
- Architects: Montague Wheeler, Kate Hearle

The Latham-Scott Boathouse is a historic building in Cambridge, England. Since its construction in 1902, it has served as the boathouse for Trinity Hall Boat Club.

The boathouse is in a Mock Tudor style, with two gable ends, a red tiled roof, and three large chimney-stacks. Each gable end displays a coat of arms, the left showing those of the college, and a carved wooden beam above the doorway reads: "Latham Boathouse Anno Domini 1905". The building is named for both Henry Latham, master of Trinity Hall between 1888 and 1902, and for the alumnus Walter Grant Scott. Both men donated significant funds to the construction and the renovation of the boathouse respectively.

Alongside storage racks for boats, the Latham-Scott Boathouse has a kitchen, changing rooms, both a weights and an ergometer gym, and space for debriefing and relaxation. Unusually for a Cambridge boathouse, it is only used by one college boat club.

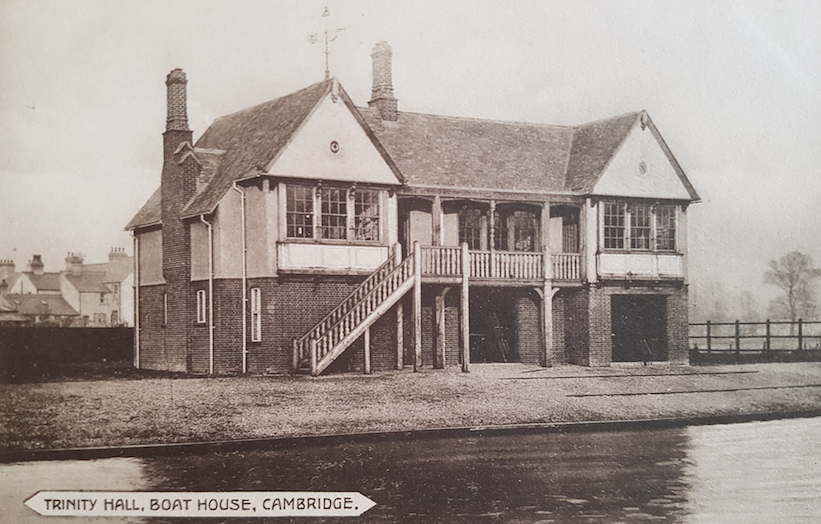
Old postcard of the Latham Boathouse in the early 20th century

The original architect was Montague Wheeler, another Trinity Hall alumnus who also designed the college's 1927 Gatehouse Building. Although plans were first discussed as early as 1885, work only began in 1902. More recent renovations in 2014 were designed by the Olympian Kate Hearle, who matriculated at the college in 1977.

The building now sits between the Jesus College boathouse upstream, and the Old Combined Boathouse, of Girton, Sidney Sussex, Corpus Christi and Wolfson college boat clubs, downstream.
