= Robert Braunch =

English academic

Robert Braunch was an English academic in the late 14th and early 15th centuries.

Braunch (some sources Branch) became Master of Trinity Hall, Cambridge in 1384. He died in 1413.

Preceded by Adam Wickmer	Master of Trinity Hall, Cambridge; 1384–1413	Succeeded by Henry Wells
