= Stephen Gardiner =

English bishop and politician (1483–1555)

The Right Reverend Stephen Gardiner
- Bishop of Winchester
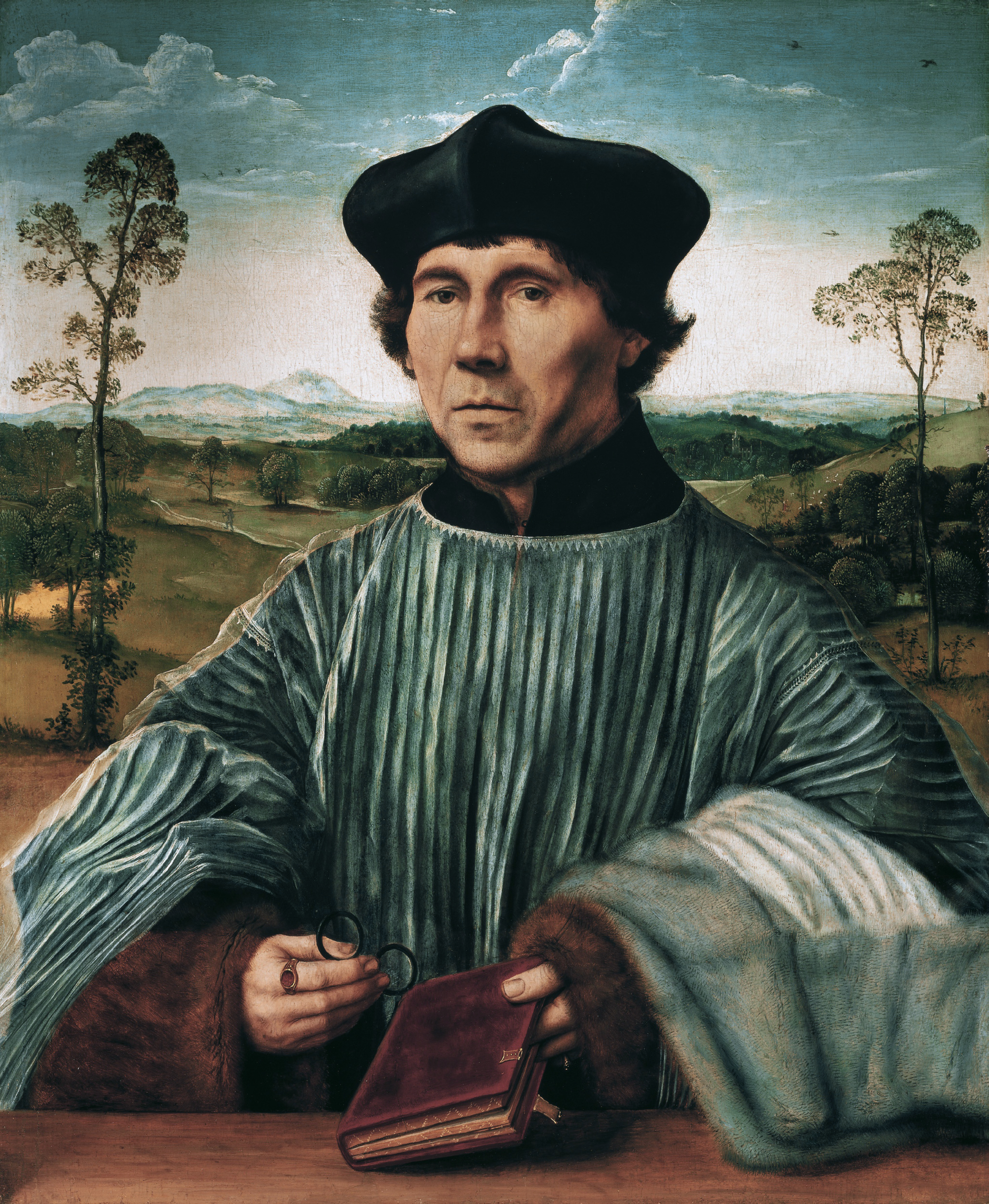
- Portrait by Quentin Matsys
- Church: Roman Catholic/Church of England
- Province: Canterbury
- Diocese: Winchester
- In office: 1531–1551, 1553–1555
- Other posts: Lord Chancellor; Master of Trinity Hall, Cambridge
- Previous posts: Archdeacon of Taunton; Archdeacon of Worcester; Archdeacon of Norfolk; Archdeacon of Leicester; Secretary of State

Orders
- Consecration: 3 December 1531

Personal details
- Born: 27 July 1483 Bury St Edmunds, England
- Died: 12 November 1555 (aged 72) England
- Buried: Winchester Cathedral; 51°03′38″N 1°18′47″W
- Denomination: Roman Catholic/Anglican
- Education: Trinity Hall, Cambridge

Stephen Gardiner (27 July 1483 – 12 November 1555) was an English Catholic bishop and politician during the English Reformation period who served as Lord Chancellor during the reign of Queen Mary I.

Skilled in canon law, he had a significant career as a civil servant and diplomat, being brought to King Henry VIII's attention when working for Cardinal Wolsey, then serving as the king's secretary. As a bishop, he was the most important religious conservative to retain his diocese during the later reign of Henry, supporting the king's claim as Supreme Governor of the Church of England. He spent most of the reign of Edward VI in prison, but was restored by Mary I of England, in whose reign he died.

== Early life ==
Gardiner was born in Bury St Edmunds, but the date of his birth is uncertain. His father could have been a John Gardiner, but also could have been William Gardiner, a substantial cloth merchant of the town where he was born, who took care to give him a good education. His mother was said to be Ellen or Helen Tudor, an illegitimate daughter of Jasper Tudor, 1st Duke of Bedford, but American research from 2011 suggests that this lady was the mother of a different cleric, Thomas Gardiner.

In 1511 Gardiner, aged 28, met Erasmus in Paris. He had probably already begun his studies at Trinity Hall, Cambridge, where he distinguished himself in the classics, especially in Greek. He then devoted himself to canon and civil law, in which subjects he attained so great a proficiency that no one could dispute his pre-eminence. He received the degree of doctor of civil law in 1520, and of canon law in the following year.

== Diplomatic career ==
Before long his abilities attracted the notice of Cardinal Thomas Wolsey, who made him his secretary, and in this capacity he is said to have been with him at The More in Hertfordshire, when the conclusion of the celebrated Treaty of the More brought King Henry VIII and the French ambassadors there. This was probably the occasion on which he first came to the King's notice, but he does not appear to have been actively engaged in Henry's service till three years later. He undoubtedly acquired a knowledge of foreign politics in the service of Wolsey.

In 1527 he and Sir Thomas More were named commissioners on the part of England, in arranging a treaty with the French ambassadors for the support of an army in Italy against Charles V, Holy Roman Emperor. As a canon lawyer, he was sent to Orvieto in 1527 to secure a decretal commission from Pope Clement VII to allow the King's divorce case to be tried in England. In 1535 he was also appointed ambassador to France, where he remained for three years.

== Role in the royal divorce ==
That year he accompanied Wolsey on his important diplomatic mission to France, the splendour and magnificence of which have been graphically described by George Cavendish in his biography of Wolsey. Among the Cardinal's retinue – including several noblemen and privy councillors – Gardiner alone seems to have understood the importance of this embassy. Henry was particularly anxious to cement his alliance with King Francis I of France, and gain support for his plans to divorce Catherine of Aragon. In the course of his progress through France, Wolsey received orders from Henry to send back his secretary, Gardiner, for fresh instructions. Wolsey was obliged to reply that he positively could not spare Gardiner as he was the only instrument he had in advancing the king's "Great Matter". The next year, Wolsey sent Gardiner and Edward Foxe, provost of King's College, Cambridge, to Italy to promote the same business with the Pope. His dispatched messages have survived, and illustrate the competence with which Gardiner performed his duties.

Gardiner's familiarity with canon law gave him a great advantage. He was instructed to procure a decretal commission from the Pope, which was intended to construct principles of law by which Wolsey might render a decision on the validity of the King's marriage without appeal. Though supported by plausible pretexts, the demand was received as unusual and inadmissible. Pope Clement VII, who had been recently forced to seek refuge in Castel Sant'Angelo by mutinous soldiers of the Holy Roman Empire, had managed to escape to Orvieto. Now fearful of offending Charles V, nephew of Queen Catherine, Clement refused to issue a definitive ruling concerning Henry's annulment. The matter was instead referred to his cardinals, with whom Gardiner held long debates.

Gardiner's pleading was unsuccessful. Though the issue had not been specifically resolved, a general commission was granted, enabling Wolsey, along with Papal Legate, Cardinal Lorenzo Campeggio, to try the case in England. While grateful to the Pope for the small concession, Wolsey viewed this as inadequate for the purpose in view. He urged Gardiner to press Clement VII further to deliver the desired decretal, even if it were only to be shown to the King and himself and then destroyed. Otherwise Wolsey feared he would lose his credit with Henry, who might be tempted to discard his allegiance to Rome. However, Clement VII made no further concessions at the time and Gardiner returned home. The two legates held their court under the guidelines of the general commission.

== King's secretary, conservative and absolutist ==
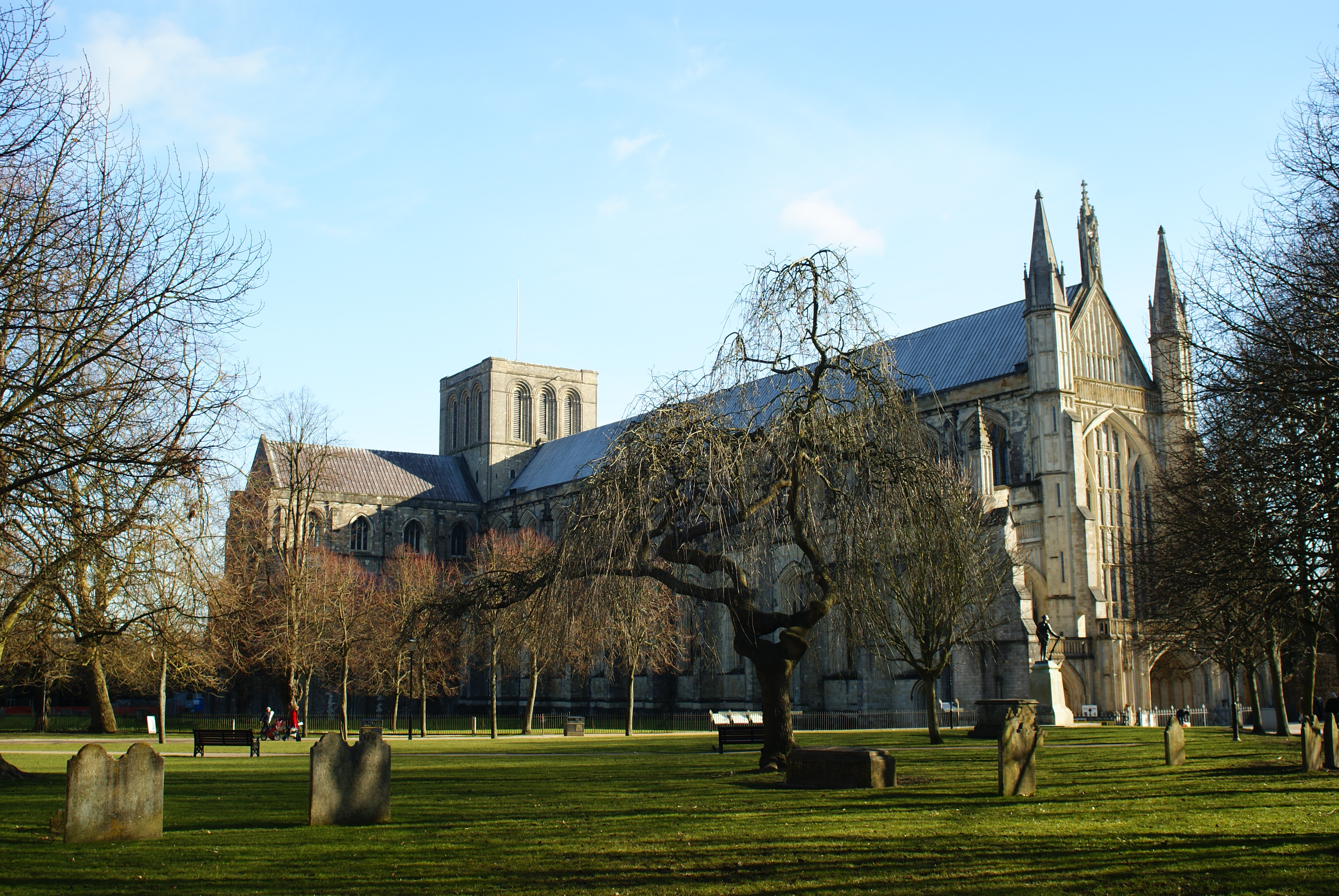
Gardiner's seat, Winchester Cathedral

Gardiner was a conservative, nationalist and an opponent of Anne Boleyn, Thomas Cranmer, Thomas Cromwell and of any innovation in the Church, although he acquiesced grudgingly in the steadily increasing influence of the Reformation on the royal counsels. A description of his character from George Cavendish declared him "a swarthy complexion, hooked nose, deep-set eyes, a permanent frown, huge hands and a vengeful wit. He was ambitious, sure of himself, irascible, astute, and worldly."

In early August 1529 he was appointed the King's secretary. He had already been archdeacon of Taunton for several years. The archdeaconries of Worcester and of Norfolk were also added to a list of pluralities before November 1529 and in March 1530 respectively; in April 1531 he resigned all three for that of Leicester. In 1530 the King demanded a precedent from Cambridge to procure the decision of the university as to the unlawfulness of marriage with a deceased brother's wife: in accordance with the new plan devised for settling the question without the Pope's intervention. In this Gardiner succeeded. In November 1531 the King rewarded him with the bishopric of Winchester, vacant since Wolsey's death. The unexpected promotion was accompanied by expressions from the King which made it still more honourable, showing that if he had been subservient, it was not for the sake of his own advancement. Gardiner had, in fact, argued boldly with the King on some points, and Henry now reminded him of the fact. "I have often squared with you, Gardiner," he said familiarly, "but I love you never the worse, as the bishopric I give will convince you." In 1532, nevertheless, he displeased the King by taking part in the preparation of the "Answer of the Ordinaries" to the complaints brought against them in the House of Commons. On this subject he wrote to the King in his own defence.

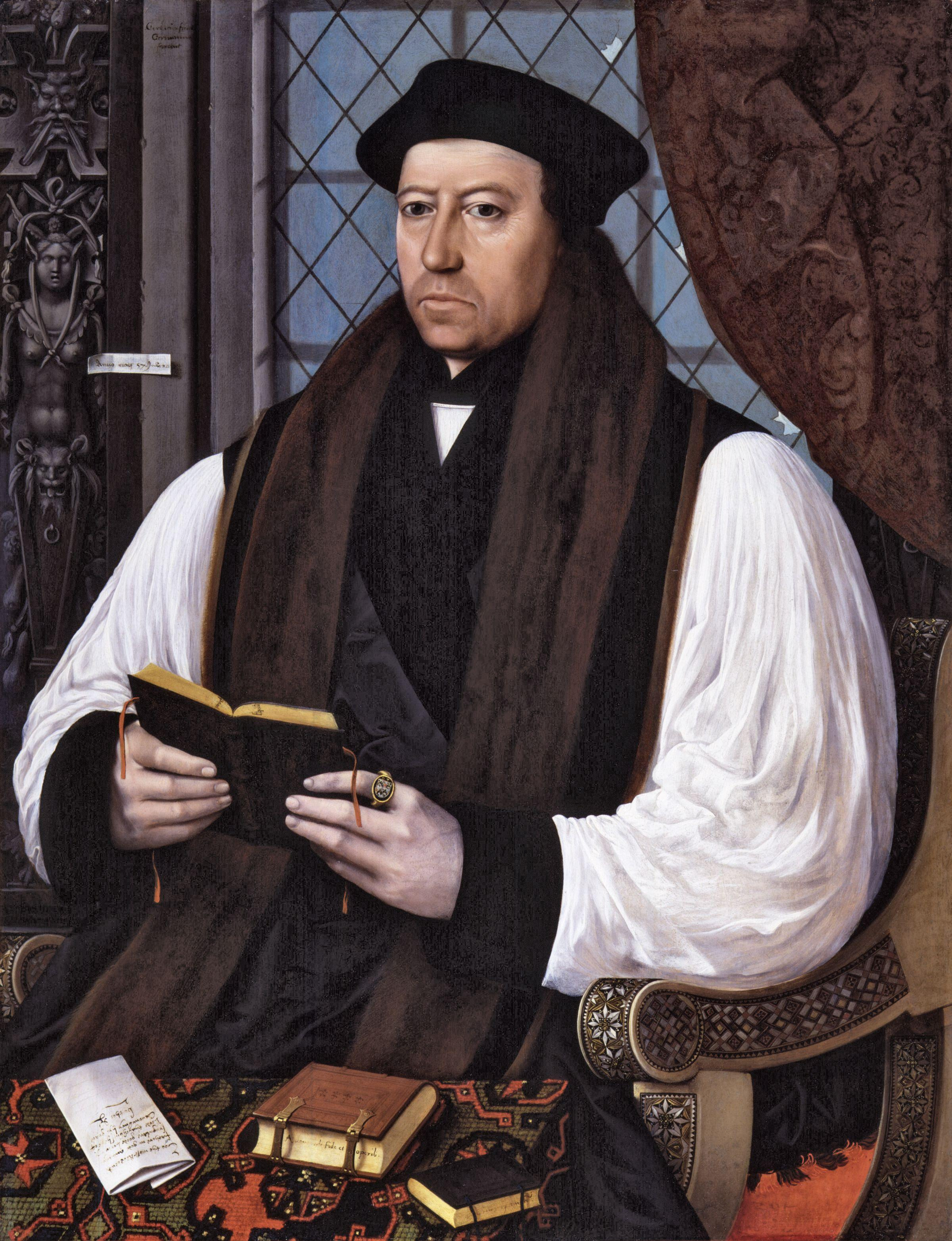
Thomas Cranmer became an enemy of Gardiner.

Gardiner was not exactly, as is often said, one of Cranmer's assessors, but, according to Cranmer's own expression, "assistant" to him as counsel for the king, when the archbishop, in the absence of Queen Catherine, pronounced her marriage with Henry null and void on 23 May 1533. Immediately afterwards he was sent to Marseille, where an interview between the Pope and Francis I took place in September. Henry was deeply suspicious, as Francis, ostensibly his ally, had previously maintained the justice of his cause in the matter of the divorce. It was at this interview that Edmund Bonner intimated the appeal of Henry VIII to a general council in case the Pope should venture to proceed to sentence against him. This appeal, and another on behalf of Cranmer presented with it, were drawn up by Gardiner.

In 1535 he and other bishops were called upon to vindicate the King's new title of "Supreme Head of the Church of England." The result was his celebrated treatise De vera obedientia, the ablest of all the vindications of royal supremacy. "Princes ought to be obeyed", wrote Gardiner, "by the commandment of God; yea, and to be obeyed without question". He certainly believed in the semi-divinity of kings, and the divine majesty's right to rule as if the King's law was God's law. In the same year he had a dispute with Cranmer about the visitation of his diocese. He was also employed to answer the Pope's brief threatening to deprive Henry of his kingdom.

During the next few years he took part in various embassies to France and Germany. He was often so abroad, having little influence on the King's councils; but in 1539 he took part in the enactment of the Six Articles, which led to the resignation of Bishops Hugh Latimer and Nicholas Shaxton and the persecution of the Protestant party. In 1540, on the execution of Thomas Cromwell, he was elected chancellor of the University of Cambridge. A few years later he attempted, in concert with others, to fasten a charge of heresy upon Archbishop Cranmer in connection with the Six Articles and would, but for the personal intervention of the king, probably have succeeded.

Despite having supported royal supremacy, he was a thorough opponent of the Reformation from a doctrinal point of view, and is thought to have been a leader of the Prebendaries' Plot against Cranmer. He had not approved of Henry's general treatment of the church, especially during the ascendancy of Cromwell. In 1544 a relation of his, named German Gardiner, whom he employed as his secretary, was executed for treason in reference to the King's supremacy, and his enemies insinuated to the King that he himself was of his secretary's way of thinking. The King had need of him quite as much as he had of Cranmer; for it was Gardiner who, even under royal supremacy, was anxious to prove that England had not fallen away from the faith, while Cranmer's authority as primate was necessary to upholding that supremacy.

Thus Gardiner and the Archbishop maintained opposite sides of the King's church policy; and though Gardiner was encouraged by the King to put up articles against the archbishop for heresy, the Archbishop could always rely on the King's protection in the end. Protestantism was gaining ground in high places, especially after the King's marriage to Catherine Parr; the Queen herself was nearly committed for it at one time, when Gardiner, with the King's approbation, censured some of her expressions in conversation. Just after her marriage, four men of the court were condemned at Windsor and three of them were burned. The fourth, who was the theologian and composer John Merbecke, was pardoned by Gardiner's procurement, who said he was "but a musician".

In 1546 Gardiner was the significant person involved in a conservative plot to discredit Maud Lane who was Catherine Parr's cousin, gentlewoman and confidante. The plan was to find evidence of her heresy but the plot failed and plans to kidnap the Queen and two of her ladies were not enacted. Gardiner's position was reduced by this.

== Edward VI's reign ==
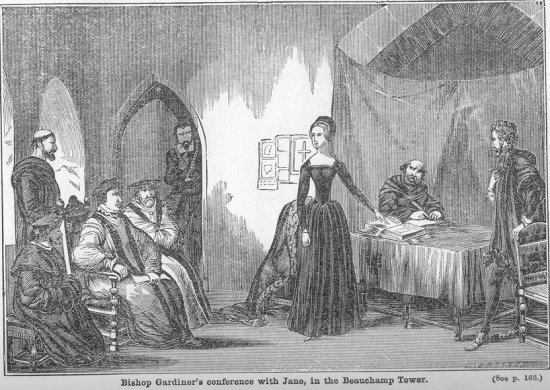
Bishop Gardiner's Conference with Lady Jane Grey, from the Victorian Pictorial Tower of London

Great as Gardiner's influence had been with Henry VIII, his name was omitted from the King's will, though Henry was believed to have intended making him one of his executors. Henry had made provision in his will for a 16-man Council to rule England during his son Edward's minority. Gardiner was excluded from this council. Edward Seymour, a brother of Jane Seymour, seized power as Lord Protector and he and his council introduced radical Protestant reforms. Gardiner completely opposed these reforms. Between the time of Henry VIII's death in January 1547 and the end of that year, Gardiner wrote at least 25 indignant letters arguing that the reforms were both theologically wrong and unconstitutional. Most of these letters were addressed to Somerset. He resisted the visitation of his Winchester diocese by the ecclesiastical authorities. His remonstrances resulted in imprisonment in the Fleet and the visitation of his diocese was held during his incarceration. Although soon released, he was summoned before the council, which demanded an explanation. Refusing to answer satisfactorily on some points, Gardiner was imprisoned in the Tower of London in June 1548. Eventually he was given a lengthy appearance before the Privy Council, beginning in December 1550 and, in February 1551 he was deprived of his bishopric and returned to the Tower where he remained for the rest of the reign (a further two years). During this time he unsuccessfully requested his acknowledged right as one of the Lords Spiritual to appear before the House of Lords. His bishopric was given to John Ponet, a chaplain of Cranmer, translated from the bishopric of Rochester.

== Mary I's reign ==
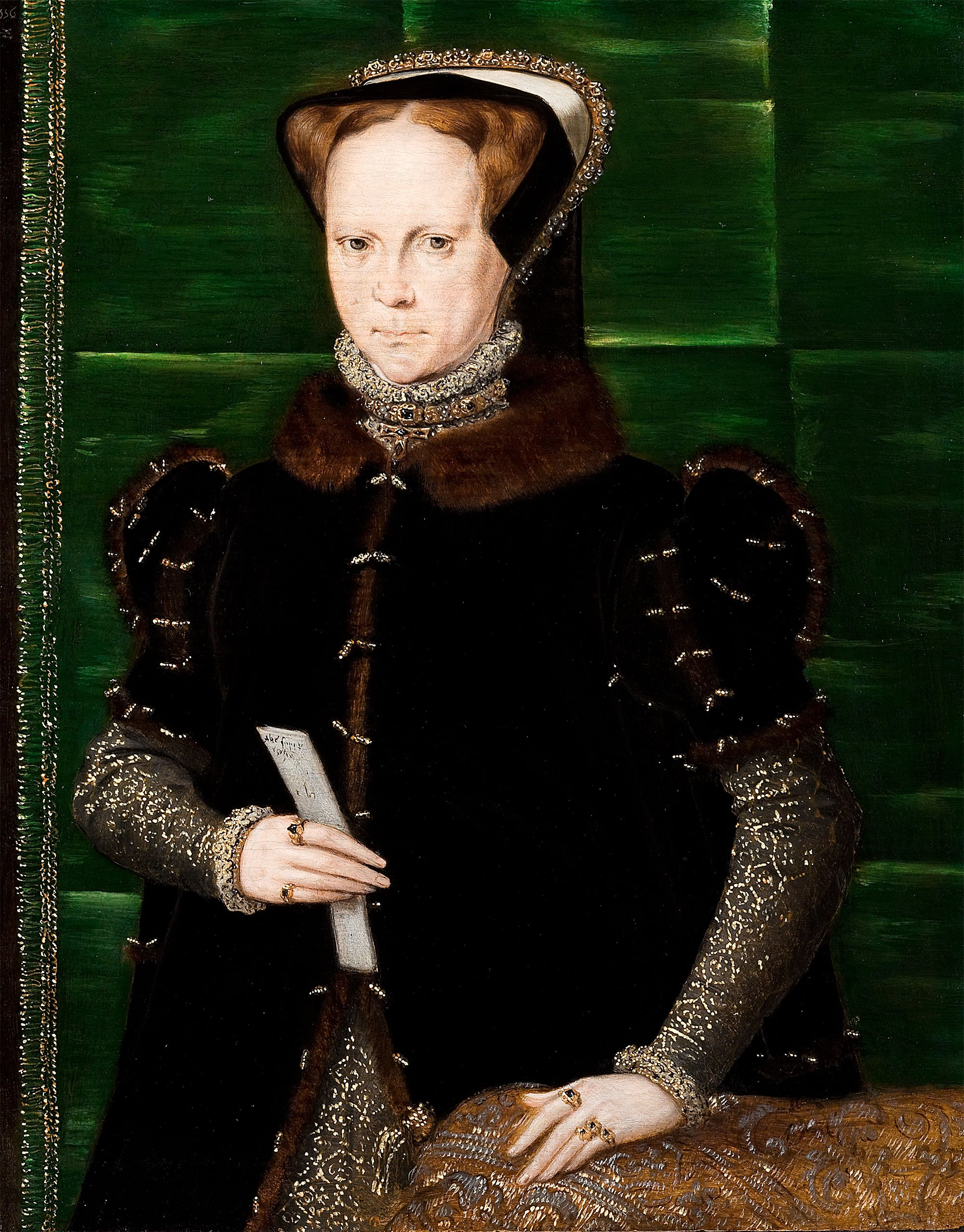
Queen Mary, by Hans Eworth

At the accession of Queen Mary I, Thomas Howard, 3rd Duke of Norfolk, and other state prisoners of high rank were in the Tower along with Gardiner; but the Queen, on her first entry into London, set them all free. Gardiner was restored to his bishopric and appointed Lord Chancellor, and he placed the crown on the Queen's head at her coronation. He also opened her first parliament and for some time was her leading councillor. He was now also called upon, in old age, to undo not a little of the work in which he had been instrumental in his earlier years – to demonstrate the legitimacy of the Queen's birth and the legality of her mother's marriage, to restore the old religion, and to recant his own words touching the royal supremacy.

It is said that he wrote a formal Palinodia or retraction of his book De vera obedientia; but the reference is probably to his sermon at the start of Advent, 1554, after Cardinal (later Archbishop of Canterbury) Reginald Pole had absolved the kingdom from schism. As chancellor he had the onerous task of negotiating the Queen's marriage treaty with Philip II of Spain, for which he shared a general repugnance. In executing it, he took care to make the terms as advantageous for England as possible, with express provision that the Spaniards should in no way be allowed to interfere in the government of the country. After the appointment of Cardinal Pole, and the reconciliation of the realm to the see of Rome, he still remained in high favour. How far he was responsible for the persecutions which afterwards arose is open to debate. He no doubt approved of the act, which passed the House of Lords while he presided there as lord chancellor, for the revival of the heresy laws.

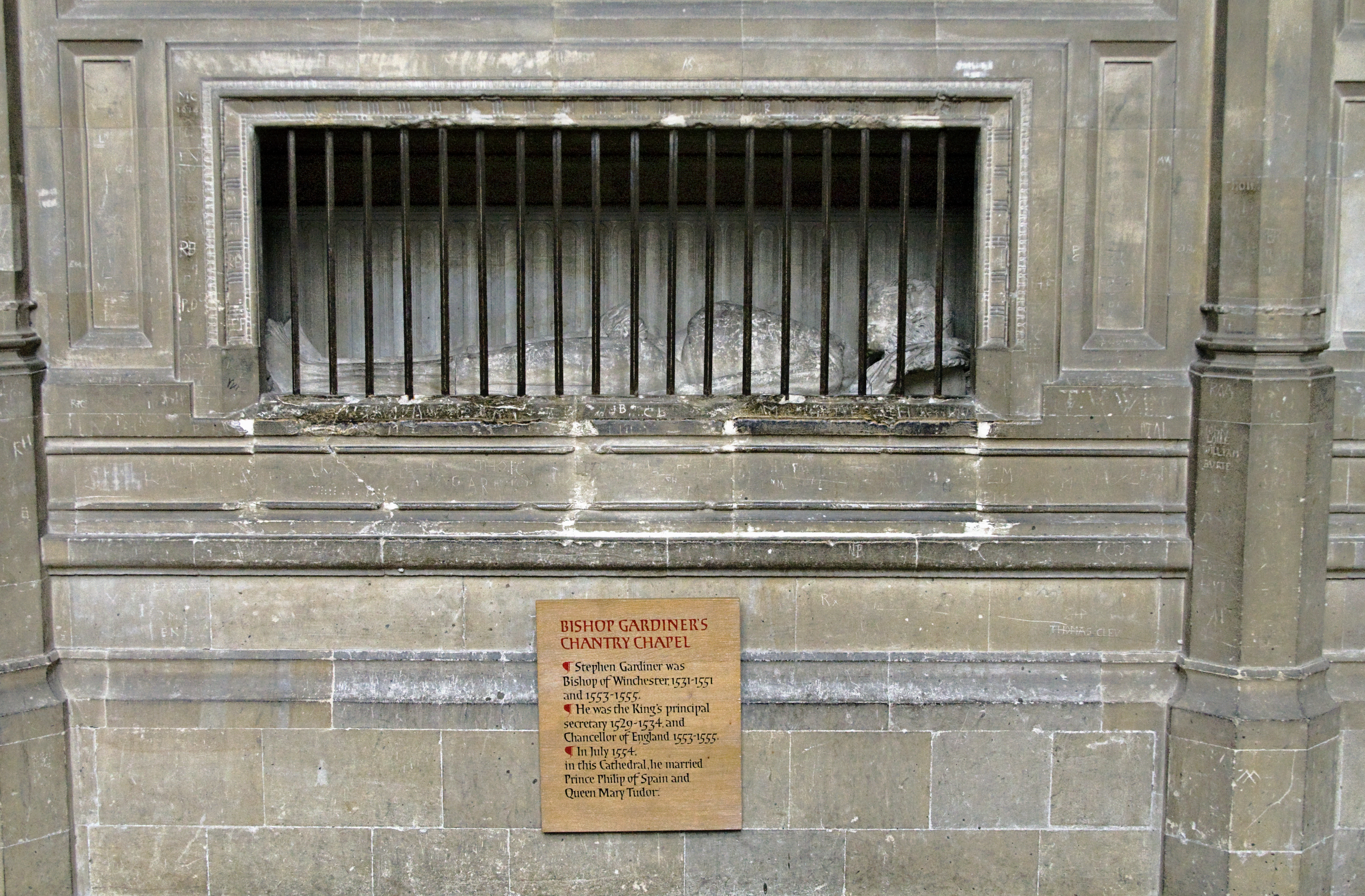
Gardiner's chantry tomb in Winchester Cathedral

There is no doubt that he sat in judgment on Bishop John Hooper, and on several other preachers whom he condemned to be degraded from the priesthood. The natural consequence of this was that when they declined, even as laymen, to be reconciled to the Roman Church, they were handed over to the secular power to be burned. In his diocese no victim of the persecution is known to have suffered until after his death; and, much as he was already maligned by opponents, there is much to show that his personality was generous and humane. In May 1555 he went to Calais as one of the English commissioners to promote peace with France; but their efforts were ineffectual. In October 1555 he again opened parliament as Lord Chancellor, but towards the end of the month he fell ill and grew rapidly worse until he died.

== Death ==
Bishop Gardiner died at Westminster on 12 November 1555. He was temporarily buried in a vault at the church of St Mary Overie, and in February 1556 his body was conveyed to Winchester Cathedral, where, after a number of ceremonies, a final funeral service was conducted on 28 February 1556, at which time it was recorded that he had not been buried and that no ground was broken, in the expectation that in due course his executors would build a chapel within the cathedral for his entombment. Some claim that his last words were Erravi cum Petro, sed non flevi cum Petro (I have erred with Peter, but I have not wept with Peter).

== Fictional portrayals ==
Gardiner plays an important part in William Shakespeare and John Fletcher’s play Henry VIII.

Bishop Gardiner is a character in The Fifth Queen trilogy by Ford Madox Ford. Gardiner is also a major character in The Path to Somerset by Janet Wertman, which centres on his rivalry with the rising Edward Seymour, 1st Duke of Somerset.

Gardiner is a prominent character in Hilary Mantel's Wolf Hall, Bring Up the Bodies and The Mirror & the Light, in which he appears as an implacable opponent of Thomas Cromwell. In the television adaptation Wolf Hall, Gardiner is portrayed by Mark Gatiss. In the second series, based on the third book, Alex Jennings plays Gardiner.

Gardiner is the villain in Alison MacLeod's 1965 historical novel The Heretic, a biography of the Protestant martyr Anne Askew, of whose execution Gardiner was the main instigator.

Gardiner is played by Terence Rigby in the 1998 film Elizabeth, in which he is portrayed as a villainous bishop who took part in the Ridolfi plot and who vehemently opposed Elizabeth I's Act of Uniformity; in reality, Gardiner had died before Elizabeth ascended the throne. A more accurate portrayal of Gardiner can be seen in the BBC dramas The Six Wives of Henry VIII and Elizabeth R (in both of which he is played by Basil Dignam). In The Tudors television series Gardiner is played by Simon Ward.

In the 2022 Starz series Becoming Elizabeth Bishop Gardiner is portrayed by Alex Macqueen. In the 2023 film Firebrand, Simon Russell Beale portrays Gardiner.

== See also ==
- Secretary of State (England)
- Privy Councillor

Religious titles
Preceded by John Monyns	Archdeacon of Taunton; 1526–1531	Succeeded by Thomas Cranmer
Preceded by Thomas Alcock	Archdeacon of Worcester bef. 1529–1531	Succeeded by William Claybrooke
Preceded by Thomas Wynter	Archdeacon of Norfolk; 1530–1531	Succeeded by William Newton
Preceded by Richard Maudeley	Archdeacon of Leicester; March–December 1531	Succeeded by Edward Foxe
Preceded by Thomas Wolsey	Bishop of Winchester; 1st term: 1531–1551	Succeeded by John Ponet
Preceded by John Ponet	Bishop of Winchester; 2nd term: 1553–1555	Succeeded by John White
Political offices
Preceded by William Knight	Secretary of State; 1528–1534	Succeeded by Thomas Cromwell
Preceded by Thomas Goodrich as Keeper of the Great Seal	Lord Chancellor; 1553–1555	Succeeded by Nicholas Heath
Academic offices
Preceded by Thomas Larke	Master of Trinity Hall, Cambridge; 1st term: 1525–1549	Succeeded by Walter Haddon
Preceded by William Mowse	Master of Trinity Hall, Cambridge; 2nd term: 1553–1555	Succeeded by William Mowse
