= Marmaduke Lumley =

15th-century Bishop of Carlisle, Bishop of Lincoln, and Treasurer of England

- Bishop of Lincoln
- Appointed: late 1450
- Term ended: December 1450
- Predecessor: William of Alnwick
- Successor: John Chadworth
- Previous posts: Bishop of Carlisle; Precentor of Lincoln Cathedral

Orders
- Consecration: 16 April 1430

Personal details
- Died: December 1450
- Denomination: Catholic

Marmaduke Lumley

Lord High Treasurer
- In office 18 December, 1446 – 16 September, 1449
- Preceded by: Ralph Boteler
- Succeeded by: James Fiennes

Marmaduke Lumley (died 1450) was an English priest, Bishop of Carlisle from 1429 to 1450, and Knight Commander of the Order of St. John of Jerusalem. He was a son of Ralph de Lumley, 1st Baron Lumley and Eleanor de Neville. He was elected about 5 December 1429, and consecrated on 16 April 1430. He was Bishop of Lincoln for a short time before his death in December 1450. He was educated at University of Cambridge and was appointed Precentor of Lincoln Cathedral in 1425. He also became Chancellor of the University of Cambridge in 1427 and was Master of Trinity Hall, Cambridge from 1429 to 1443. From 1446 to 1449 he served as Lord High Treasurer of England. Lumley's tenure as Lord High Treasurer occurred during the Great Bullion Famine and the Great Slump in England.

His administrator was a clerk of Lichfield, John Whelpdale.

== Citations ==
Political offices
| Preceded by The Lord Sudeley | Lord High Treasurer; 1446–1449 | Succeeded by The Lord Saye and Sele |
Catholic Church titles
| Preceded by William Barrow | Bishop of Carlisle; 1429–1450 | Succeeded by Nicholas Close |
| Preceded by William Alnwick | Bishop of Lincoln; 1450 | Succeeded by John Chadworth |
Academic offices
| Preceded by Henry Wells | Master of Trinity Hall, Cambridge; 1429–1443 | Succeeded by Simon Dalling |
