= Edward Beck (academic) =

British academic

Edward Anthony Beck (21 March 1848 - 12 April 1916) was a British academic in the last third of the 19th century and the first decades of the 20th.

Beck was educated at Bishop's Stortford College and Trinity Hall, Cambridge, where he was to spend the rest of his career. He was Scholar in 1867; Chancellor's English Medallist, 1868 and 1870; Fellow from 1871 to 1902; Seatonian Prizeman in 1874; Assistant Tutor in 1875; Junior Tutor in 1885; Senior Tutor in 1887; and Senior proctor from 1881 to 1888, when he became Vice Master. He was Master of Trinity Hall, Cambridge from his election in November 1902 until his death; and Vice-Chancellor of the University of Cambridge from 1904 until 1906.

== Personal life ==
On 30 December 1874, Beck married Emily Mary Clark with whom he later had five children. Edward Ashton Anthony was born in 1877, Bernard Redin in 1879, Emily Dorothy in 1881, Barbara Daisy was born in 1882 and Millicent Sarah was born in 1883.

Academic offices
Preceded by Henry Latham	Masters of Trinity Hall, Cambridge; 1902—1916	Succeeded by Henry Bond
Preceded by Frederic Henry Chase	Vice-Chancellor of the University of Cambridge; 1904—1906	Succeeded by Ernest Stewart Roberts
