= Henry Lucas (politician) =

English clergyman and politician

Arms of Lucas of Little Saxham, Suffolk and Shenfield, Essex: Argent, a fess between six annulets gules

The Reverend Henry Lucas (c. 1610 – July 1663) was an English clergyman and politician who sat in the House of Commons from 1640 to 1648.

== Early life and education ==
Lucas was born in London, England, in approximately 1610. His father was Edward Lucas of Thriplow, Cambridgeshire. Lucas was a student at St John's College at the University of Cambridge.

== Career ==
Lucas became secretary to Henry Rich, 1st Earl of Holland. In April 1640, he was elected Member of Parliament for Cambridge University in the Short Parliament. He was re-elected MP for Cambridge University for the Long Parliament in November 1640. He was excluded from parliament in 1648 under Pride's Purge.

== Death ==
Lucas died unmarried in Chancery Lane, London, on 22 July 1663, and was buried in Temple Church.

== Legacy ==
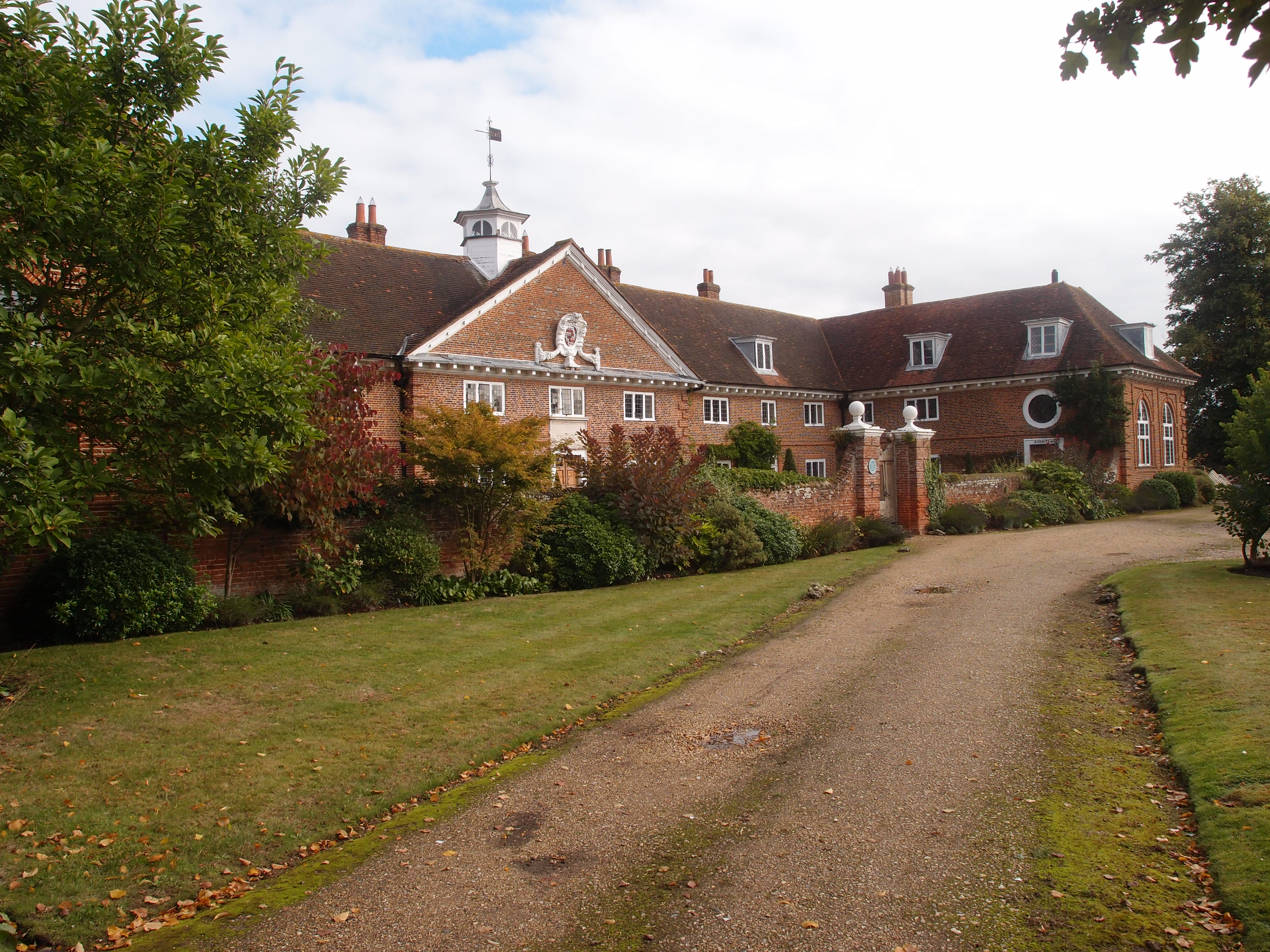
Lucas Hospital, Wokingham

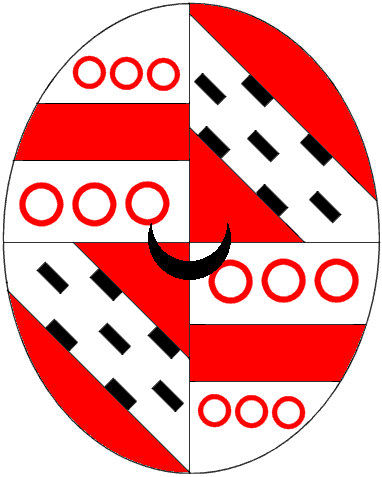
Coat of Arms used at Lucas Hospital

In his will, Lucas founded the Henry Lucas Charity with a bequest of £7,000, to be spent on building an almshouse for poor old men and on employing a chaplain as its Master. The men were to be chosen from the poorest inhabitants of the Forest Division of Berkshire and the Bailiwick of Surrey in or near the Forest. The original Hospital was built by Lucas’s executors on 1.5 acres (6,000 m²) of land in Wokingham in 1666. On the death of the executors in 1675, the Drapers' Company of the City of London inherited the trusteeship of the Hospital. In 1923 an Act of Parliament dissolved the ancient Corporation, and provided for the admission of married couples, and for the employment of a Matron.

By 1999, the original building was no longer suitable for use as a modern almshouse. The original Hospital was sold and in July 2002 the Henry Lucas Charity was merged with the Whiteley Homes Trust. Sixteen double cottages were built in Whiteley Village near Walton-on-Thames in Surrey to provide accommodation for more than twice as many people as was possible in the Hospital, and are known as The Henry Lucas Cottages.

The Drapers used a coat of arms to commemorate Lucas on the Henry Lucas Cottages at Whiteley Village, copying that on Lucas Hospital. This can be described as: Quarterly with a crescent for difference on the fess point: 1 and 4, Argent, a fesse between six annulets gules; 2 and 3, Gules, on a bend argent, seven billets one two one two and one palewise of the bend sable, a quartering of the Lucas and Morieux families' coats of arms.

Lucas bequeathed his collection of 4,000 books, including Galileo's Dialogo of 1632, to University Library at the University of Cambridge, along with enough land to provide roughly £100 a year, which was designated for funding a professorship of "mathematick", which is now the Lucasian Professorship of Mathematics.

Parliament of England
Vacant Parliament suspended since 1629	Member of Parliament for Cambridge University; 1640–1648; With: Thomas Eden 1640–1644; Nathaniel Bacon 1645–1648	Succeeded by Nathaniel Bacon
