= Edward Simpson (Master of Trinity Hall, Cambridge) =

English Member of Parliament

Sir Edward Simpson, (c..1699 – 20 May 1764) of Acton, Middlesex was an English politician, lawyer and academic.

He was the son of Francis Simpson of Fishlake, Yorkshire and educated at Trinity Hall, Cambridge, graduating LL.B in 1724 and LL.D in 1728. He entered Lincoln's Inn to study law in 1719 and was called to the bar in 1726.

He was a Fellow of Trinity Hall from 1724 to 1735, and its Master from then until his death. He was Vice-Chancellor of the University of Cambridge from 1740 to 1741.

He became an advocate in the Doctors' Commons in 1736 and Chancellor of the Diocese of Bath and Wells in 1738. Simpson was a "senior civil lawyer": Judge of the Consistory courtof London from 1747 to 1758; then Judge of the Prerogative Court, Canterbury and Dean of the Arches from 1758 until his death. He also served as a Judge of the Cinque Ports.

Simpson was also M.P. for Dover from 1759 until his death and was knighted in December 1761.

He died on 20 May 1764, having married in 1750, Elizabeth Foster of St. Olave, Old Jewry. They had no children.
