= Adam Wickmer =

English priest and academic

Adam Wickmer (died 1383) was an English priest and academic in the 14th century.

Wickmer (some sources Walker) became Master of Trinity Hall, Cambridge in 1355. He held livings at South Malling and Hockwold.

Preceded by Robert de Stretton	Master of Trinity Hall, Cambridge; 1355–1384	Succeeded by Robert Braunch
