= Middlefield, Stapleford =

Mansion in Stapleford, Cambridgeshire, England

Coordinates: 52.15447°N 0.16184°E

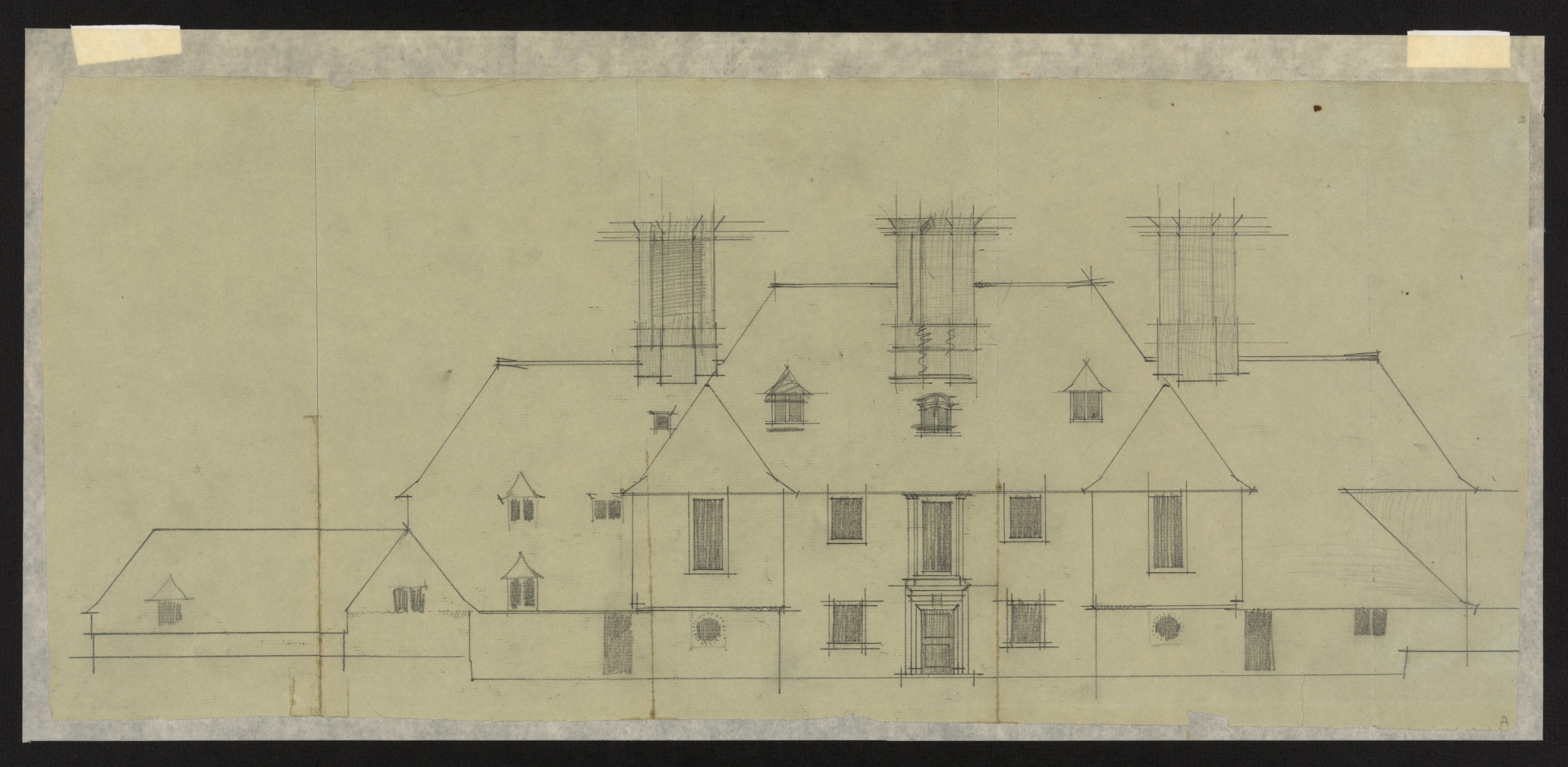
Sketch by the architect Edwin Lutyens

Middlefield is a mansion in Stapleford, Cambridgeshire, England, designed in 1908–9 by Edwin Lutyens. It is a grade II* listed building.

Middlefield was designed for Henry Bond, a lecturer in Roman Law at Trinity College and Trinity Hall, University of Cambridge, and subsequently the Master of Trinity Hall. The red-brick house is characterised by a symmetrical frontage, three large chimney blocks, and large tiled hipped roofs with low flanking eaves.
