= William Dalling =

English priest and academic

William Dalling, DCL was an English priest and academic in the 15th century.

Dalling was Master of Trinity Hall, Cambridge from 1471 to 1501. He held livings at Huntingdon and Over.
