= Thomas Gardiner (monk) =

English monk and chronicler (fl. 1507-1542)

Thomas Gardiner (fl. 1507-1542), was a monk of Westminster Abbey who wrote a chronicle of English history from Brutus of Britain to the seventh year of Henry VIII, entitled The Flowers of England. The only manuscript, which is among the Cotton MSS. (Otho C. vi.), was badly damaged by fire. He also wrote a genealogical roll of Tudor ancestry.

== Life ==
Gardiner may be identical to the Thomas Gardiner who was the son of Helen Tudor, illegitimate daughter of Jasper Tudor. She married a London businessman named William Gardiner. Helen's son Thomas is known to have entered Westminster Abbey as a monk.

Gardiner seems to have studied at Oxford and Cambridge universities. Henry VII appointed Gardiner Prior of Blythe in 1507. He later became Prior of Tynemouth. On his return to Westminster he became a priest in the king's chantry. After the dissolution of the monasteries Gardiner has been described as an "ex-monk turned propagandist", dedicated to promoting Henry VIII.

== Writings ==
Gardiner was responsible for two known writings, both of which represent traditional medieval styles of history writing which were already old-fashioned. The Flowers of England was a largely uncritical chronology combining legend with history. His genealogical roll for Henry VIII was similar in character, designed to confirm the noble ancestry of the Tudors. This was presented to the king in 1542.

The roll gave Henry VIII a pedigree showing his descent from Cadwallader, referred to as "the laste kynge of that blode from whome by trew and lynyall descensse" the Tudors descended. Gardiner also claimed that Henry was descended from Alfred the Great, William the Conqueror and Hugh Capet, which he was.
