= Old Combined Boathouse =

Boathouse in Cambridge, England

- View from opposite bank of the Cam
- Alternative names: Girton, Sidney Sussex, Corpus Christi and Wolfson Colleges' boathouse

General information
- Status: Grade II
- Type: Boathouse
- Architectural style: Brutalist
- Location: Cutter Ferry Lane, Cambridge
- Coordinates: 52°12′39″N 0°07′57″E
- Year built: 1958-9, 1980s
- Cost: £13,000

Design and construction
- Architect: David Wyn Roberts

The Old Combined Boathouse is a Grade II listed historic building on the River Cam, Cambridge, England. Built in 1958, it serves as the boathouse for Girton, Sidney Sussex, Corpus Christi, and Wolfson college boat clubs.

When built, Old Combined was the first combined college boathouse in Cambridge. The adjective 'old' being in reference to the New Combined Boathouse, further downstream, the current iteration of which was completed in 2016.

Unlike some other college boathouses, Old Combined does not contain an ergometer room or a place to display or store trophies or blades, the Official List Entry instead describing the first floor changing rooms as 'spartan'. In the 1980s, two wings were added to the ground floor structure, in part to hold Wolfson's boats.

As with many Cambridge boathouses, the arms of the colleges are displayed on the outside, between the concertina doors. Four flag-poles fly the respective college or boat club flags on the days of the Lent or May Bumps.

Old Combined sits between the boathouses of Trinity Hall and Newnham, upstream and downstream respectively, near the similarly listed Goldie Boat House of the Cambridge University Boat Club.

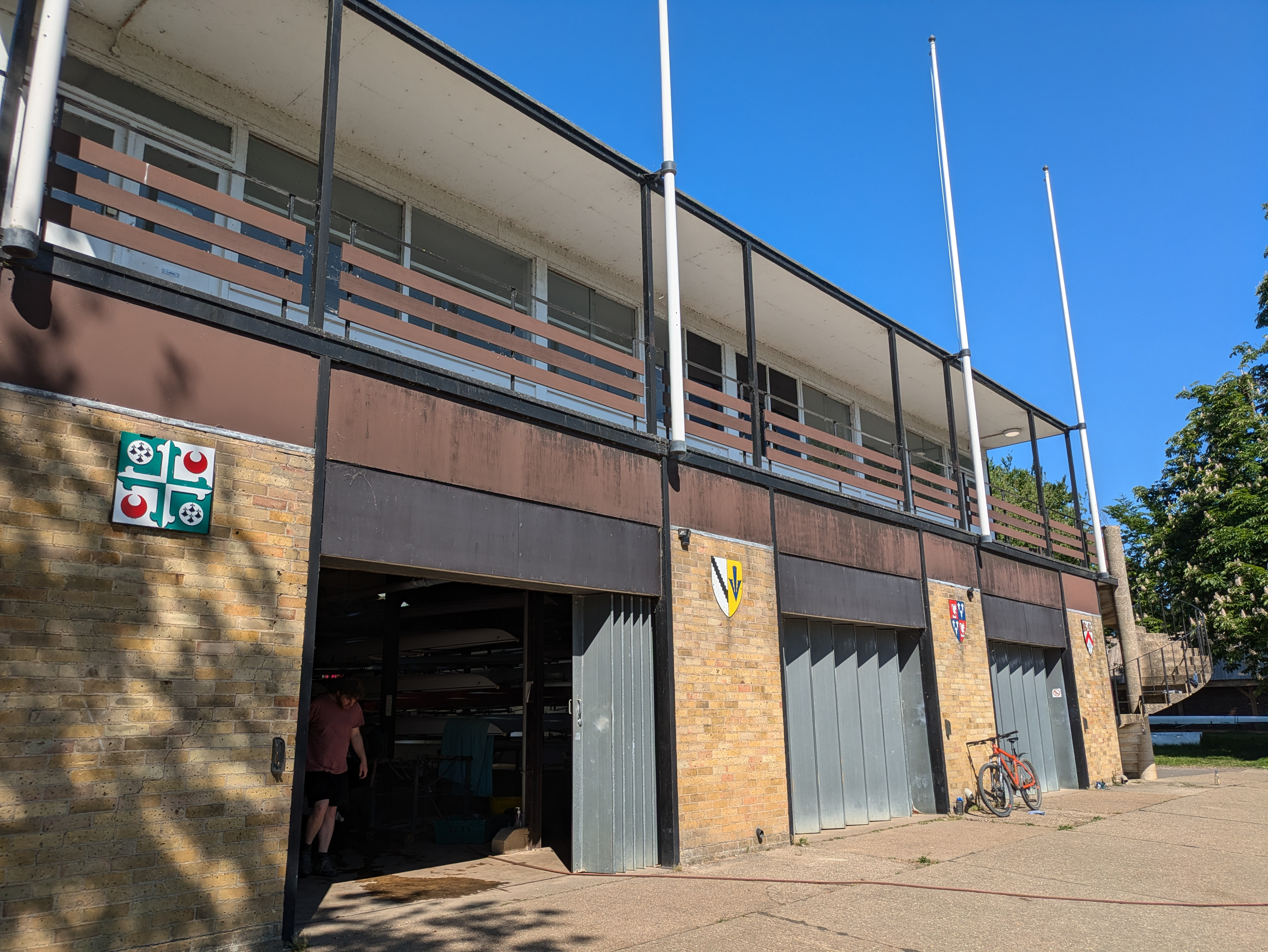
Old Combined Boathouse from the hard (May 2025)
