= Thomas Geldart =

Lawyer and academic (1797–1877)

Thomas Charles Geldart, LL.D (21 May 1797 – 17 September 1877) was a lawyer and academic in the nineteenth century.

Geldaret was born at Kirk Deighton and educated at Trinity Hall, Cambridge, graduating B.A. in 1818 and MA in 1821. He was Fellow of Trinity Hall from 1821 to 1836. He was called to the bar (Lincoln's Inn) in 1823. He was Master of Trinity Hall from 1852 until his death. He was Vice-Chancellor of the University of Cambridge from 1853 to 1854.
