= Lucasian Professor of Mathematics =

University of Cambridge professorship

The Lucasian Chair of Mathematics (/luːˈkeɪziən/) is a mathematics professorship in the University of Cambridge, England; its holder is known as the Lucasian professor. The post was founded in 1663 by Henry Lucas, who was Cambridge University's member of Parliament in 1639–1640, and it was officially established by King Charles II on 18 January 1664. It has been called the most celebrated professorship in the world, and the most famous academic chair in the world due to the prestige of many of its holders and the groundbreaking work done by them. It was said by The Daily Telegraph to be one of the most prestigious academic posts in the world. Since its establishment, the professorship has been held by, among others, Isaac Newton, Charles Babbage, George Stokes, Joseph Larmor, Paul Dirac and Stephen Hawking.

== History ==
Henry Lucas, in his will, bequeathed his library of 4,000 volumes to the university and left instructions for the purchase of land whose yielding should provide £100 a year for the founding of a professorship.

It is the third oldest chair of mathematics in Great Britain, after the Gresham Professor of Geometry at Gresham College and the Savilian Professor of Geometry at the University of Oxford.

In the 1800s and following decades, the Lucasian professors "played important roles in making Britain the preeminent scientific state and in changing the university from a ‘gentleman’s club’ to a research institution."

Babbage applied for the vacancy in 1826, after Turton, but Airy was appointed. William Whewell (who considered applying, but preferred both Herschel and Babbage to himself) remarked that he would be the best professor, but that the heads of the colleges would not see that. Nonetheless, Babbage was appointed when the chair became free again two years later.

The 19th and current Lucasian Professor is Michael Cates, starting from 1 July 2015.

Recently, the University of Cambridge requires holders of the chair to retire from the post at the age of 67, as was the case for Stephen Hawking.

== List of Lucasian professors ==
#	Year of appointment	Portrait	Name	Speciality	Tenure (years)
1	1663		Isaac Barrow (1630–1677)	Classics and mathematics	6
2	1669		Isaac Newton (1643–1727)	Mathematics and physics	33
3	1702		William Whiston (1667–1752)	Mathematics	9
4	1711		Nicholas Saunderson (1682–1739)	Mathematics	28
5	1739		John Colson (1680–1760)	Mathematics	21
6	1760		Edward Waring (1736–1798)	Mathematics	38
7	1798		Isaac Milner (1750–1820)	Mathematics and chemistry	22
8	1820		Robert Woodhouse (1773–1827)	Mathematics	2
9	1822		Thomas Turton (1780–1864)	Mathematics	4
10	1826		George Biddell Airy (1801–1892)	Astronomy	2
11	1828		Charles Babbage (1791–1871)	Mathematics and computing	11
12	1839		Joshua King (1798–1857)	Mathematics	10
13	1849		George Gabriel Stokes (1819–1903)	Physics and fluid mechanics	54
14	1903		Joseph Larmor (1857–1942)	Physics	29
15	1932		Paul Dirac (1902–1984)	Mathematical & theoretical physics	37
16	1969		James Lighthill (1924–1998)	Fluid mechanics	10
17	1979		Stephen Hawking (1942–2018)	Theoretical physics and cosmology	30
18	2009		Michael Green (born 1946)	String theory	6
19	2015		Michael Cates (born 1961)	Statistical mechanics of soft condensed matter	current

== Cultural references ==
In the final episode of the science-fiction television series Star Trek: The Next Generation, one of the main characters, the android Data, holds the Lucasian Chair in the late 24th century, albeit in an alternate reality.
