= Edward Shouldham =

English priest and academic

Edward Shouldham, DCL was an English priest and academic in the late 15th and early sixteenth centuries.

Shouldham was Rector of Therfield from 1485 and Master of Trinity Hall, Cambridge from 1502, holding both positions until his death in 1503.
