= John Wright (Master of Trinity Hall, Cambridge) =

English priest and academic

John Wright was an English priest and academic in the late 15th and early 16th centuries.

Wright graduated Bachelor of Canon Law in 1484. He was Master of Trinity Hall, Cambridge from 1505 until 1512. He held livings at Clothall and Layston. He died in 1519.
