= George Bramston =

George Bramston was a lawyer and academic in the late seventeenth and early eighteenth centuries.

Bramston was born in Great Baddow and educated at Trinity Hall, Cambridge, graduating LL.B in 1674 and LL.D in 1682. He was Fellow of Trinity-hall from 1692 to 1696, and its Master from 1703 until his death. He was Vice-Chancellor of the University of Cambridge from 1703 to 1704.

He died on 3 June 1710.
