= Walter Huke =

English priest and academic

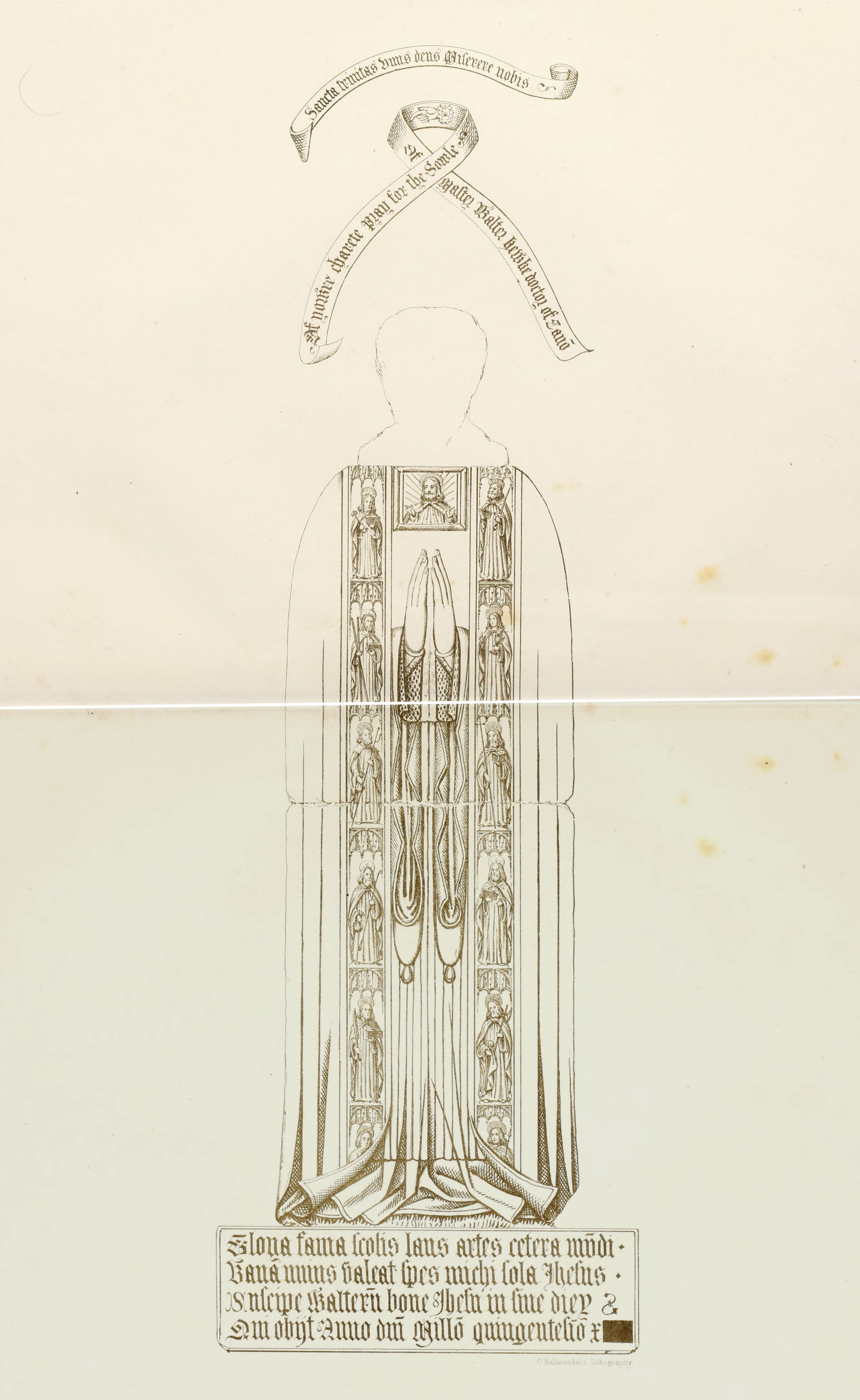
Memorial brass to Walter Huke in the chapel of Trinity Hall

Walter Huke or Hewke was an English priest and academic in the late 15th and early 16th centuries.

Huke graduated Bachelor of Canon Law in 1490. He was ordained in 1491. He was Rector of Holywell, Cambridgeshire (then in Huntingdonshire) from 1500 and Master of Trinity Hall, Cambridge from 1512, holding both posts until his death in 1517.
