= Simon Thornham =

English priest and academic

Simon Thornham, DCL was an English priest and academic in the 15th century.

Thornham was ordained in 1434. He was Master of Trinity Hall, Cambridge from 1453 to 1471. He held livings at Weston Longville, Swannington, Stokesby and Hingham.
