= De vera obedientia =

1535 treatise by Stephen Gardiner

De vera obedientia (About True Obedience) is a treatise written in 1535 by the Bishop of Winchester Stephen Gardiner in support of the annulment of Henry VIII of England's marriage to Katherine of Aragon. It stresses the obedience of the individual within a society's hierarchy as put in place by God: wives to husband, servants to masters, and subjects to their King.

According to Cardinal Reginald Pole, "Gardiner's book is written with the highest art, but... the arguments are weak."
