= Thomas Eden (politician) =

English jurist, academic and politician (died 1645)

Thomas Eden (died 18 July 1645) was an English jurist, academic and politician who sat in the House of Commons from 1640 to 1645.

== Background ==
Eden was the youngest son of Richard Eden of South Hanningfield, Essex and his wife Margaret Payton, daughter of Christopher Payton of Bury St. Edmunds, Suffolk, and was born in the south part of Sudbury within the county of Suffolk. From Sudbury school, he was sent to Pembroke Hall, Cambridge. He migrated to Trinity Hall, Cambridge, where he was admitted a scholar on 31 December 1596. He was elected to a fellowship 10 July 1599, and afterwards he held the office of reader of civil law in his college for many years. On 10 November 1613, being then LL.B., he was chosen to succeed Clement Corbet as Professor of Law at Gresham College, London. In March 1615, he held a disputation for the degree of LL.D. before James I at Cambridge, which earned great applause. He was created doctor in the following year. On 4 November 1615, he was admitted a member of the College of Advocates at Doctors' Commons.

Eden was elected Member of Parliament (MP) for Cambridge University in 1626. On 4 September 1626, he was chosen master of Trinity Hall on the resignation of Dr. Corbet. He was re-elected MP for Cambridge University in 1628 and sat until 1629 when King Charles decided to rule without parliament for eleven years. He was appointed chancellor of the diocese of Ely in 1630 and he was also commissary of Westminster, Bury St. Edmunds, and Sudbury, and one of the masters in chancery.

In April 1640, Eden was re-elected MP for Cambridge in the Short Parliament. He resigned his professorship at Gresham College on 27 July 1640. In November 1640, he was re-elected MP for Cambridge University for the Long parliament. On 3 May 1641, he joined with those members of the House of Commons who took the Protestation. The speaker informed the house on 7 Sept. 1642 that he had received commission from Dr. Eden and that he was also willing to lend £200 for the service of the king and parliament according to the propositions, to add to previous loans. On 28 February 1644, he took the Solemn League and Covenant. In April 1645, he was one of the committee of parliament, consisting of six peers and twelve commoners, which was appointed by the two houses to manage the affairs of the admiralty.

Eden died in London on 18 July 1645, and was buried on 2 August in the chapel of Trinity Hall, Cambridge, where a mural monument with a Latin inscription was erected to his memory. A Latin oration was delivered at his funeral by Thomas Exton.

Eden, who was highly commended as an advocate by Thomas Fuller, was a munificent benefactor to Trinity Hall.

== Foundation of the Eden Scholarship ==
After his death in 1645, the Eden Scholarship was founded to support the studies of undergraduates at Trinity Hall. This has continued to the present, with students taking First Class Honours being rewarded with a scholarship.

== Notes ==
Academic offices
Preceded by Clement Corbet	Master of Trinity Hall, Cambridge; 1626–1645	Succeeded by Robert King
Parliament of England
Preceded by Sir Robert Naunton; Sir Albert Morton	Member of Parliament for Cambridge University; 1626–1629; With: Sir John Coke	Parliament suspended until 1640
Parliament suspended since 1629	Member of Parliament for Cambridge University; 1640–1644; With: Henry Lucas	Succeeded by Henry Lucas; Nathaniel Bacon
