= Henry Bond (barrister) =

Henry Bond (19 September 1853 – 6 June 1938) was a British barrister and legal academic.

Bond was born in Cambridge and educated at Amersham Hall School, University College, London and Trinity Hall, Cambridge, where he spent the rest of his career. He was Scholar in 1875; Chancellor's Medallist in 1877; Called to the Bar in 1883; appointed Lecturer in Roman Law in 1886; elected Fellow in 1887; and J.P. in 1906. He was Master of Trinity Hall, Cambridge from 1919 to 1929; and a Bencher of the Middle Temple from 1922.

Bond's pupils included Jan Smuts, Prime Minister of South Africa, and Stanley Bruce, Prime Minister of Australia.

Bond lived at Middlefield, a country house near Stapleford to the south of Cambridge that was built for him in 1908−09 by the architect Edwin Lutyens. He died in Cambridge.

Academic offices
Preceded by Edward Anthony Beck	Master of Trinity Hall, Cambridge; 1919 to 1929	Succeeded by Henry Roy Dean
