= Clement Corbet =

English jurist (c.1576–1652)

Clement Corbet (c. 1576 – 1652) was an English jurist.

== Life ==
He was the sixth son of Sir Miles Corbet of Sprowston, Norfolk, who was high sheriff of that county in 1591, by Katherine, daughter of Sir Christopher Heydon. He was admitted a scholar of Trinity Hall, Cambridge, on 7 December 1592, took the degree of LL.B. in 1598, was elected a fellow of his college on 10 December the same year, and was created LL.D. in 1605.

In May 1607 he was chosen Professor of Law at Gresham College, London, and he occupied that chair till November 1613. On the death of John Cowell he was elected to succeed him in the mastership of Trinity Hall, on 12 October 1611, being at that time chancellor of the diocese of Chichester. On 9 May 1612 he was admitted a member of the College of Advocates at Doctors' Commons.

He was vice-chancellor of Cambridge in 1613-14. In 1626 he was appointed vicar-general and principal official to Samuel Harsnett the bishop of Norwich, and the following year he resigned the mastership of Trinity Hall.

== Death ==
He died on 28 May 1652, and was buried in the chancel of Belaugh church, Norfolk, where a monument, with a Latin inscription, was erected to his memory. By his wife Elizabeth Kemp, he had one son, Samuel, and five daughters. The portrait of him which was kept in the Master's Lodge at Trinity Hall was a bequest from Thomas Baker.

== Notes ==
Academic offices
Preceded by John Cowell	Master of Trinity Hall, Cambridge; 1611–1626	Succeeded by Thomas Eden
Preceded by Valentine Cary	Vice-Chancellor of the University of Cambridge; 1613–1614	Succeeded by Samuel Harsnett
