= Simon Dalling =

English priest and academic

Simon Dalling was an English priest and academic in the 15th century.

A Fellow of Trinity Hall, Cambridge, he was ordained in 1422. He became Rector of Warham, Norfolk. Dalling was Master of Trinity Hall, Cambridge from 1433 to 1453.
