= John Bond (jurist) =

English jurist and Puritan clergyman

John Bond LL.D. (1612–1676) was an English jurist, Puritan clergyman, member of the Westminster Assembly, and Master of Trinity Hall, Cambridge.

== Life ==
He was born at Chard, in Somerset; his father was Denis Bond. He was educated at Dorchester under John White, and afterwards entered at St. Catharine's College, Cambridge, of which he became a fellow. He took his B.A. degree in 1631, became M.A. in 1635, and LL.D. ten years later. In 1643 he became a member of the Westminster Assembly, and in December 1645 succeeded to the mastership of the Savoy.

In the same year, John Selden having declined the mastership of Trinity Hall, Dr. Robert King was chosen by the Fellows: but, Parliament interposing on behalf of Bond, he was elected Master on 7 March 1646. Three years later he was made Professor of Law at Gresham College, London, and in 1654 became assistant to the commissioners of Middlesex and Westminster for ejecting scandalous ministers and schoolmasters. He was appointed vice-chancellor of Cambridge University in 1658, but lost his preferments at Cambridge and London on the Restoration of 1660.

He retired to Dorset, where he died at Sandwich (Swanage), in the Isle of Purbeck, and was buried at Steeple on 30 July 1676. He is thought by some to be identical with the John Bond who was member for Melcombe Regis in the last parliament of Charles I, recorder of Weymouth and Melcombe Regis in 1645 and subsequently a recruiter in that district for the Long Parliament.

== Works ==
He published the following sermons:

- A Door of Hope, 1641.
- Holy and Royal Activity, 1641.
- Sermon at Exeter before the Deputy Lieutenants, 1643.
- Salvation in a Mystery, 1644.
- Ortus Occidentalis, 1645.
- A Reliquary of Gospel, 1647.
- Grapes amongst Thorns, 1648.
- A Thanksgiving Sermon, 1648.

== Notes ==
Academic offices
Preceded by Robert King	Master of Trinity Hall, Cambridge; 1646–1660	Succeeded by Robert King
Preceded by John Worthington	Vice-Chancellor of the University of Cambridge; 1658–1659	Succeeded by William Dillingham
