= William Mowse =

English lawyer (??–1588)

William Mowse (Mouse, Mosse) (died 12 August 1588) was an English lawyer and Master of Trinity Hall, Cambridge.

== Life ==
He graduated LL.B. at Cambridge in 1538, took holy orders, and in 1552 obtained an LL.D. In the latter year, through the interest of Thomas Cranmer and William Cecil, he obtained the mastership of Trinity Hall on the removal of Walter Haddon. On the accession of Mary on 6 July 1553, he took an active part in ousting Edwin Sandys from the vice-chancellorship, but was himself ousted from Trinity Hall to make way for the reinstatement of Stephen Gardiner. The same year, he was incorporated at Oxford and appointed regius professor of civil law in the following year.

In July 1555, he subscribed the Marian articles of religion, and on Gardiner's death, 12 November, the mastership of Trinity Hall was restored to him. By Cardinal Pole in 1556, he was appointed advocate of the court of Canterbury, and on 7 November 1557 he was admitted a member of the College of Advocates. On 12 December 1558 he was instituted to the rectory of Norton or Greensnorton, Northamptonshire. Though deprived of the Oxford chair and of the mastership of Trinity Hall soon after the accession of Elizabeth I, Mowse was in 1559 constituted vicar-general and official of the Archbishop of Canterbury, dean of the arches, and judge of the court of audience. In 1560, he was instituted to the rectory of East Dereham, Norfolk. In 1564, he sat on a commission, appointed 27 April, to try admiralty causes arising from depredations alleged to have been committed by English privateers on Spanish commerce. He died in 1588. By his will, dated 30 May 1586, he was a liberal donor to Trinity Hall.

Mowse was an able lawyer and a scholar, on friendly terms with Sir John Cheke. thought worthy of his friendship. He assisted in the compilation of John Lesley's Defence of the Queen of Scots.

Academic offices
Preceded by Walter Haddon	Master of Trinity Hall, Cambridge; 1552–1553	Succeeded by Stephen Gardiner
Preceded by Stephen Gardiner	Master of Trinity Hall, Cambridge; 1555–1559	Succeeded by Henry Harvey
