= Thomas Preston (writer) =

English Master of Trinity Hall, Cambridge (1537–1598)

- Born: 1537; Simpson, Buckinghamshire, England
- Died: 1 June 1598 (aged 60–61); Cambridge, Cambridgeshire, England

Thomas Preston (1537–1598) was an English master of Trinity Hall, Cambridge, and possibly a dramatist.

== Life ==
Preston was born at Simpson, Buckinghamshire, in 1537, and was educated at Eton and at King's College, Cambridge, where he was elected scholar, 16 August 1553, and fellow, 18 September 1556. He graduated B.A. in 1557 and M.A. in 1561. When Queen Elizabeth I visited Cambridge in August 1564, he attracted the royal favour by his performance of a part in the tragedy of Dido, and by disputing in philosophy with Thomas Cartwright in the royal presence. He also addressed the queen in a Latin oration on her departure, when she invited him to kiss her hand, and gave him a pension of 20l. a year, with the title of "her scholar." He served as proctor in the university in 1565. In 1572 he was directed by the authorities of his college to study civil law, and four years later proceeded to the degree of LL.D. In 1581 he resigned his fellowship. He seems to have joined the College of Advocates. In 1584 he was appointed master of Trinity Hall, and he served as vice-chancellor of the university in 1589–90.

Preston died on 1 June 1598, and was buried in the chapel of Trinity Hall. A monumental brass near the altar, placed there by his wife Alice, bears a Latin inscription and a full-length effigy of him in the habit of a Cambridge doctor of laws.

== Works ==
=== Cambyses ===
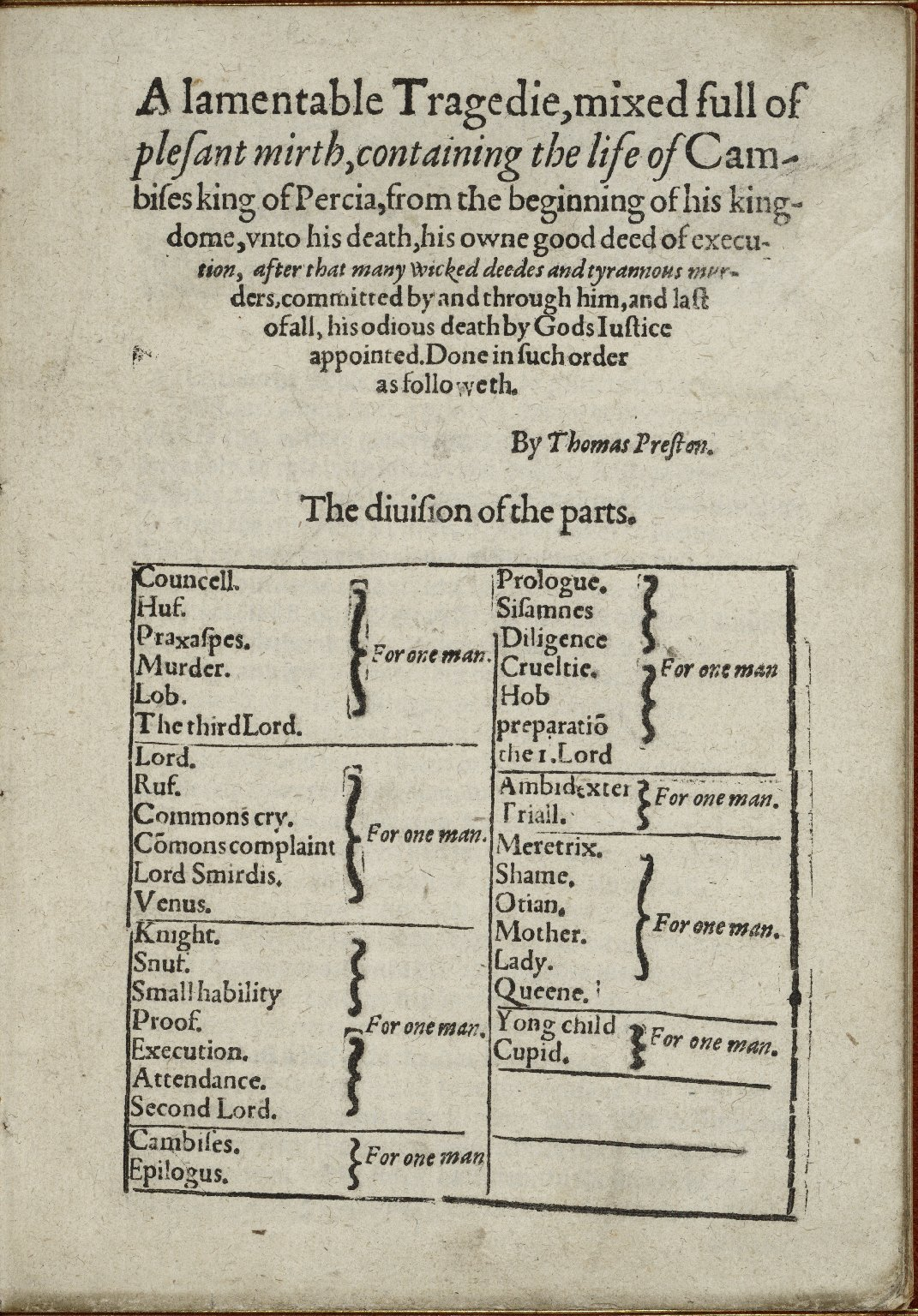
Title page of an early edition of Cambyses, showing the division of roles among actors.

Preston was a pioneer of the English drama, and published in 1569 A lamentable tragedy mixed ful of pleaſant mirth, conteyning the life of CAMBISES King of PERCIA, from the beginning of his kingdome vnto his death, his one good deed of execution, after that many wicked deeds and tirannous murders, committed by and through him, and laſt of all, his odious death by Gods Juſtice appointed, Doon in ſuch order as foloweth. By Thomas Preston. There are two undated editions: one by John Allde, who obtained a license for its publication in 1569, and another by Edward Allde. It was reprinted in Hawkins's Origin of the English Drama (i. 143) and in Dodsley's Old English Drama (ed. Hazlitt, iv. 157 sq.). A reference to the death of Bishop Bonner in September 1569 shows that the piece was produced after that date.

The play illustrates the transition from the morality play to historical drama. The dramatis personae include allegorical figures (e.g. Cruelty, Small Ability) as well as historical personages (such as the title character, Cambyses II). The plot, characterisation, and language are rugged and uncouth. Murder and bloodshed abound. The play is largely written in rhyming fourteener couplets, with some irregular heroic verse (as in the speeches of the comic character Ambidexter). The bombastic grandiloquence of the piece became proverbial, and Shakespeare is believed to allude to it when he makes Falstaff say "I must speak in passion, and I will do it in King Cambyses' vein" (Henry IV, Part 1, ii.4).

==== Preston's authorship ====
Critics objecting to the style of Cambyses have doubted whether the playwright may not have been a different Thomas Preston. M. Channing Linthicum lists some of these possibilities:

Those who dislike to think of Cambyses as even a puerile attempt of the Latin scholar Thomas Preston, may entertain Chambers' suggestion that it may have been composed by a popular writer of the same name. He mentions, (Elizabethan Stage, III, 469), a "quarterly waiter at Court" under Edward VI, and a choirmaster at Windsor. A "gentleman waiter" of this name was detailed to the service of the Princess of Castile in 1514 (see Letters & Papers of Henry VIII, I, ii, entry 2656 [6]); a Thomas Preston was rewarded by Princess Mary Tudor, 1537 (see Madden, Privy Purse Expenses of Princess Mary, 59); in 1544, Thomas Preston—presumably the same person—was granted, as the King's "servant" a tenement "called le Crystofer in St Botulphs parishe without Aldrychgate" (see Letters & Papers of Henry VIII, XIX, i, p. 644); "le messuage called le White Beare" was said in 1548, to have been "lately in tenure of Thomas Preston" (see Cal. Pat. Rolls, July 25, 1548, m. 34). None of these—if they were different persons—is termed writer or "player," but the references show that the name was not uncommon in London, and the subject needs to be investigated.

On the other hand, Émile Legouis has noted, "The marked and yet artless bad taste of the style has thrown doubt on the authorship, yet the play shows signs of having been written by a humanist, for Herodotus is followed step by step, and there are many mythological reminiscences." But it has since been argued that the Herodotean account may have been mediated by a chronicle such as Johann Carion's Chronica; a more recent refinement of this theory suggests that Preston used Richard Taverner's 1539 The Garden of Wysedom, which drew on Carion.

=== Ballads ===
Preston (or the author of Cambyses) also wrote a broadside ballad entitled A Lamentation from Rome how the Pope doth bewayle the Rebelles in England cannot prevayle. To the tune of "Rowe well, ye mariners" (London by William Griffith, 1570; reprinted in Collier's Old Ballads, edited for the Percy Society, and in the Borderer's Table Book by Moses Aaron Richardson, vii. 154). This ballad is written "in the person of a fly who happens to be lodged in the pope's nose when news comes about the Catholic uprising in the north of England" and describes the pope raging and hurling furniture, to the fly's terror. Another ballad, titled A Ballad from the Countrie, sent to showe how we should Fast this Lente is extant and dated 1589. Both the surviving ballads, as well as Cambyses, are subscribed at the end "Quod Thomas Preston".

A third ballad by Preston, not now extant, A geliflower of swete marygolde, wherein the frutes of tyranny you may beholde, was licensed for publication to William Griffith, 1569–70.

=== Latin works ===
Besides the orations connected to the queen's 1564 Cambridge visit, Preston contributed Latin verses to the university collection on the restitution of Martin Bucer and Paul Fagius (1560), and to Nicholas Carr's Latin translation of seven orations of Demosthenes (London, 1571).

== Editions of Cambyses ==
- Craik, T.W. (1974) Minor Elizabethan tragedies, new ed. London. Dent.
- Creeth, E. (1966) Tudor plays: an anthology of early English drama. Garden City. Anchor/Doubleday.
- Fraser, R.A. and Rabkin, N.C. (1976) Drama of the English Renaissance, vol. 1. New York. Macmillan.
- Johnson, R.C. (1975) A critical edition of Thomas Preston's Cambises. Salzburg. Institut für Englische Sprache und Literatur, Universität Salzburg.

Academic offices
Preceded by Henry Harvey	Master of Trinity Hall, Cambridge; 1585–1598	Succeeded by John Cowell
