= Henry Harvey (lawyer) =

English lawyer

Henry Harvey LL.D. (died 1585) was an English lawyer, who became Master of Trinity Hall, Cambridge, and established the London premises (for two centuries) of Doctors' Commons, leased from the college. He also became Vice-Chancellor of the University of Cambridge.

== Life ==
He was son of Robert Harvey of Stradbroke, Suffolk. and Joan, his wife. He was educated at Trinity Hall, where he took the degree of LL.B. in 1538, and became LL.D. in 1542.

On 27 January 1550 he was admitted an advocate at Doctors' Commons. He gained a reputation as an ecclesiastical lawyer, and was appointed vicar-general of his diocese by Nicholas Ridley, Bishop of London; and subsequently he was vicar-general of the province of Canterbury. Under Queen Mary he was actively engaged in proceedings against heretics. During the reign of Elizabeth I, he assisted the Commissioners of 1570, engaged in drawing up statutes primarily intended as a check on Puritanism.

In 1567 Harvey procured a lease of the premises in London which, as Doctor's Commons, became the central stronghold of ecclesiastical lawyers. Trinity Hall had control of the buildings and chambers; and these rights, though rendered terminable in 1728, were not abandoned until the incorporation of Doctor's Commons in 1768.

== Notes ==
Attribution

This article incorporates text from a publication now in the public domain: Venables, Edmund (1891). "Harvey, Henry (d.1585)". In Stephen, Leslie; Lee, Sidney (eds.). Dictionary of National Biography. Vol. 25. London: Smith, Elder & Co. pp. 87–88.

Academic offices
Preceded by William Mowse	Master of Trinity Hall, Cambridge; 1559–1585	Succeeded by Thomas Preston
Preceded by Andrew Perne	Vice-Chancellor of the University of Cambridge; 1560–1561	Succeeded by Philip Baker
