= Thomas Larke =

English priest and academic

Thomas Larke, DCL was an English priest and academic in the 15th and early 16th centuries.

Larke held livings at Morborne and Kettering. Larke was Master of Trinity Hall, Cambridge from 1517 to 1525. He was Archdeacon of Sudbury from 1517 to 1522; and Archdeacon of Norwich from 1522 to 1528.
