= John Cowell (jurist) =

English jurist (1554–1611)

John Cowell (1554 – 11 October 1611) was an English jurist.

== Life ==
Born at Ernesborough (now Irishborough), in the parish of Swimbridge in North Devon. He was a chorister in the Choir of King's College, Cambridge and was then educated at Eton College before returning as a scholar at King's College, Cambridge, where he was elected a fellow. In 1594 he became Regius Professor of Civil Law at Cambridge, and in 1598 master of Trinity Hall, Cambridge.

He died at Oxford on 11 October 1611, soon after being released from prison, and was buried in Trinity Hall Chapel, Cambridge.

== Works ==
In 1607, he compiled a law dictionary, The Interpreter, in which he exalted the king's prerogative; he was prosecuted before the House of Commons by Sir Edward Coke, who had a hostile history with Cowell. He was saved from imprisonment only by the interposition of James I. His book was burnt by order of the House of Commons. The suppression order read in part:

When Men goe out of their Element, and meddle with Things above their Capacitie, themselves shall not onely goe astray and stumble in Darknesse, but will mislead also divers others with themselves into many Mistakings and Errours.. the Proofe whereof wee have lately had by a Booke written by Docteur Cowell.. by medling in Matters above his reach, he hath fallen in many Things to mistake and deceive himselfe.. in some Poynts very derogatory to the supreme Power of this Crowne; In other Cases mistaking the true State of the Parliament of this Kingdome...

Many copies survived the burning and have been reprinted. A copy of the 1607 printing can be found at the Lilly Library in Bloomington, Indiana.

"The Interpreter" was one of the first law dictionaries.

Cowell also wrote a work entitled Institutiones Juris Anglicani. The book has been described as an English version in the Justinian style. It also hints a correlation of Scottish and English law.

== Notes ==
Academic offices
Preceded by Thomas Preston	Master of Trinity Hall, Cambridge; 1598–1611	Succeeded by Clement Corbet
