= William Millington =

Australian fighter pilot and flying ace (1917–1940)

William Henry Millington
- Born: 11 August 1917; Newcastle-upon-Tyne, England
- Died: 30 October 1940 (aged 23) over the English Channel
- Military career
- Allegiance: Australia
- Branch: Royal Air Force
- Service years: 1939–1940 †
- Rank: Pilot officer
- Units: No. 79 Squadron; No. 249 Squadron
- Conflicts: Second World War; Battle of Britain
- Awards: Distinguished Flying Cross

William Henry Millington (11 August 1917 – 30 October 1940) was an Australian fighter pilot and flying ace who flew in the Royal Air Force (RAF) during the Second World War. He was credited with at least nine aerial victories.

Born in Newcastle-upon-Tyne in England, Millington was raised in Australia. He joined the RAF in 1939 and the following year was posted to No. 79 Squadron. Flying a Hawker Hurricane fighter, he flew extensively during the Battle of Britain, scoring a number of aerial victories. He was also shot down on one occasion, steering his burning Hurricane away from a populated area before crash landing the aircraft. Later posted to No. 249 Squadron, he was presumed to have been killed in a dogfight over the English Channel just before the end of the Battle of Britain.

== Early life ==
William Henry Millington was born on 11 August 1917 in Newcastle-upon-Tyne in England to William Henry and Elizabeth Hay Millington. His family emigrated to Australia while Millington was a child and settled in Edwardstown in the state of South Australia. In June 1939, he returned to England to take up a short-service commission in the Royal Air Force (RAF). This was granted on 18 September 1939, Millington becoming an acting pilot officer on probation.

== Second World War ==
Millington proceeded to No. 6 Operational Training Unit at Sutton Bridge for familiarisation on the Hawker Hurricane fighter in early June 1940, once his flight training had been completed. By this time, he had been promoted to the rank of pilot officer although remained on probation. Later in the month he was posted to No. 79 Squadron.

=== Battle of Britain ===
At the time Millington joined No. 79 Squadron, which operated Hurricanes, it was based at Biggin Hill as part of No. 11 Group, having been heavily engaged in operations in France. It helped provide aerial protection for convoys making their way along the southern coastline of England, and on 9 July, Millington shot down a Messerschmitt Bf 109 fighter to the east of Dover. Later in the month his probationary period ended as he was confirmed in his pilot officer rank. By this stage of the battle, No. 79 Squadron had shifted north to Acklington, as part of No. 13 Group.

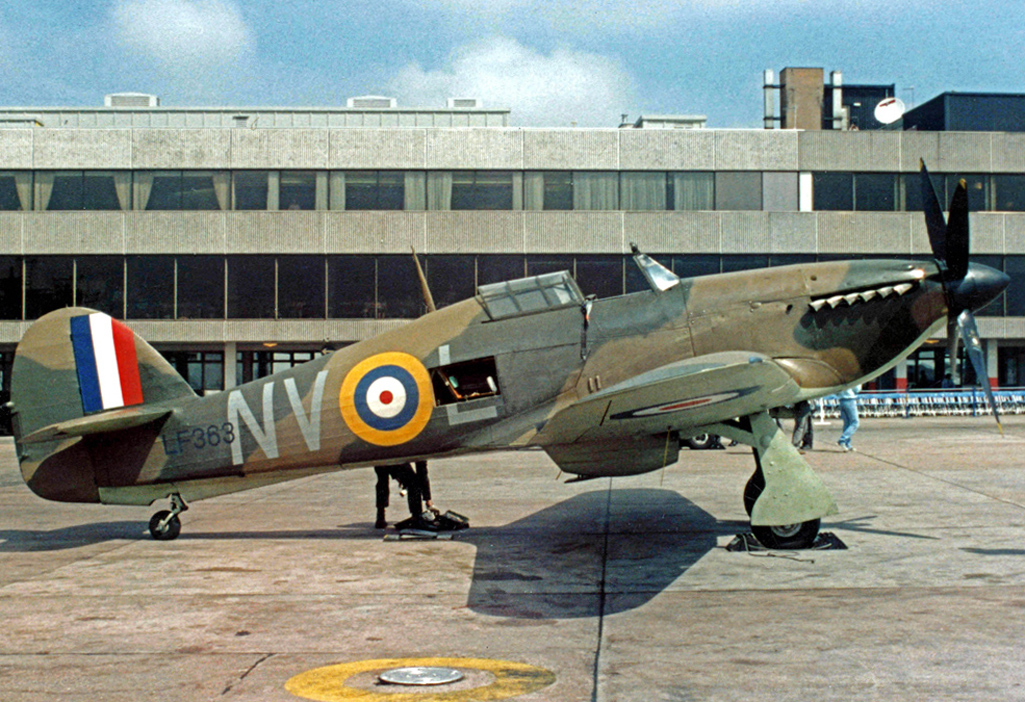
A Hawker Hurricane in the markings of No. 79 Squadron

On 15 August, the Luftwaffe mounted a bomber attack on the northern part of England, the area defended by No. 13 Group. No. 79 Squadron was scrambled to deal with the incoming bombers and Millington engaged and destroyed three Heinkel He 111 medium bombers off Middlesbrough. He shot down a He 111 on 30 August and was also credited with a second He 111 as probably destroyed. He also damaged a Messerschmitt Bf 110 heavy fighter. The following day he destroyed a Dornier Do 17 bomber and also shot down two Bf 109s and damaged a third. However, he was wounded and his Hurricane was set afire by cannon fire from a Bf 109. Rather than bale out, he stayed with the aircraft and crash-landed near Hawkhurst to ensure that it did not crash on a populated area. He was badly burned and hospitalised.

Millington was posted to No. 249 Squadron on 19 September once he recovered from his wounds and injuries. Based at North Weald and operating Hurricanes, his new unit was heavily engaged in the aerial fighting over London as the Luftwaffe intensified its operations against the city. On 27 September he shot down a Junkers Ju 88 medium bomber near Guildford and shared in the destruction of another in the same area. A few days later, and in recognition of his exploits with No. 79 Squadron, Millington was awarded the Distinguished Flying Cross (DFC). The citation, published in The London Gazette, for the DFC read:

In August, 1940, this officer was flying as a member of a section engaged on aerodrome guard patrol. Fifteen Dorniers escorted by a large number of Messerschmitts were sighted and an attack was ordered. Pilot Officer Millington succeeded in damaging a Dormer, but was in turn engaged by three Messerschmitts. He damaged one, shook off the other two and, single-handed, again engaged the bombers. During a further attack by two of the enemy fighters, he shot down one but a cannon shell burst in the engine of his aircraft causing it to burn. Pilot Officer Millington, although suffering from a wound, chose to make a crash landing rather than abandon his aircraft and so endanger a village in front of him. He succeeded in getting clear just before the petrol tanks exploded. A few days previously, he attacked a formation of about sixty Heinkels, two of which he destroyed. He has displayed great courage in attacking superior numbers of enemy aircraft.

— London Gazette, No. 34958, 1 October 1940

While flying north of Ashford on 7 October, Millington shot down a Bf 109; this was claimed as probably destroyed as was another a Bf 109 he engaged on 25 October near Hastings. Three days later he damaged a Do 17 near the RAF's base at Hawkinge and on a subsequent sortie the same day shared in the destruction a Ju 88 southeast of Dungeness. On 30 October, the penultimate day of the Battle of Britain, an incoming raid of about 100 aircraft was detected and No. 249 Squadron was scrambled to deal with it. Millington became engaged in a series of dogfights over the English Channel and was last seen in pursuit of a Bf 109 and never returned to base. He was presumed to have been killed, the last Australian fatality of the Battle of Britain. With no known grave, Millington is commemorated on the Runneymeade Memorial at Englefield Green. As an Australian who died while serving in the armed forces of the United Kingdom, his name is recorded in the Commemorative Roll at the Australian War Memorial in Canberra.

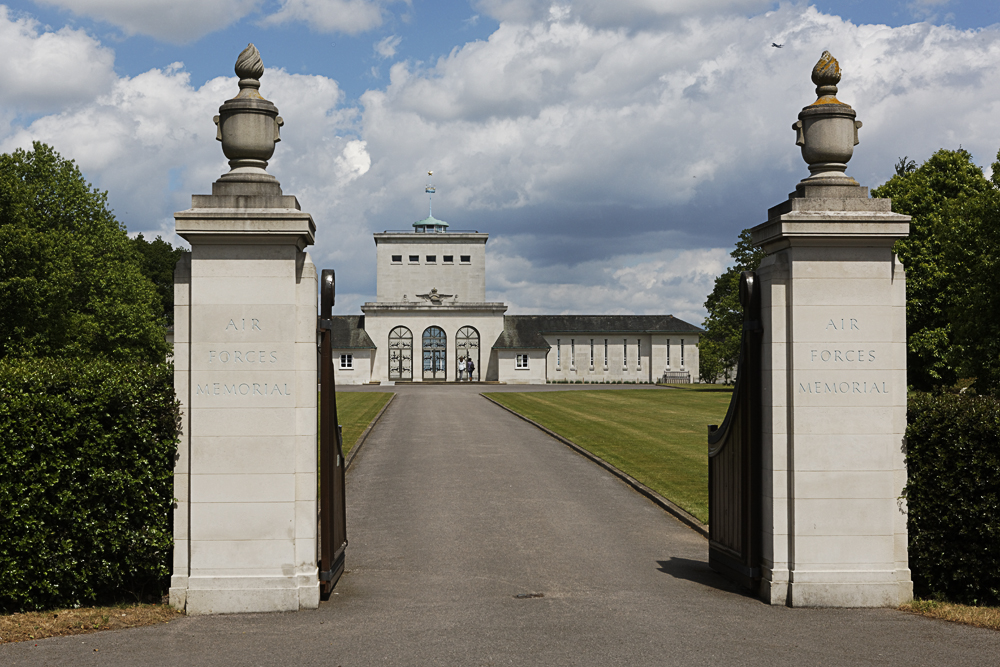
The Runneymeade Memorial at Englefield Green, where Millington is commemorated

Millington is credited with the destruction of nine German aircraft, with a share in two others shot down. He also probably destroyed another four aircraft and damaged three.
