= Genealogical roll =

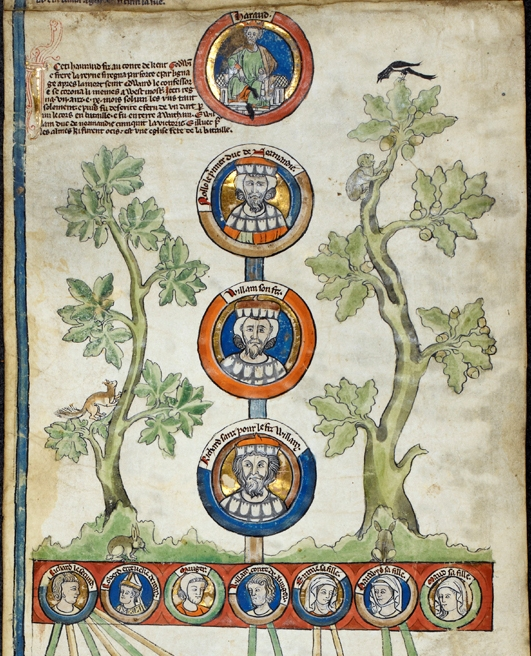
Genealogical roll recording the Norman ancestry of William the Conqueror. London, BL, Royal 14 B vi, ca. 1300-1307

A genealogical roll is a type of manuscript scroll, designed to illustrate genealogical information, particularly in a royal or noble family. Such rolls evolved in the second half of the thirteenth century in England, starting from a style of visual representation of a simplified family tree in works of Matthew Paris, where they supplemented the main text and were paginated. The type of representation in Paris, which had occasionally involved fold-outs for convenience, was transferred to scrolls of lengths that eventually reached over 40 feet (10 metres). More than 30 examples survive that relate to the English royal families. Genealogical rolls became very popular during the period of the Wars of the Roses, when they could show the dynastic claims at the centre of the conflict.
