= Robert King (jurist) =

English jurist

Robert King LL.D. (1600 – 6 November 1676) was an English jurist and Master of Trinity Hall, Cambridge.

== Life ==
He was a native of Kent. He matriculated as a pensioner of Christ's College, Cambridge, 5 July 1617, graduated B.A. in 1620–1, and proceeded M.A. in 1624. In 1625 he was elected to a fellowship at Trinity Hall, which he held till 1636.

On 16 June 1628 he was sworn and admitted a proctor in the Bishop of Ely's consistorial court by Dr. Thomas Eden. In 1636 he took the degree of LL.D., and on 10 October 1641 was admitted an advocate of the court of arches at Doctors' Commons. From 1641 to 1662 he was official to the Archdeacon of Suffolk, and from 1642 to 1646 commissary of the Suffolk archdeaconry. He was commissary of Sudbury archdeaconry for 1645 only, and official to the archdeacon of Sudbury, 1645 to 1674.

On the death of Thomas Eden (18 July 1645), Parliament (30 August) ordered the Fellows of Trinity Hall to suspend the election of any master until the university regulations had been carried out; but the fellows on 28 September petitioned for leave to elect in consequence of various inconveniences. Their prayer being granted, they elected John Selden (23 July), and upon his refusal to act King was chosen on 28 October and his election approved by the House of Lords on 6 November; but the Commons objecting, he was constrained to resign, and the fellows proceeded on 7 March 1646 to elect John Bond. This election received the approval of both houses on 26 March.

At the Restoration of 1660 King was re-elected and admitted to the mastership, 20 August 1660. In 1661 he was made vicar-general and principal official to Matthew Wren, Bishop of Ely, and on 30 June 1662 the bishop placed him at the head of a commission to visit the diocese. He retained his chancellorship of Ely under Benjamin Laney, and was one of the commissioners for visiting the diocese in 1674.

King died on 6 November 1676, aged 76, and was buried in the chapel of Trinity Hall. A black marble slab to his memory, with a Latin inscription and coat of arms, is placed near the altar. His arms also appear on a window in the Master's Lodge. King married Frances, daughter of Jasper Wareyn of Great Thurlow, Suffolk. By her he had a son and daughter, who both predeceased him. Land which he had purchased at Great Thurlow he left by will to three grandsons, Robert, Henry, and Thomas King.

== Notes ==
Academic offices
Preceded by Thomas Eden	Master of Trinity Hall, Cambridge; 1645–1646	Succeeded by John Bond
Preceded by John Bond	Master of Trinity Hall, Cambridge; 1660–1676	Succeeded by Thomas Exton
