= Henry Latham =

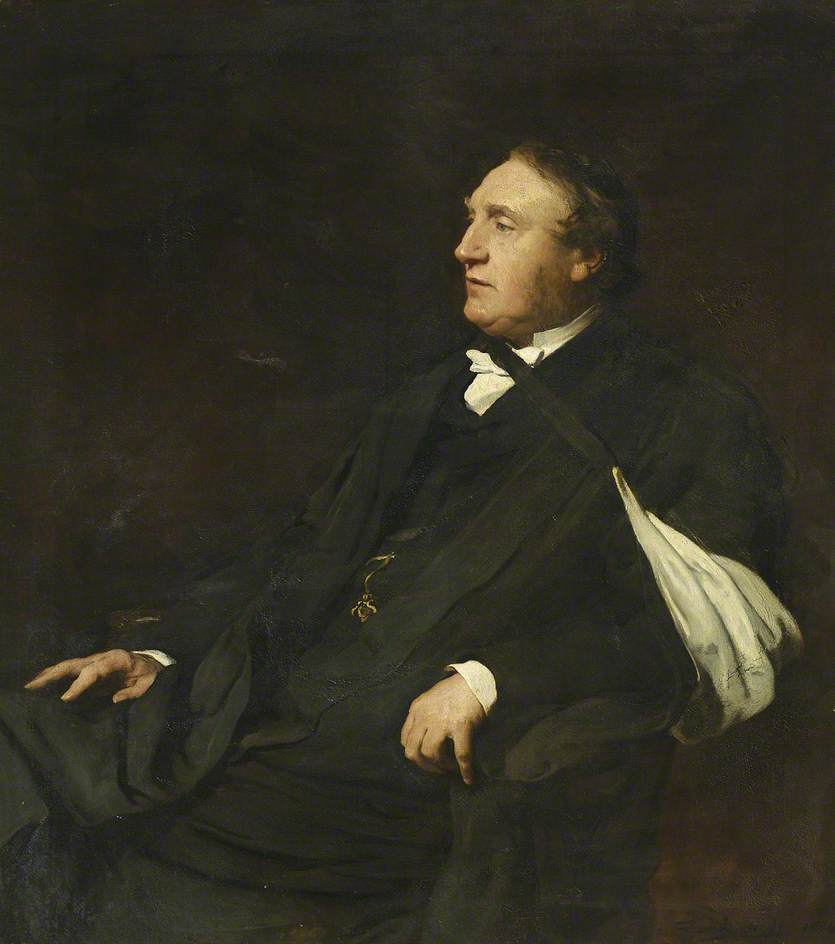
Portrait by Frank Holl

Henry Latham (b Dover 29 June 1821 - d Cambridge 5 June 1902) was a priest and academic in the second half of the 19th century and first decade of the 20th.

Latham spent his undergraduate years at Trinity College, Cambridge but then spent the rest of his career at Trinity Hall. He was ordained in 1848; was a Fellow from 1848 to 1888; and Master from 1888 until 1902.
