= Henry Wells (Master of Trinity Hall, Cambridge) =

English academic

Henry Wells was an English academic in the late 14th and early 15th centuries.

Wells was born in Upwell. He was Rector of Grimston, Norfolk from 1399 to 1406; and Archdeacon of Lincoln from 1405 to 1431. Wells was Master of Trinity Hall, Cambridge from 1413 until 1429.
