= Thomas Exton =

English admiralty lawyer and Member of Parliament

Sir Thomas Exton (1631–1688) was an English admiralty lawyer, Member of Parliament, and Master of Trinity Hall, Cambridge.

== Life ==
His father was the admiralty lawyer John Exton. He entered Merchant Taylors' School in 1641, was admitted a member of Gray's Inn in 1648, and went to Trinity Hall, Cambridge, where he proceeded LL.D. in 1662.

In 1676 he became Master of Trinity Hall, and held the office till his death. Previous to 1678 he was knighted and appointed one of the judges of the admiralty. He represented Cambridge University in the two parliaments of 1679, when he was described as advocate-general, in 1681, and 1685. He died in 1688, and was buried on 8 November at St. Peter's, Paul's Wharf.

== Works ==
The Case of the Merchants concerned in the Loss of the Ship Virgin, ... as it was ... presented to his Majesty by Sir R. Lloyd and Sir Thomas Exton, was printed in 1680.

Academic offices
Preceded by Robert King	Master of Trinity Hall, Cambridge; 1676–1688	Succeeded by George Oxenden
