= BNY Investments =

Global investment management firm

- Formerly: BNY Mellon Investment Management
- Company type: Subsidiary
- Industry: Investment management
- Predecessors: BNY Asset Management; Mellon Asset Management
- Founded: July 1, 2007; 18 years ago
- Headquarters: 240 Greenwich Street, Manhattan, New York, U.S.
- Key people: Hanneke Smits (CEO)
- Products: Mutual Funds; Money market funds ETFs
- AUM: US$2 Trillion (Dec 2023)
- Parent: BNY
- Subsidiaries: Dreyfus Corporation; Insight Investment; Newton Investment Management; Walter Scott
- Website: bny.com/investments

BNY Investments is the investment management division of BNY. It is one of the largest asset managers in the world.

BNY Investments operates a multi-boutique model where individual investment managers operate largely autonomously under it.

== Background ==
BNY Investments traces its origins to BNY Asset Management and Mellon Asset management which were the asset management divisions of Bank of New York and Mellon Financial respectively.

In July 2007, BNY Mellon was created from the merger of the Bank of New York and Mellon Financial and BNY Mellon Investment Management (BNY Mellon IM) was created as a result of merging BNY Asset Management and Mellon Asset management. At the time of the deal, Mellon Asset management was far larger of the two with $930 billion (around 85%) in assets under management while BNY Asset management only had $179 billion under management. Under Mellon Asset management were the units Dreyfus, Newton, Walter Scott, Boston Company Asset Management and Standish Mellon Asset Management. Under BNY Asset management were the units Ivy Asset Management, Alcentra and Urdang Capital Management. The deal favoured the executives from Mellon Asset management who obtained senior positions at the newly formed division including its CEO, Ronald O’Hanley who became BNY Mellon IM 's CEO. In contrast several senior executives from BNY Asset Management left shortly after the merger was complete.

After its establishment, BNY Mellon IM made moves to enter the emerging markets. In 2007, it acquired Brazilian asset management firm, ARX Capital Management in order enter the Brazilian market. During the same year it also entered a joint venture with Western Securities in China to enter its retail money management market. It was also looking at the Middle East to work with sovereign wealth funds such as Kuwait Investment Authority and the Abu Dhabi Investment Authority.

In 2009, BNY Mellon IM acquired Insight Investment from Lloyds Banking Group for £235m. In the same year BNY Mellon IM acquired a 20% stake in Siguler Guff.

In early 2010, BNY Mellon IM closed its fund of hedge funds, Ivy Asset Management. Client interest in it declined after 2006 due to its involvement with Amaranth Advisors which resulted in significant losses. At the same time, New York Attorney General Andrew Cuomo was investigating it due to its involvement in advising clients to invest with Bernie Madoff. In November 2012, Ivy Asset Management reached a $210 million settlement with US authorities for its involvement with Madoff.

In September 2017, BNY Mellon IM sold its real assets unit, CenterSquare Investment Management (previously Urdang Capital Management) to Lovell Minnick Partners.

In 2018, BNY Mellon IM merged three of its investment firms (Mellon Capital Management, Standish Mellon Asset Management and The Boston Company Asset Management) to form a new unit called Mellon Investments. Due to rising technology and research costs, such consolidation was done so costs could be shared.

In May 2022, Franklin Templeton Investments agreed to acquire the Alcentra private credit unit from BNY Mellon IM for $1 billion. GlobalCapital stated this was far less than the initial expectation and was perceived to happen due to the weakening of the unit's business in recent years. As a result, BNY Mellon IM lost value on the sale. The deal was completed in November 1, 2022.

In January 2023. BNY IM reported that its assets under management as of December 31 had declined 24.6% from a year earlier. It was attributed to lower market values, impact of a stronger US Dollar and the sale of Alcentra.

In June 2024, the division was rebranded to BNY Investments.
