= Dreyfus Corporation =

American investment manager of investment products and strategies

The Dreyfus Corporation
- Company type: Subsidiary
- Founded: 1951; New York, NY
- Headquarters: MetLife Building, New York, NY, USA
- Key people: J. Charles Cardona Jr. (President), Richard Hoey (Chief Economist)
- Products: Mutual Funds, Separate Accounts, Annuities, Individual Retirement Accounts and Brokerage Services
- Parent: BNY Investments

Dreyfus is an American investment management company that deals with investment products and strategies. It was established in 1951 and is currently headquartered in New York City.

Dreyfus currently is a subsidiary of BNY Investments.

== History ==
The firm's origin dates back to 1947, when investor Jack Dreyfus founded a brokerage house in New York City named Dreyfus & Co.

In 1951, attracted by the concept of mutual funds, Dreyfus & Co. purchased a small management company named John G. Nesbett & Co., Inc. with a small common stock fund called The Nesbett Fund Incorporated. Nesbett & Co. was renamed The Dreyfus Corporation, and The Nesbett Fund became The Dreyfus Fund Incorporated.

Going public in 1965, Dreyfus was among the first money management firms to tap into the stock market for additional capital.

In 1976, Dreyfus was among the first fund companies to introduce an incorporated tax-exempt municipal bond fund.

In 1994, Dreyfus completed its landmark merger with Mellon Bank Corporation, and became a wholly owned subsidiary of Mellon Financial Corporation. The merger, a milestone in the history of financial services in the United States, was at the time the largest-ever combination of a bank and mutual fund company.

On July 1, 2007, The Bank of New York Company, Inc. and Mellon Financial Corporation merged to form a new company BNY, one of the world's largest global asset management and securities services companies. The reach of Dreyfus' distribution capabilities now extends to the resources of BNY and its exclusive network of institutional asset managers.

== Current operations ==
As a BNY company, Dreyfus provides equity, fixed income, global/international and money market mutual funds, separately managed accounts, retirement and cash management strategies, asset allocation and brokerage services. Dreyfus products are delivered through a variety of distribution channels: intermediary (advisor-sold), institutional, and retail direct.
