= Insight Investment =

British asset management company

- Industry: Investment management
- Founded: 2002; 24 years ago
- Headquarters: London, United Kingdom
- Area served: Worldwide
- Key people: Raman Srivastava; CEO
- Products: Investment management
- AUM: $839.3bn (30 September 2026)
- Parent: BNY; BNY Investments
- Website: www.insightinvestment.com

Insight Investment, also referred to simply as Insight, is a British asset management company. It is one of the largest global asset management companies, responsible for $839.3bn of assets under management as of 30 September 2026, represented by the value of cash securities and other economic exposure managed for clients. It manages strategies which include fixed income, liability-driven investment (LDI), cash, absolute return and multi-asset. Insight is a subsidiary of BNY, a multinational financial services corporation. Insight is the largest LDI manager in the world, as measured by assets under management.

The UK banking group HBOS formed Insight Investment in 2002 by merging its asset management arms, which included Clerical Medical Investment Management. In 2003, Insight Investment acquired Rothschild Asset Management, which specialised in fixed income investments. In 2009, BNY acquired Insight from Lloyds Banking Group, which formally acquired HBOS earlier that year. In 2013, Insight merged with Pareto Investment Management, a currency risk manager. In early 2015, BNY acquired US-based fixed income and solutions specialist Cutwater Asset Management. In 2021, various fixed income capabilities transferred from Mellon Investments to Insight. Insight is headquartered in London and has offices in Manchester, New York, Boston, San Francisco, Frankfurt, Sydney and Tokyo.

Insight Investment was a founding signatory of the United Nations-supported Principles for Responsible Investment (PRI). Insight is a signatory to the UK Stewardship Code, administered by the Financial Reporting Council. Insight is also a signatory to the UN Global Compact.

== History ==
Insight Investment was launched in 2002. It was formed from the merger of the asset management arms of UK banking group HBOS: Clerical Medical Investment Management, Halifax Fund Management and the investment division of Equitable Life. Douglas Ferrans was Insight's first CEO and played a significant role in its formation and launch.

In 2003, Insight acquired Rothschild Asset Management, which was well known for its fixed income solutions and multimanager funds, and property investment manager Gatehouse Investment Management.

In 2006, Insight demerged its property investment unit and floated it on the Aim market at the London Stock Exchange as Invista Real Estate Investment Management.

In 2007, Abdallah Nauphal became CEO of Insight. He already held a dual role as deputy CEO (from June 2006) and chief investment officer (from September 2003) of the company. He joined Insight as head of fixed income in April 2003 after the acquisition of Rothschild Asset Management, where he was chief investment officer for fixed income. He was previously head of fixed income at Schroder Investment Management.

In 2009, Insight's parent company HBOS was acquired by Lloyds Banking Group (Lloyds). Later that year, BNY acquired Insight Investment from Lloyds. Lloyds retained most of the equity assets managed by Insight and transferred them to Scottish Widows Investment Partnership, the group's primary in-house asset manager after the sale of Insight. This left Insight as an asset manager primarily focused on fixed income and LDI strategies. It transferred its headquarters in early 2011 to share a building with BNY in Blackfriars, London.

In 2012, Insight announced that it would merge with Pareto Investment Management, a currency risk manager with £27 billion of assets under management. The merger was complete at the beginning of 2013. Pareto was also owned by BNY.

In early 2015, BNY acquired US-based fixed income and solutions specialist Cutwater Asset Management.

In 2021, BNY Investments in partnership with Insight Investment announced plans to align Mellon Investments fixed income capabilities with Insight. In September 2021, Insight said c.£76bn of assets in fixed income capabilities across stable value, municipal, efficient beta and taxable fixed income strategies had been transferred to Insight.

In July 2021, Insight Investment was named the asset manager whose brand was most respected in the institutional marketplace. Edelman’s Asset Management Brand Index, which looks at the top 50 international managers in the world by AUM, ranked Insight first with a brand score of 83 (out of 100). In April 2024, Insight was again ranked first.

In January 2025, Insight CEO Abdallah Nauphal announced his decision to retire later in the year. His successor, Raman Srivastava, was appointed CEO on 30 April 2025.

== Investment capabilities ==
Insight Investment offers the following investment capabilities:

- Traditional fixed income (Corporate debt, Sovereign debt, Emerging market debt, Buy and maintain)
- Specialist fixed income (Asset-backed securities, Systematic fixed income, Multi-sector credit, US municipal bonds, Absolute return)
- Liability-driven investing (LDI)
- Fiduciary management
- Integrated solutions
- Currency
- Multi-asset
- Responsible investment

== Awards ==
Insight Investment has won over 40 industry awards since the beginning of 2020.

In 2026, Insight ranked first in Edelman’s Asset Management Brand Index, which evaluates global institutional asset managers. Insight was named Investment Manager of the Year, Fixed Income Manager of the Year, LDI Manager of the Year and CDI Manager of the Year at the 2026 Professional Pensions’ UK Pensions Awards. As well as winning Best ESG Investment Fund – Emerging Markets and Impact (Investment Manager) at the 2026 ESG Investing Awards.

In 2026, Insight was ranked in first place for Overall LDI Quality for the 15th consecutive year. It was also ranked in first place for Overall Quality in Fixed Income. Separately, Insight was named 2026 Coalition Greenwich Best Asset Manager in Institutional Investment Management in the UK.

== Sponsorships ==
Insight Investment has sponsored the Royal Academy Summer Exhibition since 2006.

== Key people ==
- Raman Srivastava – CEO
- Andrew Kitchen – Chief Finance Officer
- Lynne Dalgarno - Head of Human Resources
- Carl Woodhatch - Chief Legal Officer
- Adrian Grey - Global Chief Investment Officer
- Andrew Stephens - Head of Distribution, EMEA
- James Helby - Chief Risk Officer
- Serkan Bektas - Head of Client Solutions Group
- David Leduc - CEO Insight North America
