= Gerald Hassell =

Gerald L. Hassell
- Education: Duke University; New York University
- Occupations: former chairman and CEO of The Bank of New York Mellon

Gerald L. Hassell (born 1952) is an American bank executive and is the former chairman and CEO of The Bank of New York Mellon.

== Career ==
Gerald Hassell joined the Bank of New York in 1973 when he was only 21 years old as a management trainee, and has held various positions in the credit and corporate banking divisions. He was involved in the formation and operation of the bank's Communications, Entertainment & Publishing Division, and had responsibility for strategic planning and administrative services.

Prior to his appointment as president and director in 1998, during which he replaced Tom Renyi who went on to become CEO of the bank, Hassell was a senior executive vice president and chief commercial banking officer. He was also a member of the bank's Senior Policy Committee.

He retained the presidency on the merger with Mellon and in 2011 became chairman and chief executive officer, stepping down as president in 2012. Hassell remained CEO until Charles Scharf replaced him in July 2017 and will step down as chairman at the beginning of 2018.

He is a member of The Financial Services Roundtable and Financial Services Forum; a member of the board of Private Export Funding Corporation

== Personal ==
Hassell received a BA degree in Economics from Duke University in 1973 and an MBA in Finance from the New York University's Stern School of Business.

Hassell is married to Anita-Agnes. They have two children.

== Philanthropy ==
In 2012, Hassell and his wife, Anita-Agnes, donated $4 million to Duke University.

He is the former chairman of the Board of Visitors of The Fuqua School of Business at Duke University; and Vice Chairman of Big Brothers/Big Sisters of New York.

== See also ==
- Bank of New York
