= BNY =

American financial services company

The Bank of New York Mellon Corporation

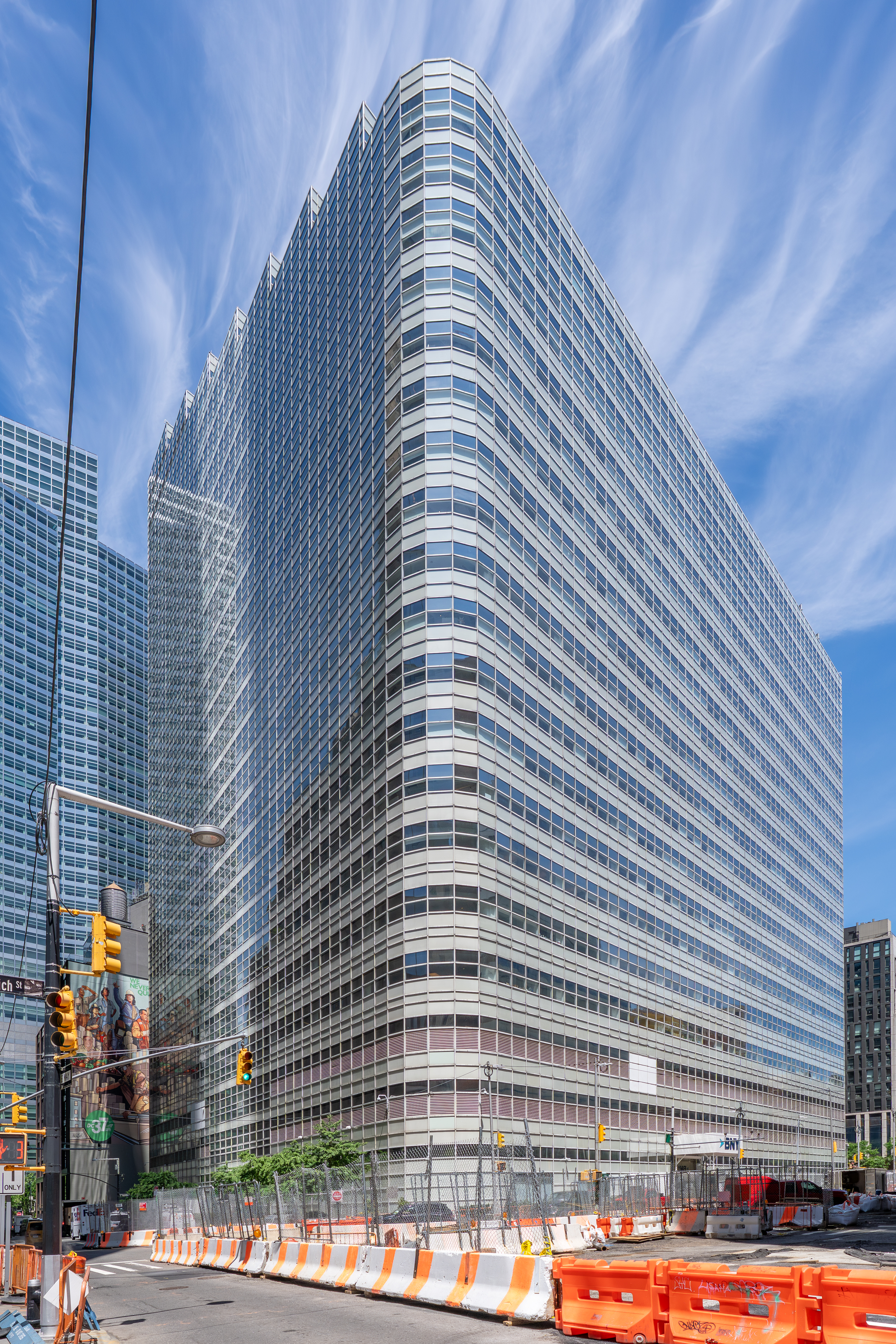
- Headquarters at 240 Greenwich Street in Manhattan, New York City
- Type: Public
- Traded as: NYSE: BNY; S&P 100 component; S&P 500 component
- Industry: Financial services
- Predecessors: Bank of New York (founded 1784); Mellon Financial (founded 1870)
- Founded: July 1, 2007; 19 years ago
- Headquarters: Manhattan, New York City, U.S.
- Area served: Worldwide
- Key people: Robin Vince (CEO); Dermot McDonogh (CFO)
- Products: Asset management; Banking; Equities trading; Investment management; Private equity; Wealth management
- Revenue: ▲US$18.6 billion (2024)
- Operating income: ▲US$5.85 billion (2024)
- Net income: ▲US$4.53 billion (2024)
- AUM: ▲US$2.03 trillion (2024)
- Total assets: ▲US$416 billion (2024)
- Total equity: ▲US$41.3 billion (2024)
- Number of employees: 61,800 (2024)
- Subsidiaries: BNY Investments; BNY Pershing; BNY Wealth
- Website: www.bny.com

The Bank of New York Mellon Corporation, commonly known as BNY or by its prior brand name BNY Mellon, is an American international financial services company headquartered in New York City.

BNY was established in its current form in July 2007 by the merger of the Bank of New York and Mellon Financial Corporation. The company provides a wide range of financial services, including asset management, custody and securities services, government finance services, and pension plan management. BNY serves diverse clients, including corporations, institutions, and individuals, offering financial expertise and technological platforms to support their objectives. The company's key subsidiaries include BNY Investments, BNY Pershing, and BNY Wealth. It is the world's largest custodian bank and securities services company.

Through the lineage of Bank of New York, which was founded in 1784 by a group that included Alexander Hamilton, BNY is regarded as one of the three oldest banks in the United States and among the oldest in the world. It was the first company listed on the New York Stock Exchange. In 2024, it was ranked 130th on the Fortune 500 list of the largest U.S. corporations by total revenue, and a 2018 Fortune analysis identified it as the oldest company on the list. As of 2026, it was the 10th-largest bank in the United States by total assets and the 83rd-largest in the world. BNY is considered a systemically important financial institution by the Financial Stability Board.

As of September 2024, BNY had $2.1 trillion in assets under management and $52.1 trillion in assets under custody and administration, making it the first bank to surpass $50 trillion. BNY has been named among Fortune's World's Most Admired Companies.

== History ==
=== Bank of New York ===
The Walton Mansion housed the Bank of New York from 1784 to 1787.

The first bank in the U.S. was the Bank of North America in Philadelphia, which was chartered by the Continental Congress in 1781; Alexander Hamilton, Thomas Jefferson, Benjamin Franklin, and Isaac Roosevelt were among its founding shareholders. In February 1784, The Massachusetts Bank in Boston was chartered.

The shipping industry in New York City chafed under the lack of a bank, and investors envied the 14% dividends that Bank of North America paid, and months of local discussion culminated in a June 1784 meeting at a coffee house on St. George's Square which led to the formation of the Bank of New York company. The bank operated without a charter for seven years. The initial plan was to capitalize the company with $750,000, a third in cash and the rest in mortgages, but after this was disputed the first offering was to capitalize it with $500,000 in gold or silver. When the bank opened on June 9, 1784, the full $500,000 had not been raised; 723 shares had been sold, held by 192 people. Aaron Burr had three of them, and Hamilton had one and a half shares. The first president was Alexander McDougall and the Cashier was William Seton.

Its first offices were in the old Walton Mansion in New York City. In 1787, it moved to a site on Hanover Square that the New York Cotton Exchange later moved into.

The bank provided the United States government its first loan in 1789. The loan was orchestrated by Hamilton, then Secretary of the Treasury, and it paid the salaries of United States Congress members and President George Washington.

The Bank of New York was the first company to be traded on the New York Stock Exchange when it first opened in 1792. In 1796, the bank moved to a location at the corner of Wall Street and William Street, which would later become 48 Wall Street.

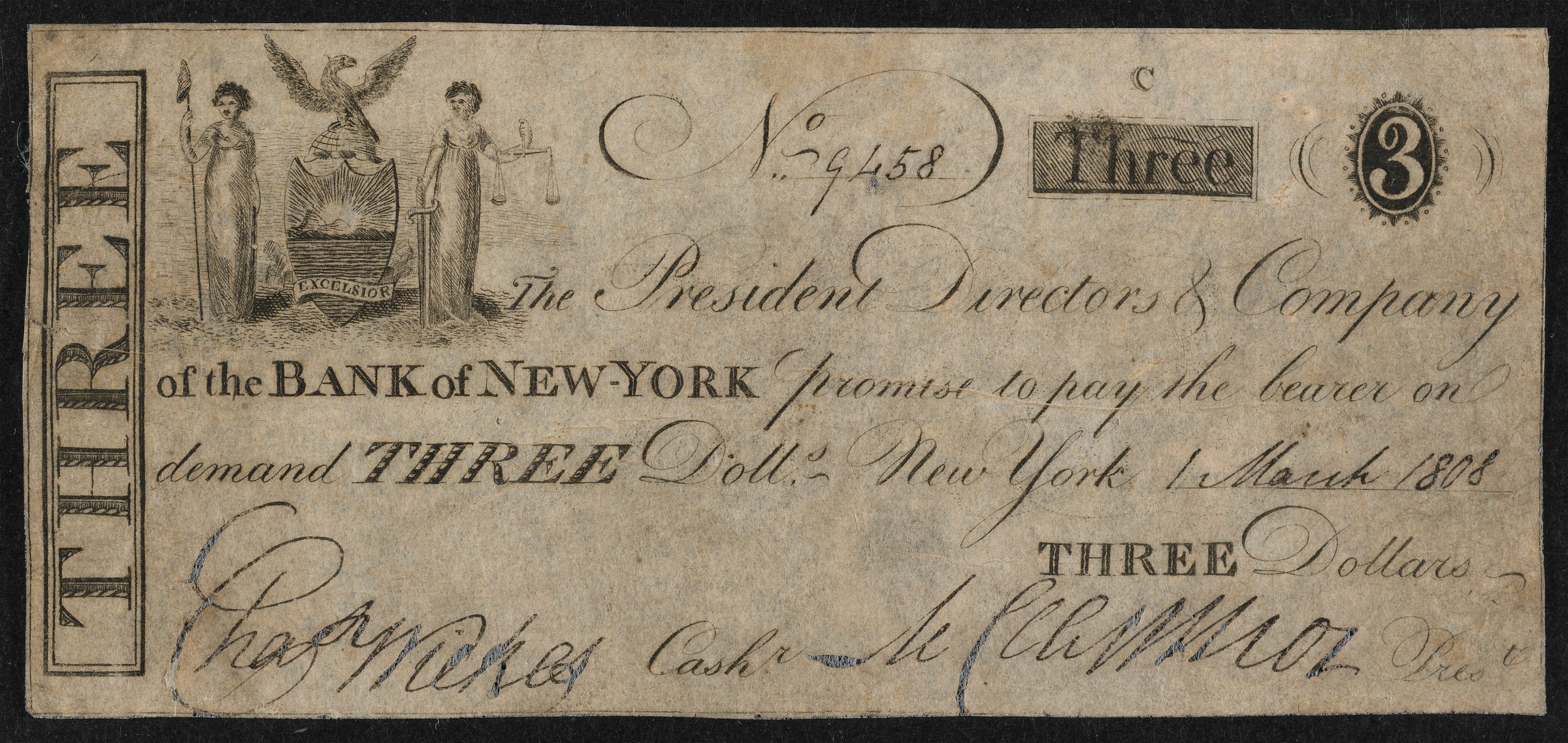
1808 Bank of New York 3 dollar banknote

The bank had a monopoly on banking services in the city until the Bank of the Manhattan Company was founded by Aaron Burr in 1799; the Bank of New York and Hamilton vigorously opposed its founding.

During the 19th century, the bank was known for its conservative lending practices that allowed it to weather financial crises. It was involved in the funding of the Morris and Erie canals, and steamboat companies. The bank helped finance both the War of 1812 and the Union Army during the American Civil War. Following the Civil War, the bank loaned money to many major infrastructure projects, including utilities, railroads, and the New York City Subway.

Through the early 20th century, the Bank of New York continued to expand and prosper. In July 1922, the bank merged with the New York Life Insurance and Trust Company. The bank continued to profit and pay dividends throughout the Great Depression, and its total deposits increased during the decade. In 1948, the bank again merged, this time with the Fifth Avenue Bank, which was followed by a merger in 1966 with the Empire Trust Company. The bank's holding company was created in 1969.

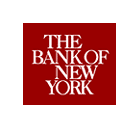
Older Bank of New York logo

In 1988, the Bank of New York merged with Irving Bank Corporation after a year-long takeover bid by Bank of New York. Irving had been headquartered at 1 Wall Street and after the merger, this became the headquarters of the Bank of New York on July 20, 1988. (Note: In 1922, Irving Trust opened an account with Vnesheconombank, known since 2018 as VEB.RF, and beginning on October 7, 1988, when the merger was approved, the Bank of New York was able to conduct transactions with the Soviet Union and later in 1991 Russia. Natasha Kagalovsky (née Gurfinkel) with the pseudonym Gurova, who had been an employee at Irving Trust since 1986 and was in charge of the banking with the Soviet Union, became a senior vice president at the Bank of New York heading the Eastern European operations from 1992 until October 13, 1999, when she resigned. (Note: Allegedly, Semion Mogilevich instructed Natasha Kagalovsky (née Gurfinkel) to wire transfer Cali cartel funds from Bank of New York accounts though Brazilian banks to offshore shell companies.))

From 1993 to 1998, the bank made 33 acquisitions, including acquiring JP Morgan's Global Custody Business in 1995. Ivy Asset Management was acquired in 2000.

In the 1990s, Vladimir Kirillovich Golitsyn or "Mickey" Galitzine (Note: Vladimir Kirillovich Golitsyn or "Mickey" Galitzine (Russian: Владимир Кириллович Голицын; 1942-2018, born Belgrade) with the pseudonym Vladimirov, whose father was a director of the Tolstoy Foundation. In 1960, he joined the Bank of New York and worked as an accountant in its International Department but later headed the Russia team as a vice president of the bank. His wife Tatiana Vladimirovna Kazimirova (Russian: Татьяна Владимировна Казимирова; b. 1943, Berlin), an employee at the Bank of New York whom he married in 1963, worked very closely with him. He traveled for his first time to Russia in 1990. He worked closely with banks in Greece, Malta, and Italy and was an expert in cotton, gold, silver, and other raw materials financing.) established and headed the Eastern European Department at the Bank of New York until 1992 and hired many Russians. He mentored many new bankers in Hungary, the former East Germany, Poland, Romania, and Bulgaria and travelled extensively to capital cities in the former Soviet Union or the CIS to assist new bankers especially in Russia to where he travelled for his first time in 1990, Ukraine, Latvia, Georgia, Armenia, Turkmenistan, and Kazakhstan. Bank of New York had correspondent accounts for several Russian banks including Inkombank (Russian: Инкомбанк), Menatep (Russian: «Менатеп»), Tokobank (Russian: Токобанк), Tveruniversalbank (Russian: Тверьуниверсалбанк), Alfa-Bank (Russian: Альфа-банк), Sobinbank (Russian: Собинбанк), Moscow International Bank (Russian: Московский международный банк) and others. (Note: On October 26, 1999, Bank of New York gained BankBoston Panama as its subcustodian bank in Panama. Beginning in 1996, the 1973 established BankBoston Panama provided custody services to non-resident investors in Panama. On December 17, 2004, Bank of America sold its BankBoston (BKB) operations in Peru, Colombia, and Panama to the 1955 established Panamanian private equity bank Banco General. (Note: Banco General maintains offices in Costa Rica, has representative offices in Mexico, Guatemala, El Salvador, Colombia and Peru and has correspondent banking with Dresdner Bank Lateinamerika AG in Panama and was closely associated with Vladimir Putin's close friend Matthias Warnig at its Saint Petersburg branch, Banco Latinoamericano de Exportaciones SA (BLADEX) in Panama, Bank of Nova Scotia in Panama, Chase Manhattan Bank, Bank of New York, Citibank, Colonial Bank in Miami, First Union Bank in Miami, SunTrust Bank in Miami, Bank of America in Miami, Barclays Bank PLC in Miami, Banco General (Overseas) in the Cayman Islands, HSBC Bank USA in New York, HSBC Bank PLC in Panama, and others.))

In October 2002, Bank of New York entered into an alliance with ING to gain a stronger footing in Eastern European markets.

In 2003, Bank of New York acquired Pershing LLC, the stock clearing unit of Credit Suisse First Boston for $2 billion. The Pershing acquisition made BNY the nation's largest clearing firm for stock trades. EMAT and the wealth management firm Lockwood Financial Partners, which was originally formed as Lockwood Advisors in 1995 and was based in Malvern, Pennsylvania, specialised in providing independent financial investment advisory services to brokers of high-net-worth individuals; it went on to become one of the largest independent advisory companies in the United States before both firms were sold to the Bank of New York in 2002, while Gerald L Hassell was president of Bank of New York. Lockwood and Pershing LLC were folded into the BNY Securities Group under the Pershing umbrella in October 2003, with Joseph M. Velli heading the BNY Securities Group. It allowed Bank of New York to compete against U.S. Trust, J.P. Morgan Chase, as well as those more brokerage-oriented organizations for private banking clients. (Note: In 1996, in conjunction with his brother-in-law Petros Goulandris, Tony O'Reilly along with CEO Leonard Reinhart backed a management team that created Lockwood Financial Partners, which was named after friend Jim Lockwood who was a colleague and fee-based pioneer, and its sister company E-MAT (EMAT) which was founded by Leonard Reinhart and Jay N. Whipple to provide the first common operating program for separately managed accounts (SMAs). Prior to the acquisition of Lockwood and EMAT by BoNY, RBC Dominion Securities was the two firms primary institutional advisory account. At the time, assets under management were estimated to be in excess of $11 billion.)

In 2005, the bank paid a $14 million settlement to the Russian government concerning the money laundering activities of a rogue employee in the 1990s. This scandal has sometimes been called Russiagate. (Note: In 2005, the bank settled a US federal investigation that began in 1996 concerning money laundering related to post-Soviet privatization in Russia. The illegal operation involved two Russian emigres, Peter Berlin and his wife Lyudmila "Lucy" (née Pritzker) Edwards who was a Vice President of the bank and worked at its London office, moving over US$7 billion via hundreds of wires. Through accounts created by Peter Berlin for Alexei Volkov's Torfinex Corporation, Bees Lowland, which was an offshore shell company created by Peter Berlin, and Benex International Company Inc, numerous irregular wire transfers occurred at the Bank of New York. In October 1997 at Bologna, Joseph Roisis, also spelled Yosif Aronovizh Roizis and nicknamed Cannibal as a member of Russian mafia's Solntsevskaya Bratva with businesses in Czechoslovakia, explained to Italian prosecutors that 90% of the money flowing through Benex accounts at the Bank of New York is Russian mafia money. (Note: Joseph Roizis also spelled Roitsis (Russian: Ройцис; b. late 1940s, Soviet Union), who was also known as Aron, Gregory, Grisha, or "Ogre", immigrated to the United States with his wife and two children two years after fighting for Israel in the Yom Kippur War and operated a furniture store in Brighton Beach as a front for trafficking heroin from Romania where he purchased furniture for his store. Marat Balagula (Russian: Марат Балагул) assisted him with obtaining heroin from Thailand via Poland. Roitsis gave Leonid "Tarzan" Fainberg or Feinberg (Russian: Леонид «Тарзан» Файнберг; b. Ukraine), who was also known as Ludwid "Tarzan" Fainberg and was trained as a dentist but left the Soviet Union for Israel where he obtained an Israeli passport and immigrated to the United States in the 1980s via Germany, a job at his furniture store in Brighton Beach, Brooklyn, New York City.) Alexei Volkov was charged in the United States but fled to Russia which has no extradition treaty with the United States and later the charges were dropped. Svetlana Kudryavtsev, a Bank of New York employee that was responsible for the proper operation of the Benex accounts in New York which had ties to Semion Mogilevich and through which passed $4.2 billion from October 1998 to March 1999, refused to cooperate and resigned during an internal audit of the matter but was later indicted by the FBI for her role in which she received $500 a month from Edwards for her services. (Note: Until his death in July 2020, William Sessions was the American attorney of Semion Mogilevich, who is the "boss of bosses" of the Russian mafia, has close ties with Vladimir Putin, and is a member of the FBI Most Wanted Fugitives list.) Alexander Mamut's Sobinbank, which since August 2010 is a subsidiary of Rossiya Bank, was raided on October 10, 1999, in support of United States investigations into money laundering at the Bank of New York. The Vanuatu registered Sobinbank Limited facilitated transfers between December 1997 and February 1999 for Benex accounts. Edmond Safra of the bank Republic New York, which is a longtime rival of the Bank of New York, alerted the FBI to the money laundering scheme which also involved Russian banks including Sobinbank and the Depozitarno-Kliringovy Bank (DKB) or the Russian Deposit Clearinghouse Bank (Russian: российский «Депозитарно-клиринговый банк» («ДКБ»)) which was created by Peter Berlin and had the same address as the Bees Lowland offshore shell company. $3 billion went from both Russian DKB and Sobinbank accounts through the Igor and Oleg Berezovsky owned Italian firm Prima based in Rimini and, through Andrei Marisov at the Grigory Luchansky associated French firm Kama Trade which had accounts with the Société bancaire arabe (SBA) to accounts at the Peter Berlin created Sinex Bank in Nauru. (Note: On January 10, 2006, the Lebanese bank Banque Libano-Française S.A.L., which has its headquarters in Beirut, gained a majority stake of 78.3% in the 1978 founded Société bancaire arabe (SBA) with the Claude Bébéar associated AXA subsidiary Compagnie Financière de Paris having a stake of 20%. Compagnie Financière de Paris held a 34% stake with thirty other shareholders before 2006. Later, Banque Libano-Française S.A.L. increased its stake to 99%. SBA has its headquarters in Paris at 28 rue de Berri (8ème), maintains a branch in Limassol, Cyprus, and has 100% ownership of the Geneva based Financière SBA (Suisse). SBA's focus is Syria with some operations in Lebanon. SBA's Geneva affiliate Societe Bancaire Arabe (Suisse) incurred heavy loses in the early 1990s and was converted to a finance company according to Mustafa Janoudi who was SBA's chairman general manager from the 1990s until 2006 when he became Vice Chairman and General Manager Délégué and Bernard Vernhes became chairman general manager. Bernard Vernhes was previously at the Banque Française de l'Orient (BFO) in Paris as chairman general manager and later at Banque Libano-Française SAL as general manager.) (Note: Saeb Shafiq Nahas also spelled Nahhas (b. 1936, al-Jura neighborhood, Damascus) held a 12% stake in Société bancaire arabe (SBA) until May 14, 1993 when he sold it to private investors. Nahas is very close to the Assad family especially Rifaat al-Assad who is a brother of Hafez al-Assad. Beginning in 1966, Nahas has assisted in arms sales to Iran and especially Hezbollah. His farm along the Damascus International Road is used by the Iranian Revolutionary Guard to train militias that Nahas also hosts at his al-Safir Hotel in Sayyidah Zainab neighborhood of Damascus. He is very wealthy. His close relationship with Bashar al-Assad led to numerous of Nahas's investments in Kazakhstan, Mexico, United Arab Emirates, Lebanon, Jordan, and Sudan. In 2015, the Central Bank of Syria froze his funds because of Nahas's failure to repay a loan which led to Nahas fleeing to Lebanon where he firmly supported the Syrian regime, so later his funds were unfrozen. His two sons Hadi and Muhammad remained in Syria to manage the Nahas family's assets in Syria.))

In 2006, the Bank of New York traded its retail banking and regional middle-market businesses for J.P. Morgan Chase's corporate trust assets. The deal signaled the bank's exit from retail banking.

=== Mellon Financial ===
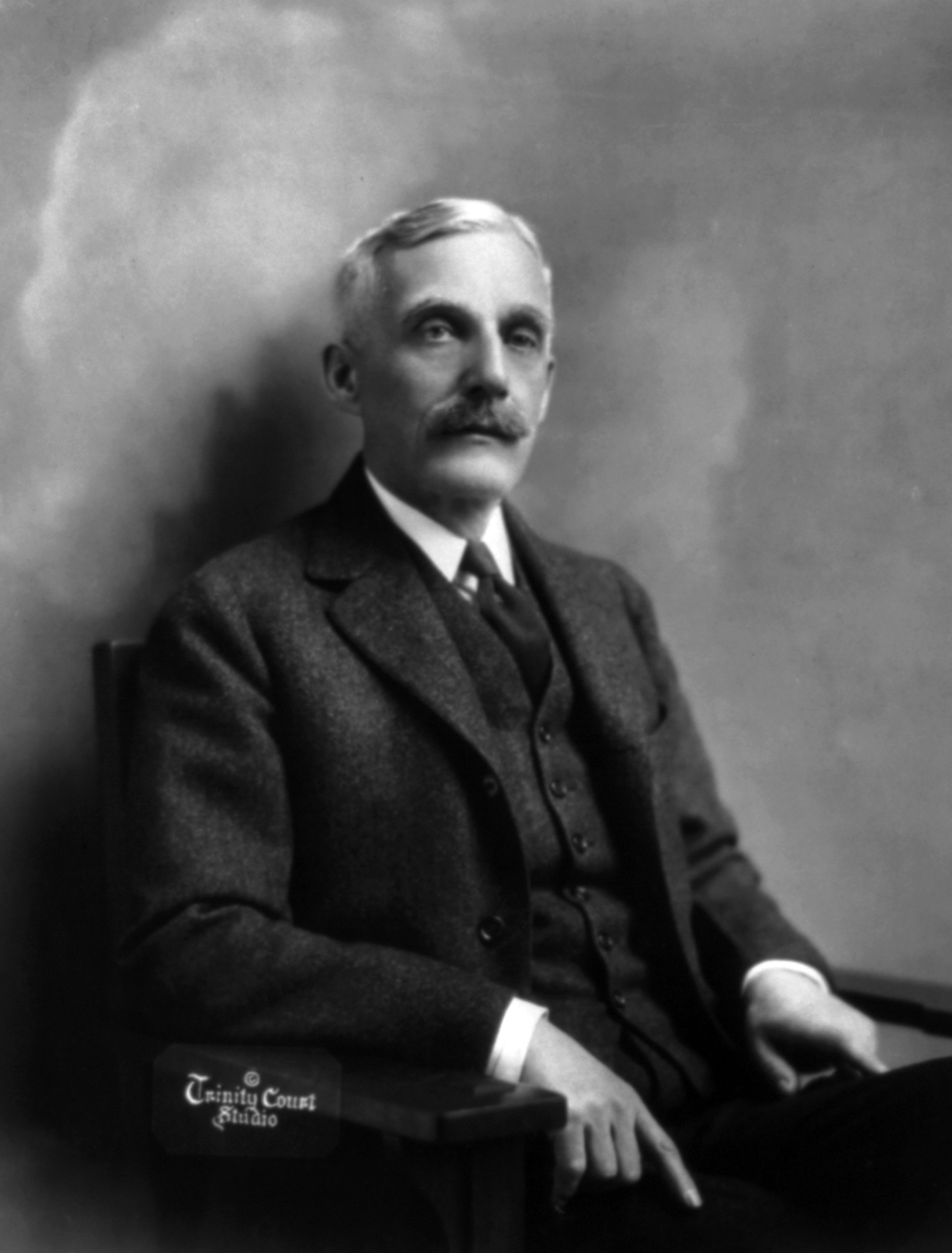
Andrew W. Mellon

Mellon Financial was founded as T. Mellon & Sons' Bank in Pittsburgh, Pennsylvania, in 1869 by retired judge Thomas Mellon and his sons Andrew W. Mellon and Richard B. Mellon. The bank invested in and helped found numerous industrial firms in the late 1800s and early 1900s including Alcoa, Westinghouse, Gulf Oil, General Motors and Bethlehem Steel. Both Gulf Oil and Alcoa are, according to the financial media, considered to be T. Mellon & Sons' most successful financial investments.

In 1902, T. Mellon & Sons' name was changed to the Mellon National Bank. In 1946, the firm merged with the Union Trust Company, a business founded by Andrew Mellon in 1899, and other affiliated financial firms. The newly formed organization was named the Mellon National Bank and Trust Company, and was Pittsburgh's first US$1 billion bank.

The bank formed the first dedicated family office in the United States in 1971. A reorganization in 1972 led to the bank's name changing to Mellon Bank, N.A. and the formation of a holding company, Mellon National Corporation.

Mellon Bank acquired multiple banks and financial institutions in Pennsylvania during the 1980s and 1990s. In 1992, Mellon acquired 54 branch offices of Philadelphia Savings Fund Society, the first savings bank in the United States, founded in 1819.

In 1993, Mellon acquired The Boston Company from American Express and AFCO Credit Corporation from The Continental Corporation. The following year, Mellon merged with the Dreyfus Corporation, bringing its mutual funds under its umbrella. In 1999, Mellon Bank Corporation became Mellon Financial Corporation. Two years later, it exited the retail banking business by selling its assets and retail bank branches to Citizens Financial Group.

=== Merger ===
On December 4, 2006, the Bank of New York and Mellon Financial Corporation announced they would merge. The merger created the world's largest securities servicing company and one of the largest asset management firms by combining Mellon's wealth-management business and the Bank of New York's asset-servicing and short-term-lending specialties. The companies anticipated saving about $700 million in costs and cutting around 3,900 jobs, mostly by attrition.

The deal was valued at $16.5 billion and under its terms, the Bank of New York's shareholders received 0.9434 shares in the new company for each share of the Bank of New York that they owned, while Mellon Financial shareholders received 1 share in the new company for each Mellon share they owned. The Bank of New York and Mellon Financial entered into mutual stock option agreements for 19.9 percent of the issuer's outstanding common stock. The merger was finalized on July 1, 2007. The company's principal office of business was located at the One Wall Street office previously held by the Bank of New York. The full name of the company became The Bank of New York Mellon Corp., with the BNY Mellon brand name being used for most lines of business.

=== Post-merger history ===
The post-merger logo for the firm

In October 2008, the U.S. Treasury named BNY Mellon the master custodian of the Troubled Asset Relief Program (TARP) bailout fund during the 2008 financial crisis. BNY Mellon won the assignment, which included handling accounting and record-keeping for the program, through a bidding process. In November 2008, the company announced that it would lay-off 1,800 employees, or 4% of its global workforce, due to the 2008 financial crisis. According to the results of a February 2009 stress test conducted by federal regulators, BNY Mellon was one of only three banks that could withstand a worsening economic situation. The company received $3 billion from TARP, which it paid back in full in June 2009, along with US$136 million to buy back warrants from the Treasury in August 2009.

In August 2009, BNY Mellon purchased Insight Investment, a management business, from Lloyds Banking Group. The company acquired PNC Financial Services' Global Investment Servicing Inc. in July 2010 and Talon Asset Management's wealth management business in 2011.

By 2013, the company's capital had steadily recovered from the 2008 financial crisis. In the results of the Federal Reserve's Dodd-Frank stress test in 2013, the bank was least affected by hypothetical extreme economic scenarios among banks tested. It was also a top performer on the same test in 2014.

BNY Mellon began a marketing campaign in 2013 to increase awareness of the company that included a new slogan and logo.

In 2013, the bank started building a new IT system called NEXEN. NEXEN uses open source technology and includes components such as an API store, data analytics, and a cloud computing environment.

In May 2014, BNY Mellon moved its global headquarters from 1 Wall Street to Brookfield Place, following the sale of the former building. In June 2014, the company combined its global markets, global collateral services and prime services to create the new Markets Group, also known as BNY Markets Mellon. The company expanded its Hong Kong office in October 2014 as part of the company's plans to grow its wealth management business.

Between 2014 and 2016, BNY Mellon opened innovation centers focused on emerging technologies, big data, digital and cloud-based projects, with the first opening in Silicon Valley.

In September 2017, BNY Mellon announced that it agreed to sell CenterSquare Investment Management to its management team and the private equity firm Lovell Minnick Partners. The transaction is subject to standard regulatory approvals and is expected to be completed by the end of 2017.

In November 2017, BNY Mellon performed the United States banking industry's first real-time payment transaction using a system set up by The Clearing House. The transaction moved a nominal amount between accounts at BNY Mellon and U.S. Bancorp in three seconds, inaugurating the first new payment clearance and settlement system for the US in over 40 years.

In January 2018, BNY Mellon announced that it was again moving its headquarters location, less than four years after its prior move. The headquarters location was announced as 240 Greenwich Street, a renaming of the already BNY Mellon-owned 101 Barclay Street office building in Tribeca, New York City. BNY Mellon had owned the office building for over 30 years, with control of the location obtained via 99-year ground lease. The same year, the company purchased the location from the city for $352 million.

In February 2020, Mellon announced that it has successfully onboarded Liontrust Asset Management to its new Investment Operations platform.

In early 2023, BNY Mellon's Pershing unit announced the addition of real-time payments to its investor portal. In June 2023, BNY Mellon's Pershing X launched wealth management platform Wove. In July 2023, BNY Mellon became an early adopter of Federal Reserve's instant payment rail, FedNow. That same year, BNY made history by selecting minority-, veteran-, and woman-owned firms as bookrunners for a $500 million debt offering. Additionally, the company increased its minimum wage for U.S.-based employees by 12.5%, raising the hourly rate from $20.00 to $22.50, and expanded its mental health resources.

In June 2024, BNY Mellon announced an update to its logo and a simplification of its corporate brand to BNY. As part of this rebranding, BNY Mellon Investment Management was renamed BNY Investments, BNY Mellon Wealth Management became BNY Wealth, and BNY Mellon Pershing was shortened to BNY Pershing.

In mid-2025, it was reported that BNY approached Northern Trust about the possibility of a merger. The firms had conversations but BNY's CEO declined to comment publicly, stating focus remains on "organic growth".

In April 2026, the US Treasury announced that BNY would be designated as a financial agent to manage initial Trump accounts, while also partnering with Robinhood to develop an app and provide customer service.

In May 2026, the company changed its stock ticker symbol from BK to BNY on the New York Stock Exchange (NYSE).

== Operations ==
BNY offers technology, services and expertise across its platforms to support clients on a global scale, helping them create, administer, manage, transact, distribute and optimize their assets. BNY's businesses include BNY Investments, BNY Wealth and BNY Pershing.

BNY operates in 35 countries in the Americas, Europe, the Middle East and Africa (EMEA), and Asia-Pacific. The company employed 53,400 people As of December 2023. In October 2015, the group's American and global headquarters relocated to 225 Liberty Street, as the former 1 Wall Street building was sold in 2014. In July 2018, the company changed its headquarters again, this time to its existing 240 Greenwich Street location in New York (previously addressed 101 Barclay St). The group's EMEA headquarters are located in London and its Asia-Pacific headquarters are located in Hong Kong.

=== Business ===
BNY is an international financial services company that helps clients manage, move and safekeep their assets across the entire financial lifecycle. Today BNY helps over 90% of Fortune 100 companies and nearly all the top 100 banks globally access the money they need. BNY also supports governments in funding local projects and works with over 90% of the top 100 pension plans to safeguard assets for individuals.

BNY had $45.7 trillion in assets under custody and $1.8 trillion in assets under management as of September 2023. Those figures rose to $49.5 trillion in assets under custody and/or $2.0 trillion in assets under management by June 2024. The financial services offered by the business include asset servicing, alternative investment services, broker-dealer services, corporate trust services and treasury services. Other offerings include global collateral services, foreign exchange, securities lending, middle and back office outsourcing, and depository receipts. The bank's clients include a significant portion of Fortune 500 companies, top endowments, pension and employee benefit funds, life and health insurance companies, and leading universities.

In 2014, the company established the Markets Group, providing services in collateral management, securities finance, foreign exchange and capital markets. This group is now known as BNY Markets.

==== BNY Investments ====
BNY Investments is an asset management group that manages nearly $2 trillion in assets. It provides investment solutions through its specialist firms, which include ARX Investimentos, Dreyfus, Insight Investment, Mellon Investments Corporation, Newton Investment Management, Siguler Guff & Company, and Walter Scott & Partners. Each firm operates with its distinct approach to investment management across various asset classes.

==== BNY Pershing ====
BNY Pershing provides clearing and custody, trading and settlement services, a variety of investment solutions, middle and back office support, data insights and business consulting to clients in the wealth and institutional segments.

==== BNY Wealth ====
BNY's Wealth business handles the private banking, estate planning, family office services, and investment servicing and management of high-net-worth individuals and families. Starting in 2013, the unit began expansion efforts, including opening eight new banking offices, increasing salespeople, bankers, and portfolio managers on staff, and launching an awareness campaign for wealth management services through television ads. As of 2014, it ranks 7th among wealth management businesses in the United States.

=== Leadership ===
Charles W. Scharf was appointed CEO in July 2017 and became Chairman after former CEO and chairman Gerald Hassell retired at the end of 2017. Hassell had been Chairman and CEO since 2011, after serving as BNY Mellon's president from 2007 to 2012 and as the president of the Bank of New York from 1998 until its merger. Scharf stepped down in 2019 to become the new CEO of Wells Fargo. Thomas "Todd" Gibbons served as BNY Mellon's CEO from 2020 to 2022. Robin A. Vince was appointed president and CEO in August 2022, succeeding Gibbons. Upon his appointment, Robin Vince also became a member of the company's board of directors.

Karen Peetz served as president (the bank's first female president) from 2013 to 2016, when she retired; the company did not appoint a new president when she retired. Thomas Gibbons served as CFO between 2008 and 2017, when he also served as vice chairman. In 2017, Gibbons was replaced as CFO by Michael P. Santomassimo. BNY Mellon's Investment Management business is run by CEO Mitchell Harris, and the company's Investment Services business was led by Brian Shea until his retirement in December 2017. In 2020, Hanneke Smits became CEO of BNY Mellon Investment Management. In July 2024, BNY announced that Hanneke Smits would retire at the end of 2024, with Jose Minaya to become the next head of BNY Investments and BNY Wealth.

As of 2024, the company's board members were Linda Z. Cook, Joseph J. Echevarria, M. Amy Gilliland, Jeffrey A. Goldstein, K. Guru Gowrappan, Ralph Izzo, Sandie O'Connor, Elizabeth E. Robinson, Robin Vince, and Alfred W. "Al" Zollar.

=== Company culture ===
In 2008, BNY Mellon formed a Board of Directors corporate social responsibility committee to set sustainability goals. The company's corporate social responsibility activities include philanthropy, social finance in the communities the bank is located in, and protecting financial markets globally.

The bank's philanthropic activities include financial donations and volunteerism. The company matches employee volunteer hours and donations with financial contributions through its Giving at BNY program. Between 2010 and 2012, the company and its employees donated approximately $100 million to charity. In 2014, the company worked with the Forbes Fund to create a platform that connects nonprofit organizations with private businesses to solve social challenges.

The CDP, which measures corporate greenhouse gas emissions and disclosures, gave the company A ratings between 2013 and 2021. As of 2014, the company has saved $48 million due to building efficiency; five of its buildings have achieved Leadership in Energy and Environmental Design (LEED-EB) certification and 23 have interiors that are LEED certified.

The company has business resource groups for employees that are focused on diversity and inclusion. In 2009, Karen Peetz co-founded the BNY Mellon Women's Initiative Network (WIN), a resource group for female employees' professional development. As of 2013, WIN had 50 chapters. Other groups include PRISM for LGBT employees, IMPACT, which serves multicultural employees, HEART for employees with disabilities, GENEDGE, intergenerational resource group, and VETNET for veterans, military spouses, family members and their colleagues. The bank has services for returning military, including a tool to help veterans align military skills and training with jobs at the company. In 2014, it was recognized for its diversity practices by the National Business Inclusion Consortium, which named it Financial Services Diversity Corporation of the Year.

In 2009, the company began an innovation program for employees to suggest ideas for large-scale projects and company improvement. Ideas from the initial pilot program generated approximately $165 million in pretax profit. The program results in an annual contest called "ACE" in which teams pitch their ideas.

In 2022, BNY Mellon released The Pathway to Inclusive Investment, a report focused on the gender-investment gap. The research surveyed 8,000 respondents across 16 markets globally with combined assets of $60T. The report identified barriers to investment and ways that the industry could overcome them, indicating that if were women to invest at the same rate as men, this would unlock an estimated $3.2T of additional capital.

In 2023, BNY hired Meaghan Muldoon, the firm's first Chief Sustainability Officer.

As of 2024, BNY has been included in the Dow Jones Sustainability Indices, recognized by the Human Rights Campaign Foundation's Corporate Equality Index, and listed on the FTSE4Good Global Benchmark Index, Bloomberg's Gender-Equality Index, and the JUST Capital's JUST 100 list.

== Controversies and legal issues ==
=== Foreign currency exchange issues ===
In October 2011, the U.S. Justice Department and New York's attorney general filed civil lawsuits against the Bank of New York, alleging foreign currency fraud. The suits held that the bank deceived pension-fund clients by manipulating the prices assigned to them for foreign currency transactions. Allegedly, the bank selected the day's lowest rates for currency sales and highest rates for purchases, appropriating the difference as corporate profit. The scheme was said to have generated $2 billion for the bank, at the expense of millions of Americans' retirement funds, and to have transpired over more than a decade. Purportedly, the bank would offer secret pricing deals to clients who raised concerns, in order to avoid discovery. Bank of New York defended itself vigorously, maintaining the fraud accusations were "flat out wrong" and warning that as the bank employed 8,700 employees in New York, any damage to the bank would have negative repercussions for the state of New York.

Finally, in March 2015, the company admitted to facts concerning the misrepresentation of foreign exchange pricing and execution. BNY Mellon's alleged misconduct in this area includes representing pricing as best rates to its clients, when in fact they were providing clients with bad prices while retaining larger margins. In addition to dismissing key executives, the company agreed to pay a total of US$714 million to settle related lawsuits.

In May 2015, BNY Mellon agreed to pay $180 million to settle a foreign exchange-related lawsuit.

In May 2016, multiple plaintiffs filed suit against the bank, alleging that the company had breached its fiduciary duty to ERISA plans that held American Depositary Receipts by overcharging retirement plans that invested in foreign securities. In March 2017, the presiding judge declined to dismiss the suit. In December 2017, another lawsuit alleged that BNY Mellon manipulated foreign exchange rates was filed by Sheet Metal Workers' National Pension Fund. BNY Mellon agreed to pay $12.5 million to settle the 2016 lawsuit in December 2018.

=== Personal data breach ===
In February 2008, BNY Mellon suffered a security breach resulting in the loss of personal information when backup tapes containing the personal records of 4.5 million individuals went missing. Social security numbers and bank account information were included in the records. The breach was not reported to the authorities until May 2008, and letters were sent to those affects on May 22, 2008.

In August 2008, the number of affected individuals was raised to 12.5 million, 8 million more than originally thought.

=== IT system outages ===
On Saturday, August 22, 2015, BNY Mellon's SunGard accounting system broke down during a software change. This led to the bank being unable to calculate net asset value (NAV) for 1,200 mutual funds via automated computer system. Between the breakdown and the eventual fix, the bank calculated the values using alternative means, such as manual operation staff. By Wednesday, August 26, the system was still not fully operational. The system was finally operational to regular capacity the following week. As a result of a Massachusetts Securities Division investigation into the company's failure and lack of a backup plan, the company paid $3 million.

In December 2016, another major technology issue caused BNY Mellon to be unable to process payments related to the SWIFT network. As of the time of the issue, the bank processed about 160,000 global payments daily, an average of $1.6 trillion. The company was unable to process payments for a 19 hours, which led to a backlog of payments and an extension of Fedwire payment services.

=== Privately owned public space agreement violation ===
According to a New York City Comptroller audit in April 2017, BNY Mellon was in violation of a privately owned public space (POPS) agreement for at least 15 years. In constructing the 101 Barclay Street building in Lower Manhattan, BNY Mellon had received a permit allowing modification of height and setback regulations in exchange for providing a lobby accessible to the general public 24 hours a day. Auditors and members of the public had been unable to access or assess the lobby for many years, and were actively prevented from doing so by BNY Mellon security.

In September 2018, the company began permitting public access to a portion of the lobby. However, BNY Mellon remains in violation of its agreement, as the lobby must be accessible to the public 24 hours a day. An audit by the New York City Comptroller in 2021 reported that company security personnel prevented auditors from entering or photographing the lobby and was seeking to have the "public lobby" designation removed. As of 2026, the lobby is still listed on the New York City government's website as a public space.

=== Employment legal issues ===
BNY Mellon settled foreign bribery charges with the U.S. Securities and Exchange Commission (SEC) in August 2015 regarding its practice of providing internships to relatives of officials at a Middle Eastern investment fund. The U.S. SEC found the firm in violation of the Foreign Corrupt Practices Act. The case was settled for $14.8 million.

In March 2019, BNY Mellon staff considered legal options after the company banned employees from working from home. In particular, staff cited concerns regarding the impact on childcare, mental health, and diversity. The company reverted the ban as a result of employee outcry.

=== Supreme Court of Canada finds NYB Mellon committed spoliation of evidence ===
On July 31, 2026, the Supreme Court of Canada ruled on a civil contractual dispute between NYB Mellon Corp and SS&C Technologies Canada Corp. The court unanimously held that NYB had committed spoliation of evidence. At trial, the Ontario Superior Court had awarded damages to SS&C amounting to US$5,696,850; SS&C had sought a total award of US$889,752,087. The Supreme Court allowed SS&C's appeal, confirmed that there had been spoliation, and held that the trial judge had not properly calculated the damages award, in light of the spoliation by NYB. The court remitted the case to the Superior Court, for a re-assessment of damages.

=== Other legal issues ===
In September 2009, BNY Mellon settled a lawsuit that had been filed against the Bank of New York by the Russian government in May 2007 for money laundering; the original suit claimed $22.5 billion in damages and was settled for $14 million.

In 2011, South Carolina sued BNY Mellon for allegedly failing to adhere to the investment guidelines relating to the state's pension fund. The company settled with the state in June 2013 for $34 million.

In July 2012, BNY Mellon settled a class action lawsuit relating to the collapse of Sigma Finance Corp. The suit alleged that the bank invested and lost cash collateral in medium-term notes. The company settled the lawsuit for $280 million.

In December 2018, BNY Mellon agreed to pay nearly $54 million to settle charges of improper handling of "pre-released" American depositary receipts (ADRs) under investigation of the U.S. Securities and Exchange Commission (SEC). BNY Mellon did not admit or deny the investigation findings but agreed to pay disgorgement of more than $29.3 million, $4.2 million in prejudgment interest and a penalty of $20.5 million.

== Recognition and rankings ==
As of 2024, BNY is the world's largest custody bank, the sixth-largest investment management firm in the world, and the seventh-largest wealth management firm in the United States. In 2018, BNY ranked 175 on the Fortune 500 and 250 on the Financial Times Global 500. By 2024, it ranked 130th on the Fortune 500 list.

It was named one of world's 50 Safest Banks by Global Finance in 2013 and 2014, and one of the 20 Most Valuable Banking Brands in 2014 by The Banker. BNY was named on the Dow Jones Sustainability North America Index in 2013, 2014 and 2015, and the World Index in 2014, 2015 and 2016. BNY has also been named among the World's Most Admired Companies by Fortune.

The bank claims to be the longest-running bank in the United States, though this distinction is sometimes disputed by rivals and historians. The Bank of North America, chartered in 1781, was eventually acquired by Wells Fargo after a series of mergers. Similarly, The Massachusetts Bank became part of Bank of America through a series of acquisitions. The Bank of New York remained independent, acquiring other companies, until its merger with Mellon. BNY is generally recognized as one of the three oldest banks in the U.S.

== Sponsorships ==
Since 2012, BNY has expanded its number of sponsorships. BNY was the title sponsor of the Oxford and Cambridge Boat Race from 2012 to 2015. The company also sponsors the Head of the Charles Regatta in Boston. In 2013, the company became a 10-year sponsor of the San Francisco 49ers and a founding partner of Levi's Stadium. The company is a regular sponsor of the Royal Academy of Arts in London, the Pittsburgh Symphony Orchestra, and is a founding sponsor of the Perelman Performing Arts Center (PAC) in Lower Manhattan. In January 2026, BNY was signed as the official institutional banking partner of Williams F1 Team.

== See also ==
- List of presidents of the Bank of New York
- 1 Wall Street
- BNY Mellon Center (disambiguation)
- CIBC Mellon
- Eagle Investment Systems

== Books ==
- Unger, Craig (August 14, 2018). House of Trump, House of Putin: The Untold Story of Donald Trump and the Russian Mafia. Dutton. ISBN 978-1524743505.
- Skuratov, Yury Ilyich (2013). Кремлёвские подряды: Последнее дело прокурора [Kremlin contracts. The last case of the Attorney General] (in Russian). Moscow: ООО «Издательство Алгоритм» (Algorithm Publishing House). ISBN 978-5-4438-0301-2.
