= Newton Investment Management =

London-based investment management company

BNY Investments Newton
- Company type: Subsidiary
- Industry: Investment management
- Founded: 1978; 48 years ago
- Headquarters: London, United Kingdom
- AUM: US$ 112.7 billion (December 2025)
- Parent: BNY Investments
- Website: newtonim.com

BNY Investments Newton is an investment management firm based in London. It is subsidiary of BNY Investments.

== History ==
The firm was founded as Newton in 1978 as a joint venture with Scottish insurance broker Reed Stonehouse. In 1986, it was acquired by alexander & alexander and was renamed to Newton Investment Management. In 1992, the firm did a management buyout of alexander & alexander's stake. In 1994, it acquired Capital House group of companies from the Royal Bank of Scotland, with the bank acquiring a 33% interest in Newton Investment Management.

In 1998, Mellon Bank (now BNY) acquired 75% of Newton Investment Management for $277 million and in 2002, acquired the remaining interest.

In 2025 Newton Investment Management was renamed to BNY Investments Newton.
