= Eagle Investment Systems =

American global provider of financial services

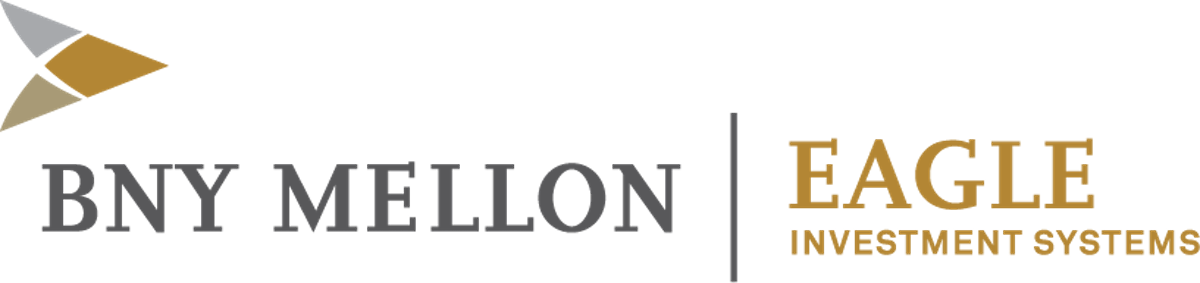
- Company type: Subsidiary of BNY Mellon (NYSE: BK)
- Industry: Financial Services Technology
- Founded: 1989
- Headquarters: Wellesley, MA, United States
- Key people: Mal Cullen, President and CEO
- Products: Portfolio Management, Data Management, Investment Accounting, Performance Measurement
- Number of employees: 1000+ (2018)

Eagle Investment Systems is an American global provider of financial services technology and a subsidiary of BNY Mellon. Founded in 1989 and based in Wellesley, Massachusetts, Eagle has 15 offices internationally, including offices in Beijing, Chennai, Dubai, London, Montreal, New York City, Pune, San Francisco, Singapore, Sydney and Toronto.

== Products and services ==
Eagle provides portfolio management, data management, investment accounting and performance measurement software to financial institutions. The company uses a secure private cloud called Eagle Access to host and provide ongoing support of the applications and systems infrastructure, thereby helping to reduce complexity and risk.

== Eagle clients ==
Eagle Investment Systems' clients are global financial services companies, including investment management organizations, wealth management organizations, mutual fund companies, hedge funds, brokerage firms, banks, trusts, public sector organizations, plan sponsors, endowments and insurance companies.

== Strategic alliances ==
Eagle has established strategic relationships with a number of organizations that provide complementary products and services for their clients. In February 2011, Eagle integrated with FINCAD, a provider of derivative pricing and analytics, to incorporate FINCAD Analytics into Eagle's data management and performance measurement solutions. In July 2012, Eagle announced a strategic relationship with MicroStrategy Incorporated, a business intelligence (BI) software vendor.

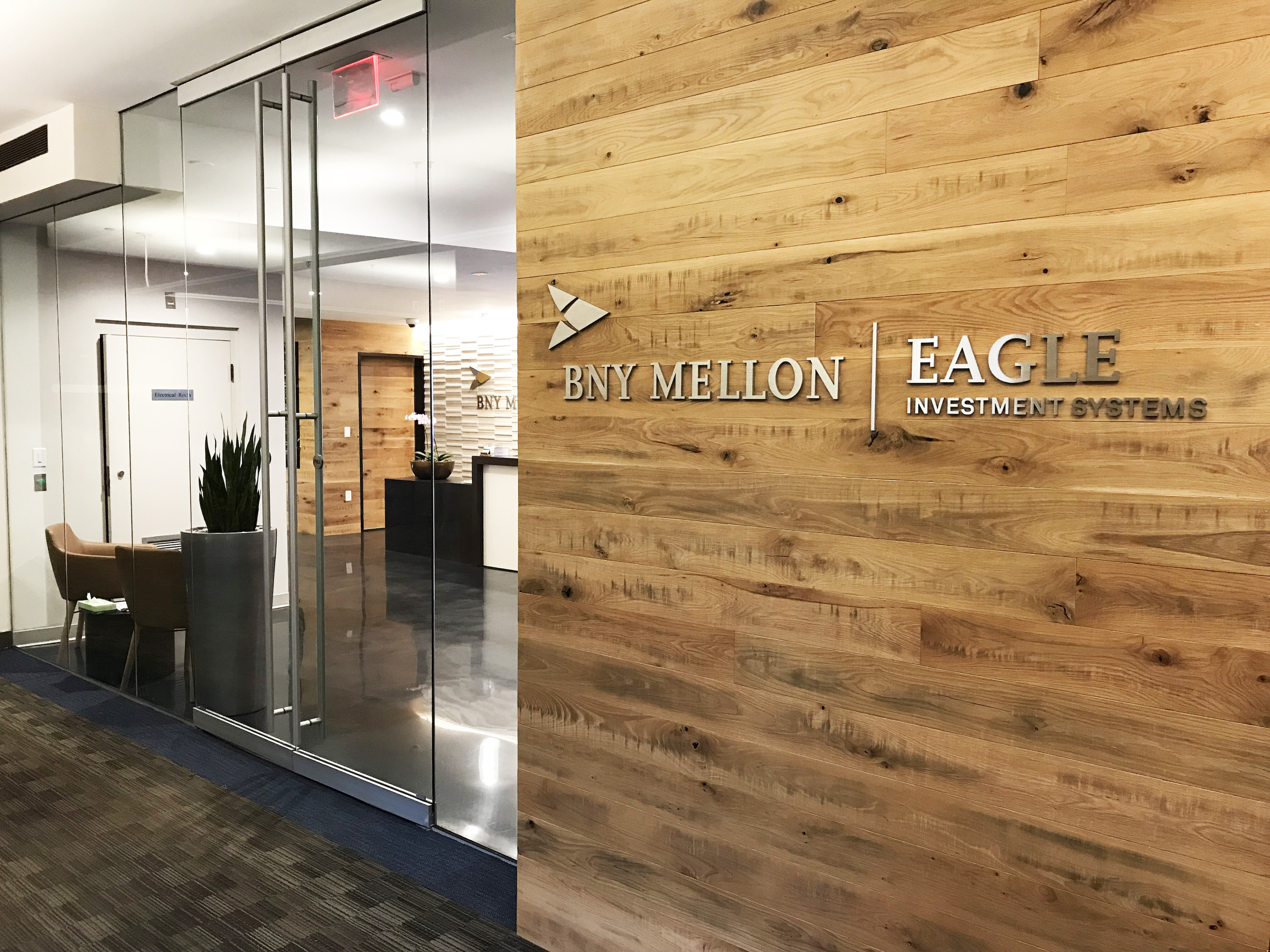
Eagle Investment Systems' Wellesley office, renovated in 2018.

== Company history ==
Eagle was founded in 1989 as a consulting firm focused on financial technology. In 1996, Eagle launched Eagle PACE, the precursor to its current Data Management Solution, which was followed in 1999 by the launch of Eagle STAR (Eagle Straight-Through Accounting and Recordkeeping), its Accounting Solution. In 2000, Eagle was rebranded to its current name, Eagle Investment Systems.

In 2000, Eagle opened a New York City office and in 2001 Eagle Investment Systems was acquired by Mellon Financial. In that same year, Eagle acquired ITS Associates and over the next two years opened both a London and Toronto office. In 2002, Eagle's ASP offering was rebranded as Eagle ACCESS, in 2003 the company launched its Performance Measurement Solution and in 2005 the Mutual Fund Accounting Solutions launched. The San Francisco office opened in 2006 and, in 2007, The Bank of New York (BNY) and Mellon Financial merged. In 2009 a Singapore office was established.

In late 2011, Eagle relocated its headquarters from Newton, MA to Wellesley, MA.
