= Walter Scott (investment manager) =

Scottish investment manager

Walter Grant Scott, FRSE is a Scottish investment manager, nuclear physicist, rowing enthusiast, and founder of the global equity management business Walter Scott and Partners.

== Early life ==
Walter Scott was born in Glasgow, in May 1947. He attended Eastwood High School and then went to Edinburgh University, where he gained a first-class honours degree in natural philosophy (physics) in 1969. He went on to obtain a Ph.D. at Trinity Hall, Cambridge in 1972, researching theoretical particle physics at the Cavendish Laboratory. During this time he developed a life-long interest in the college's boat club, and in rowing as a whole.

== Investment management ==
=== Ivory and Syme ===
As a nuclear physicist, Scott decided that although he was a capable researcher, he was in competition with potential Nobel Prize winners, and he was in a profession that was not very well paid. He decided to change careers to be in the financial services industry. In 1972 Scott started to work for Ivory and Sime in Edinburgh, and he eventually led their pension fund business. From there, after becoming a target for attempted head-hunting, he decided he could do better running his own business.

=== Walter Scott and Partners ===
In 1983, he left Ivory and Syme to found Walter Scott and Partners with two associates. (Note: A firm called Ivorgail Ltd took over the partnership of Walter Scott and Partners and changed its name to match.) It was a global equity management firm which became a private limited company. (Note: Walter Scott and Partners became a private limited company.) Rather than trying to produce growth forecasts, the focus was on understanding why some companies grow. The portfolio never contained more than fifty companies, held taking a long-term view. This approach was particularly appealing to a number of American clients and he found it helpful to emphasize the firm's Scottishness – wearing a kilt could be impressive. With about sixty staff, the partnership was decidedly up-market.

For the 2003–2004 tax year the business made pre-tax profits of £8 million on a turnover of £18 million, and Scott personally was estimated to be worth £62 million with an income of £100,000 a week. In 2006, the firm held 3.3 per cent (89 million shares) in Morrisons.

In May 2006, Scott sold the business to Mellon (later to become BNY) for between £250-£500 million, and resigned as director next year. Scott had been one of three shareholders and had owned 70 percent of the shares. At the time the business was managing £14.3 billion of assets.

=== Scott Investment Partners ===
With two other partners in 2013, after a period of "retiral", Scott established Scott Investment Partners LLP, also a global equity management firm, based in Henley-on-Thames.

== Personal life ==
Walter is married to Rosemary Scott, with three children. As well as rowing, he states his interests to be aviation (he has a pilot's licence), classic cars, gardening, and "rock 'n' roll". He is a member of the Leander Club, New York Athletic Club, and Monaco Yacht Club. He is an honorary fellow of Trinity Hall and a Fellow of the Royal Society of Edinburgh.

Scott is often described in the press as secretive or reclusive, and he avoids being photographed, but he is well known in the financial world and is "rather flamboyant" and ostentatious in his lifestyle.

In 2011 he publicly debated anthropogenic climate change with Brian Hoskins, – while agreeing that the climate is changing he expressed doubts about the rate and period of time for the change, and whether human activity has been involved.

In 2010 he donated £1 million to the National Museums Scotland as a contribution to its refurbishment plans. There is a gallery named after him. At the time his own wealth was estimated to be about £150 million.

As well as living on the Côte d'Azur, Scott has a home at Henley-on-Thames where he is a supporter of the Henley Royal Regatta. He has rowed for Upper Thames Rowing Club veterans. He purchased from Cambridge University Boat Club Amaryllis, the 50-foot umpire's launch built by Hobbs and Sons in 1928, and had it restored to again be in use at Henley for umpires and supporters. Amaryllis was later used as the model for four new launches.

== Charlotte Square ==
Scott is credited with restoring several properties in Charlotte Square in Edinburgh. In 1996 Scott's firm purchased 9, Charlotte Square in Edinburgh, one of the grandest squares in the city's New Town and the location of the official residence of Scotland's First Minister. (Note: On the north side of Charlotte Square the First Minister's official residence is Bute House, number 6, and The Georgian House, number 7, is a National Trust for Scotland property. In 2002 Scott owned the following: at the eastern end of the north side numbers 1, 2, 3, 4, western end of north side: 9, west side: 15, 16, 17, east side: 44 and 45.) By 2002 his had purchased nine more properties in the square, using 1, Charlotte Square for the firm's headquarters. (Note: As of 2016 Walter Scott and Partners Ltd still operates from this address under the same name.) It had cost £35 million to purchase and renovate the ten town houses. He did not view the purchases as being a commercial venture: "I believe Charlotte Square is the finest Georgian square in Europe, it was the best financial-legal address in Europe ... that is why I will be delighted to take my firm into it and return to the city's centre of gravity. I'd love to think we could re-establish the Square as the financial hub."
