= BNY Mellon Center =

BNY Mellon Center may refer to:

- BNY Mellon Center at One Boston Place, Boston, Massachusetts
- BNY Mellon Center (Philadelphia), Pennsylvania
- BNY Mellon Center (Pittsburgh), Pennsylvania
- Mellon National Bank Building, Pittsburgh, Pennsylvania

== See also ==
- Civic Arena (Pittsburgh), formerly the Mellon Arena
